= Cinema of Saudi Arabia =

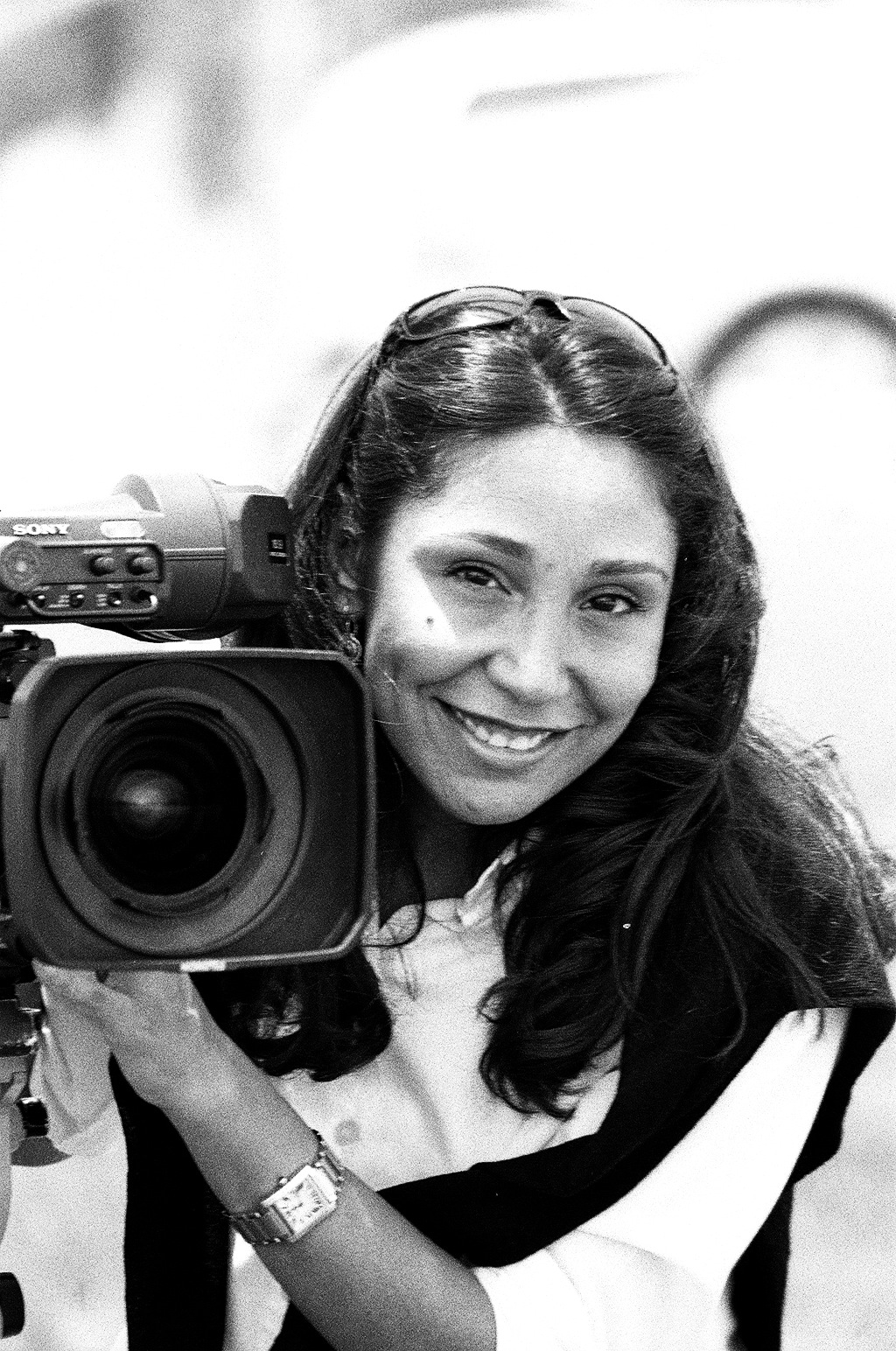
Haifaa Al-Mansour, Saudi film director

The cinema of Saudi Arabia is a fairly small industry that only produces a few feature films and documentaries every year. For much of the late 20th century, public cinema was prohibited. However, since the lifting of the ban in 2018, the industry has undergone rapid expansion as part of the country’s economic diversification and cultural development efforts under Vision 2030.

== History ==
=== Early history and pre cinema era ===
Film culture in Saudi Arabia developed through private screenings and expatriate hosted exhibitions in the mid 20th century. These activities were generally limited in scale and were not supported by a public theatrical exhibition network. Early filmmaking efforts, such as Athubab (1950) and Ta’anib Addamir (1966), are among the country’s earliest narrative film experiments, although access to such works remained limited.

=== Cinema Ban (1980s–2017) ===
Theaters were closed after religious activism in the 1980s. With the exception of one IMAX theater in Khobar, there were no cinemas in Saudi Arabia from 1983 to 2018, although there was occasional talk of opening movie theaters, and in 2008 conference rooms were rented to show the Saudi comedy film Mennahi. As a result, film viewing largely took place through television, home video, and travel to neighboring countries. Cinemas were banned for 35 years until the first cinema in Saudi Arabia opened on 18 April 2018 in Riyadh.

Before cinemas were allowed to operate in Saudi Arabia, there were several attempts to introduce cinema in the country, beginning in the 1930s by Aramco employees. These attempts continued in the 1950s, 1970s, and throughout the first decade of the second millennium.

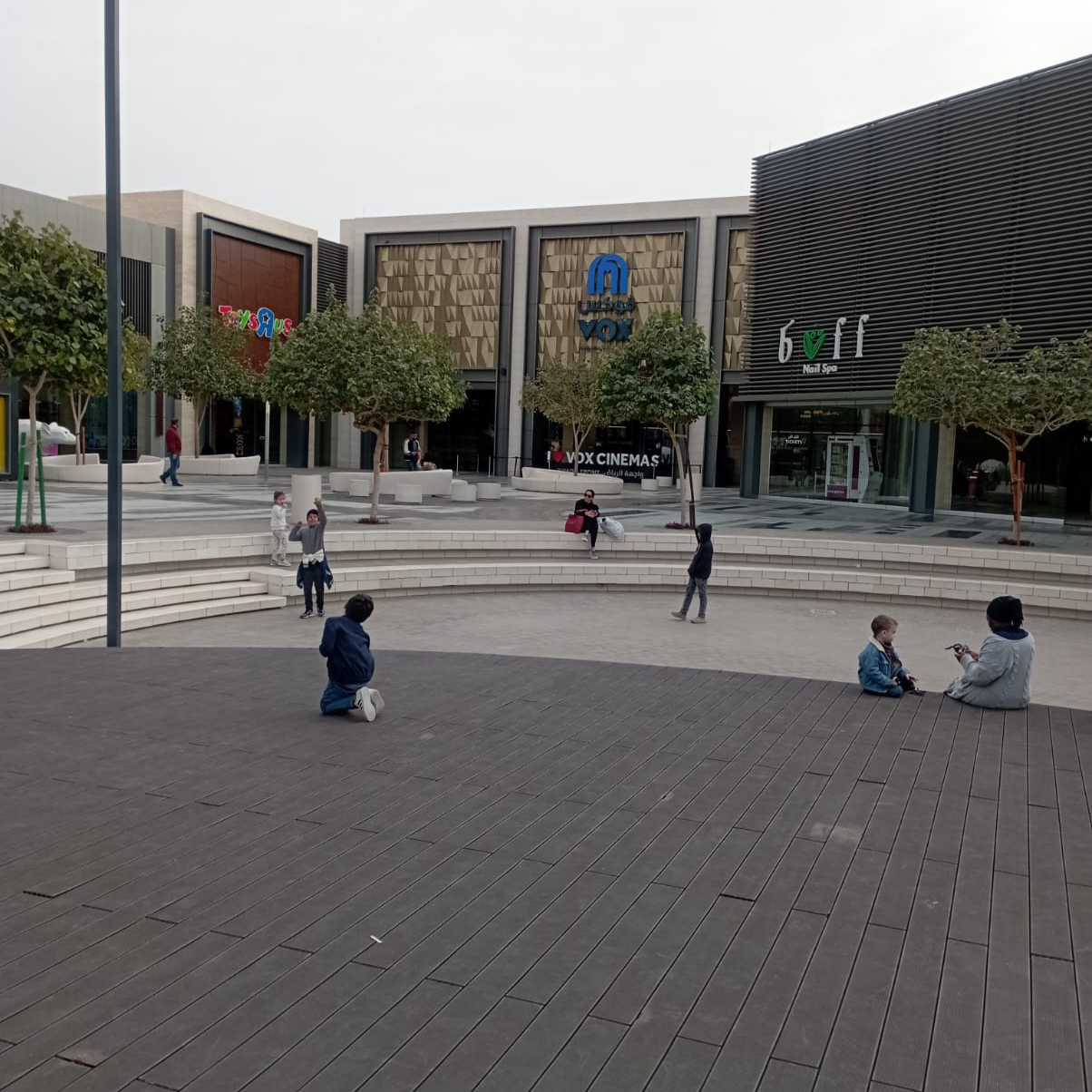
VOX Cinemas movie theater (center) at Riyadh Front in 2023.

Cinemas first started to appear in Saudi Arabia during the 1930s, when employees of Aramco (then called the Arabian American Oil Company) installed screens in their residential compounds in Dhahran. In the early 1950s, ahwash (courtyard) cinemas emerged in several Saudi cities, which were screenings held in open spaces in residential areas. Each of these courtyard cinemas came to be known by the names of their owners.

In the 1970s, a number of Saudi athletic clubs contained movies, and they were not considered un-Islamic, though they were seen as contrary to Arab cultural norms. In the 1980s, there were some improvised movie halls in Saudi Arabia, most of which were in Jeddah and Mecca, where Egyptian, Indian, and Turkish films were screened without government intervention. All theaters were closed due to the growing objections of religious conservatives during the Islamic revival movement in the 1980s. As a political response to an increase in Islamist activism, including the 1979 seizure of the Grand Mosque in Mecca, the government closed all cinemas and theaters.

=== Reopening of cinemas (2017–2018) ===
In December 2017, the Board of Directors of the General Commission for Audiovisual Media in Saudi Arabia agreed to issue licenses to those wishing to open cinemas in the Kingdom. This policy shift was framed as a means of diversifying the economy, expanding cultural offerings, and retaining entertainment spending domestically. Public screenings resumed in April 2018 with the opening of the first licensed commercial cinema in Riyadh, featuring mainstream international films.

The Commission has announced that the “Launch the Cinema Sector in the Kingdom” initiative, which is one of the Quality-of-Life Program initiatives under Vision 2030 programs, has successfully achieved its target of increasing the number of cinemas in Saudi Arabia to 53 in 2021. Cinema of Saudi Arabia, whether locally-produced or foreign-sourced, is subject to Saudi censorship.

The first Saudi film, titled “Al-Thubab” and starring Hassan Al-Ghanim, was produced in 1950, though Keif al-Hal?, released in 2006, was billed as Saudi Arabia's first film. It was shot in the United Arab Emirates and the lead female was played by a Jordanian. The film Shadows of Silence was released in the same year, directed by Abdullah Al-Muhaisen.

The 2012 film Wadjda had an all-Saudi cast and was the first feature film shot entirely in Saudi Arabia. The film Barakah Meets Barakah by director Mahmoud Sabbagh was shot in Jeddah in 2015, premiered at the 66th Berlin International Film Festival, making it the first feature film to participate in the festival. Sameera Aziz is the first Saudi filmmaker in Bollywood.

=== Expansion ===
The network of cinemas expanded rapidly, attracting global operators and local chains. By 2026, the Kingdom generated more than $26 million at the box office, underscoring the rapid growth of exhibition infrastructure and audience engagement.

== Films ==
=== Film production ===
The first Saudi film ever produced was in 1950, starring Hassan Al-Ghanim, who is widely considered to be the first Saudi movie actor. “Al-Thubab” was produced in coordination with a Hollywood production team and filmed in the city of Qatif.

In the mid-1960s, a few films were produced for TV by Saudi Television. However, the true beginning of Saudi cinematic production wasn’t until 1966, when director Saad Al Furaih created "Remorse", tarring Saudi actor Hassan Dardir.

Over a decade later, in 1975, Saudi director Abdullah Al-Muhaisen created a film about the development of the city of Riyadh, and the film was shown at the Cairo International Film Festival the following year. In 1977, Al-Muhaisen would go on to direct a critically acclaimed film called “Death of a City,” which was a dramatization of the Lebanese Civil War that depicted the devastating damage the conflict had on the beautiful city of Beirut.

Keif al-Hal? triggered a debate on the country's stance on cinemas and films. The documentary short film directed by Abdullah Al-Eyaf called Cinema 500 km discussed the issue of banning movie theaters and the film prompted the media to take up the issue and discuss it. Wadjda was selected as the Saudi Arabian entry for the Best Foreign Language Film at the 86th Academy Awards - the first time the country made a submission for the Oscars - but it was not nominated. It earned a nomination for Best Foreign Film at the 2014 BAFTA Awards.

Barakah Yoqabil Barakah was the first feature film from Saudi Arabia to participate in the Berlin International Film Festival; it won a jury award at the festival.

== Video rental stores ==
Video rental stores started appearing in the 1980s and offered Arabic, Western, and Asian movies. By the late 1990s, the increasing number of free-to-air satellite TV channels led most video stores to close.

== Saudi films ==
A small but growing number of films have been produced in Saudi Arabia with a Saudi cast. Notable Saudi films include:

- Dhilal al Sammt (Shadow of Silence; 2006)
- Cinema 500 km (2006)
- Keif al-Hal? (2006)
- Women without Shadows (Nisaa Bil Thil; 2006)
- I Don' Wanna (2008)
- Shadow (2008)
- Three Men and a Woman (2008)
- According to Local Time (2008)
- Sunrise/Sunset (2008)
- Last Day (2008)
- Project (2008)
- The Morning of Night (2008)
- Downtown Mission (2008)
- Mennahi (2009)
- Hidden Evil (2009)
- Forgotten Village (2009)
- Wadjda (2012)
- My Struggle (2014)
- Barakah Meets Barakah (2016)
- Amra and the Second Marriage (2018)
- Roallem (2019)
- The Perfect Candidate (2019)
- Zero Distance (2019)
- Farkash (2019)
- Last Visit (2019)
- Scales (2019)
- Dunya's Day (2019)
- Born a King (2019)
- Lost Memory (2019)
- Swan Song (2019)
- Arabian Alien (2019)
- The Last Days of the Circus (2019)
- Shams Al-Ma'arif (2020)
- Masameer: The Movie (2020)
- The Tambour of Retribution (2020)
- Before We Forget (2021)
- Rupture (2021)
- Arbaoon Aman wa Laylah (2021)
- Walad Marzouq (2021)
- Becoming (2021)
- Route 10 (2022)
- Raven Song (2022)
- Sattar (2022)
- Alkhallat+ (2023)
- Valley Road (2023)
- Alhamour H.A. (2023)
- That Abandoned Place (2023)
- The Woodman (2023)
- The Last Postmen (2023)
- Slave (2023)
- Mandoob (2023)
- NAGA (2023)
- Hajjan (2023)
- Norah (2023)
- Within Sand (2024)

== Films shot in Saudi Arabia ==
- Le Schiave Esistono Ancora (Italian; 1964)
- Exile Family Movie (Austrian; 2006)
- Le Grand Voyage (French; 2004) - partly filmed in Mecca
- Malcolm X (American; 1992) - the first non-documentary to be given permission to film in Mecca
- Wadjda (Saudi-German; 2012)
- Barakah Meets Barakah (Saudi; 2016)
- A Hologram for the King (English; 2016)
- The Perfect Candidate (Saudi; 2019)
- Dunki (film) (Hindi; 2023)
- Desert Warrior (British; 2020) filmed in NEOM in Tabuk city
- Cherry (American; 2021) - Scenes were shot in AlUla and Riyadh
- Kandahar (American; 2023) filmed in AlUla
- 7 Dogs (Saudi; 2026) - filmed in Riyadh

== International presence ==
=== Saudi Film Days in Los Angeles ===
As part of the “Saudi Film Days” initiative, launched by King Abdulaziz Center for World Culture – Ithra in 2016, the center sponsored the production of 10 winning films (nine short films and one short narrative). 7 of the 10 films (6 narrative and one documentary) were nominated to participate in a major film festival hosted in Los Angeles, USA.

The festival included screenings that were attended by notable critics, stars, and directors from the American film industry. Filmmakers were also able to visit some of the most renowned production houses in Hollywood, such as Warner Bros and Paramount Studios.

The films that participated in the festival were: "Tongue" directed by Mohamed Al-Salman, "Zaina's Cake" by director Nada Al-Mojadedi, "The Other" by director Tawfik Al-Zaidi, "Basta" by director Hind Al-Fahhad, "Bilal: A New Breed of Hero" produced by Ayman Jamal, "Atoor" by director Hussain Al-Mutlaq, "Epouvantail" by director Mohammed Al-Salman, "Is Sumiyati Going to Hell?" by director Meshal Al-Jaser, "Wasati" by director Ali Al-Kalthami, "The Darkness Is A Color" by director Mujtaba Saeed, and "300 KM" by director Mohammed Al-Holayyil, in addition to "Al-Qatt" by director Faisal Al-Otaibi.

=== Saudi Films on Netflix ===
In 2020, the world’s leading entertainment streaming platform, Netflix, acquired exclusive rights to 6 Saudi short films produced by Telfaz 11 Studios. The short films were released under the title “Six Windows in the Desert” and included: "Is Sumiyati Going to Hell? " "The Rat," "Curtain," "Wasati," "Predicament in Sight," and "27th of Shaban." Subsequently, further films were released to the platform, including titles such as: “The Tambour of Retribution," "Alkhallat+," "Zero Distance," "Shams Al-Ma'arif," "Barakah Meets Barakah," "Takki," "Route 10" and "Roll'em." Shortly after, 11 more Saudi films were added to Netflix under the title “New Saudi Voices. These films included: "Hallucinated," "Little Bird," "Red Circle," "Covida the 19th," "Alrufea," "The Day I Lost Myself," "Acceptance Land," "Hide and Seek," "Whisper Down the Lane," "The Palm Witch," and "The Jakar."

=== Recent Screenings at the Toronto Film Festival ===
Recently, the films "NAGA" by director Meshal Al-Jaser, "Hajjan" by Abu Bakr Shawqi, and "Mandoob" by Ali Al-Kalthami were screened at the 2023 Toronto Film Festival.

== Saudi films in Arab and international festivals and awards ==
- Saudi films and filmmakers have won numerous awards in both Arab and international film festivals. The first Saudi film to win an international award was "Death of a City," directed by Saudi filmmaker Abdullah Al-Muhaisen. The film received the Nefertiti Prize for Best Short Film in 1977 and was screened at the Cairo Film Festival the same year.
- The Saudi film "Sanctity," received international recognition, winning the Golden Aleph at the 2013 Beirut International Film Festival and becoming the first Saudi film to participate in the prestigious Berlin International Film Festival.
- In October 2013, the Saudi film "Wadjda" made history as the first Saudi film ever nominated for the Oscars for Best Foreign Film. The film also received three honorary awards at the Venice International Film Festival, marking the first time a Saudi feature film received recognition at this renowned event. Additionally, it was nominated for the Best Foreign Language Film award by the British Academy of Film and Television Arts (BAFTA).
- In 2017, the Saudi film "Wasati" won two awards at the Williamsburg International Film Festival in New York: Best Foreign Film and Best Director for Ali Al-Kalthami.
- The short Saudi film "Is Sumiyati Going to Hell?" directed by Meshal Al-Jaser and produced by Ithra, won the Best Foreign Film award at the Los Angeles Independent Film Festival and was screened at the Cannes Film Festival in 2018, along with eight other Saudi films.
- In 2019, "Last Visit" won the Jury Prize at the 18th edition of the Marrakech Film Festival.
- The 2019 short film "Zero Distance," directed by Abdul Aziz Al-Shalahi, won the Golden Palm award at the Alexandria Film Festival.
- In December 2020, "The Tambour of Retribution" won two awards at the Cairo International Film Festival: the Salah Abu Seif Jury Award and Best Actor for Faisal Al-Dokhei. In April 2021, director Abdul Aziz Al-Shalahi won the Best Director award for" The Tambour of Retribution" at the Malmö Arab Film Festival in Sweden. The Saudi Film Commission announced in November 2021 that "The Tambour of Retribution" was selected to represent Saudi Arabia at the Oscars for Best International Feature Film.

== Saudi directors ==
- Abdullah Al-Muhaisen
- Abdulelah Alqurashi
- Mohammad Makki
- Abdullah Al-Eyaf
- Haifaa al-Mansour
- Yousef Linjawi
- Mohammad Aldhahri
- Mohammad Al Khalif
- Abdulmuhsin Almutairi
- Hussam Alhulwah
- Mohammed Alhamoud
- Abdulmohsen Al-Dhabaan
- Nawaf Almuhanna
- Mohammed Salman
- Mohammed Albash
- Mosa Althounian
- Mohana Abdullah
- Mahmoud Sabbagh
- Gigi Hozimah
- Abdulmuhsen Alquseer
- Sameera Aziz
- Shahad Ameen
- Abdulaziz Alnajim
- Ali Alameer
- Radwan Khaled
- Malik Nejer
- Sameer Arif
- Talal Ayeel
- Fahad Alesta
- Mujtaba Saeed
- Mohammed Alsalman
- Ali Alkalthami
- Meshal Aljaser
- Mohammed Alholayyil
- Suhaib Qudus
- Faris Qudus
- Ali Alsumayin
- Shahad Ameen
- Hana Alomair
- Diya Yousef
- Raed Alsemari
- Faisal Alamer
- Ali Saeed
- Mahmoud Alhamoud

== Saudi actors ==
- Hisham Fageeh
- Ahd Kamel
- Fatima Al-Banawi
- Hind Mohammed
- Hisham Abdulrahman
- Abdullah Al-Sadhan
- Nasir Al-Gasabi
- Habib Al-Habib
- Yusof Al-Jarrah
- Mohammed Baksh
- Mushari Hilal
- Reem Abdullah
- Ahmed Khalil
- Mariam Al-Ghamdi
- Fayez Al-Malki
- Hassan Assiri
- Rashid Al-Shamrani
- Saad Khadr
- Bashir Ghoneim
- Baraa Alem
- Ibrahim Al-Hsawi
- Ismail Hassan
- Mila Al-Zahrani
- Khairia Abu Laban
- Ibrahim Alkhairallah
- Ibrahim Al-Hajjaj
- Khaled Saqer
- Elham Ali
- Suhaib Qudus
- Faisal Al-Dokhei
- Mohammed AlShehri
- Fahad Albutairi
- Saleh Abuamrh
- Saad Abdulaziz
- Asayel Mohammed

== See also ==
- Censorship in Saudi Arabia
- Cinema of the world
- Culture of Saudi Arabia
- Egyptian cinema
- Arab cinema
- Cinema of the Middle East
