= List of Saudi Arabian films =

A list of films produced in Saudi Arabia.

== # ==
- 7 Dogs (2026)

== A ==
- Architecture of Mud (1999)

== B ==
- Barakah Meets Barakah (2016)

== C ==
- Champions (2021)
- Cinema 500 km (2006)

== D ==
- Dhilal al sammt (2006)

== E ==
- Esaaf (2025)

== H ==
- Heart Crime (2023)
- Hijra (2025)

== J ==
- Jazirat al-Arab (1955)

== K ==
- Keif al-Hal? (2006)

== L ==
- Langage du geste (1973)
- The Last Dismissal (2023)

== M ==
- Menahi (2009)
- Masameer: The Movie (2020)
- Masameer Junior (2025)

== N ==
- Naga (2023)
- Night Courier (2023)

== O ==
- Ode to My Mother (2014)
- One Day in the Haram (2017)

== P ==
- Phosphine (2014)

== R ==
- Rawahel (2014)

== S ==
- Sahraa, Al- (2008)
- Saify (2024)
- Sons of Nouf (2022)

== T ==
- The Perfect Candidate (2019)
- Three Queens (2006)
- The Tambour of Retribution (2020)
- The 8th day of the week (2020)

== W ==
- Wadjda (2012)
- Who Killed $arah?!: Vol.1 (2014)
- Within Sand (2024)
