= Fahad Albutairi =

Saudi stand-up comedian

Fahad Albutairi فهد البتيري
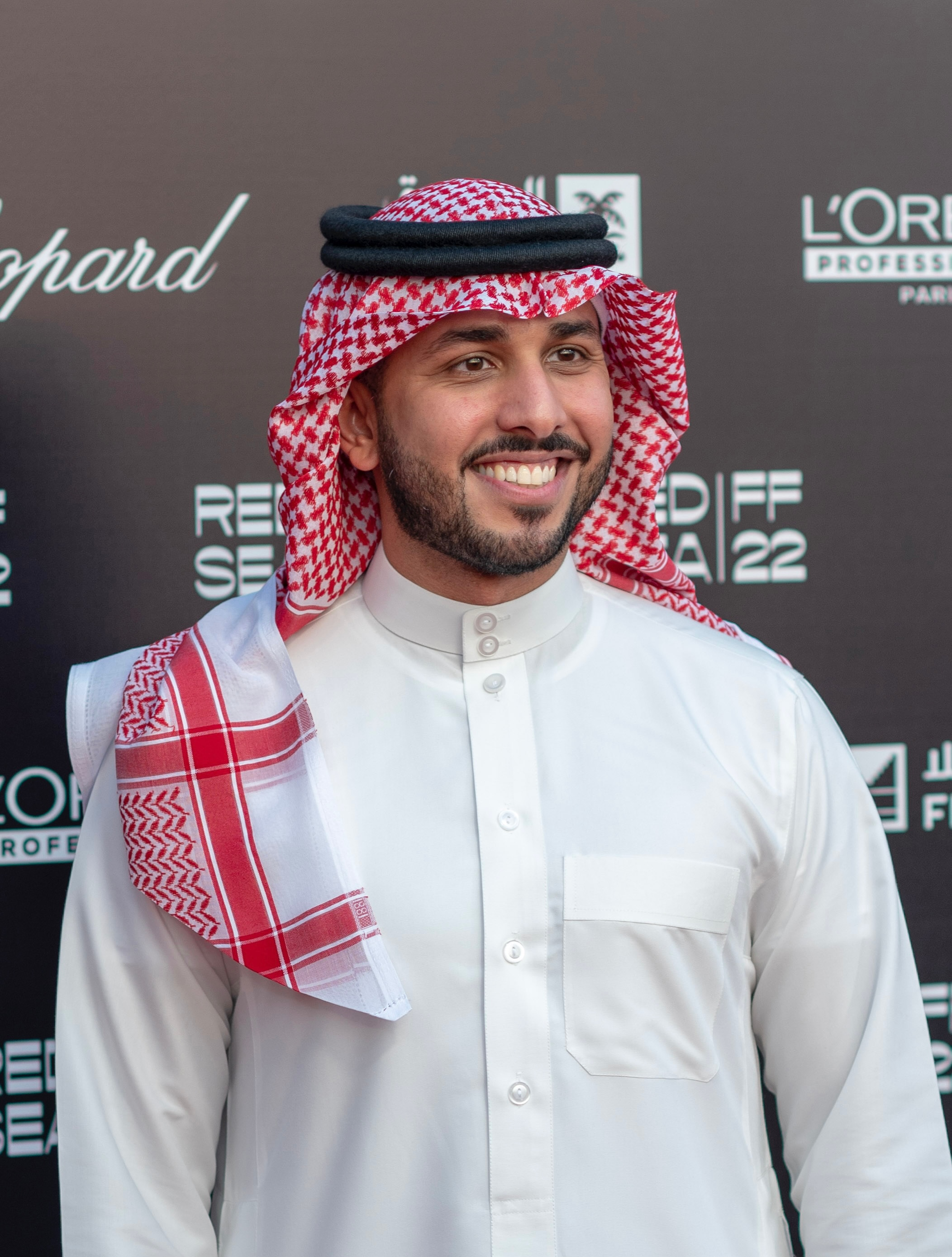
- Albutairi in 2022
- Born: 12 May 1984 (age 42); Khobar, Saudi Arabia
- Education: University of Texas at Austin
- Spouse: Loujain al-Hathloul (m. 2014–2018)

Comedy career
- Years active: 2006–present
- Medium: Stand-up, YouTube, film, television
- Genres: Observational comedy, Satire, Character comedy, Improvisational comedy
- Website: fahadalbutairi.com

Fahad al-Butairi (Arabic: فهد البتيري Fáhád al-Butáyry; born 13 May 1984) is a Saudi stand-up comedian, actor and screenwriter. Albutairi became the first Saudi Arabian comedian to perform on stage professionally in Saudi Arabia and in the whole of the Arab states of the Persian Gulf. He is also one of the most notable YouTube personalities from the country.

== Life and career ==
Fahad Albutairi was born in Khobar, Saudi Arabia. Albutairi began performing stand-up comedy as a student at the University of Texas at Austin, from which he graduated in December 2007. His first material dealt with his identity as a Saudi foreign student studying in post-9/11 America. He considers his real start to have been at the open mic nights at local comedy clubs in Austin. His debut as a stand-up comedian in the Arab World was on 2 October 2008, opening for Ahmed Ahmed and Maz Jobrani in Bahrain alongside a host of other local comedians as part of the Axis of Evil Comedy Tour.

Since then, he has shared the stage with the likes of Gabriel Iglesias, Sebastian Maniscalco, Bobby Lee, Erik Griffin, Dean Edwards, Angelo Tsarouchas, Aron Kader and Dean Obeidallah. Albutairi performs regularly in Saudi Arabia. Although he was initially worried about how audiences in Saudi Arabia might receive stand-up comedy, his first performance in Riyadh in February 2009 attracted over 1,200 audience members. On 3 November 2009, Albutairi was chosen out of 65 English-speaking contestants as the winner of the "Be a Part of the Amman Stand-up Comedy Festival 2009" contest.

On 18 March 2010, Fahad Albutairi took part in Yemen's first-ever stand-up comedy showcase along with fellow Saudi comedians Khalid Khalifa and Ibraheem Alkhairallah and Egyptian-American comedian Ahmed Ahmed. He also took part in the "New Faces of Arab Comedy" showcase at the 2010 New York Arab-American Comedy Festival and was one of the "New Faces" to be chosen for the "Best of the Fest" night of the festival.

In March 2013, both The Washington Post and The National named Fahad Albutairi the "Seinfeld of Saudi Arabia." Fahad was also chosen to be on the panel of judges for the largest online stand-up comedy competition in the region, "The Kit Kat Comedy Break Show."

On 15 January 2016, Fahad Albutairi performed at the Hollywood Laugh Factory with Maz Jobrani, Tony Rock, Steve Hofstetter and many others. He was the first Saudi professional stand-up comedian to perform at the Laugh Factory.

=== La Yekthar Show and Telfaz11 ===
In 2010, Fahad Albutairi has started his own show on YouTube entitled La Yekthar Show, which is a Saudi colloquial term that roughly translates to "put a lid on it." Discussing the fact that his show is created solely for distribution on YouTube, although he initially considered moving to acting on television following the success of his stand-up comedy, Albutairi explained that "the Hollywood dream is not really applicable in the region, especially with mega-networks." According to Albutairi, this is because, "in Saudi Arabia, a lot of stuff is done in-house, the casting, the production, the writing."

He started the YouTube channel with fellow Saudi comedian Ibraheem Alkhairallah, who writes the show with Albutairi, and Saudi directors Ali Kalthami and Alaa Yoosef. So far, it has been one of the fastest growing Saudi Arabian YouTube channels, getting more than 4,000 subscribers in its first month, and reaching one million subscribers in its 3rd season of the show. It is currently one of the most subscribed Saudi channels on YouTube. La Yekthar's most popular video has received over five million views.

In terms of content, Albutairi has explained that the show deals symbolically with some socio-political issues in Saudi Arabia: "Each character kind of represents a socio-political issue." These include corruption, symbolized by "a tall guy who wears a shemagh;" unemployment represented by "a guy who wears a ragged thobe and carries a green folder;" and traffic problems symbolized by "a guy chained to a concrete block, the sort found in road works."

The success of the show has allowed for the foundation of Telfaz11, a network for distributing online entertainment content, and the creation of a spin-off YouTube show entitled Temsa7LY, created entirely for the crocodile puppet character that was first featured on La Yekthar. Temsa7LY now has over 2 million subscribers and over 100 million video views.

Since then, Albutairi has worked on many of the other YouTube channels within the Telfaz11 network. In 2016, Albutairi left Telfaz11 to focus on his TV and film career.

=== Filmography ===
Film
| Year | Title | Role | Notes |
|---|---|---|---|
| 2015 | From A to B | Yousef 'Jay' | |
| 2019 | Rashid & Rajab | Fahad | |
| 2020 | A Love Above the Law | Writer | In development |
| 2023 | Alkhallat+ | Faisal | |
| 2024 | Al Eid Eiden | Rashid | |
| 2025 | Esaaf | Faisal | |

Television
| Year | Title | Role | Notes |
|---|---|---|---|
| 2012 | Night Shift / شفت الليل | Unnamed Shopper | Episode: "In a Supermarket Very Very Soon / في سوبر ماركت قريب جداً جداً"; Channel(s): Rotana Khalijia |
| 2017 | American Dad! | Bear Grylls (Arabic) | Episode: "The Bitchin' Race"; Uncredited voice |
| 2017 | CUT | Abdulrahman | Channel(s): MBC 1 and Shahid |
| 2021 | The Fates Hotel | Screenwriter | Channel(s): Shahid |
| 2022 | Al-Maktab (The Office Saudi Arabia) | Talal Al-Buwaibani / Writer | Channel(s): MBC 1 and Shahid |
| 2024 | Al-Naseem High School (Thanaweyat Al Naseem) | Abu Wael | Channel(s): MBC 1 and Shahid |
| 2025 | Hurooj | Divorce Club Member | Channel(s): Shahid |
| 2025 | Rare Cases (Halat Nadira) | Dr. Khaled Bin Fayez | Channel(s): Shahid |
| 2025 | Red or White (Ahmar Walla Abyadh | Faisal | Channel(s): Shahid |
