= Hisham Fageeh =

Saudi Arabian comedian (born 1987)

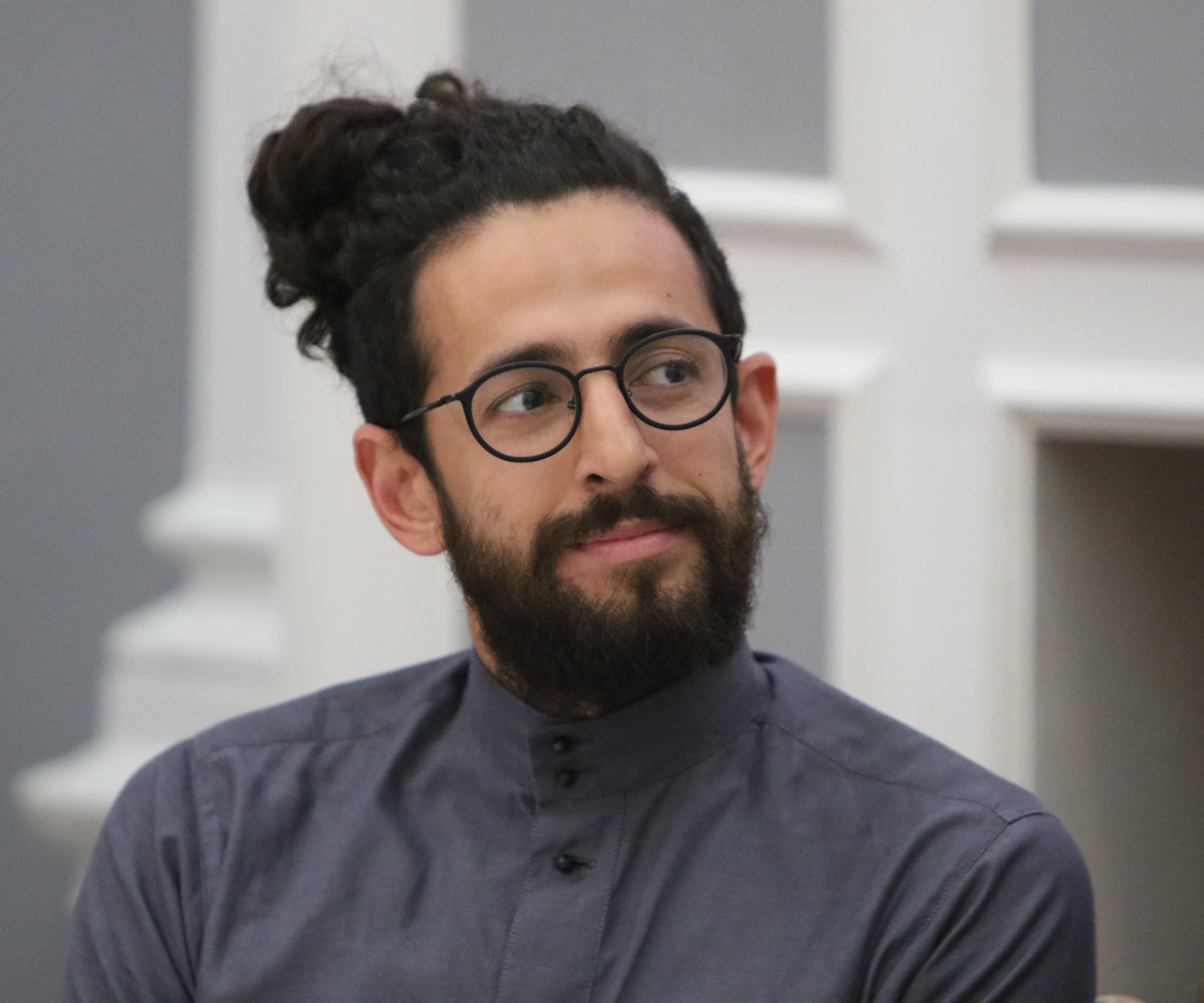
- Fageeh in 2018
- Born: October 26, 1987 (age 38); Riyadh, Saudi Arabia

Comedy career
- Years active: 2011 – 2017
- Medium: Stand-up, YouTube
- Genres: observational comedy, satire, character comedy, improvisational comedy, anti-comedy, surreal humor

Hisham Fageeh (Arabic: هشام فقيه; born October 26, 1987) is a comedian and actor from Saudi Arabia.

== Early life ==
Fageeh was born in Riyadh, Saudi Arabia.

== Career ==
Fageeh co-produced and starred in Saudi Arabia's submission to the Oscars for 2016's Best Foreign Film, Barakah Meets Barakah. His work has been written about by The New York Times, Vanity Fair, Rolling Stone, BBC, Variety, among others. Most-known for his 2013 viral video "No Woman, No Drive" which amassed more than 17 million views, Hisham started performing stand-up while working on Capitol Hill in Washington, DC.

During his Master's at Columbia University, he studied improvisational comedy at the Upright Citizens Brigade Theater (UCBT). He started a web series (Hisham's Weeklies) before doing stand-up in Saudi Arabia. Within a year Fageeh was taking the stage with comedians Dean Obeidallah, Maysoon Zayid, Aasif Mandvi, Aron Kader, and Hari Kondabolu. He began performing in Arabic after his satirical blog YouTube series "Isboo'iyat Hisham" (Hisham's Weeklies) went viral in December 2011, he joined the ranks of Fahad Albutairi and Bader Saleh in the Saudi stand-up circuits.

Fageeh is said to be as the first Saudi to perform in Gotham Theater and headline an Arabic stand-up comedy tour in the United States and England. He was previously Head of Content at Telfaz11, a multi-channel network with 12 million subscribers and more than one billion views. Fageeh was a featured performer in the 2012 New York Arab-American Comedy Festival, both in the "New Faces" and "Haram night" shows. Fageeh is known for his report from New York for La Yekthar. This segment of La Yekthar has been covered by the BBC and the GlobalPost.

== Personal life ==
Fageeh is married to a woman from Saudi Arabia. They met on Twitter and had to go to Bahrain to date.

== Filmography ==
Year	Film	Role	Notes
2010	Le Yekhtar Show	Himself	Series
2011	Hisham Weeklies	Himself	Series
2012	The Dangers of Smoking		Short
2013	Khambalah: Stereotype		Short
2013	Daughter		Short
2013	Khambalah: Manhood Academy 2		Short
2013	Tony		Short
2013	Khambalah: Job Opening		Short
2013	La Yekthar: Abo Hayat		Short
2013	No Woman, No Drive		Video
2013	Khambalah: A Victim of Reputation		Short
2014	Khambalah: Carved in Stone		Short
2014	Khambalah: Project DAES	Steve Jobs	Short
2014	Hamith Hiloo		Video Short
2014	Folaim: Ahem Ahem		Short
2014	From A to B	Saudi Officer	Film
2014	Folaim: Cocktail		Short
2014	Kees: Jeddah Is Plastic and Sea		Short
2015	Kees: Damascus Papers		Short
2015	Bedoon Nas: Wear a Suit		Short
2015	Kees: Brushes and Human Beings		Short
2015	Carlos Is Nostalgic for Home		Short
2015	I'm Listening		Short
2015	Khambalah: Manhood Academy 3		Short
2015	Kees: Call the Guardian		Short
2016	Khambalah: Origin of Word		Short
2016	Barakah yoqabil Barakah	Barakah	Film
2017	Folaim: People with Special Needs		Short
