= Aiman Al Ziyoud =

Jordanian businessman

- Born: Amman, Jordan
- Occupation: Producer
- Years active: 1994–present
- Notable work: Adam, Musicana

Aiman Al Ziyoud is the founder and CEO of Charisma Group, an Arabic television production company, where he leads the development of Arabic TV content. He is also known as the host of Adam, and the longest running hit game show in Arab Television history for 16 consecutive years “Huroof wa aloof”.

He began his career as a news editor on the radio/TV branch of the Jordan Radio and Television Corporation. Al Ziyoud also filed for and owned many patents like a patent he filed in 2004 for a Lottery System Real Progressive Jackpot method.

Between 1998 and 2005, Al Ziyoud worked on different capacities at the MBC Group. Al Ziyoud established Charisma in 2005. He held the position of CEO and Executive Producer, responsible for creating and supervising the production of a variety of successful formats.

== Notable achievements ==
- ET bel Arabi (Arabic version of ET)
- Adam
- Menahi
- The Insider Bel Arabi (Arabic version of The Insider)
- Ya Hala on Rotana Khalijiah
- Fashion Time
- Trending on MBC 1
- Ahl Al Azm, philanthropy social media format
