= Izidore Musallam =

Palestinian filmmaker

Izidore Musallam (Arabic: إيزادور مسلم, Hebrew: איזידור מוסלם) is a Palestinian film director, producer and screenwriter who most recently produced the Sci Fi Pictures original film: Savage Planet. He was born in Haifa and graduated with a BFA in film production from York University in Toronto, Ontario, Canada where he now lives and works.

He directed a number of movies including "Foreign Nights" (1989), "Nothing To Lose" (1994), "Heaven Before I Die" (1997), "Adam & Eve" (2002) aka "Forbidden Fruit" and "Hadutha Saghira" (2009). Most notably he directed in 2006 Keif al-Hal?, the first ever Saudi Arabian feature film produced by Rotana.

== See also ==
- Keif al-Hal?
