= Heaven Before I Die =

- Directed by: Izidore Musallam
- Written by: Izidore Musallam
- Produced by: Steven Cole
- Starring: Andy Velasquez; Giancarlo Giannini; Omar Sharif
- Cinematography: Mark Willis
- Music by: George Brasovan
- Release date: 1997
- Country: United States
- Language: English

Heaven Before I Die is a 1997 indie comedy film written and directed by Izidore Musallam and starring Andy Velasquez, Giancarlo Giannini, Joanna Pacula, and Omar Sharif.

== Plot ==
This is the story of an outcast named Jacob, a Palestinian. Jacob's feet are so turned out that he walks like Charlie Chaplin. He is different because of that and decides to emigrate from Palestine to Canada, where "everyone is equal". There everybody treats him kindly, and a thief specializing in stealing money from cash machines takes him into his home and treats him like a son, waitress Selma finds him a job as a Chaplin imitator, and "prophet" Khalil Gibran gives him wise advice.

== Cast ==
- Andy Velasquez as Jacob
- Giancarlo Giannini as Thief
- Joanna Pacula as Selma
- Geoffrey Lower as Sterrea
- Burt Young as Pollof
- Omar Sharif as Kahlil Gibran
- Joseph Bologna
- Cherilee Taylor
- Danny Marks as Leonard Cohen
