= Sameera Aziz =

Saudi journalist, poet, writer, filmmaker, and activist

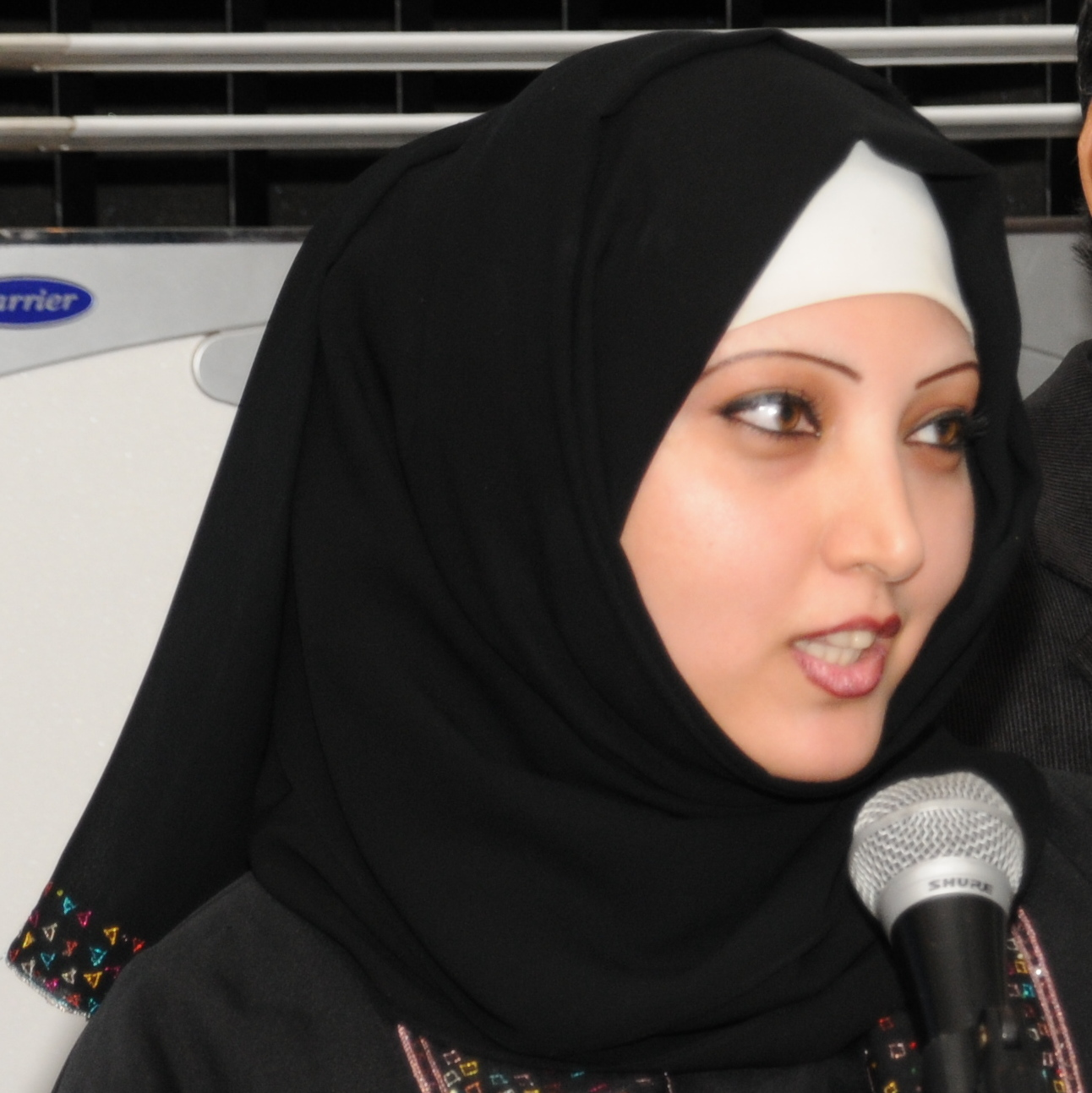
- Aziz in 2008
- Born: 24 June 1979 (age 47); Al-Khober, Saudi Arabia
- Occupations: Journalist, Poet, Writer, Filmmaker, Activist, Businesswoman
- Website: sameeraaziz-group.com

Sameera Aziz (Arabic: سميرة عزيز; born 24 June 1979) is a Saudi media personality, social worker, radio host, and businesswoman. She is a Jeddah-based Saudi national. Her companies are Sameera Aziz Group and Sameera Aziz Entertainment, the latter of which was the first Saudi production house in India. Aziz is the first Saudi female director in Bollywood. Her events company holds a Guinness World Record for making world's largest human-picture mosaic in 2017.

She is the first Saudi novelist to publish in the Urdu language in Saudi Arabia. She was named the ambassador for Women and Children in the Kingdom of Saudi Arabia by the SPMUDA International Organization.

== Early life and education ==
Sameera Aziz was born on 24 June 1976 in Al-Khober, Saudi Arabia, to Aziz-ur-Rehman and Mehar Afroz. She has two brothers, and is the only daughter. Her early education was completed abroad, in Karachi's Gulistan Shah Abdul Latif School, and later at P.E.C.H.S. Girl's College and the University of Karachi. She married at the age of fifteen and completed her education after her marriage. Aziz has two children.

She completed her PhD thesis in trade relations, and earned two master's degrees, one in international relations, and the second in journalism. She then went to the United States to study filmmaking in Hollywood. She did postgraduate work in mass communication and film direction at Livewires-The Media Institute in Mumbai, India. She is currently completing a PhD at Osmania University in Hyderabad, India.

According to the book Sold For Dowry, she was sold as a bride and forbidden to further her education as had been promised. According to Saudi customs, a groom gives the dowry amount to the bride, but the book claims that she was unaware of the dowry amount her step mother took on her behalf, and she was only told that she would be permitted to further her education and pursue a media career after marriage.

== Career ==
Aziz is a chief editor of business and entertainment publications. She is a past president of the Asian Information Agency (AIA), a worldwide news service. She was also the Saudi country head of the South Asian Regional Information Agency, and the voice of SAARC countries (SARIA). She served as the Bureau Chief of the first Saudi independent English news website The Peninsula Times.

Until 2013, she was a senior editor of the Jeddah-based Saudi Gazette, one of the two English-language newspapers printed in the country. She was simultaneously managing editor of Awaz, a youth-oriented weekly Urdu newspaper, published by parent company Okaz, that ceased publication in 2003, and also the managing editor of Fresh, a quarterly magazine published by Saudi Gazette's Okaz publications.

During 1999 she was a writer for Gulf News and several other Pakistan-based newspapers. She also served as the supervising editor of the women's sections in Urdu News and Urdu Magazine, owned by the Saudi Research and Marketing Group.

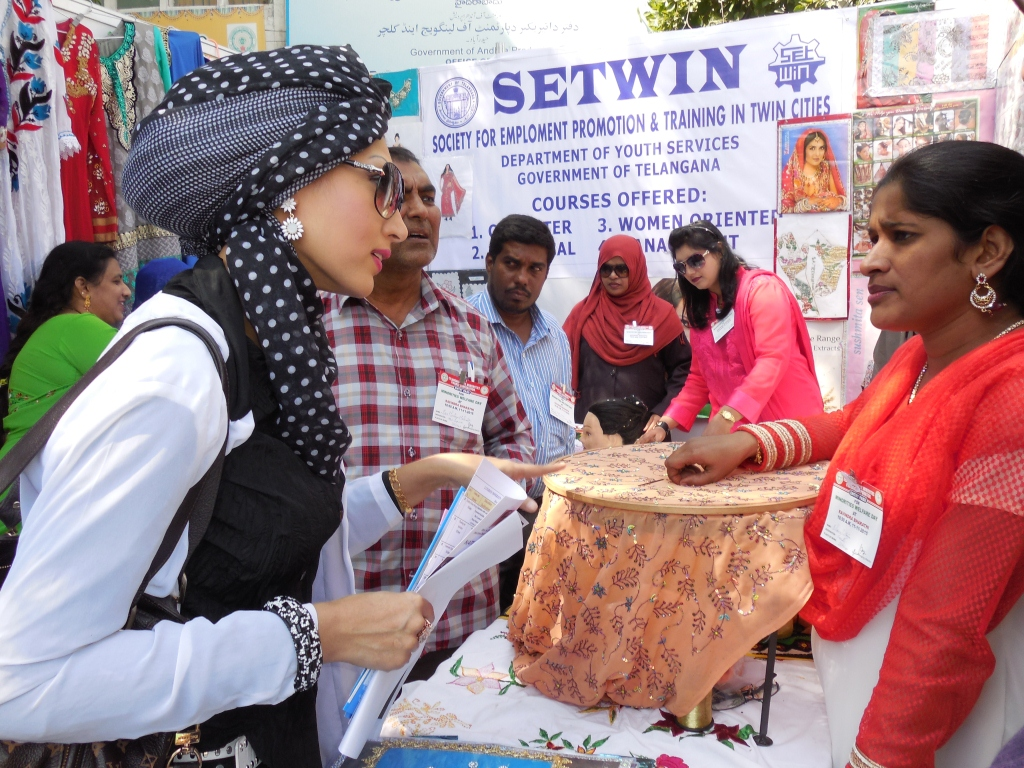
Sameera Aziz with SETWIN worker for a woman development program

Her columns and features are written exclusively in English and Urdu, and translated into other languages. She focuses on Saudi domestic, social, cultural, educational and expatriate's issues, as well as Saudi Arabia's relationship with the international community. She has conducted undercover sting operations. Some of her work considers the challenges of social and labour issues, human rights, women's rights, violence against children, and other topics of concern to the community. Aziz is known as a human rights' volunteer, raising awareness of child marriage. She also spoke out about domestic violence after a TV presenter, Rania Al-Baz, was assaulted by her husband in 2004. In 2009, she wrote and spoke about child abuse that she witnessed.

Aziz has a weekly radio show, "Marhaba with Sameera Aziz," heard on Asian Radio Live, based in the United Kingdom. She is an elected Saudi Director of the United Nations' affiliated Global Sports Federation (GSF).

== Author of fiction and poetry ==
Aziz is the first Saudi novelist of the Urdu Language to publish in Saudi Arabia.

Her poems in the Urdu language have been published in various magazines and newspapers. She has participated in poetic symposia and has received awards. In July 2006, she wrote a heart-wrenching anthem "Lahu Lahu Lebanon" (Lebanon under blood) for her campaign to support Lebanese victims in 2006 Lebanon War, also called "the 2006 Israel–Hezbollah War." Aziz received permanent honor of one of the top 100 influential media members list under the hospitality of Saudi Arabian Society for Culture & Arts in Madina City under the Saudi Ministry of Culture.

== Film and stage work ==
Aziz was a production team member for Kauthar Media in Jeddah, Saudi Arabia. She worked as a production assistant with Saudi producer, actor, and director Dr. Fahad Ghazoli in many Saudi projects such as the film "Lamar," the comic stage play "Hala Barra," and a drama serial that ran for 12 episodes. She was also an assistant and a production team member for director Majed Azzi on the film "Hayath," produced by Al-Mpda Media. She also wrote, directed, and acted in a women-only comedy stage play which was presented by the Silsila Organization for Women in Jeddah.

Her Production House Sameera Aziz Entertainment in Jeddah is interlinked with her Bollywood Production House services in India.

== Feminist controversies ==
Aziz has been criticized for the feminist content of her fiction and journalism. She enraged some men in her audience when she presented a Ghazal against male-dominated society in 1999 at a jam-packed auditorium in Jeddah, Saudi Arabia. However, she also received a standing ovation from many of the women present, and even some of the men, as she left the hall.

She was the only female speaker at an International Day for the Elimination of Violence against Women in Jeddah on 10 December 2014, which was the last day of UN women's 16-day global campaign of activism against gender violence. The event was organized by The National Society of Human Rights. She spoke about the international criticism that Saudi Arabia has often received for its lack of laws protecting women and domestic workers from abuse. "But this is not the case anymore. Saudi Arabia has outlawed domestic violence and this problem is already being acknowledged here. There is a legal ban on physical and sexual violence and other forms of abuse against women in Saudi Arabia, which applies both at home or within the workplace," she said.

Aziz supports women driving in Saudi Arabia. However, she does not support civil disobedience. She asked for lenience for those women in Saudi Arabia who defied their nation's de facto ban on women driving by getting behind the steering wheel herself.

She is a special adviser for International Affairs and Women's Rights for the Journalist Foundation.

== Volunteer work and activism ==
Aziz runs a social media campaign, #SupportSmile, with her team, Desi Vines and The Khalli Walli Show to promote what she calls a culture of smiles, love, and peace. She also consults for various international organizations focusing on social development and human rights such as the National Society for Human Rights (NSHR), We the Youth, and the Society For International Peace.

She has become a voice for labor rights, focusing on the ill treatment of and crimes against domestic workers in Saudi Arabia.

Aziz works to bridge the gap between Saudi Arabia and the rest of the world. She has stated an agenda of dispelling various misconceptions about Saudi Arabia. Sameera Aziz was the most awaited speaker at Pakistan's first-ever International Media Conference titled One World One Media, which was organised by the Pakistan Federal Union of Journalists from 1 to 3 May 2015 in Karachi, Pakistan.

Aziz uses sports for cultural and business exchanges that strengthen the Saudi economy. She has been elected as the Director of the United Nations' affiliated Global Sports Federation (GSF). The Global Sports Federation works to bring peace through sports. She stated, "I have been serving internationally in radio, theatre, and conferences as a speaker and writer, but sports and film production is the most powerful mediums of mass-media to convey the message. This is the reason I am utilizing these platforms too."

== Awards ==
Award	Year	Organization	Summary
Youth Ambassador	2007	We The Youth, a UN-affiliated organization to promote talent	She was especially appreciated by young people for her sting operations. She was the first Saudi Journalist to go undercover in the year 2000.
Humanity Award	2008	A non-political, social & welfare organization.	She received an award for "high performances for humanity."
Pride of the Nation Award	2009	-	A ceremony for Sameera Aziz.'
The Woman of Today	2012	The Ladies Night Event	Sameera Aziz was paid tribute in Jeddah.
Best Ind-o-Pak Friendship Icon award	29 January 2014	Pak-O-Hindh Literary Forum	She received this award at a show in Riyadh.
Accolade	-	An evening with a personality.	An open session by a community organization.
Accolade	-	A Morning with Sameera Aziz	An open session by a community organization.
Nominee for Best Saudi Female Journalist & Media Person	upcoming	iiGlobal Awards Org	Women Leaders in Saudi Arabia Awards nominated Sameera Aziz for this Award.
Maulana Abul Kalam Azad special award	11 November 2015	Telangana State Govt. of India	She became the first Saudi woman to be recognized for the promotion of the Urdu language in Saudi Arabia. This award recognized her work as a bridge between Saudi Arabia and the world.
Salam India Award	6 February 2016	Maharashtra State Govt. of India	Poetry book award at a launch ceremony in Mumbai, India.
Gr8! Woman Award- The Great Cultural Icon of the Middle East	19 March 2016	The sixth GR8! Women Awards 2016- Middle East	She became the first Saudi woman to receive this international award.
Art & Literature Award	23 April 2016	Granthappura Jeddah	The South Indian community gave her this award for her contributions to arts and literature in Saudi Arabia.
Maulana Fareed Al Waheedi Award	13 May 2016	Gulf Urdu Council (GUC) Jeddah Saudi Arabia gave this award to Sameera Aziz	She received this award for her worldwide services in Urdu Literature and Media.
Media Award	8 March 2017	Islam GymKhana of Mumbai, India, gave this award to Aziz.	She received the "Moderate Female Muslim Media Icon 2017" on International Women's Day.
Special award for the top 100 Saudi people in media	8 November 2018	The Saudi Arabian Society for Culture and Arts (SASCA) under the Saudi Ministry of Culture in Madinah AlMunawarah gave her this award.	She was awarded permanent membership in SASCA as one of the top 100 influential Saudi media personalities.
Business Excellence Award	2018	Friends Creation - Riyadh, KSA	She received this for leadership and constant progress in business during a recession.

== Additional sources ==
- Saudi In Focus
- Pride of Pakistan biography
- An article on Sameera Aziz – From obscurity to fame
- Sally Buzbee, "Beyond the Veil – Female Saudi Arabian Journalists", Columbia Journalism Review, September 2001, Volume: 40 Issue: 3 Page: 22.
