= Amman Stand-up Comedy Festival =

Held annually in Amman, Jordan

- Genre: Stand-up comedy
- Location: Amman - Jordan
- Founded: 2008
- Website: www.ascf.jo

Amman Stand-up Comedy Festival is an international stand-up comedy festival held annually in Amman, Jordan. Among the stand-up comedians that participated in the festival include:

- Dean Obeidallah
- Ronnie Khalil
- Ali Al Sayed
- Fahad Albutairi
- Maz Jobrani
- Russell Peters
- Ali Hassan
