= Axis of Evil Comedy Tour =

Comedy tour

The Axis of Evil Comedy Tour is a comedy tour featuring four Middle Eastern comedians and special guest comedians. The tour's name is derived from a speech by US President George W. Bush which designated Iraq, Iran, and North Korea as the "axis of evil". The tour started on 11 November 2005. The group jokes about their culture along with being Middle Eastern in America. All of the comedians state that their lives changed considerably with 9/11, with one member, Egyptian American Ahmed Ahmed, whose name matches the alias used by an Osama bin Laden henchman, noting that he is frequently stopped by airport immigration officials on suspicion of terrorism – including a 12-hour stint in a jail in Las Vegas. On 10 March 2007, they were given their own Comedy Central special. The group broke up in 2011.

The group's current-events sense of humor has attracted media attention. They have been interviewed by CNN, NPR, The New York Times, and Time, among others. They toured in several Middle East countries with Showtime Arabia. King Abdullah II of Jordan has attended their show in Jordan and has conveyed his appreciation of their work.

== Background ==
The Axis of Evil Comedy Tour was founded by standup comedian Ahmed Ahmed, to use jokes to combat post-9/11 prejudice in the United States. Along with Ahmed, Maz Jobrani and Aron Kader had their own personal accounts of racist experiences that they have undergone within the United States, and used these stories as material for the comedy tour. Ahmed Ahmed, the Egyptian American founder of the group, believed that post-9/11 standup material should be tested in the Middle East before traveling anywhere else. Before the group had even been formed, Ahmed had been hired to perform a private fundraiser in Dubai to benefit Palestinian medical students. This led to the tour he called the "Axis of Evil Tour", in which he along with comics Maz Jobrani and Aron Kader traveled the United States with the aim to stop stereotyping and prejudice towards Middle Easterners through a comedic approach.

Jamil Abu-Wardeh, the producer of the Axis of Evil, brought the tour back to its origin, the Middle East. There, the comedy tour gained two additional members, Nemr Abou Nassar and Wonho Chung. Chung was known especially for his ability to present the material in Arabic, despite having a Korean descent. His ability to speak in Arabic and other languages, as well as his charisma, made him a notable addition to the tour. Nassar performed in five sold-out shows, during each of which his performance received a standing ovation. The tour featured performances in Kuwait, UAE, Lebanon, Bahrain, and other Arab countries. According to The New York Times, the result was a success, beginning with the selling out of numerous performances from the first one at Lisner Auditorium at George Washington University.

== Main members ==
National origin	Name	Nationality group
Egypt	Ahmed Ahmed	Egyptian American
Iran	Maz Jobrani	Iranian American
Palestine	Aron Kader	Palestinian American
Palestine	Dean Obeidallah	Palestinian American

=== Guest members ===
National origin	Name	Nationality group
South Korea	Won Ho Chung	Korean Jordanian
Cuba	Carlos Leon	Cuban American
Lebanon	Nick Youssef	Lebanese American
Syria	Helen Maalik	Syrian American

== DVD release ==
After airing on Comedy Central, the Axis of Evil Comedy Tour was released on DVD as a studio special by Image Entertainment on 3 April 2007. It was directed by Primetime Emmy nominee Michael Simon and featured the tour's four main comedians: Ahmed Ahmed, Aron Kader, Maz Jobrani, and Dean Obeidallah, as well as fellow actress and stand-up comedian Loni Love as Airport Security. The unrated DVD has a run time of 86 minutes and includes special features such as outtakes and behind-the-scenes footage. The DVD was also released in Sweden on 15 November 2008.

Review aggregation website Rotten Tomatoes gave the film a score of 83%, based on 490 reviews, averaging at 3.9/5. IMDb, another review aggregator that assigns a weighted mean rating, calculated an average score of 7.9/10, based on 397 reviews.

The special can be accessed through Amazon and Netflix.

== Media reports ==
- In March 2007, Time featured an interview report praising the group's activity as "warfare by humorous means."
- In June 2007, CNN reported that the group's video on YouTube has recorded over 200,000 views and that it enjoyed a special slot on Comedy Central in March of the same year.
- In February 2008, Syrian Forward praised the group's effort with an article entitled "Stand-up Diplomacy" and reported that three major Arab networks have vied for broadcast rights of their performance at the New York Arab-American Comedy Festival.
