= Summer Shesha =

Saudi Arabian actress and screenwriter

- سمر شِشّة
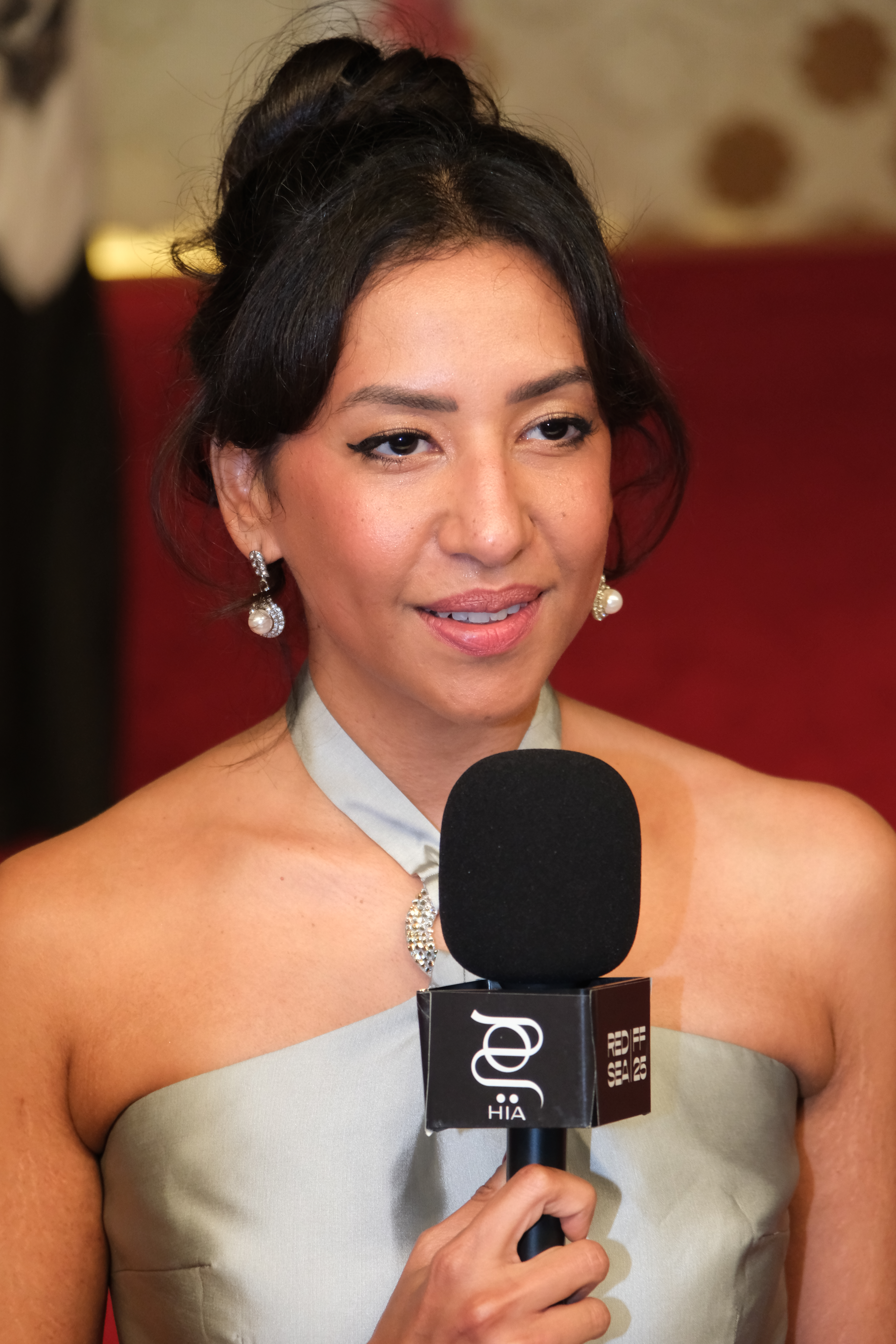
- Shesha at the 2025 Red Sea Film Festival
- Born: March 10; Jeddah, Saudi Arabia
- Occupations: Actress, screenwriter
- Parent: Amani Al Jameel (mother)

Summer Shesha is a Saudi actress and screenwriter. She starred in the 2023 Netflix series Crashing Eid.

== Biography ==
Shesha was born in Jeddah, Saudi Arabia. She made her acting debut in Mahmoud Sabbagh's 2013 web series Kash.

She won the Golden Palm Award for her role in the film Kayan at the 8th Saudi Film Festival in 2022.

Shesha, Ahmed Hatem, Marwan Hamed, Tara Emad, and Menna Shalabi were featured on the Vogue Arabia cover for April 2024.

== Personal life ==
Her mother, Amani Al Jameel, is also an actress, and played Shesha's mother in the series Crashing Eid.

== Filmography ==
=== Film ===
| Year(s) | Title | Role | Notes | Ref. |
|---|---|---|---|---|
| 2017 | Exit 5 | — | | |
| 2020 | The Book of the Sun | — | | |
| 2022 | Kayan | Thoraya | | |
| 2023 | Yesterday After Tomorrow | Past Sanaa | | |
| 2023 | To My Son | — | | |

=== Television ===
| Year(s) | Title | Role | Notes | Ref. |
|---|---|---|---|---|
| 2022 | Very Nice | — | | |
| 2023 | Crashing Eid | Razan | | |
