= Crashing Eid =

2023 Saudi Arabian TV series

- Genre: Comedy drama
- Created by: Nora Aboushousha
- Directed by: Ali Alattas; Samir Zaga
- Starring: Summer Shesha; Hamza Haq
- Music by: Suad Bushnaq
- Country of origin: Saudi Arabia
- Original language: Arabic
- No. of series: 1
- No. of episodes: 4

Production
- Running time: 45–48 minutes

Original release
- Release: 19 October 2023

Crashing Eid (Arabic: جايبة العيد) is a 2023 Saudi comedy drama television series created and written by Nora Aboushousha and Ali Alattas. The series stars Summer Shesha and Hamza Haq. It was distributed by Netflix and released on October 19, 2023.

Actresses Amani Al Jameel and Summer Shesha are related as mother and daughter, and play the same roles in the show.

== Cast ==
- Summer Shesha as Razan
- Hamza Haq as Sameer
- Bateel Nabeel as Lamar
- Yasir Alsaggaf as Sofyan
- Khalid Alharbi as Hasan
- Amani Al Jameel as Mona
- Amawri Ezayah as Mazen
