= Nadah El Shazly =

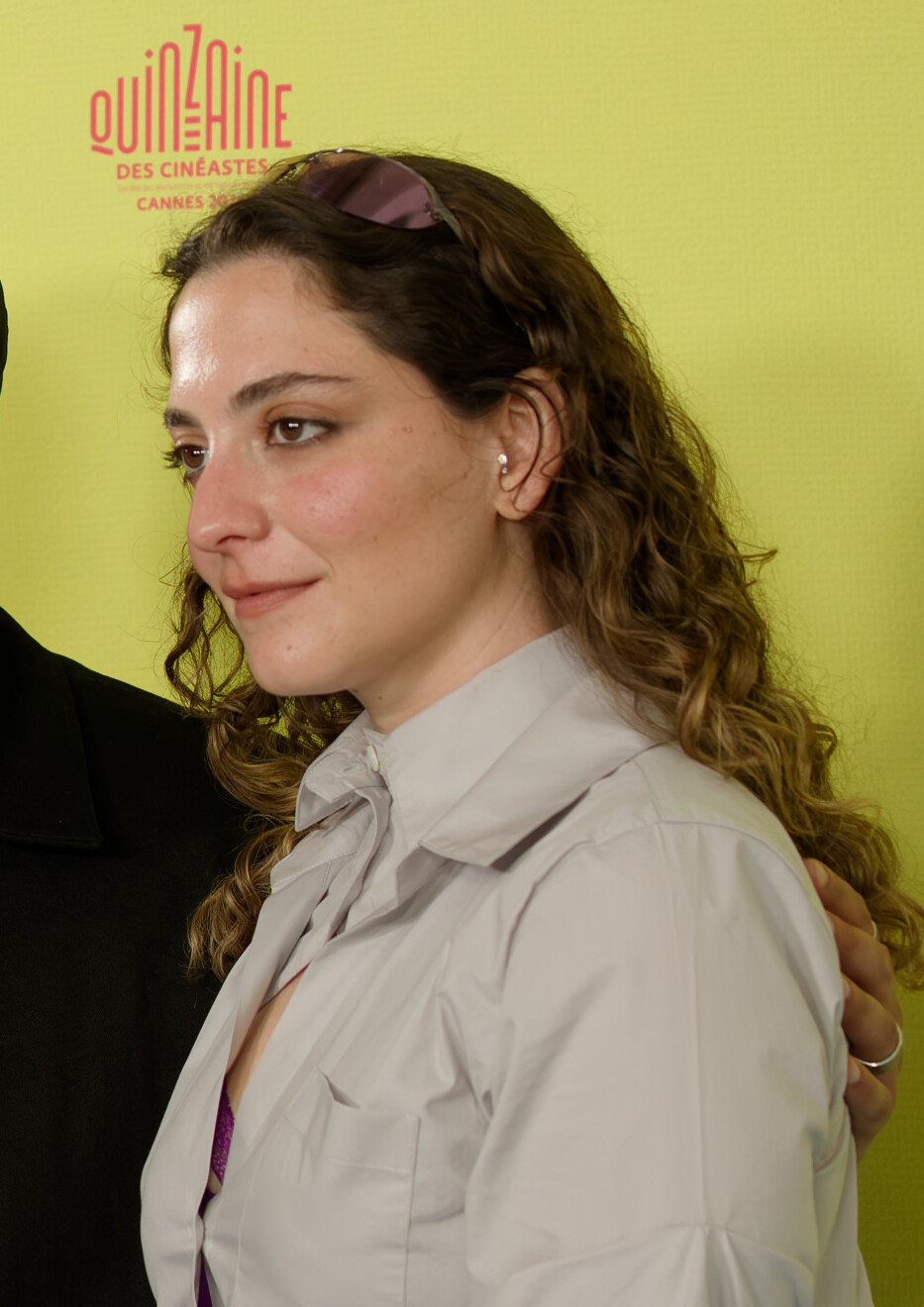
- Born: Cairo, Egypt
- Occupations: Singer, composer
- Years active: 2010s–present

Nadah El Shazly is an Egyptian-Canadian singer, originally from Cairo and currently based in Montreal. Her music blends traditional Egyptian music with experimental electronic music.

She released her debut album, Ahwar, in 2017. In 2023, she and artist Sister Sylvester collaborated on Constantinopoliad, an experimental sound art project based on the writing of Constantine P. Cavafy, which was also later released in an immersive virtual reality version in 2025.

In 2024 she and Elvin Brandhi released the collaborative album Pollution Opera.

Her second solo album, Laini Tani, was released in 2025, and was longlisted for the 2026 Polaris Music Prize.

She has also composed film scores, including The Damned Don't Cry, Last Party in R. Desert and To a Land Unknown.

== Discography ==
- Ahwar - 2017
- Pollution Opera - 2024
- Laini Tani - 2025
