= Last Party in R. Desert =

- Directed by: Mahmoud Sabbagh
- Written by: Mahmoud Sabbagh
- Produced by: Mahmoud Sabbagh, Ehab Sharief
- Starring: Abullah Albarrak; Marwa Salem; Sami Hanafy
- Cinematography: Victor Credi
- Edited by: Yassir Azmy
- Music by: Nadah El Shazly
- Production company: Elhoush Productions
- Distributed by: ART
- Release date: 9 May 2024
- Running time: 104 minutes
- Country: Saudi Arabia
- Language: Arabic
- Box office: SR 1,002,974 million

Last Party in R. Desert is a feature film by producer/director Mahmoud Sabbagh. The film premiered in Saudi Cinema on 9 May 2024.

== Synopsis ==
A cash-driven local impresario, Najm, wanders the nightlife junctures with his music troupe, in their struggle to stay afloat amid professional strife and a scene shift.

As the heir to Kaka Al-Qamar, one of Jeddah's most renowned wedding singers, he finds himself entangled in a drama of burnout and obsession that takes place over one long night filled with twists, turns, and disruptions.

== Reception ==
=== Box-office ===
It grossed SR 1,002,974 million, in its 3-weeks opening.
