= Ali Hassan (comedian) =

Canadian comedian

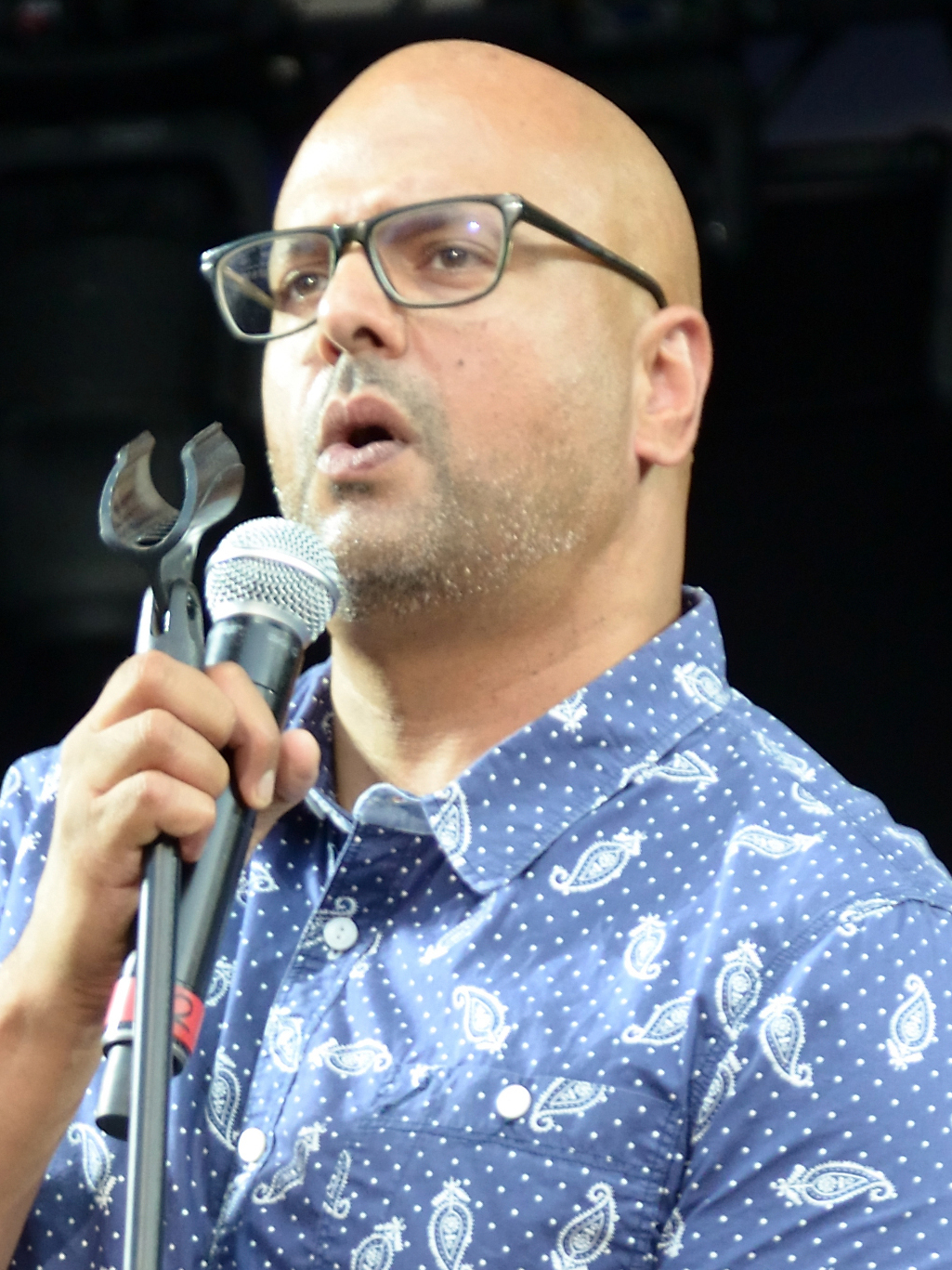
Hassan in 2022

Ali Hassan is a Canadian comedian and actor, known as the host of CBC Radio One's weekly comedy program Laugh Out Loud and as the moderator of CBC Radio's annual Canada Reads competition since 2017.

Born in Fredericton, New Brunswick, and raised in Montreal, Quebec, Hassan studied business administration at McMaster University before launching his comedy career. Initially he ran his own catering business with the goal of becoming a television cooking show host, and began performing as a comedian to build his confidence. After two years performing as a comedian in Montreal, he was invited to perform as an opening act for Russell Peters at the inaugural Amman Stand-up Comedy Festival in Amman, Jordan. During this time, he also had supporting roles in the films Breakaway, French Immersion and Goon.

After moving to Toronto, Ontario, in 2011, he began appearing regularly on George Stroumboulopoulos Tonight and continued performing as a touring comic. In 2013, he recorded his first comedy DVD, From Zero to Hero, in Montreal. In 2016, he performed his next one man show, Muslim, Interrupted, at the Just for Laughs Festival and the Edinburgh Festival Fringe.

In addition to his regular roles with CBC Radio, he is a frequent guest host of Q and The Next Chapter.

In 2024, he was nominated for two Canadian Screen Awards: Best Guest Performance, Comedy in the show Sort Of, and Best Supporting Performer, Comedy in the show Run the Burbs. In 2021, he received a Canadian Screen Award nomination for Best Host in a Web Program or Series at the 9th Canadian Screen Awards, as cohost with Peter Keleghan of the National Canadian Film Day livestream.

He has appeared in Star Trek: Strange New Worlds, and had recurring roles in Hudson & Rex, Designated Survivor, Sort Of, and the CBC Television sitcom Run the Burbs, and the web series You're My Hero and 18 to 35.
