= Telfaz11 =

Saudi Arabian entertainment company

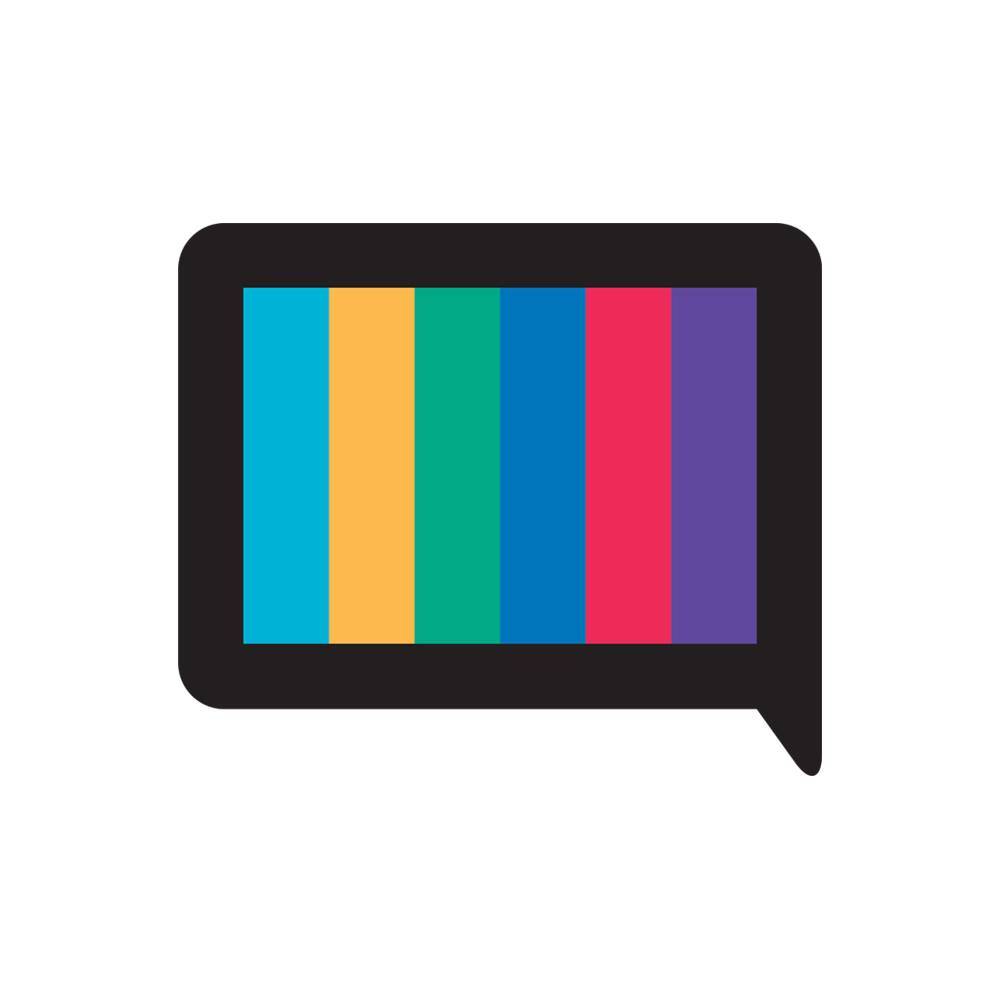
- Type: Private
- Industry: Entertainment
- Founded: 2011; 15 years ago
- Founder: Alaa Fadan; Ibraheem Alkhairallah; Ali Kalthami
- Headquarters: Riyadh, Saudi Arabia
- Divisions: Telfaz11 Studios
- Subsidiaries: Last Scene Films
- Website: telfaz11.com

Telfaz11 is a Saudi Arabian entertainment company based on Riyadh, Saudi Arabia. founded in 2011 by Alaa Fadan, Ibraheem Alkhairallah and Ali Kalthami.

== History ==
In 2020, the company signed a deal with Netflix to produce eight feature films.

In 2021, the studio acquired Last Scene Films.

== Filmography ==
=== Films ===
| Year | Title | Director | Distributor | Notes |
|---|---|---|---|---|
| 2022 | Sattar | Abdullah Alarak | Muvi Studios | Co-production with Alshimaisi Films |
| 2022 | Raven Song | Mohamed Alsalman | —N/a | |
| 2023 | Alkhallat+ | Fahad Alammari; Ayman Samman | Netflix | |
| 2023 | Naga | Meshal Aljaser | Netflix | Co-production with Movitaz Entertainment |
| 2023 | The Matchmaker | Abdulmohsen Aldhabaan | Netflix | |
| 2023 | Night Courier | Ali Kalthami | Front Row | Co-production with Muvi Studios |
| 2024 | Saify | Wael Abumansour | —N/a | |
| 2025 | Al Gaid | Hussam Alhulwah | —N/a | |
| 2025 | Alzarfa | Abdullah Majed | —N/a | Co-production with Alshimaisi Films |

=== Television and web ===
| Title | Year(s) | Network | Notes |
|---|---|---|---|
| Khambalah | 2012–2016 | YouTube | |
| Lutshps | 2012–2013 | YouTube | |
| Alkhallat+: The Series | 2026–present | Netflix | |
