= Aron Kader =

American comedian (born 1974)

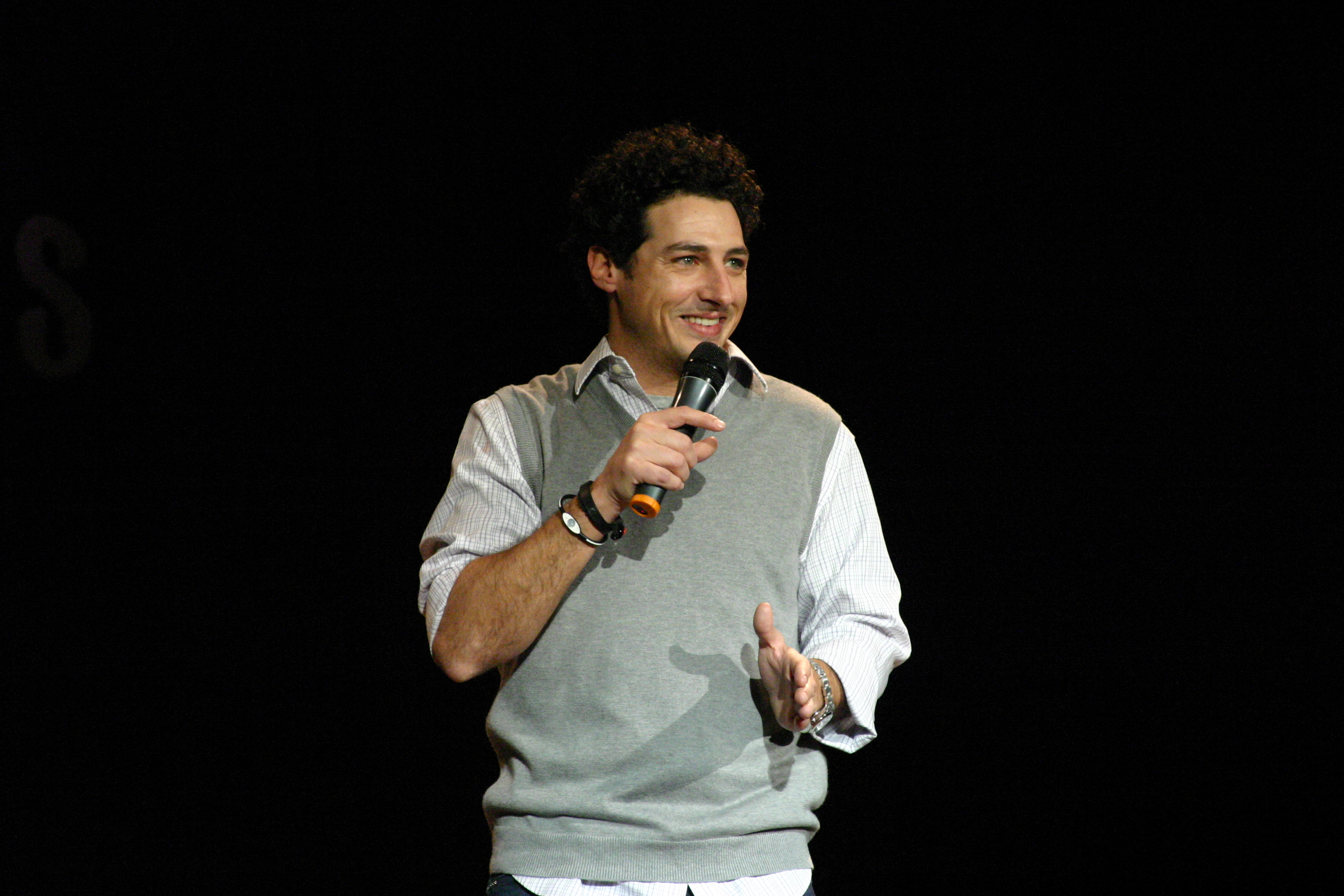
- Aron Kader, Standup Comedian
- Born: July 24, 1974 (age 52); Glendale, California, United States
- Notable work: Axis of Evil Comedy Tour

Comedy career
- Medium: Stand-up
- Genres: Observational comedy, Satire
- Subjects: Racism/Race relations, Islamophobia, Muslim-Americans, Religion, Politics, Arab culture

Aron Kader (born July 24, 1974) is an American comedian.

== Background ==
Kader was born to a Palestinian Muslim father and his Mormon mother. He spent his early years in Provo, Utah. His father, Omar Kader, was a professor of Political Science at Brigham Young University who went on to found a government contracting firm in Northern Virginia and his mother, Dr. Nancy Stowe Kader, a native of Ogden, Utah, is a bioethicist and management consultant with a nursing degree from BYU.

== Career ==
Kader is one of four members of the Axis of Evil Comedy Tour. He has performed in the New York Arab American Comedy Festival, started by fellow tour member Dean Obeidallah. Comedians from the Axis of Evil Comedy Tour such as Ahmed Ahmed were included on the DVD release of Michael Moore's film Fahrenheit 9/11. He also acted on the pilot Beverly Hills S.U.V. Aron can also be seen in the documentary, The Muslims are Coming!, which features a group of Muslim American comedians touring the United States in an effort to counter Islamophobia. The film also features various celebrities including Jon Stewart, David Cross, Janeane Garofalo, Rachel Maddow and many others. Kader has also been a member of the Sultans of Satire, a stand-up comedy show presented by the Levantine Cultural Center since 2005.

In February 2009, Kader organized the Comedy Cafe as part of Dubai Shopping Festival. Over a period of four weeks he offered workshops to aspiring Middle East comics and held headline shows each Saturday that brought together Axis of Evil comedians and other Arab, Middle Eastern, and Iranian comics.

In March 2012, Kader returned to Dubai to host a special comedy workshop to find two opening acts for his comedy show 'Aron Kader of Axis of Evil: Live in Dubai' on April 1.

Kader can be seen performing regularly at his hometown club, the Comedy Store in Los Angeles.
