= Ahmed Ahmed =

Egyptian-American actor and comedian

- أحمد أحمد
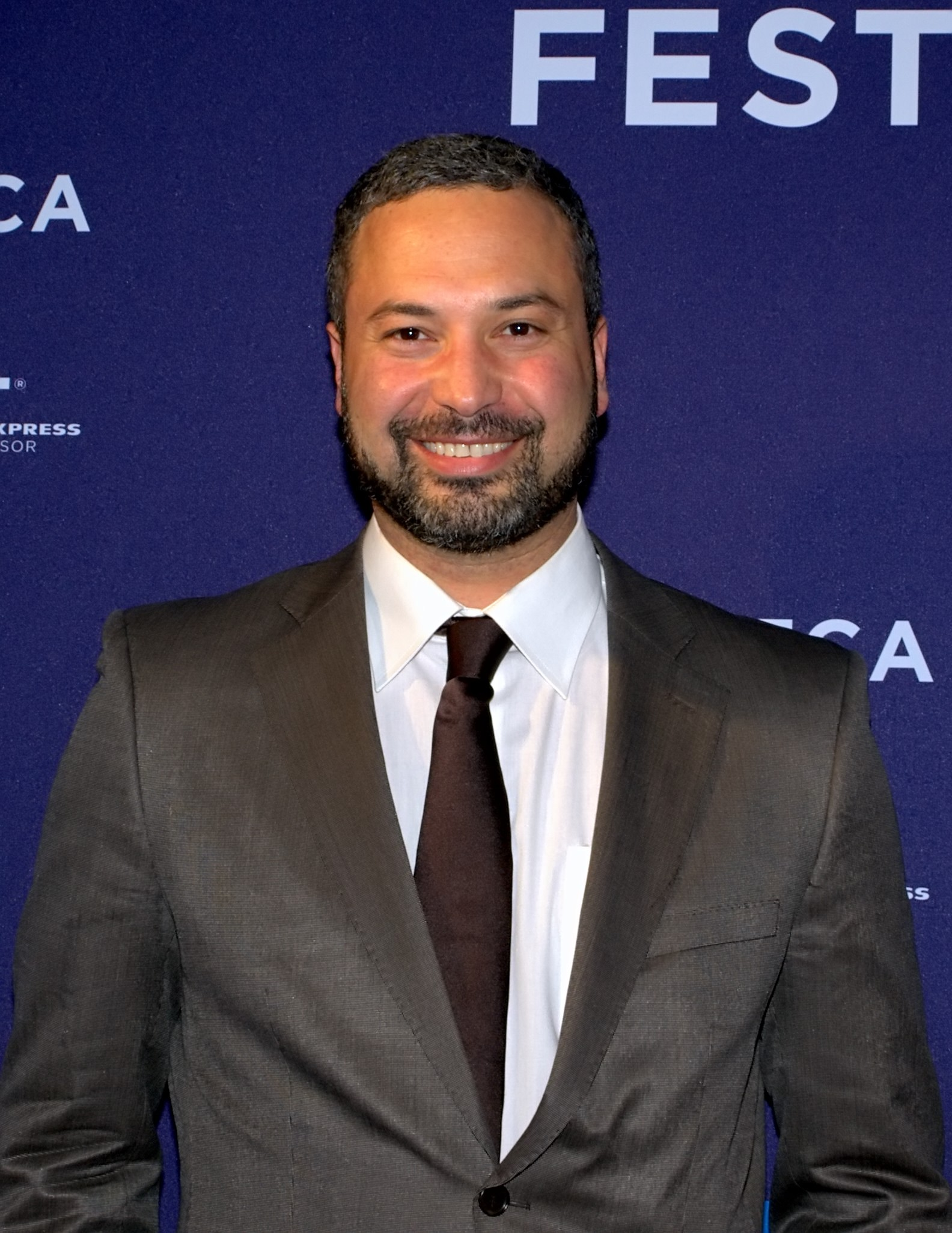
- Ahmed at the 2010 Tribeca Film Festival
- Born: Helwan, Egypt
- Occupations: Actor; comedian
- Years active: 1989–present

Comedy career
- Medium: Stand-up
- Genres: Observational comedy; satire
- Subjects: Racism/Race relations; Islamophobia; Muslim-Americans; Arab culture; Egyptian culture

Ahmed Ahmed (Arabic: أحمد أحمد, IPA: [ˈæħmæd ˈæħmæd]) is an Egyptian-American actor and comedian.

== Early life ==
Ahmed Ahmed was born in Helwan, Egypt. His family moved to the United States when he was one month old. He was raised in Riverside, California.

== Career ==
Ahmed Ahmed moved to Hollywood when he was 19 years old to pursue a career as an actor and stand-up comedian, and he has been working there ever since.

He has appeared in several films and television shows such as Executive Decision, Swingers, Tracey Takes On..., Roseanne, JAG, Tough Crowd with Colin Quinn on Comedy Central, and MTV's Punk'd with Ashton Kutcher. He would later joke about his part in Executive Decision in his standup routine for the Axis of Evil Comedy Tour. He has also appeared on CNN, The View, and National Public Radio, and was featured on the front page of The Wall Street Journal in December 2001, as well as in Newsweek. He was featured in the PBS television documentary America at a Crossroads series in "STAND UP: Muslim American Comics Come of Age", an episode about Muslim American comedians.

Ahmed Ahmed is a regular performer at The Comedy Store in Hollywood and tours all across the US and Europe. He was the winner of the first annual Richard Pryor Award for ethnic comedy at the Edinburgh Festival in Scotland in the summer of 2004. Ahmed was a member of the Axis of Evil Comedy Tour. He was also a notable guest for Axis of Justice which is a rock and heavy metal concert which fights for social justice.

He had a regular role in the TBS sitcom Sullivan & Son.

In 2019, Ahmed received media attention after an audience member called 911 in response to his stand-up set.

== Personal life ==
Ahmed says his role models include his parents, Muhammad Ali, Mitzi Shore, and friend Vince Vaughn.

Following 9/11, and through 2004, Ahmed Ahmed and the comedian Rabbi Bob Alper toured the United States with their avant-garde show "One Arab, One Jew, One Stage" about interfaith harmony and essential human dignity.

== Filmography ==
=== Film ===
Year	Title	Role	Notes
1995	Virtuosity	Camera man	
1996	Executive Decision	Terrorist #4	
1996	Swingers	Party Mystery Guy	
1996	Steel Sharks	Lt. Noussavi	
2005	All In	Amir	independent film
2005	Looking for Comedy in the Muslim World	Escort	
2006	Wild West Comedy Show: 30 Days and 30 Nights – Hollywood to the Heartland	Himself	Documentary about comedians
2007	Axis of Evil Comedy Tour	Himself	special DVD release
2008	The Onion Movie	Ahmed	
2008	Iron Man	Ahmed (aka Terrorist #4)	
2008	You Don't Mess with the Zohan	Waleed	
2008	Immigrants: L.A. Dolce Vita	Nazam	English version, voice actor
2008	The Legend of Awesomest Maximus	Slick Slave Trader	
2009	City of Life	Nasser	

=== Television ===
Year	Title	Role	Notes
1996	Roseanne	Hakeem	Episode: "Roseambo"
2001	Girlfriends	Fred	Episode: "Bad Timing"
2001	The View	Himself	2 episodes
2004	National Lampoon Live: The International Show	Himself	
2005	JAG	Jalal Sharif	Episode: "Bridging the Gulf"
2005	Last Call with Carson Daly	Himself	
2006	I Am Ahmed Ahmed	Himself	TV short documentary
2009	America at a Crossroads	Himself	Episode: "Stand Up: Muslim-American Comics Come of Age"
2010	Hey Hey it's Saturday	Himself	
2012–2014	Sullivan & Son	Ahmed Nassar	Series regular
