= Mahmoud Sabbagh =

Mahmoud Sabbagh محمود صباغ
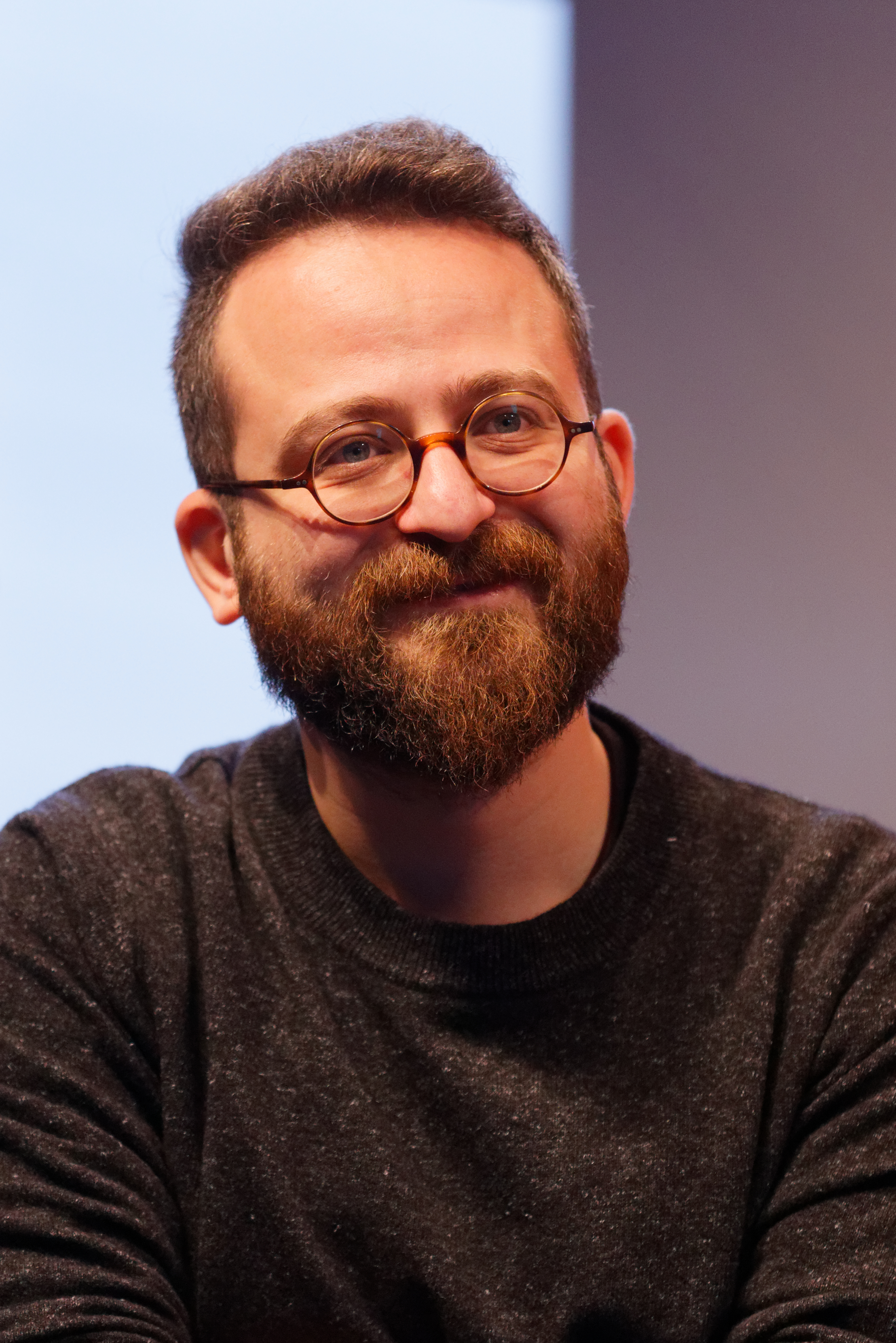
- Mahmoud Sabbagh at Berlinale 2017
- Born: 27 March 1983 (age 43); Jeddah, Saudi Arabia
- Education: Columbia University
- Occupations: film director, producer, screenwriter
- Years active: 2013–present
- Website: www.mahsabbagh.net

Mahmoud Sabbagh, or Mah Sabbagh (Arabic: مَحْمُود صباغ; born March 1983) is a Saudi film director, producer, and screenwriter. Sabbagh has been a major pioneer of independent cinema in Saudi Arabia since 2013. His debut feature, titled Barakah Meets Barakah, premiered at Berlin Film Festival in 2016; becoming the first feature film from Saudi Arabia to screen in the festival. His debut film was also selected as the entry of Saudi Arabia for the Best Foreign Language Film at the 89th Academy Awards.

In 2015, Sabbagh founded Elhoush Productions, the first independent feature film production company, based in Jeddah, Saudi Arabia.

Sabbagh opened the first official art house cinema in Jeddah in 2019. Cinema Elhoush opened with the screening of Stanley Kubrick's groundbreaking epic 2001: A Space Odyssey. It resumed its program in Winter 2022 at Alula, with a collection of recent and classic films Cinema Elhoush premiered a retrospective of Wong Kar-Wai screening five of his top films in 4k format for the first time in Saudi Arabia.

Sabbagh was named on the jury for the Best First Feature Award at the 67th Berlin International Film Festival.

Sabbagh is also known locally by the documentary The Story of Hamza Shehata (2013). Sabbagh also created/directed the provocative TV/web drama series Cash (2014); a 10-episodes drama series shot in cinema style. Sabbagh holds a master's degree of science from Columbia University Graduate School of Journalism where he studied storytelling filmmaking.

In October 2017, it was announced that Sabbagh is working on his second feature, titled: Amra and The Second Marriage. The film was shot entirely in Saudi Arabia and premiered in London BFI festival in 2018.

In March 2019, Sabbagh was announced the Festival Director of Saudi Arabia's first international film festival, The Red Sea Film Festival.

== Filmography ==
- Barakah Meets Barakah (2016). Prize of the Ecumenical Jury at Berlin Film Festival.
- Amra, and The Second Marriage (2018).
- Glitch Love (2022).
- Last Party in R. Desert (2023).
