= Abdullah Al-Eyaf =

Saudi Arabian film director

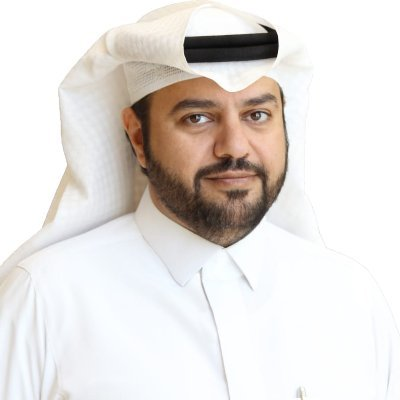
- Al-Eyaf, CEO of Saudi Film Commission
- Born: Abdullah Al-Eyaf Al-Qahtani; October 31, 1976 (age 50); Alhasa, Saudi Arabia
- Occupations: director, writer, producer
- Years active: 2005 – present

Abdullah Al-Eyaf (Arabic: عبدالله آل عياف; born October 31, 1976) is a Saudi Arabian film director also known as Abdullah Al Eyaf or Abdullah Aleyaf. He has directed many award-winning films. Since 2020, he has served as the Chief Executive Officer of the Saudi Film Commission.

== Early Life and Education ==
Abdullah Al Eyaf was born in Al Ahsa, Saudi Arabia, in 1976. He earned a bachelor’s degree in mechanical engineering from King Fahd University of Petroleum and Minerals in 2001. Prior to his appointment at the Saudi Film Commission, he worked across filmmaking, writing, and cultural programming.

== Filmmaking Career ==
Al Eyaf began making films in the mid-2000s, during a time when Saudi Arabia's cinema infrastructure was still in its early stages. His first major work, the documentary Cinema 500 km (2006), follows a young Saudi man traveling from Riyadh to Manama, Bahrain, to watch a film in a movie theatre - highlighting the absence of cinemas within the Kingdom at that time. The project required official permission from Saudi cultural authorities to proceed, and it premiered at the Emirates Film Competition in Abu Dhabi.

Al-Eyaf's second project was a 19-minute short film called Etaar ("A Frame"). His third short film he made was the 23-minute drama Matar ("Rain"), which was shown in many international film festivals around the world. He continued with the 23 minute short Matar (Rain, 2008), which received recognition in Saudi film competitions, and Aayesh (Alive, 2009/10), which won awards at regional festivals including the Gulf Film Festival and the Beirut International Film Festival.

Beyond directing, Al Eyaf participated as a jury member and panelist at film festivals such as the Gulf Film Festival and the Abu Dhabi Film Festival, contributing to discussions on cinema and cultural production in the region.

== Journalism and Writing ==
Alongside his filmmaking career, Al Eyaf contributed articles on cinema and media to Saudi newspapers such as Al Riyadh, Al Watan, and Asharq Al Awsat. He co-founded and edited a weekly cinema page and wrote a regular column focused on film-related topics and trends in cultural production.

His debut novel, A Hole to the Sky, was longlisted for the International Prize for Arabic Fiction in 2021.

== Saudi Film Commission ==
In June 2020, Al Eyaf was appointed Chief Executive Officer of the Saudi Film Commission by the Saudi Minister of Culture.

== Selected Work ==
- Cinema 500 km (2006) – Documentary chronicling a Saudi youth’s journey to Bahrain to watch a movie in a theatre; screened at the Emirates Film Competition.
- Matar (Rain) (2008) – Short film recognised in Saudi film competitions.
- Aayesh (Alive) (2009/10) – Short film awarded at the Gulf Film Festival and Beirut International Film Festival.

== Awards ==
- Golden Palm - Short Documentary: Cinema 500 km, in Saudi Film Competition 2008
- Saudi Arabia's winner of International Young Creative Entrepreneur in 2008.
- Silver Palm - Short Drama Matar (a.k.a. Rain), in Saudi Film Competition 2008
- Special Jury Prize - GCC Films: Etaar (a.k.a. A Frame), Emirates Film Competition 2007
- 1st Prize for Best Short Film - Official Competition: "Aayesh", Gulf Film Festival, 2010
- "Aleph" Second Best Short Film (SILVER): "Aayesh", Beirut International Film Festival 2010
- Best Screenplay: "Aayesh" Saudi Films Festival 2012.

== See also ==
- Cinema 500 km
