= Reem Abdullah =

Saudi Arabian actress (born 1987)

- Born: Norah Al Otaibi; February 20, 1987 (age 39); Riyadh, Saudi Arabia
- Occupation: Actress
- Years active: 2007–present

Norah Al Otaibi known as Reem Abdullah (Arabic: ريم عبد الله; born February 20, 1987) is a Saudi Arabian actress. She worked in the 2007 television series Tash Ma Tash with comedians Nasser Al Qasabi and Abdullah Al-Sadhan. In 2012, she was cast by the Saudi director Haifa Al-Mansour in the film Wadjda, which received critical acclaim.

== Works ==
=== TV series ===
- Tash ma tash (2007–2009)
- Beni w beni (2008–2009)
- klna ayal quraya (2008)
- Haitan w zaeab (2010)
- Homrai El-sahar 4 (2012)
- Alasouf (2018–2019)
- indma yktml alqamar pt1 (2019)
- indma yktml alqamar pt2 (2021)
- Marzouka (2022)
- Apple of Your Eye (2023)
- Al Sharar (TBA)
- jak el alm (2024-2026)

=== Movies ===
- Wadjda (2012)
