= Gigi Hozimah =

Saudi-American film director and writer

- Born: February 15, 1982 (age 44); Mecca, Saudi Arabia
- Education: Kingston University
- Occupations: Film director, writer, and producer
- Years active: 2009 - present
- Known for: Filmmaker

Gigi Hozimah (Arabic: جيجي حزيمة; born 15 February 1982 in Mecca, Saudi Arabia) is a Saudi film director and writer based in America. Her most notable features are He Belongs To Us and That Abandoned Place.

== Education ==
It was the dying wish of Gigi Hozimah's mother that she study abroad. Raised in a conservative Muslim household, Hozimah left Saudi Arabia in 2002 to pursue higher education in filmmaking in the United Kingdom, and did so without speaking a word of English. She graduated with a Bachelors in Television and Video Production from Southampton University in 2008, followed by a Masters in Filmmaking at Kingston University in 2010.

== Career ==
Starting out as an on-screen presenter for Al Alamia TV in London, England, Hozimah would eventually move to New York City to start her career in filmmaking. There, she founded her production company, Look At The Wall Productions, in 2013.

Hozimah's feature debut He Belongs To Us (2017), is a psychological horror film shot on location in New York City. He Belongs to Us was selected in several film festivals, including Newfilmmakers NY Festival in 2018, and screened at several independent cinemas. In August, 2021, Hozimah was named an "Inspirational Woman in Hollywood" by Authority Magazine.

In 2022, for the first time in over 20 years, Hozimah returned to her home country Saudi Arabia as an honored guest of the 8th Annual Saudi Film Festival in Dammam, Saudi Arabia. Her second feature, That Abandoned Place (2021) was awarded Best Sound Design at the Saudi Film Festival the following year.

That Abandoned Place was written and directed by Hozimah, and filmed on-location in New York City and Philadelphia.

== Films ==
- Happy Birthday, 2009 (short)
- Window, 2009 (short)
- Little Adult, 2009 (short)
- Blue Sweater, 2010 (short)
- Chess Player (short documentary)
- He Belongs to Us, 2018 (feature)
- That Abandoned Place, 2021 (feature)
