= Barakah Meets Barakah =

- Directed by: Mahmoud Sabbagh
- Written by: Mahmoud Sabbagh
- Produced by: Mahmoud Sabbagh
- Starring: Hisham Fageeh; Fatima Al-Banawi
- Cinematography: Victor Credi
- Edited by: Sofia Subercaseaux
- Music by: Zeid Hamdan; Maii Waleed
- Distributed by: Rotana Studios; Arsenal (Germany); trigon-film (Switzerland)
- Release date: February 2016 (Berlin)
- Running time: 88 minutes
- Country: Saudi Arabia
- Language: Arabic

Barakah Meets Barakah (Arabic: بركة يقابل بركة Hejazi pronunciation: [baraka jiˈgaːbɪl baraka]) is a 2016 Saudi Arabian drama-comedy film directed and written by Mahmoud Sabbagh, a remarkably candid Saudi Arabian love story which uses humor as a counterweight to the difficulties the couple face. Principal photography of Barakah Meets Barakah began on 25 September 2015 and ended on 22 October, and was shot entirely in Jeddah, Saudi Arabia. The film was selected as the Saudi Arabian entry for the Best Foreign Language Film at the 89th Academy Awards (the second time the country made a submission for the Oscars).

== Plot summary ==
A guy from the middle class meets a girl from a wealthy family, and they start a romance in a country that frowns upon it. Barakah (Hisham Fageeh) is a good-natured civil servant who rides around Jeddah issuing tickets for minor offences. Bibi (Fatima Al-Banawi) is using carefully cropped Instagram videos to amass millions of likes for her fashion-forward, eco-friendly and just-shy-of-revolutionary female empowerment messages. Barakah stumbles across one of her shoots and is stricken. The two hit it off, but finding an appropriate location to meet face-to-face and share even a moment together proves challenging due to Saudi Arabia’s strict public policies. Things turn political when Barakah begins comparing today’s Saudi culture with that of his uncle’s generation. Looking at old slides, he recounts how men and women used to be able to socialise in public, there were cultural heroes besides imams.

== Premieres and screenings ==
The film premiered at the Forum section of the 66th Berlin International Film Festival making it the first Saudi feature film to premiere at the festival. It won the Prize of the Ecumenical Jury at the Berlinale. It was selected to represent the Berlinale during the Berlinale Spotlight program at the 14th Morelia International Film Festival in Mexico in October 2016.

The film premiered in North America at the Elgin and Winter Garden Theatres on September 16 at the 41st annual Toronto International Film Festival, receiving a standing ovation. Cameron Bailey, the artistic director at TIFF, called it: a "freewheeling, engaging romantic romp [that] has real weight even though its humorous touch is as light as air". It was later selected as the Saudi Arabian entry for the Best Foreign Language Film at the 89th Academy Awards but it was not nominated.

The film was also selected at the 38th Cairo International Film Festival becoming the first Saudi film ever to participate in the festival, receiving a certificate of appreciation.

The film was theatrically released in many countries, including Germany, Switzerland, Austria, UAE, Egypt and Tunisia. It was released in Germany through Arsenal in 20 cinemas across Germany on March 9, 2017.

Netflix brought the international VoD distribution rights to the film. It premiered on all Netflix regions (except MENA) on October 12, 2017, making it the first Saudi film to display on the streaming service.

== Critical response ==
Barakah Meets Barakah premiered at the Berlinale to positive reviews.

Neil Young of The Hollywood Reporter, called it on his Berlin Review, "Easygoing charmer conceals some sharp political barbs.". David D'Arcy of Screen Daily, stated, "Rather than break down barriers and throw bombs at taboos, Barakah Meets Barakah chooses a humor of clever restraint, rare for any first feature."

The film continued to garner positive reviews during Toronto Film Festival.

Alexander Huls of RogerEbert.com, stated, "The film offers the breezy gentleness, good-naturedness and charm the best of the genre offers." He said, "It gives us an authentic rom-com experience that’s still about something—without ever sacrificing what draws us to the genre in the first place. It is both charming and meaningful. In that Sabbagh’s film reminded me of a lesson I relearn every year at the Toronto International Film Festival: there are beautiful cinematic wonders to be found if you take the time to venture outside the buzzed-about Hollywood movies."

The Guardian critic Jordan Hoffman, gave it 3/5 stars.

== See also ==
- Lists of Egyptian films
- List of submissions to the 89th Academy Awards for Best Foreign Language Film
- List of Saudi Arabian submissions for the Academy Award for Best Foreign Language Film
