= Wonho Chung =

South Korean comedian (born 1980)

Chung Won-hu
- 정원호
- Born: Chung Won-hu; October 22, 1980 (age 45); Jeddah, Saudi Arabia
- Citizenship: South Korea; Jordan; Vietnam; France
- Education: Applied Science Private University
- Occupations: Stand-Up comedian TV Presenter; Host; Actor
- Years active: 2007–present

Chung Wonho (Arabic: تشونغ ونهو, Korean: 정원호; born October 22, 1980) is a South Korean comedian and television personality, born in Jeddah, Saudi Arabia, and raised in Amman, Jordan, to a South Korean father and Vietnamese mother. Although raised in an East/Southeast Asian household, Wonho was given an Arab upbringing, acquiring proficiency in five languages, including native Arabic and fluent English.

He graduated from Jordan's Applied Science Private University in 2004. He currently lives and works in Dubai, UAE.

== Information ==
Chung's comedy career began in 2007 when he toured with the Axis of Evil comedy tour.

Chung covered the red carpet at the Dubai International Film Festival in 2008 where he interviewed the likes of Goldie Hawn and Danny Glover and in 2009 as well where he interviewed Indian film actor Amitabh Bachchan and numerous Arabic celebrities. In December 2010, Chung hosted the award ceremony and closing gala of the Dubai International Film Festival

In 2009, Chung covered the red carpet at the inaugural Doha Tribeca Film Festival in Qatar where he interviewed actors; Sir Ben Kingsley, Jeffrey Wright, Patricia Clarkson, Alexander Siddig and film director Mira Nair.

In April 2010, the Korea Tourism Organization appointed Wonho Chung as a Goodwill Ambassador for tourism Korea.

Wonho hosted the Middle East Gala ceremony for the World Travel Awards in 2010 and in 2011.

Chung hosted a show titled "Inside Asia" as part of the AFC Asian Cup coverage on Al-Kass Sports Channel which took place in the hosting nation, Qatar.

Chung also served as a judge on Sama Dubai TV's reality show "Al Fursa" in 2010-2011 which was an open platform talent show for various talents from different nationalities.

In June 2011, Chung went to South Korea to film a mini documentary titled Shouf Korea (see "visit" Korea) which was a joint collaboration between the Korean Tourism Organization and Dubai based channel Al Aan TV to be broadcast on the latter.

In 2014, Chung appeared on the popular Egyptian show El Bernameg ("The Program") hosted by the satirist Bassem Youssef.

Starting in 2015 and continuing into 2016, Wonho hosted the Arabic travel program "Wonho Around the World" on Al Araby TV, visiting his parents' homelands of South Korea and Vietnam, as well as Tokyo, Japan, Hong Kong and Macau, Shanghai and Beijing, China, Dubai, London, and Switzerland among others.
