= Fayez Al-Malki =

- فايز المالكي
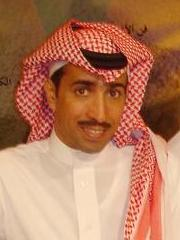
- Born: September 12, 1969 (age 57); Ta'if, Saudi Arabia
- Other name: Menahi
- Occupations: actor, comedian
- Years active: 1985– present

Fayez Al-Malki (Arabic: فايز المالكي; born September 12, 1969) is a Saudi Arabian television actor and humanitarian. He is best known as Menahi, a character he portrayed in several works such as Menahi's diary (2006) and Menahi (2009).

== Background ==
Al-Malki was born in Haddad Bani Malik, Ta'if. His brother is Ali Al-Malki, is an Islamic preacher. Al-Malki began his career in theater in 1985, where he portrayed a comic character known at the time as Abu Rannah. He made his television debut in the first season of the Saudi Arabian comedy, Tash ma Tash (No Big Deal) in 1993.

In 2009, he was featured in the list of Arabian Business 100 Inspiring leaders in the Middle East and honored at the King Fahd Cultural Center in Riyadh.

On August 31, 2009, he was chosen as a Goodwill ambassador for UNICEF in the Persian Gulf region. Al-Malki resigned from the position in 2012 because of their stance regarding the Syrian crisis.

In 2015, Mohammed bin Rashid Al Maktoum awarded AL-Malki the Arab Social Media Influencers Award in Community Service category at the Arab Social Media Influencers Summit held in Dubai World Trade Centre.

In 2017, he was awarded the New Media Award represented by the Saudi Ministry of Media.

Al-Malki has hosted several talk shows such as Tonight with Fayez which premiered on Dubai TV in 2012 and Host in our house premiered in 2016.

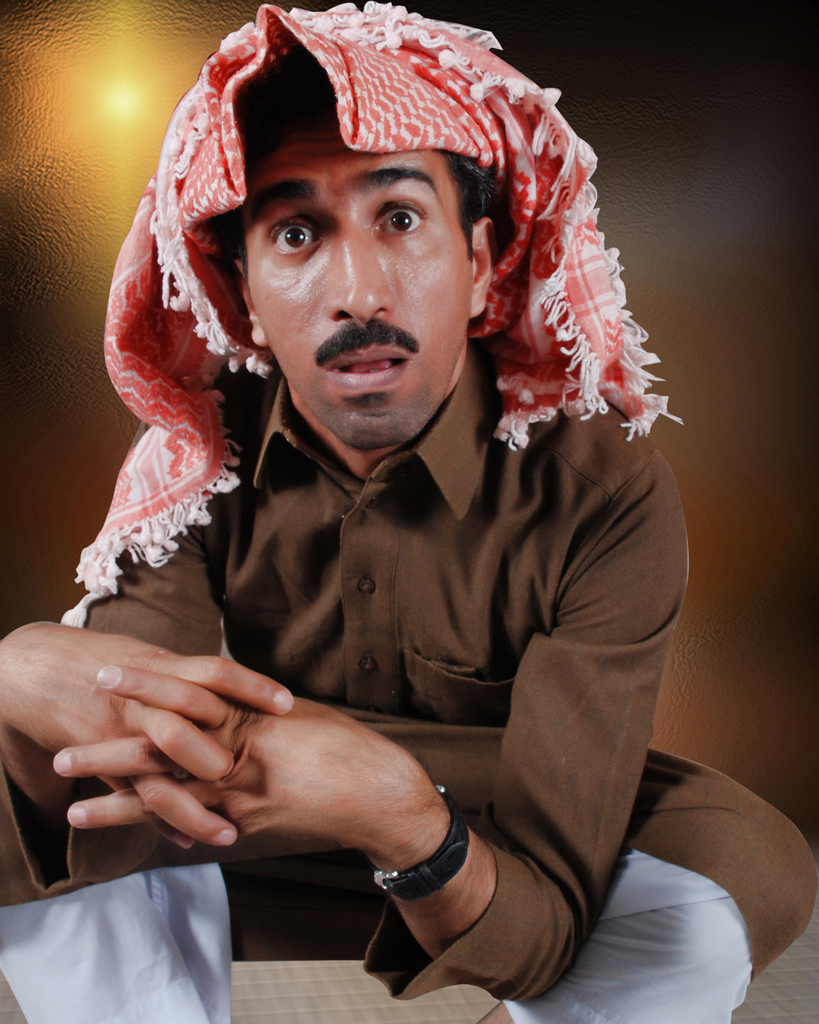
Al-Malki in Rabah and the Doctor, 2008

== Filmography ==
=== Television ===
Year	Title	Notes
1993	Tash ma Tash	Season 1, 3, 6
1997	El Wahm	
1998	Abu Ruwaishid family	
1999	Globalization	
2000	Al Dera Net	
2002	Oud	
2002	Count and go wrong	
2002	Nourah	
2002	Stay with Me	Season 7
2002	Some Salt	
2003	Rejected Images	
2003	Wafaa	
2003	Trail of Love	
2004	Umm Rakan map	
2005	My Brothers and Sisters	
2005	Last Sunset	
2006	Menahi's diary	Animation
2006	Abu Shalaakh Alburmayi	
2007	Between Me and You	Season 1, 2, 3
2008	Rabah and the Doctor	
2009	Rabeh's Dreams	
2010	Soktom Buktom	Season 2, 3, 4
2012	Shabab El-Bomb	
2014	Khamis bin Juma	
2018	Share Chat	
2019	Quick Quick	
2021	Curfew	

=== Film ===
Year	Title
2005	Haneen
2009	Menahi
2021	Not Me

=== Theater ===
Year	Title
2007	Menahi and the Millions
2008	Rabeh the Loser
