= Night Courier =

- Theatrical release poster
- Directed by: Ali Kalthami
- Written by: Ali Kalthami; Mohammed Algarawi
- Produced by: Abdulrahman Jerash; Chawki Knis
- Starring: Mohamad Aldokhei
- Cinematography: Ahmed Tahoun
- Edited by: Fakhreddine Amri
- Production companies: Telfaz11; Muvi Studios
- Distributed by: Front Row (Saudi Arabia); MPM Premium (International)
- Release dates: September 8, 2023 (TIFF); December 14, 2023 (Saudi Arabia)
- Running time: 110 minutes
- Country: Saudi Arabia
- Language: Arabic
- Box office: $7.5 million

Night Courier, also known as Mandoob, (Arabic: مندوب الليل) is a 2023 Saudi Arabian black comedy crime thriller film co-written and directed by Ali Kalthami in his directorial debut. The film stars Mohamad Aldokhei as a poor, mentally fragile man who sells alcohol at night to pay for his sick father's treatment. It had its world premiere at the 48th Toronto International Film Festival on 8 September 2023 as part of the Discovery section.

== Synopsis ==
Fahad is a 30-year-old man from a lower social class who lives his life under constant pressure due to his job as a customer service worker in a telecommunications company and because he must obtain money to pay for the treatment of his sick father and help his divorced sister. His situation worsens when he is fired, so he decides to work as a delivery man to save money by entering the nightlife and the business of stealing and selling alcoholic beverages.

== Cast ==
- Mohamad Aldokhei as Fahad
- Mohammed Altawyan as Nasser
- Hajar Alshammari as Sara
- Sarah Taibah as Maha
- Abdullah Ahmad as Alaa
- Mohammed Algarawi as Abu Saud
- Layla Malik as Suha
- Morouj as Sawsan
- Abo Salu as Sultan

== Production ==
Principal photography took place at the end of 2022, lasting 55 days in Riyadh, Saudi Arabia.

== Release ==
It had its world premiere on September 8, 2023, at the 48th Toronto International Film Festival, then screened on September 29, 2023, at the 19th Zurich Film Festival, on November 29, 2023, at the 41st Torino Film Festival, on January 8, 2024, at the 35th Palm Springs International Film Festival, and on April 24, 2024, at the Malmö Arab Film Festival. It was commercially released on December 14, 2023, in Saudi Arabian theaters, then it was released on January 11, 2024, in the rest of the theaters in the Arab region. International distribution rights were sold to MPM Premium.

== Reception ==
=== Box-office ===
In its first weekend in Saudi theaters, the film sold 114,000 tickets grossing $1.58 million, surpassing Wonka and The Boy and the Heron, becoming the highest opening for a Saudi production. By the end of February 2024, it attracted 605,000 viewers grossing $7.5 million. It also had a gross of $6,085 in the United Arab Emirates and $14,427 in the United Kingdom.

=== Accolades ===
Year	Award / Festival	Category	Recipient	Result	Ref.
2023	19th Zurich Film Festival	Golden Eye	Night Courier	Nominated	
2023	41st Torino Film Festival	Valdata Award - Best Feature Film	Night Courier	Won	
2024	24th Arab Film Festival Rotterdam	Best Actor	Mohamad Aldokhei	Won	
2024	Ho Chi Minh City International Film Festival	Best New Director	Ali Kalthami	Won	
