= David D'Arcy =

Australian cricketer

Personal information
- Full name: David D'Arcy
- Source: ESPNcricinfo, 26 December 2016

David D'Arcy was an Australian cricketer. He played one first-class match for New South Wales in 1862/63, scoring 17 and 34 not out, the highest scorer on either side in New South Wales' victory over Victoria. Described as one of the "colts" of the team, he excelled "by cautious play and excellent hitting, by never giving a chance, and never missing one". A year later he played in three matches for a New South Wales XXII against the touring English team, top-scoring for New South Wales in the third match with 16 in the second innings.

== See also ==
- List of New South Wales representative cricketers
