= The Peninsula Times =

The Peninsula Times began publication on 23 August 1994. It was a free English language tabloid newspaper distributed to 200,000 households in the Western Cape, started by entrepreneur Marthinus Strydom. During September 2004, Naspers acquired 70% of the newspaper for an undisclosed amount.

Two editions were available: one for the southern and one for the northern parts of Cape Town. Marthinus Strydom, founder and director of the paper, said that the paper was not out to make a war against the existing dailies in Cape Town. The idea of a new, encompassing tabloid in the Cape was born in 1993 when Strydom was the director of the Northern Times. He approached Naspers at the beginning of 1993, and a deal was made. The newspaper had 32 freelance staff members and 5 full-time journalists. The tabloid featured in-depth investigative reporting, news analysis, and human interest stories.

In 1995, Nasionale Pers acquired the remainder of the shareholding and integrated the newspaper into its other regional free-sheet newspapers.
