= Hind Mohammed =

Saudi Arabian actress (born 1981)

- Born: Hind Mohammed Alharbi; 22 April 1981 (age 45); Riyadh, Saudi Arabia
- Occupation: Actress
- Years active: 2006-present

Hind Mohammed (Arabic: هند محمد) is a Saudi Arabian actress. She co-starred in Rotana's comedy-drama film Keif al-Hal?, the country's first big-budget film, produced by Ayman Halawani.

== Career ==
Ayman Halawani told the BBC in May 2006 that the film is potentially significant in charting the developing role of women in Saudi Arabia:

"Hind was brave in taking on the role of Dunya. She’s shown that a Saudi actress can both be attractive and dignified."

The part involved Hind playing a woman who was struggling with her particularly conservative family, a topical issue both within and outside of the Arab world.
