= Shams Al-Ma'arif (film) =

2020 film by Faris Godus

The Book of the Sun
- Arabic: شمس المعارف
- Directed by: Faris Godus
- Release date: 2020
- Country: Saudi Arabia

The Book of the Sun (Shams Al-Ma'arif) is a 2020 Saudi comedy film directed by Faris Godus. It premiered on July 22, 2020, in Jeddah, then in Riyadh. It was widely released in Saudi Arabia on July 31, 2020. The film was supposed to premiere in the Red Sea International Film Festival but it got delayed due to the Coronavirus pandemic.

Shams Al-Ma'arif tells the story of a group of Saudi teens and how the internet and content making changed their lives. It gives an insider's look at the origins of Saudi content making from the nineties to the current times. The story also has a personal nature as the Godus brothers started making content on YouTube before their debut.

== Plot ==
In 2010, a student called Husam is about to graduate high school but he becomes obsessed with making content at the peak of Saudi YouTube content. That leads him to an adventure to explore his passion. He is making a low-budget horror movie during his senior year with the help of his best friend Maan, his rival Ibrahim, and their physics teacher Orabi.

== Cast ==
- Suhaib Godus
- Baraa Alem
- Ismail Alhassan
- Ahmed Saddam
- Summer Shesha
- Eyad Ayman Kaifi
- Nawaf Alshubaili

== Name ==
Shams Al-Ma'arif refers to the infamous book Shams al-Ma'arif wa Lata'if al-'Awarif, a 13th century magic and spirituality manual. It has been banned in most islamic countries and its name became synonymous with the occult.

== Reception ==
The movie has been well received in the Arab cinema community. The Red Sea Film Festival Director Mahmoud Sabbagh said: "The Godus brothers have created a testament to the passionate community of pioneering filmmakers, who have inspired and drive Saudi cinema culture." Arab News praised the movie and its message saying: "The film perfectly encapsulates the complex feelings of an entire generation of Saudi youth, who struggled before the current era to imagine a future when creative professions could ever be taken seriously." KAWA regarded it as "A personal and universal film at the same time".
