= Keif al-Hal? =

Keif al-Hal?; كيف الحال؟
- Directed by: Izidore Musallam
- Produced by: Ayman Halawani
- Starring: Hisham Abdulrahman; Hind Mohammed; Meshaal al-Mutairi; Turki Al Yousef
- Music by: George Fenton
- Distributed by: Rotana
- Release date: 9 November 2006
- Running time: 95 minutes
- Country: Saudi Arabia
- Language: Arabic

Keif al-Hal? (Arabic: كيف الحال؟) (How are You?) is Saudi Arabia's first big-budget film, produced by Ayman Halawani (of Prince Al-Walid bin Talal's Rotana Group). Directed by Izidore Musallam, it stars Hind Mohammed, the first Saudi cinema actress.

== Plot ==
The film is a comedy-drama that recounts the story of a family torn between modernity and tradition in Saudi Arabia.

== Production ==
The film, shot in Dubai, United Arab Emirates is financed by Rotana Group, a company owned by Saudi billionaire Prince Alwaleed bin Talal.

== Release and reception ==
Saudi audiences were able to see the film on pay-per-view through an agreement with Showtime Arabia. The movie was shown at 17 festivals worldwide.
