= Saify =

2024 film by Wael Abumansour

- Theatrical release poster
- Directed by: Wael Abumansour
- Written by: Wael Abumansour
- Produced by: Mohammed Alhamoud; Almotaz Aljefri; Chawki Knis
- Starring: Baraa Alem; Husam AlHarthi; Nour Alkhadra; Osama Alqess; Aixa Kay
- Cinematography: Sashank Sana
- Edited by: Seifallah Ben Othman
- Music by: Fabien Kourtzer; Mike Kourtzer
- Production company: Telfaz11
- Release date: 2024
- Running time: 98 minutes
- Country: Saudi Arabia

Saify is a 2024 Saudi Arabian film written and directed by Wael Abumansour. It ran as the only Saudi feature film in competition at the Red Sea International Film Festival.

== Synopsis ==
The film follows a forty-year-old con artist named Saify Muhammed. Struggling with debt to his ex-wife, he attempts blackmail.

== Production ==
In September 2024, Telfaz11 announced that it would be producing Saify, with Wael Abumansour writing and directing, and a release date for later in the year.

== Critical reception ==
The Reviews Hub lamented that the film "confuses and frustrates rather than satisfies" and that its plot "is full of holes."

Dirty Movies found that "The plot of Saify is barely comprehensible for non-Arabs such as I (a frustration shared with another Western journalist with whom I watched the movie). The lack of cultural knowledge seriously compromises the viewing experience."
