= ET bel Arabi =

Arabic TV news show

- Arabic: إي تي بالعربي
- Based on: Entertainment Tonight by Al Masini
- Original language: Arabic
- No. of seasons: 3

Production
- Production companies: CBS Studios International; Charisma Group; Say N'C Productions; MBC Group

Original release
- Network: MBC1
- Release: 4 January 2015 – 2017 / January 2019 - present (online version)

ET bel Arabi (Arabic: إي تي بالعربي) is an Arabic-language entertainment news show based on the format of the American newsmagazine Entertainment Tonight. It is jointly produced by Say N'C Productions and MBC Group

In 2019, ET بالعربي was launched online where viewers can now watch it online and follow its social media platforms.

The show is hosted by Mariam Saïd (مريم سعيد), Badr Al Zaidan (بدر آل زيدان), Nadrin Faraj (بدر آل زيدان).
