= Bob Alper =

American author and actor

Robert "Bob" Alper is an American author and stand-up comedian known for Jewish-themed humor.

He has appeared at the Montreal Comedy Festival and at The Hollywood Improv. He often performs with Arab and Muslim comedy partners, primarily at colleges and universities. He has been seen on Good Morning America, Showtime, the BBC, CNN, and was featured on Extra.

Alper is the author of three books: Thanks. I Needed That., Life Doesn't Get Any Better Than This: The Holiness of Little Daily Dramas, an inspirational collection; as well as the cartoon book, A Rabbi Confesses. He has produced two comedy CDs.
