= Menahi =

- Directed by: Ayman Makram
- Written by: Mazin Taha
- Produced by: Aiman Al Ziyoud
- Starring: Fayez Al-Malki; Muna Wasef; Abdullah Al-Eman; Dana Faraj Al-Ish
- Music by: Nasser Al-Saleh
- Release date: 2009
- Running time: 140 minutes
- Country: Saudi Arabia
- Language: Arabic

Menahi (Arabic: مناحي) is a Saudi Arabian comedy film released in 2008, directed by Ayman Makram and written by Mazin Taha. The film features Syrian actress Mouna Wasef, Fayez al-Malki in the lead role, and Dana Faraj Al-Ish as the co-star. The music for the film was composed by Saudi composer Nasser Al-Saleh.

== Plot ==
The film is about a Bedouin villager named "Menahi" who gets rich and decides to move to a big city.

== Further details ==
The 2009 opening of Menahi was the first time films were screened in Riyadh for several decades. Men and girls under 12 were permitted to go to the screening.
