= Cinema 500 km =

- Directed by: Abdullah Al-Eyaf
- Written by: Abdullah Al-Eyaf
- Produced by: Abdullah Al-Eyaf
- Starring: Tariq Al-Husaini
- Cinematography: Abdullah Al-Eyaf
- Edited by: Abdullah Al-Eyaf; Hosam Al-Banna
- Release date: 2006
- Running time: 42 minutes
- Country: Saudi Arabia
- Language: Arabic

Cinema 500 km (Arabic: السينما 500 كم) is a 2006 Saudi Arabian documentary film and was directed by Abdullah Al-Eyaf. The film depicts the experiences of Tariq Al-Husaini, a 21-year-old Saudi movie fan despite no cinemas and are available only on home video in Saudi Arabia. Al-Husaini is shown applying for a passport and traveling 500 kilometers to Bahrain to see a movie in a cinema for the first time.

== Production ==
Abdullah Al-Eyaf secured permission from the Saudi Ministry of Culture and Information to shoot this documentary. The project followed Saudi film enthusiast Tariq Al-Husaini as he traveled from Saudi Arabia to Bahrain to experience a commercial cinema screening, reflecting the absence of movie theaters in Saudi Arabia at the time.

The film premiered at the Emirates Film Competition in Abu Dhabi, United Arab Emirates in 2006. Due to the lack of cinemas in Saudi Arabia there were no scheduled plans to screen the film in its home country.

== See also ==
- Abdullah Al-Eyaf
