= Meshal Aljaser =

Saudi Arabian filmmaker

Meshal Aljaser is a Saudi Arabian filmmaker, most notable for fast cutting, and topics that address the clash of Saudi culture, and musings on religious belief and the afterlife. His made a mini-series Folaim Ya Gholaim, and a short film Arabian Alien which premiered in the Sundance Film Festival in 2019. His short film Is Sumyati Going to Hell? tackles issues of religion, culture, and injustice towards maids in Saudi Arabia. It is told from the eyes of a young protagonist who questions her family's beliefs. It is featured as part of Netflix's six windows in the desert. He has often tried to push the cultural boundaries through provocative videos, such as when he features a Saudi man licking an American woman's face on his music video "Fadayeh" [scandals].

Aljaser's style is often satirical, experimental and fast-paced. He has won numerous awards such as Ahmad Al Shugairi's program Qomrah 2, for creating the film "Under Concrete" addressing the issues of Refugees of the Syrian civil war and homelessness.

His film Arabian Alien is considered a genre of science fiction, and addresses the marriage between a couple where the man discovers that he is an alien. It features Saudi comedian Abu Hamdan, and the music of Saudi-American R&B musician Tamtam. It premiered at Sundance Film Festival, won best short film at Atlanta Film Festival, making it eligible for best short film at the Oscars.

His debut feature comedy-thriller film, Naga, premiered in the midnight madness section at Toronto International Film Festival, and stars Saudi American actress Adwa Bader (who was also selected for TIFF Rising Stars. The film tells the story of a Saudi woman who breaks the curfew imposed by her conservative father to go on a date, but finds herself stranded in the desert with creepy men and a rabid camel.

== Early life and education ==
He is a New York Film Academy Screenplay graduate.
