= 2025 Red Sea International Film Festival =

Film festival in Jeddah, Saudi Arabia

Red Sea International Film Festival مهرجان البحر الأحمر السينمائي الدولي
- Location: Jeddah, Saudi Arabia
- Founded: 2019
- Hosted by: Red Sea Film Festival Foundation
- Festival date: 4 December 2022–13 December 2022
- Language: Arabic; English
- Website: RSFF

Red Sea International Film Festival
- 2026 2024

The 2025 Red Sea International Film Festival took place from December 4 to 13, 2025, in Jeddah, Saudi Arabia, and marked the fifth edition of the film festival. It was held in the newly built Cultural Square venue in the Al-Balad district of Jeddah.

The Red Sea jury was headed by Sean Baker; 16 films were selected for competition.

In addition to screening films for competition, the film festival also hosted talks and discussions, galas and parties, and other events for the industry.

== Jury ==
=== Features ===
- Sean Baker
- Nadine Labaki
- Riz Ahmed
- Naomie Harris
- Olga Kurylenko

== Official selection ==
The festival lineup was announced on November 4, 2025.

=== In Competition ===
Title	Director(s)	Production country
A Sad and Beautiful World	Cyril Aris	Lebanon, United States, Germany, Saudi Arabia, Qatar
All That's Left of You	Cherien Dabis	Germany, Greece, Jordan, Cyprus, Palestine
Allah Is Not Obliged	Zaven Najjar	France, Luxembourg, Belgium, Canada, Saudi Arabia
Barni	Mohammed Sheikh	Somalia, Djibouti, United States
Black Rabbit, White Rabbit	Shahram Mokri	Tajikistan, United Arab Emirates
Hijra	Shahad Ameen	Saudi Arabia, Iraq, Egypt, United Kingdom
Irkalla: Gilgamesh's Dream	Mohamed Al-Daradji	Iraq, United Kingdom, France, United Arab Emirates, Saudi Arabia, Qatar
Lost Land	Akio Fujimoto	Japan, France, Malaysia, Germany
Nighttime Sounds	Zhang Zhongchen	China
Roqia	Yanis Koussim	France, Algeria, Qatar, Saudi Arabia
Sink	Zain Duraie	Jordan, Saudi Arabia, Qatar, France
The Stories	Abu Bakr Shawky	Egypt, France, Austria, Sweden
The World of Love	Yoon Ga-eun	South Korea
Truck Mama	Zippy Nyaruri	Kenya, South Africa, Saudi Arabia, Netherlands
Two Seasons, Two Strangers	Shô Miyake	Japan
Yunan	Ameer Fakher Eldin	Germany, Canada, Italy, Palestine, Qatar, Jordan, Saudi Arabia

=== Arab Spectacular ===
Title	Director(s)	Production country
A Matter of Life and Death	Anas Ba-Tahaf	Saudi Arabia
Palestine 36	Annemarie Jacir	Palestine, United Kingdom, France, Denmark, Norway, Qatar, Saudi Arabia, Jordan
The Fakenapping	Amine Lakhnech	Saudi Arabia
Unidentified	Haifaa al-Mansour	Saudi Arabia
Wedding Rehearsal	Amira Diab	Egypt

=== International Spectacular ===
Title	Director(s)	Production country
Couture	Alice Winocour	France, United States
Desert Warrior	Rupert Wyatt	Saudi Arabia
Farruquito	Santi Aguado, Reuben Atlas	Spain, United States
Scarlet	Mamoru Hosoda	Japan
The Wizard of the Kremlin	Olivier Assayas	France

=== Shorts Competition ===
Title	Director(s)	Production country
With the Wind	Ines Lehaire	
Coyotes	Said Zagha	
Jeem 1983	Jorj Abou Mhaya	
Irtizaz	Sara Balghonaim	
Dropless	Anamika Pal	
In the Valley	Lim Han Loong	
The Seventh Month	Aizada Amangeldy	
The Sea Remembers My Name	Hussein Hossam	
Umbilical Cord (film)	Ahmed Hassan Ahmed	
Vultures	Dian Weys	
What Remains	Xiao Yan	
Four Wise Monkeys	Xin Wang	
Guardian of the Well	Bentley Brown, Tahir Mahamat Zene	
Opening Ceremony	Hussain Al Mutlaq	
She's Swimming	Liliane Rahal	
The Men's Land	Mariam Khatchvani	
Beyond the Mind	Lanya Nooralddin	
Cold Calling	Yuzana Win	
Nsala	Mickael-Sltan Mbanza	
Our Brother	Shandra Apondi	
Quo Vadis, Meryem!	Amine Zeriouh	
What If They Bomb Here Tonight?	Samir Syriani	
Empty Lands	Karim Eldin Elalfy	

=== New Saudi Cinema Shorts ===
Title	Director(s)	Production country
The Scene	Lana Komsany	
Azur	Abdulwahab Bin Shaddad	
Antagonist	Abdulkarim Bawazir	
Guardian of History	Ali Alsumayin	
Market Dynamo	Ali Baqir Alabdullah	
The Cradle	Mamdouh Salem Baajajah	
Unknown	Ibrahim Al-Bakiri	
Ashura's Voice	Zaki Alabdullah	
Esc	Khaled Nadershah	
The Golden Fish	Meria Saimaldeher	
The Man Who Stumbled By His Words	Mubarak Al-Zawba	
First Funeral Day	Nawaf Al Hoshan	
Wajoom	Maan Yeslam Al-Siari	
Sharshura	Ahmed Alnasser	
Business Bag	Rwad Khalid	
Midnight Snack	Abdulmalik Bukhari	
Mubham	Muhannad Al Zahrani	
Scream of An Ant	Lujain Salaam	
Serial Writer	Eslam Shaker, Khaled Abdelfatah	
Moms Cry Too	Rmas Al Hazmi	

=== New Vision ===
Title	Director(s)	Production country
Somewhere Else	Haya Alghanim	
Early Days	Priyankar Patra	India, Singapore
If I Had Legs I'd Kick You	Mary Bronstein	
In-I: In Motion	Juliette Binoche	
Rose of Nevada	Mark Jenkin	
The Finale	Rodolphe Chedid	
Cleanse the Streets	Aysha Shahaltough	
Jareesh Salam	Zahra Mohammed, Tala Alharbi	
No Land in Sight	Eiman Alkhalifa	
Of Burning Memories & Wounds	Suha Belal	

=== Families and Children ===
Title	Director(s)	Production country
Doraemon: Nobita's Art World Tales	Yukiyo Teramoto	
The SpongeBob Movie: Search for SquarePants	Derek Drymon	
Ghost School	Seemab Gul	

=== Families and Children ===
Title	Director(s)	Production country
Aida	Ahmed Badrakhan	
Nashid al-Amal	Ahmed Badrakhan	
Silent Spectacular	Charlie Chaplin, Leo McCarey	
Spellbound	Alfred Hitchcock	
The Big Blue	Luc Besson	
Umrao Jaan	Muzaffar Ali	

=== Series ===
Title	Director(s)	Production country
El'Sardines	Zoulikha Tahar	

=== Special Screenings ===
Title	Director(s)	Production country
Human Tide	David Ward	
Circles of Life	Khaled Al-Dusaimani	
Beyond the Shifting Sands	Abdullah Al-Hamdi	
Seven Summits	Amir El-Shenawy	
Noor	Omar Almuqarri	

=== Voices of Tomorrow ===
Title	Director(s)	Production country
Two Out of Ten	Abdulaziz Sultan Alzahrani	
The Precious Gift	Abdulrahman Sultan	
Alone	Yazan Ahmad Eesa Qisi	
Friends Game	Zeyad Khalid Bakoor	
Just a Tone	Aacer Ayman Aladnani	

=== Special Screenings ===
Title	Director(s)	Production country
The Voice of Hind Rajab	Kaouther Ben Hania	Tunisia, France
Sirāt	Oliver Laxe	Spain, France
Kill Bill: The Whole Bloody Affair	Quentin Tarantino	

== Awards ==
Award	Winner
Golden Yusr Award—Best Feature Film	Lost Land, dir. Akio Fujimoto
Silver Yusr Award—Best Feature Film	All That's Left of You, dir. Cherien Dabis
Film AlUla Audience Award—Best Film	My Father's Scent, dir. Mohamed Siam
Film AlUla Audience Award—Best Saudi Film	Hijra, dir. Shahad Ameen
Best Documentary	In-I: In Motion, dir. Juliette Binoche
Cinematic Achievement	Nighttime Sounds, dir. Zhang Zhongchen
Best Actor	Georges Khabbaz for Yunan
Best Actress	Seo Su-bin for The World of Love
Best Screenplay	A Sad and Beautiful World, written by Cyril Aris
Best Director	Ameer Fakher Eldin for Yunan
Jury Prize	Hijra, dir. Shahad Ameen
Golden Yusr—Best Short Film	Coyotes, dir. Said Zagha
Silver Yusr—Best Short Film	Empty Lands, dir. Karim Eldin Elalfy
Short Special Mention	Jeem 1983, dir. Jorj Abou Mhaya

== Weather ==
On December 9, 2025, torrential rains struck Jeddah, Saudi Arabia, prompting film festival organizers to notify attendees to "shelter in place" and suspend programming for the rest of the day.
