= List of Saudi Arabian submissions for the Academy Award for Best International Feature Film =

List of films

Best International Feature Film submissions from Saudi Arabia

Highlights
- Debut: 2013
- Submissions: 9
- Nominations: none
- Oscar winners: none

Saudi Arabia submitted a film for the Academy Award for Best International Feature Film (Note: The category was previously named the Academy Award for Best Foreign Language Film, but this was changed to the Academy Award for Best International Feature Film in April 2019, after the Academy deemed the word "Foreign" to be outdated.) for the first time in 2013. The award is handed out annually by the United States Academy of Motion Picture Arts and Sciences to a feature-length motion picture produced outside the United States that contains primarily non-English dialogue. It was not created until the 1956 Academy Awards, in which a competitive Academy Award of Merit, known as the Best Foreign Language Film Award, was created for non-English speaking films, and has been given annually since.

As of 2026, Saudi Arabia has submitted nine films, but none of them were nominated.

== Submissions ==
The Academy of Motion Picture Arts and Sciences has invited the film industries of various countries to submit their best film for the Academy Award for Best International Feature Film since 1956. The International Feature Film Committee oversees the process and reviews all the submitted films. Following this, they vote via secret ballot to determine the five nominees for the award.

All films submitted are primarily in Arabic. Below is a list of the films that have been submitted by Saudi Arabia for review by the Academy for the award by year and the respective Academy Awards ceremony.

Year (Ceremony)	Film title used in nomination	Original title	Director(s)	Result
2013 (86th)	Wadjda	وجدة	Haifaa al-Mansour	Not nominated
2016 (89th)	Barakah Meets Barakah	بركة يقابل بركة	Mahmoud Sabbagh	Not nominated
2019 (92nd)	The Perfect Candidate	المرشح المثالي	Haifaa al-Mansour	Not nominated
2020 (93rd)	Scales	سيدة البحر	Shahad Ameen	Not nominated
2021 (94th)	The Tambour of Retribution	حد الطار	Abdulaziz Alshlahei	Not nominated
2022 (95th)	Raven Song	الھامور ح.ع	Mohamed Al-Salman	Not nominated
2023 (96th)	Alhamour H.A.	أغنية الغراب	Abdulelah Alqurashi	Not nominated
2025 (98th)	Hijra	هجری	Shahad Ameen	Not nominated
2026 (99th)	A Matter of Life and Death	مسألة حياة أو موت	Anas Ba-Tahaf	Pending

== See also ==
- List of Academy Award winners and nominees for Best International Feature Film
- List of Academy Award-winning foreign language films
