= 76th Venice International Film Festival =

Italian film festival in 2019

- Official festival poster by Lorenzo Mattotti.
- Opening film: The Truth
- Closing film: The Burnt Orange Heresy
- Location: Venice, Italy
- Founded: 1932
- Awards: Golden Lion: Joker
- Hosted by: Alessandra Mastronardi
- Artistic director: Alberto Barbera
- Festival date: 28 August – 7 September 2019
- Website: labiennale.org/en/cinema

Venice Film Festival chronology
- 77th 75th

The 76th annual Venice International Film Festival was held from 28 August to 7 September 2019, at Venice Lido in Italy.

Argentine filmmaker Lucrecia Martel was the jury president for the main competition. Alessandra Mastronardi hosted the opening and closing nights of the festival. The Golden Lion was awarded to Joker by Todd Phillips.

The festival opened with The Truth by Hirokazu Kore-eda, and closed with The Burnt Orange Heresy by Giuseppe Capotondi.

== Juries ==
=== Main Competition (Venezia 76) ===
- Lucrecia Martel, Argentine filmmaker - Jury President
- Piers Handling, Canadian film historian and critic, executive director of the Toronto International Film Festival
- Mary Harron, Canadian filmmaker
- Stacy Martin, French actress
- Rodrigo Prieto, Mexican cinematographer
- Shinya Tsukamoto, Japanese filmmaker and actor
- Paolo Virzì, Italian filmmaker

=== Orizzonti ===
- Susanna Nicchiarelli, Italian filmmaker - Jury President
- Mark Adams, artistic director of the Edinburgh International Film Festival
- Rachid Bouchareb, French filmmaker
- Álvaro Brechner, Uruguayan filmmaker
- Eva Sangiorgi, artistic director of the Vienna International Film Festival

=== Luigi De Laurentiis Award for a Debut Film ===
- Emir Kusturica, Serbian filmmaker and actor - Jury President
- Antonietta De Lillo, Italian director and screenwriter
- Terence Nance, American filmmaker
- Hend Sabry, Tunisian actress
- Michael J. Werner, American-Hongkongese film producer

=== Venice Virtual Reality ===
- Laurie Anderson, American composer, artist and director - Jury President
- Francesco Carrozzini, Italian photographer
- Alysha Naples, Italian designer

=== Venice Classics ===
- Costanza Quatriglio, Italian director and screenwriter

== Official Section ==
=== In Competition ===
The following films were selected for the main international competition:

English title	Original title	Director(s)	Production country
About Endlessness	Om det oändliga	Roy Andersson	Sweden, Germany, Norway
Ad Astra		James Gray	United States
Babyteeth		Shannon Murphy	Australia
The Domain	A Herdade	Tiago Guedes	Portugal, France
Ema		Pablo Larraín	Chile
Gloria Mundi		Robert Guédiguian	France
Guest of Honour		Atom Egoyan	Canada
Joker		Todd Phillips	United States
The Laundromat		Steven Soderbergh	United States
The Mafia Is No Longer What It Used to Be	La mafia non è più quella di una volta	Franco Maresco	Italy
Marriage Story		Noah Baumbach	United States, United Kingdom
Martin Eden		Pietro Marcello	Italy, France
The Mayor of Rione Sanità	Il sindaco del Rione Sanità	Mario Martone	Italy
No.7 Cherry Lane	繼園臺七號	Yonfan	Hong Kong, China
An Officer and a Spy	J'accuse	Roman Polanski	France, Italy
The Painted Bird	Nabarvené ptáče	Václav Marhoul	Czechia, Slovakia, Ukraine
The Perfect Candidate	المرشحة المثالية	Haifaa al-Mansour	Saudi Arabia
Saturday Fiction	兰心大剧院	Lou Ye	China
The Truth (opening film)	La vérité	Hirokazu Kore-eda	Japan, France
Waiting for the Barbarians		Ciro Guerra	Italy, United States
Wasp Network		Olivier Assayas	France, Brazil, Spain, Belgium

=== Out of competition ===
The following films were selected to be screened out of competition:

English title	Original title	Director(s)	Production country
Fiction
Adults in the Room		Costa-Gavras	France, Greece
The Burnt Orange Heresy (closing film)		Giuseppe Capotondi	United Kingdom, Italy
The King		David Michôd	United Kingdom, Hungary
Mosul		Matthew Michael Carnahan	United States
Seberg		Benedict Andrews	United States, United Kingdom
To Live	Vivere	Francesca Archibugi	Italy
Volare	Tutto il mio folle amore	Gabriele Salvatores	Italy
Non Fiction
45 Seconds of Laughter		Tim Robbins	United States
Citizen K		Alex Gibney	United Kingdom, United States
Citizen Rosi		Didi Gnocchi and Carolina Rosi	Italy
Collective	Colectiv	Alexander Nanau	Romania, Luxemburg
I diari di Angela - Noi due cineasti. Capitolo secondo		Yervant Gianikian and Angela Ricci Lucchi	Italy
The Kingmaker		Lauren Greenfield	United States
Il pianeta in mare		Andrea Segre	Italy
Roger Waters: Us + Them		Roger Waters	United Kingdom
State Funeral	Государственные похороны	Sergei Loznitsa	Netherlands, Lithuania
Woman		Yann Arthus-Bertrand and Anastasia Mikova	France
Special screenings
Electric Swan		Konstantina Kotzamani	France, Greece, Argentina
Eyes Wide Shut (1999)		Stanley Kubrick	United Kingdom, United States
Irréversible - Inversion intégrale (2002)		Gaspar Noé	France
Never Just a Dream: Stanley Kubrick and Eyes Wide Shut		Matt Wells	United Kingdom
The New Pope (episodes 2 and 7)		Paolo Sorrentino	Italy, France, Spain
No One Left Behind		Guillermo Arriaga	Mexico
ZeroZeroZero (episodes 1 and 2)		Stefano Sollima	Italy

=== Orizzonti ===
The following films were selected for the Horizons (Orizzonti) section:

English title	Original title	Director(s)	Production country
Main Competition
A Son	بيك نعيش	Mehdi Barsaoui	Tunisia, France, Lebanon, Qatar
Atlantis	Атлантида	Valentyn Vasyanovych	Ukraine
Back Home	Revenir	Jessica Palud	France
Balloon	气球	Pema Tseden	China
White on White	Blanco en blanco	Théo Court	Spain, Chile, France, Germany
The Criminal Man	ბოროტმოქმედი	Dmitry Mamuliya	Georgia, Russia
Giants Being Lonely		Grear Patterson	United States
Hava, Maryam, Ayesha		Sahraa Karimi	Afghanistan
Just 6.5	متری شش و نیم	Saeed Roustayi	Iran
Mother	Madre	Rodrigo Sorogoyen	Spain, France
My Days of Glory	Mes jours de gloire	Antoine de Bary	France
Moffie		Oliver Hermanus	South Africa
Nevia		Nunzia De Stefano	Italy
Pelican Blood	Pelikanblut	Katrin Gebbe	Germany, Bulgaria
Rialto		Peter Mackie Burns	Ireland
Shadow of Water	ചോല	Sanal Kumar Sasidharan	India
Sole		Carlo Sironi	Italy
Verdict		Raymund Ribay Gutierrez	Philippines
Zumiriki		Óskar Alegría	Spain
Short films – In competition
After Two Hours, Ten Minutes Had Passed	Nach zwei Stunden waren zehn Minuten vergangen	Steffen Goldkamp	Germany
Austral Fever	Fiebre austral	Thomas Woodroffe	Chile
Darling		Saim Sadiq	Pakistan, United States
Delphine		Chloé Robichaud	Canada
The Diver		Jamie Helmer, Michael Leonard	France, Australia
Dogs Barking at Birds	Cães que ladram aos pássaros	Leonor Teles	Portugal
Give Up the Ghost		Zain Duraie	Jordan, Sweden
Kingdom Come		Sean Robert Dunn	United Kingdom
Sand	Morae	Kim Kyung-rae	South Korea
Sh_t Happens		David Štumpf, Michaela Mihályi	Czech Republic, Slovakia
Superheroes Without Superpowers	Supereroi senza superpoteri	Beatrice Baldacci	Italy
The Tears Thing	Le coup des larmes	Clémence Poésy	France
Roqaia		Diana Saqeb Jamal	Afghanistan, Bangladesh
Short films – Out of competition
Condor One		Kevin Jerome Everson	United States
GUO4		Peter Strickland	Hungary

=== Venice Classics ===
The following films were selected to be screened in the Venice Classics section:

English title	Original title	Director(s)	Production country
Restored films
Crash (1996)		David Cronenberg	Canada
The Criminal Life of Archibaldo de la Cruz (1955)	Ensayo de un crimen	Luis Buñuel	Mexico
Death of a Bureaucrat (1966)	La muerte de un burócrata	Tomás Gutiérrez Alea	Cuba
Ecstasy (1933)	Extase	Gustav Machatý	Czechoslovakia
Francisca (1981)		Manoel de Oliveira	Portugal
The Grim Reaper (1962)	La commare secca	Bernardo Bertolucci	Italy
The House Is Black (1962)	خانه سیاه است	Forough Farrokhzad	Iran
The Incredible Shrinking Man (1957)		Jack Arnold	United States
Maria Zef (1981)		Vittorio Cottafavi	Italy
Mauri (1988)		Merata Mita	New Zealand
New York, New York (1977)		Martin Scorsese	United States
Out of the Blue (1980)		Dennis Hopper	Canada, United States
The Red Snowball Tree (1973)	Калина красная	Vasily Shukshin	Soviet Union
Sodrásban (1964)		István Gaál	Hungary
The Spider's Stratagem (1970)	Strategia del ragno	Bernardo Bertolucci	Italy
The Hills of Marlik (1964)	تپه‌های مارلیک	Ebrahim Golestan	Iran
Tiro al piccione (1961)		Giuliano Montaldo	Italy
Tomorrow Is My Turn (1960)	Le Passage du Rhin	André Cayatte	France, West Germany, Italy
Way of a Gaucho (1952)		Jacques Tourneur	United States
The White Sheik (1952)	Lo sceicco bianco	Federico Fellini	Italy
Documentaries on cinema
Andrey Tarkovsky: A Cinema Prayer		Andrey Tarkovsky Jr.	Russia
Babenco: Tell Me When I Die	Babenco - Alguém tem que ouvir o coração e dizer: parou	Bárbara Paz	Brazil
Boia, maschere e segreti: L'horror italiano degli anni sessanta		Steve Della Casa	Italy
Eight Hundred Times Lonely	800 Mal Einsam - Ein Tag mit dem Filmemacher Edgar Reitz	Anna Hepp	Germany
Fellini fine mai		Eugenio Cappuccio	Italy
Fulci for Fake		Simone Scafidi	Italy
Life As a B-movie: Piero Vivarelli		Fabrizio Laurenti, Niccolò Vivarelli	Italy
Leap of Faith: William Friedkin on The Exorcist		Alexandre O. Philippe	United States
Se c'è un aldilà sono fottuto: Vita e cinema di Claudio Caligari		Simone Isola, Fausto Trombetta	Italy

=== Sconfini ===
The following films were selected for the Sconfini section:

English title	Original title	Director(s)	Production country
American Skin		Nate Parker	United States
Beyond the Beach: The Hell and the Hope		Graeme A. Scott, Buddy Squires	United Kingdom
Chiara Ferragni – Unposted		Elisa Amoruso	Italy
Effetto domino		Alessandro Rossetto	Italy
Once More Unto the Breach	Il varco	Federico Ferrone, Michele Manzolini	Italy
The Scarecrows	Les épouvantails	Nouri Bouzid	Tunisia, Morocco, Luxembourg

== Independent Sections ==
=== Venice International Critics' Week ===
The following films were selected for the 34th Venice International Critics' Week (Italian: Settimana Internazionale della Critica):

English title	Original title	Director(s)	Production country
In competition
All This Victory	Jeedar el sot	Ahmad Ghossein	Lebanon, France, Qatar
Parthenon	Partenonas	Mantas Kvedaravičius	Lithuania, Ukraine, France
The Prince	El príncipe	Sebastian Muñoz	Chile, Argentina, Belgium
Psychosia	Psykosia	Marie Grahtø	Denmark, Finland
Rare Beasts		Billie Piper	United Kingdom
Scales	Sayidat al Bahr	Shahad Ameen	United Arab Emirates, Iraq, Saudi Arabia
Tony Driver		Ascanio Petrini	Italy, Mexico
Special events – Out of competition
Bombay Rose (opening film)		Gitanjali Rao	India, United Kingdom, France
Sanctorum (closing film)		Joshua Gil	Mexico, Dominican Republic, Qatar

=== Giornate degli Autori ===
The following films were selected for the 16th edition of the Giornate degli Autori section:

English title	Original title	Director(s)	Production country
In Competition
5 is the Perfect Number	5 è il numero perfetto	Igort	Italy, Belgium, France
Arab Blues	Un divan à Tunis	Manele Labidi Labbé	Tunisia, France
Beware of Children	Barn	Dag Johan Haugerud	Norway, Sweden
A Bigger World	Un monde plus grand	Fabienne Berthaud	France, Belgium
Corpus Christi	Boże Ciało	Jan Komasa	Poland, France
La Llorona		Jayro Bustamante	Guatemala, France
Lingua Franca (opening film)		Isabel Sandoval	United States, Philippines
The Long Walk	ບໍ່ມີວັນຈາກ	Mattie Do	Laos
Only the Animals	Seules les bêtes	Dominik Moll	France, Germany
You Will Die at Twenty	ستموت في العشرين	Amjad Abu Alala	Sudan, France, Egypt, Germany, Norway
They Say Nothing Stays the Same	ある 船頭 の 話	Joe Odagiri	Japan
Out of competition
Time of the Untamed (closing film)	Les chevaux voyageurs	Bartabas	France
Special events
Burning Cane		Phillip Youmans	United States
House of Cardin		P. David Ebersole, Todd Hughes	United States
Mondo Sexy		Mario Sesti	Italy
My Brother Chases Dinosaurs	Mio fratello rincorre i dinosauri	Stefano Cipani	Italy, Spain
Il prigioniero		Federico Olivetti	Italy
Scherza con i fanti		Gianfranco Pannone	Italy
Miu Miu Women's Tales
#17 Shako Mako		Hailey Gates	Italy, United States
#18 Brigitte		Lynne Ramsay	Italy, United Kingdom

== Official Awards ==
=== In Competition ===
- Golden Lion: Joker by Todd Phillips
- Grand Jury Prize: An Officer and a Spy by Roman Polanski
- Silver Lion: Roy Andersson for About Endlessness
- Volpi Cup for Best Actress: Ariane Ascaride for Gloria Mundi
- Volpi Cup for Best Actor: Luca Marinelli for Martin Eden
- Best Screenplay: No.7 Cherry Lane by Yonfan
- Special Jury Prize: The Mafia Is No Longer What It Used to Be by Franco Maresco
- Marcello Mastroianni Award: Toby Wallace for Babyteeth

=== Orizzonti ===
- Best Film: Atlantis by Valentyn Vasyanovych
- Best Director: Théo Court for White on White
- Special Jury Prize: Verdict by Raymund Ribas Gutierrez
- Best Actress: Marta Nieto for Madre
- Best Actor: Sami Bouajila for A Son
- Best Screenplay: Back Home by Jessica Palud
- Horizons Prize for Best Short: Darling by Saim Sadiq

=== Luigi De Laurentiis Award for a Debut Film (Lion of the Future) ===
- You Will Die at Twenty by Amjad Abu Alala

=== Venezia Classici Awards ===
- Best Documentary on Cinema: Babenco: Tell Me When I Die
- Best Restored Film: Ecstasy (1933)

=== Golden Lion for Lifetime Achievement ===
- Pedro Almodóvar
- Julie Andrews

== Independent Sections Awards ==
The following collateral awards were conferred to films of the autonomous sections:

=== Giornate degli Autori ===
- GdA Director's Award: La Llorona by Jayro Bustamante
- Europa Cinemas Label: Corpus Christi by Jan Komasa

== Independent Awards ==
=== SIAE Award ===
- Marco Bellocchio for The Traitor

=== Fondazione Mimmo Rotella Award ===
- Donald Sutherland and Mick Jagger for The Burnt Orange Heresy

=== Campari Passion for the Cinema Award ===
- Luca Bigazzi for The New Pope

=== Bresson Award ===
- Lucrecia Martel
