= Early Days (film) =

2025 film by Priyankar Patra

- Directed by: Priyankar Patra
- Written by: Priyankar Patra
- Produced by: Priyankar Patra; Anupam Sinha Roy; Aditya Vikram Sengupta; Zara Sengupta; Isabella-Sreyashii Sen; Olivier A. Dock; Raunak Rakhit; Dipankar Patra; Baisakhi Patra
- Starring: Manasi Kaushik; Sarthak Sharma
- Cinematography: Priyankar Patra
- Edited by: Anupam Sinha Roy
- Music by: Shibasish Banerjee
- Production companies: For Films; Hazelnut Media
- Release date: 2025
- Running time: 102 minutes
- Countries: India, Singapore
- Language: Hindi

Early Days is a 2025 debut romance-drama film directed by Priyankar Patra. It had its world premiere in the New Visions Competition of the Red Sea International Film Festival. The film explores relationships on the digital era and follows a couple in Mumbai, India, whose love becomes intertwined with social media.

== Cast ==
- Manasi Kaushik as Preeti
- Sarthak Sharma as Samrat

== Production ==
Patra stated in interviews that the first spark for the film came from his younger cousin who is a content creator.

The film production started as a weekend experiment between four friends shot primarily with a handheld camcorder to give a voyeuristic closeness to the characters. This was contrasted with high definition videos shot on phones to display the life that's put out to the public.

The production slowly evolved into a full-fledged international co-production with Singaporean company, Hazelnut Media coming onboard during the subsequent stages.

== Release ==
The first look teaser of the film was released by Variety ahead of the world premier at Red Sea International Film Festival.

== Critical reception ==
Calling it an "elegant Mumbai-set debut," Screen Daily found that "Patra's script doesn't say anything new about culture and social media" but still noted "an authentic understanding of the ephemeral or diaphonous nature of influence and its appeal" while also lauding Manasi Kaushik and Sarthak Sharma's performances.

Asian Movie Pulse noted some technical errors with the film, such as its audio issues and "exhausting" camerawork, but overall lauded its acting, style, and commentary. Asian Movie Pulse ends the review by calling it a film rooted in art house tradition and "it is difficult not to wonder how Patra might evolve with a larger budget at his disposal" Outlook India gave the film three and a half stars out of five, and added Early Days is "a deeply nuanced, delicate study of a relationship in churn, torn between projection and survival."

The film also generated conversations online about influencer culture and its impact on personal relationships. Homegrown writes about how the film "draws a fascinating parallel between influencer culture and the informal economy — one that mirrors every other unstable hustle the underprivileged have taken on for decades to survive in cities like Mumbai". Indigenous mentions how aspiration has become the currency for the content-economy and with the film has left the generation living in the internet "slightly unsettled" without passing any negative judgements on the characters.

== Accolades ==
Event	Date of Ceremony	Award	Recipient	Result	Ref
Red Sea International Film Festival	10 December 2025	Film Alula Audience Award - International Film	Early Days	Nominated	
New York Indian Film Festival	28 May 2026	Best Debut Film	Early Days	Nominated	
New York Indian Film Festival	28 May 2026	Best Screenplay	Priyankar Patra	Nominated	
Tasveer Film Festival	19 October 2026	Best Director	Priyankar Patra	Won	

== Festival Screenings ==
- Red Sea International Film Festival
- New York Indian Film Festival
- Indian Film Festival of Melbourne
- Tasveer Film Festival
- The Indian Film Festival of New Zealand
- Jogra-NETPAC Asian Film Festival
