= Red Sea International Film Festival =

Film festival in Jeddah, Saudi Arabia

Red Sea International Film Festival مهرجان البحر الأحمر السينمائي الدولي
- Location: Arbaeen lagoon, Al Madinah Al Munawarah Road, old town Jeddah, Saudi Arabia
- Founded: 2019
- Most recent: 2025
- Awards: The Yusr Awards
- Film titles: 138 from 67 countries
- Hosted by: Red Sea Film Festival Foundation
- Festival date: Opening: 4 December 2025; Closing: 13 December 2025
- Language: Arabic; English
- Website: RSFF

Red Sea International Film Festival
- 2026 2024

The Red Sea International Film Festival (Arabic: مهرجان البحر الأحمر السينمائي الدولي) is a film festival launched in 2019 and held in Jeddah, the port city in western Saudi Arabia. The festival mainly focuses on new storytelling trends, as well as emerging talents from Saudi Arabia, the Arab world and the rest of the world.

The festival’s fifth edition in 2025 will take place from December 4 to 13 at Jeddah’s historic Al Balad district.

== History ==
The Red Sea International Film Festival was established in 2019, as a plan to revive Saudi cinema. Originally scheduled to launch in March 2020, it was cancelled due to the impact of the COVID-19 pandemic in Saudi Arabia. It inaugurated its first edition in November 2021, with the selection of Joe Wright's Cyrano.

== Organization ==
The festival is organized and operated by the Red Sea Film Festival Foundation, a non-profit cultural organization registered in Saudi Arabia. The Foundation is chaired by Jomana Alrashid; Chief Executive Officer (CEO) of the Saudi Research and Media Group – SRMG.

== Celebrities ==
The festival is known for drawing a wide list of A-list Hollywood celebrities, with Variety reporting that in 2023 Will Smith and Gwyneth Paltrow were paid $1 million or more to make an appearance.

== Festivals ==
=== 2021 edition ===
The first edition of the festival opened on 6 December 2021 with Joe Wright's Cyrano at Jeddah, Saudi Arabia. 138 films from 67 countries were screened at the festival, which included 16 films in competition section. It closed on 15 December with the world premiere of Kabir Khan's film 83. The event came after several boycott calls by the critics, who warned that the Saudi authorities were attempting to divert the international attention from the country's poor human rights records. The Kingdom was being accused of using culture to whitewash its image at a global level. One of the critics said that without freedom of speech, the festival descended into propaganda.

Red Sea Competition

- Brighton 4th, dir: Levan Koguashvili
- Communion, dir: Nejib Belkadhi
- PAKA (River of Blood), dir: Nithin Lukose
- Huda's Salon, dir: Hany Abu-Assad
- Soula, dir: Salah Issaad
- Europa, dir: Haider Rashid
- Yuni, dir: Kamila Andini
- Saloum, dir: Jean Luc Herbulot
- Rupture, dir: Hamzah Jamjoom
- Rehana Maryam Noor, dir: Abdullah Mohammad Saad
- Hit the Road, dir: Panah Panahi
- Life Suits Me Well, dir: Al Hadi Ulad-Mohand
- Neighbours, dir: Mano Khalil
- Farha, dir: Darin J Sallam
- Sharaf, dir: Samir Nasr
- The Alleys, dir: Bassel Ghandour

Winners

Best Film
- Best Film: Brighton 4th by Levan Koguashvili – Georgia, Russia, Bulgaria, USA, Monaco.
Best Director
- Best Director: Europa by Haider Rashid – Iraq, Italy, Kuwait
- Jury Prize: Hit the Road by Panah Panahi – Iran
- Best Actor: Adam Ali for Europa – Iraq, Italy, Kuwait
- Best Actress: Arawinda Kirana for Yuni – Indonesia, Singapore, France, Australia
- Best Saudi Film: Rupture by Hamzah K. Jamjoom – Saudi Arabia
- Audience Award: You Resemble Me by Dina Amer – Egypt, France, U.S.
- Immersive Silver Yusr: Samsara by Hsin-Chien Huang – Taiwan
- Immersive Gold Yusr: End of Night by David Adler – Denmark, France
- Short Competition Golden Yusr: Tala’Vision by Murad Abu Eisheh – Jordan, Germany
- Special Mention: Farha by Darin J. Sallam – Jordan
- Best Cinematic Contribution: Amin Jafari for Hit the Road – Iran
- Best Screenplay: Neighbours by Mano Khalil – Syria, Switzerland

=== 2024 editition ===
Spike Lee served as Jury President. Notable attendees included Cynthia Erivo, Ariana Grande, Jeremy Renner, Michael Douglas, Benedict Cumberbatch, Hala Elkoussy, Sarah Friedland, Kathleen Chalfant, Lawrence Valin and R.T. Thorne.

=== 2025 edition ===
The 5th edition of the festival is taking place from 4 to 13 December in Jeddah, Saudi Arabia. It will screen 100+ films around 70 countries. 2025 biographical sports drama film Giant of the boxer Prince Naseem Hamed by Rowan Athale was the opening film of the festival. Sean Baker is serving as Jury President.

French actress Juliette Binoche, French film director and producer Rachid Bouchareb, English actor Michael Caine Hong Kong film director, producer, stunt choreographer, screenwriter, entrepreneur and philanthropist Stanley Tong and American actress Sigourney Weaver were recognised for their contributions to cinema throughout their careers. The Golden Globes awarded Indian actress Alia Bhatt the Golden Globes Horizon Award and Tunisian actress Hend Sabry the Omar Sharif Award for their contributions to international cinema.

==== Award winners ====
The following are award winners of this edition:

Red Sea: Competition

- Golden Yusr Best Feature Film: Lost Land – Akio Fujimoto
- Silver Yusr Feature Film: All That's Left of You – Cherien Dabis
- Yusr Best Director: Ameer Fakher Eldin – Yunan
- Yusr Jury Prize: Hijra – Shahad Ameen
- Yusr Best Actor: Georges Khabbaz – Yunan
- Yusr Best Actress: Seo Su-bin – The World of Love
- Yusr Best Screenplay: A Sad and Beautiful World – Cyril Aris
- Yusr Cinematic Achievement: Nighttime Sounds – Zhang Zhongchen (China)

Red Sea: Shorts Competition

- Golden Yusr Best Short Film: Coyotes - Said Zagha
- Silver Yusr Short Film: Empty Lands - Karim Eldin Elalfy
- Short Special Mention: JEMM 1983 - Jorj Abou Mhaya

Other awards

- Al Sharq Best Documentary Award: In-I: In Motion - Juliette Binoche
- AlUla Audience Award: Saudi Film – Hijra – Shahad Ameen
- AlUla Audience Award: – Non-Saudi Film, My Father's Scent – Mohamed Siam

=== 2026 edition ===
The sixth edition of the festival has been postponed. Originally scheduled for December 3 to 12 in Jeddah, it will now be held in the fourth quarter of 2027.

== See also ==
- El Gouna Film Festival
