= Cheers, to Those Who Stay =

Lebanese 2010 short film

- Directed by: Mounia Akl; Cyril Aris
- Written by: Mounia Akl; Cyril Aris
- Starring: Kyle Stephens; Cyril Aris; Mounia Akl; Karl Noujeim; Diane Mehanna; Panos Aprahamian
- Cinematography: Kyle Stephens
- Music by: Mashrou' Leila; Paul Tyan; Walid Haddad
- Production company: Orange Dog Productions
- Release date: 24 July 2010
- Running time: 21 minutes
- Country: Lebanon
- Languages: Arabic; English

Cheers, to Those Who Stay is a 2010 Lebanese short film by Cyril Aris and Mounia Akl.

== Synopsis ==
Cheers, to Those Who Stay revolves around Kyle, a Lebanese expatriate living in Detroit and studying filmmaking there. Kyle returns to Lebanon to deal with what he describes as a director's block and to get film material for his project. Kyle stays at his cousins flat where he meets his relatives: Omar a wannabe actor who is stuck in a clerical job; Maissa a controlling character who is always right; Alex a lazy bone and speedster; Joana the underdog obsessed with cleanliness and Ziad the hopeless romantic. Through his cousins Kyle experiences Lebanese everyday people, their problems, joie de vivre and complaints about the life in Beirut.

== Cast ==
- Kyle Stephens as Kyle
- Cyril Aris as Omar
- Mounia Akl as Maissa
- Karl Noujeim as Alex
- Panos Aprahamian as Ziad
- Diane Mehanna as Joana

== Awards ==
- Los Angeles Film Festival of Hollywood Award of Merit fall 2010.
- Los Angeles Movie Awards Honorable mention 2010.
