= Sasca =

Sasca may refer to:

== Locations in Romania ==
- Sasca Montană, a commune in Caraş-Severin County, and its village of Sasca Română
- Sasca Mică and Sasca Nouă, villages in Cornu Luncii Commune, Suceava County

== Other ==
- The Saudi Arabian Society for Culture and Arts, abbreviated SASCA
