= Scales (film) =

2019 film

- Film poster
- Directed by: Shahad Ameen
- Starring: Basima Hajjar
- Cinematography: João Ribeiro
- Release date: 2 September 2019 (Venice)
- Running time: 74 minutes
- Countries: Saudi Arabia; United Arab Emirates; Iraq
- Language: Arabic
- Box office: $4,617

Scales (Arabic: سيدة البحر, romanized: Sayyidat al-Baḥri, lit. 'Mistress of the Sea') is a 2019 internationally co-produced mystery drama film directed by Shahad Ameen. It was selected as the Saudi Arabian entry for the Best International Feature Film at the 93rd Academy Awards, but it was not nominated.

== Plot ==
On a remote island, families ensure a bountiful fishing yield for the village by sacrificing a daughter to the sea. At one such ceremony, Muthana (Al Farhan), is set to sacrifice his daughter but rescues her at the last minute.

Twelve years later, the daughter, Hayat (Hajjar), is ostracized from her family and community; one of her feet is covered in a small patch of scales. Her mother's new pregnancy appears to be an opportunity for a second daughter to sacrifice, which would allow Hayat to rejoin her family. When the new child is a boy, Hayat is again brought to the sea for sacrifice, and escapes once more.

It is revealed that the villagers are harvesting and eating mermaids, who originated as the daughters sent to the sea. Hayat joins the men and boys of her village on a fishing boat, where she is often at odds with their leader, Amer (Barhoum). In a final act of defiance, she returns to the sea which swallows her whole.

== Cast ==
- Basima Hajjar as Hayat
- Yaaqoub Al Farhan as Muthana
- Abdulaziz Shtian as Yaser
- Ibrahim Al-Hasawi as Saada
- Ashraf Barhoum as Amer

== Production ==
Scales was filmed on the Musandam Peninsula in Oman.

== Release ==
Scales premiered during the International Critics' Week section of the 76th Venice International Film Festival, where it was awarded the Verona Film Club Award. In July 2021, Variance Films released the film in New York City and Los Angeles.

== Reception ==
=== Critical reception ===
On the review aggregator website Rotten Tomatoes, 91% of 32 critics' reviews are positive, with an average rating of 6.9/10. The website's consensus reads: "A gorgeous and grim portrait of female empowerment, Scales is an auspicious debut for director Shahad Ameen."

=== Accolades ===
Award	Ceremony date	Category	Recipient(s)	Result	Ref.
Venice Film Festival	7 September 2019	International Critics' Week	Scales	Nominated	
Venice Film Festival	7 September 2019	Verona Film Club Award	Scales	Won	
BFI London Film Festival	13 October 2019	Best First Feature	Scales	Won	
Carthage Film Festival	2 November 2019	Official Competition Narrative Feature Film	Scales	Bronze Tanit	
Taipei Film Festival	11 July 2020	International New Talent Competition	Scales	Nominated	
Sydney Science Fiction Film Festival	21 November 2020	Best Feature Film	Scales	Won	
Sydney Science Fiction Film Festival	21 November 2020	Best Director	Shahad Ameen	Nominated	
Sydney Science Fiction Film Festival	21 November 2020	Best Lead Actress in a Feature Film	Basima Hajjar	Nominated	
Singapore International Film Festival		Best Film	Scales	Won	

== See also ==
- List of submissions to the 93rd Academy Awards for Best International Feature Film
- List of Saudi Arabian submissions for the Academy Award for Best International Feature Film
