= No.7 Cherry Lane =

2019 Hong Kong-Chinese film by Yonfan

- Film poster
- Traditional Chinese: 繼園臺七號
- Simplified Chinese: 继园台七号
- Hanyu Pinyin: jìyuántái qīhào
- Directed by: Yonfan
- Written by: Yonfan
- Produced by: Monica Chao
- Starring: Sylvia Chang; Zhao Wei; Alex Lam; Kelly Yao; Teresa Cheung; Jiang Wenli; Natalia Duplessis; Daniel Wu; Stephen Fung; Tian Zhuangzhuang; Ann Hui; Fruit Chan; Rebecca Pan
- Edited by: Wang Haixia
- Music by: Yu Yat-yiu; Yonfan; Chapavich Temnitikul; Phasura Chanvititkul
- Distributed by: Far Sun Film Co. Ltd.
- Release date: 2 September 2019 (Venice)
- Running time: 125 minutes
- Countries: Hong Kong; China
- Languages: Mandarin; Cantonese; Shanghainese

No.7 Cherry Lane (Chinese: 繼園臺七號; pinyin: jìyuántái qīhào) is a 2019 adult animated film written and directed by Yonfan. A Hong Kong-Chinese co-production, the film was selected to compete for the Golden Lion at the 76th Venice International Film Festival, where it won the Best Screenplay Award. It was also selected for the 2019 Toronto International Film Festival as a Special Presentation.

== Plot ==
During the rise of the materialistic comfort of life in the 1960s, there emerges an undercurrent of danger in Hong Kong.

No.7 Cherry Lane tells the tale of Ziming, a Hong Kong University undergraduate, entangled between his amorous feelings for a self-exiled mother Mrs Yu from Taiwan in the White Terror period, and her beautiful daughter Meiling. He takes them to different movies and through a series of magical moments on the big screen, forbidden passions are revealed. And the era coincides with Hong Kong's turbulent times of 1967.

== Cast ==
Character	Chinese Voice actor	English voice actor
Mrs. Yu	Sylvia Chang	
Meiling	Zhao Wei	
Ziming	Alex Lam	
Mrs. May	Kelly Yao	
Madame Simone	Natalia Duplessis	
Miaoyu the Nun	Teresa Cheung	
The Woman in Yellow	Jiang Wenli	
Baron Louis	Daniel Wu	
Steven	Stephen Fung	
Ah Kwok	Tian Zhuangzhuang	
The Pickpocket	Ann Hui	
The Craven Cat	Fruit Chan	
Mrs. Lin	Rebecca Pan	
