= Giants Being Lonely =

2019 film

- Directed by: Grear Patterson
- Screenplay by: Grear Patterson
- Produced by: Olmo Schnabel
- Starring: Jack Irving, Ben Irving, Lily Gavin, Amalia Culp, Gabe Fazio
- Cinematography: Hunter Zimny
- Edited by: Ismael de Diego
- Production company: Gravitas Ventures
- Release date: September 1, 2019 (76th Venice International Film Festival)
- Running time: 81 minutes
- Country: USA
- Language: English

Giants Being Lonely is a 2019 drama film directed by Grear Patterson, written by Patterson and produced by Olmo Schnabel. The film is a bildungsroman about two boys on a high school baseball team dealing with the struggles of adolescence in a rural part of the American South. The film is the directorial debut of Patterson, who was best known as a painter and mixed media artist prior to this.

The film premiered at the 76th Venice International Film Festival and was part of the 2020 Official Selection at the Tribeca Film Festival.

== Plot ==
In Hillsborough, North Carolina, high school seniors Adam, Bobby, and Caroline experience the ups and downs of sex, loneliness, murder, and baseball during the final year of high school. Star pitcher Bobby is beloved his athletic talents, but is unmoored from life and neglected by his alcoholic father. Adam, the less skilled player, has a crush on their classmate Caroline but must deal with his abusive father and his closed off mother.
