= Irkalla: Gilgamesh's Dream =

2025 film by Mohamed Al-Daradji

- Directed by: Mohamed Al-Daradji
- Written by: Mohamed Al-Daradji; Karim Traïdia
- Produced by: Mohamed Al-Daradji; Hélène Cases
- Starring: Ameer Jabarah; Samar Kazem Jawad; Hussein Raad Zuwayr
- Production companies: Lionceau Films; Human Film; Image Nation
- Distributed by: MPM Premium
- Release date: 2025
- Running time: 107 minutes
- Countries: Iraq, United Arab Emirates, France, Qatar, Great Britain, Saudi Arabia
- Language: Arabic

Irkalla: Gilgamesh's Dream is a 2025 film directed by Mohamed Jabarah Al-Daradji which reimagines the Gilgamesh myth in the contemporary context of urban Iraq. It had its world premiere in the Piazza Grande section of the Locarno Film Festival and showed in other festivals like the Toronto International Film Festival and the Red Sea International Film Festival. The film's world sale rights were acquired by MPM Premium on August 8, 2025.

== Production ==
Al-Daradji came up with the idea for Irkalla in 2019. After spending nearly two decades with the stories of children in the crossfire of war in Iraq, he wanted to combine them with the legend of Gilgamesh, a king who hopes to bring his friend back to life by going to Irkalla, the underworld.

During principal photography, Al-Daradji shot real-life protests. On two occasions, police officers attacked his film center and "accused us of hiding people who wanted to destroy the police" despite Al-Daradji getting formal permission from the Iraqi government to film.

== Critical reception ==
Cineuropa found that the film wasn't very original or subtle in its depictions of young, urban street life in a city like Baghdad but still lauded its authenticity and sentimentality, especially with regard to a younger audience in mind.

The New Indian Express lamented that the film was both predictable and didactic, though nonetheless hopeful for its children and critical in its unflinching observations of city life.

ScreenAnarchy concluded that "The film shifts fluidly between intimate character study, societal critique, and kinetic urgency, offering more than genre hybridity, it delivers a sobering commentary on Iraq's lost generation."
