= White on White (film) =

2019 film

- Film poster
- Directed by: Théo Court
- Written by: Théo Court; Samuel M. Delgado
- Starring: Alfredo Castro; Lars Rudolph
- Production companies: El Viaje Films (Spain); Quijote Films (Chile)
- Release date: 2 September 2019 (Venice)
- Running time: 100 minutes
- Countries: Spain; Chile
- Languages: Spanish; English
- Budget: $1,000,000
- Box office: $9,171

White on White (Spanish: Blanco en blanco) is a 2019 drama film directed by Théo Court. It was screened in the Horizons section at the 76th Venice International Film Festival. At the Venice Film Festival, Théo Court won the award for Best Director in the Horizons section. It was selected as the Chilean entry for the Best International Feature Film at the 94th Academy Awards.

== Plot ==
The story is set in the Tierra del Fuego archipelago, a region located in the south of Argentina and Chile, during the second half of the 19th century. The Tierra del Fuego Land Exploitation Company (SETF) aims to exploit the lands for cattle grazing, leading to a conflict with the indigenous population, including the Selkʼnam community, which suffered from the documented Selkʼnam genocide. The SETF's procedures for land exploitation have roots in the forced displacement of populations from the Scottish Highlands in the 18th century, known in English as the Highland Clearances. Some Scots who participate in the process adapt the Highland Clearances to the environment of Tierra del Fuego to meet the landowners' requirements.

The film's aesthetic vision is centered on a photographer (played by actor Alfredo Castro) who is there to photograph the future wedding of one of the landowners, Mr. Porter, the absent protagonist of the film. Castro's role as a photographer offers a vision of his photographic compositions as a record of the facts, documenting the events that occurred in Tierra del Fuego but could happen anywhere on the planet. Three photographic compositions weave the story: the first shot of the young woman who will be the future wife, another second photo of this young girl, and a third final one of the hunters with their victims. The brutality of the events is captured in a succession of photographs that realistically describe the territory, the Tierra del Fuego archipelago, and the characters. The film received positive reviews from critics. On Rotten Tomatoes, the film holds an approval rating based on reviews from critics.

== Cast ==
- Alfredo Castro as Pedro
- Lars Rudolph as owner
- Alejandro Goic as foreman
- Lola Rubio as Aurora
- David Pantaleón as Arturo
- Ignacio Ceruti as John
- Esther Vega as Sara

== Filming locations ==
The film was shot in various locations in the Tierra del Fuego archipelago and the Canary Islands, with the final scene filmed on the Teide volcano on Tenerife.

== Awards ==
The film has been screened at numerous festivals, including the International Film Festival Rotterdam (IFFR), and has received several awards, such as the Best Director award at the Venice International Film Festival, the Official Fiction Section Award at the Toulouse Festival, as well as awards at the Havana International Festival of New Latin American Cinema and the Minsk International Film Festival (Belarus).

== See also ==
- List of submissions to the 94th Academy Awards for Best International Feature Film
- List of Chilean submissions for the Academy Award for Best International Feature Film
