= Paka (River of Blood) =

Upcoming film

Paka (The River of Blood)
- Directed by: Nithin Lukose
- Written by: Nithin Lukose
- Produced by: Raj Rachakonda; Anurag Kashyap
- Starring: Basil Paulose; Vinitha Koshy; Nithin George; Abhilash Nair; Athul John; Jose Kizhakkkan; Joseph Manikkal
- Cinematography: Srikanth Kabothu
- Edited by: Arunima Shankar
- Music by: Faizal Ahamed
- Production company: Studio 99
- Distributed by: Studio 99
- Release date: September 17, 2021 (TIFF)
- Running time: 101 minutes
- Country: India
- Language: Malayalam

Paka (River of Blood) is a 2021 Indian Malayalam language drama film written and directed by Nithin Lukose. The film stars Basil Paulose in lead role while Vinitha Koshy, Nithin George, Abhilash Nair, Jose Kizhakkkan, Athul John, Joseph Manikkal and Mariyakkutty are in supporting roles. The film is produced by Raj Rachakonda and Anurag Kashyap. The film premiered at the 2021 Toronto International Film Festival in Discovery Section. It is also selected in the Red Sea International Film Festival as Part of Competition section- 2021.

== Premise ==
A couple in patriarchal rural Kerala decides to put an end to the cycle of vengeance by the banks of a river that has more blood in it than water. The bloodthirsty river bears witness to everything.

== Production and release ==
The principal photography of the film was completed in February 2021 and post production works has done in the time of Covid -19 pandemic. The film got selected and premiered at the 2021 Toronto International Film Festival (TIFF) in Discovery Section.

== Cast ==
- Basil Paulose as Johnny
- Vinitha Koshy as Anna
- Nithin George as Joey
- Athul John as Paachi
- Jose Kizhakkkan as Kocheppu
- Abhilash Nair as Thankan
- Joseph Manikkal as Varkey
- Mariyakkutty as Grandmother
- Jose Ashariyott as Swimmer Jose
