= The Tambour of Retribution =

2020 film

- Poster
- Directed by: Abdulaziz Alshlahei
- Starring: Adwa Fahad
- Release date: 3 December 2020 (Cairo)
- Running time: 92 minutes
- Country: Saudi Arabia
- Language: Arabic

The Tambour of Retribution (Arabic: حد الطار, romanized: ḥad aṭ-ṭār) is a 2020 Saudi Arabian drama film directed by Abdulaziz Alshlahei. It was selected as the Saudi Arabian entry for the Best International Feature Film at the 94th Academy Awards.

== Cast ==
- Adwa Fahad
- Rawya Ahmed

== See also ==
- List of submissions to the 94th Academy Awards for Best International Feature Film
- List of Saudi Arabian submissions for the Academy Award for Best International Feature Film
