= The Perfect Candidate =

2019 film

- Theatrical release poster
- Directed by: Haifaa al-Mansour
- Written by: Haifaa Al Mansour; Brad Niemann
- Produced by: Haifaa Al Mansour; Gerhard Meixner; Roman Paul
- Starring: Mila Alzahrani; Dhay; Nourah Al Alwad; Khalid Abduirhim
- Cinematography: Patrick Orth
- Edited by: Andreas Wodraschke
- Music by: Volker Bertelmann
- Production companies: Establishment for Audiovisual Media; Razor Film Produktion
- Distributed by: Music Box Films
- Release dates: 29 August 2019 (Venice); 6 March 2020 (Spain)
- Running time: 101 minutes
- Country: Saudi Arabia
- Language: Arabic
- Box office: $1.3 million

The Perfect Candidate (Arabic: المرشحة المثالية, romanized: al-muraššaḥa al-mithāliyya) is a 2019 Saudi Arabian drama film directed by Haifaa al-Mansour. It was selected to compete for the Golden Lion at the 76th Venice International Film Festival. It was also selected as the Saudi Arabian entry for the Best International Feature Film at the 92nd Academy Awards, but it was not nominated.

== Plot ==
A young female Saudi doctor's run for office in the local city elections forces her family and community to accept their town's first female candidate.

== Cast ==
- Mila Al Zahrani as Maryam
- Nora Al Awadh as Sara
- Dhay as Selma

== Reception ==
On review aggregator Rotten Tomatoes, the film holds an approval rating of 93% based on 83 reviews, with an average rating of 7.3/10. The website's critics consensus reads: "A message movie admirable for its subtlety as well as its execution, The Perfect Candidate faces oppression and powerfully advocates for change." On Metacritic, the film has a weighted average score of 71 out of 100, based on 20 critics, indicating "generally favorable reviews".

Writing for The Hollywood Reporter, Deborah Young called the film a "simplistic feminist tale with an irresistible heroine" and said: "The Perfect Candidate offers a candid view on Saudi Arabian society that will pique the curiosity of Western audiences."

== Awards ==
- Brian Award at the 76th Venice International Film Festival

== See also ==
- List of submissions to the 92nd Academy Awards for Best International Feature Film
- List of Saudi Arabian submissions for the Academy Award for Best International Feature Film
- Elections in Saudi Arabia
