= A Matter of Life and Death (2025 film) =

2025 Saudi Arabian film

- Theatrical release poster
- Arabic: مسألة حياة أو موت
- Directed by: Anas Ba-Tahaf
- Written by: Sarah Taibah
- Produced by: Anas Ba-Tahaf; Sara Alghabra; Gianluca Chakra; Mohamed Hefzzy; Ahmed Teama
- Starring: Yagoub Alfarhan; Sarah Taibah
- Cinematography: Shawn Pavlin
- Edited by: Anas Ba-Tahaf; Hisham Fadel
- Music by: Firas Abou Fakher
- Production companies: Front Row Productions; Film Clinic; Rotana Studios; Arabia Pictures Group
- Distributed by: Front Row Filmed Entertainment
- Release dates: 8 December 2025 (Red Sea); 25 June 2026 (Saudi Arabia)
- Running time: 115 minutes
- Country: Saudi Arabia
- Language: Arabic

A Matter of Life and Death (Arabic: مسألة حياة أو موت) is a 2025 Saudi Arabian romantic comedy film directed by Anas Ba-Tahaf. It stars Yaqoub Alfarhan and Sarah Taibah, who also wrote the screenplay.

The film premiered at the 2025 Red Sea International Film Festival on 8 December 2025. It was theatrically released in Saudi Arabia on 25 June 2026. It was also selected as the Saudi Arabian entry for the Best International Feature Film at the 99th Academy Awards.

== Cast ==
- Yagoub Alfarhan
- Sarah Taibah

== Production ==
The film was announced in December 2024, which included an announcement of its production studios, its director and cast, and Front Row Filmed Entertainment as responsible for its Middle East and North Africa distribution and global sales. Principal photography began in Jeddah, Saudi Arabia in January 2025.

== Reception ==
=== Critical response ===
Red Sea Film Festival Foundation CEO Faisal Baltyuor stated that the film, "represents the growing strength of Saudi women in cinema and the emergence of romance as a dynamic new genre in the Kingdom."

Deadline called A Matter of Life and Death "one of the quirkiest local romantic comedies to come out of Saudi Arabia since the lifting of its 35-year cinema ban in 2017."

== See also ==
- List of submissions to the 99th Academy Awards for Best International Feature Film
- List of Saudi Arabian submissions for the Academy Award for Best International Feature Film
