= Yunan (film) =

2025 film

- Festival release poster
- Directed by: Ameer Fakher Eldin
- Written by: Ameer Fakher Eldin
- Produced by: Dorothe Beinemeier; Jiries Copti; Tony Copti; Steffen Gerdes
- Starring: Georges Khabbaz; Sibel Kekilli; Ali Suliman; Hanna Schygulla; Tom Wlaschiha; Laura Sophia Landauer
- Cinematography: Ronald Plante
- Edited by: Ameer Fakher Eldin
- Music by: Suad Bushnaq
- Production companies: Red Balloon; Intramovies; Fresco Films; Microclimat Films
- Distributed by: Immer Gute Filme; MAD Distribution; Filmoption International
- Release date: 19 February 2025 (Berlinale)
- Running time: 125 minutes
- Countries: Germany; Canada; Italy; Palestine; Qatar; Jordan; Saudi Arabia
- Languages: Arabic; German

Yunan (Arabic: يونان) is a 2025 drama film written and directed by Ameer Fakher Eldin. The story follows an exiled Lebanese author, intending to end his life on a remote North Sea island, who finds unexpected hope and a renewed will to live through the compassion of the elderly woman who runs the island's hotel. An international co-production, the film was selected to compete for the Golden Bear at the 75th Berlin International Film Festival, where it had its premiere on 19 February.

== Synopsis ==
Munir, a Syrian writer living in exile in Germany, experiences writer's block and loneliness. Only through the Internet can he maintain contact with his sister and his mother, who is suffering from dementia but responds to Munir's wish to re-hear the story of an ill-fated shepherd and his wife. After a visit to his doctor offers no physical reasons for his shortness of breath, Munir travels by ferry to the sparsely inhabited island of Langeneß, one of the Halligan islands in the North Sea and asks to book a room for one night at a tourist inn run by an elderly, eccentric widow and her gruff, unfriendly son. After an initial rebuffal he is reluctantly given a room in a remote, uninhabited farmhouse. Munir has brought along a gun and struggles with the idea of committing suicide. Moved by Munir's quiet, polite demeanor, the widow begins to show him some hospitality.

Due to warnings of a heavy storm which is expected to flood much of the island, Munir is invited to relocate to the main guesthouse for the following night. He continues to have dreams of the shepherd and his solitary life in the hills (of a Middle Eastern country). Through his experiences of the island's natural beauty and harshness and the interactions with his hosts and a few of the island's residents, Munir's desire for life is slowly rekindled.

== Cast ==
- Georges Khabbaz as Munir
- Hanna Schygulla as Valeska, a widowed innkeeper
- Ali Suliman as a Syrian shepherd
- Sibel Kekilli as wife of the shepherd
- Tom Wlaschiha as Karl, son of the innkeeper
- Laura Sophia Landauer as Sarah

== Production ==
The film was developed in December 2021 as a part of a trilogy of Ameer Fakher Eldin's first 2021 film, The Stranger with working title as Nothing of Nothing Remains.

The film written, directed and edited by Ameer Fakher Eldin, is composed by Suad Bushnaq and photographed by Ronald Plante.

Principal photography was carried out by Ronald Plante, a Canadian cinematographer, and began on 2 October 2023 at locations in Hamburg, Germany, Schleswig-Holstein, and Apulia, Italy. Filming ended on 16 November 2023.

== Release ==
Yunan had its world premiere on 19 February 2025, as part of the 75th Berlin International Film Festival, in competition for the Golden Bear.

The film competed in the Young Cinema Competition (World) at the 49th Hong Kong International Film Festival for Firebird Awards on 18 April 2025.

The film featured at the 72nd Sydney Film Festival in the Features section on 11 June 2025. It was showcased in the 'Features Canada' section at the 2025 Cinéfest Sudbury International Film Festival on 17 September 2025.

It also competed in New Directors Competition at the São Paulo International Film Festival and had screening on 18 October 2025.

It competed in the Red Sea: Competition strand at the Red Sea International Film Festival and had screening on 7 December 2025.

== Accolades ==
Award	Date of ceremony	Category	Recipient	Result	Ref.
Berlin International Film Festival	23 February 2025	Golden Bear	Yunan	Nominated	
Hong Kong International Film Festival	21 April 2025	Young Cinema Competition (World), Firebird Award	Yunan	Nominated	
Hong Kong International Film Festival	21 April 2025	Best Actor (World), Firebird Award	Georges Khabbaz	Won	
Hong Kong International Film Festival	21 April 2025	Best Actress (World), Firebird Award	Hanna Schygulla	Won	
Arab Critics' Awards for European Films	20 October 2025	Best Film	Yunan	Won	
Asia Pacific Screen Awards	27 November 2025	Best Performance	Georges Khabbaz	Nominated	
Asia Pacific Screen Awards	27 November 2025	Best Cinematography	Ronald Plante	Nominated	
Red Sea International Film Festival	13 December 2025	Yusr Best Director	Ameer Fakher Eldin	Won	
Red Sea International Film Festival	13 December 2025	Yusr Best Actor	Georges Khabbaz	Won	
