= Barni (film) =

2025 debut feature film by Mohammed Sheikh

- Directed by: Mohammed Sheikh
- Written by: Mohammed Sheikh
- Produced by: Abdirahman Fiili
- Starring: Salma Ahmed; Hamse Mohamoud; Fuaad Hassan; Mouse Bille
- Cinematography: Rafael Mattar
- Edited by: Mohammed Sheikh
- Music by: Ryan Williams
- Production company: Aleel Films
- Distributed by: Aleel Films
- Release date: 2025
- Running time: 85 minutes

Barni is a 2025 debut feature film by Somali Minnesotan filmmaker Mohammed Sheikh. It premiered at the Red Sea International Film Festival, where it was selected for competition.

== Production ==
Sheikh moved to Minnesota in 2013 and founded Aleel Films in 2018, through which he made several short films about Somali people living in the Twin Cities. He originally wanted to make Barni in a small town in Minnesota but found that it wasn't possible; Sheikh's friends also informed him that shooting in Somalia itself wouldn't be possible either. Instead, he shot principal photography in Djibouti in January 2024. The cast was thus mostly residents in Djibouti who were ethnically Somali, with crew coming in from various countries across the world.

== Critical reception ==
Screen Daily called Barni a "modest production that serves as a showcase for new voices emerging in a resurgent Somali film industry," with some criticisms of the acting performances and pacing.
