= Cyril Aris =

Lebanese director

- Occupation: Director
- Years active: 2011–present
- Notable work: A Sad and Beautiful World

Cyril Aris is a Lebanese director. He has directed feature films like A Sad and Beautiful World, as well as feature documentaries such as Dancing on the Edge of a Volcano.

== Career ==
Prior to working in film, Aris was a management consultant. He began working as a director with the mini-series, Beirut, I Love You, which aired from 2011–2012. In 2018, he premiered his first feature documentary, The Swing, at the Karlovy Vary International Film Festival and won several awards.

Aris then worked on Mounia Akl's Costa Brava, Lebanon in 2021 and concurrently shot Dancing on the Edge of a Volcano, a documentary describing the process of shooting Akl's film amid the 2020 Beirut explosion. His documentary was supported by the Sundance Institute, selected for competition at Karlovy Vary where it received a jury special mention, and showed in over 80 festivals around the world.

Aris began writing the script for his debut feature, A Sad and Beautiful World, in 2019, based on his experiences of growing up and living in Lebanon; in it, Akl starred as the character Yasmina. In 2025, it was entered into competition at the Red Sea International Film Festival and chosen as Lebanon's entry for the Academy Award for Best International Feature Film. It also won the Audience Award at the Venice Days Sidebar of Venice Film Festival in addition to playing at other film festivals around the world.
