= Mamdouh Salem Baajajah =

Saudi film director

- ممدوح سالم باعجاجه
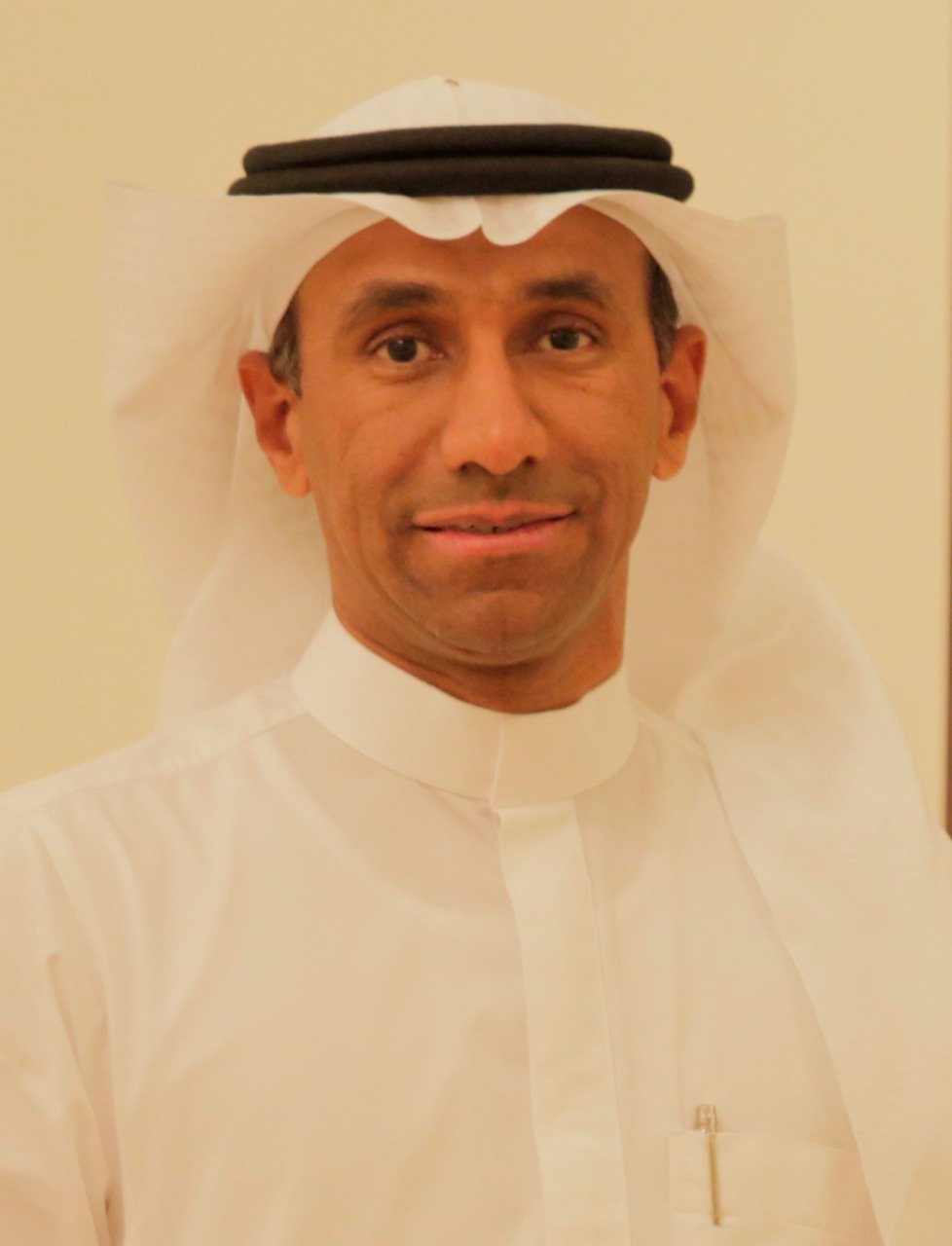
- Born: Jeddah, Saudi Arabia
- Occupations: Film director, producer, actor
- Organization: Rowad Media

Mamdouh Salem Baajajah (Arabic: ممدوح سالم باعجاجه), generally known in English as Mamdouh Salem, is a Saudi film director, producer, and actor. He has been active in the arts world since 1995, after joining the King Abdulaziz University theatre as a stage actor. He is known for founding the Jeddah Visual Film Festival in 2006, considered the first film festival in Saudi Arabia, and for leading the production company Rowad Media, which has supported film and cultural initiatives in the Kingdom.

== Early life and education ==
Mamdouh Salem Baajajah, generally known in English as Mamdouh Salem, was born in Saudi Arabia.

Salem earned a bachelor's degree in computer science from King Abdulaziz University in Jeddah and a master's degree in quality management from the Arab Academy for Science, Technology and Maritime Transport in Alexandria, Egypt.

He later joined the Saudi Arabian Society for Culture and Arts, where he studied theatrical arts.

== Career ==
Salem began his artistic career in 1995 at the King Abdulaziz University Theatre as a stage actor. His early television work includes Conflict in Extra Time, aired in 1998.

In 2000, he founded the Rowad Comprehensive Theater Troupe, which specialized in children's theatre and evolved into the production company Rowad Media in 2005.

Through Rowad Media, Salem has produced films, television programs, and stage works, and organized cultural events such as the Souq Okaz Festival and the International Comedy Festival. He has also conducted film and theatre workshops in collaboration with international cultural organizations including the British Council.

Salem contributed to the early institutionalization of Saudi filmmaking, helping to organize training programs and public film events before the formal establishment of a national cinema sector. He founded the Jeddah Visual Film Festival in 2006, which is considered to be the Kingdom's first organized film festival.

He has been a key figure in shaping the industry in Saudi Arabia, with Rowad Media, supporting film and cultural initiatives in the Kingdom, and Salem regularly appearing at film festivals.

== Other activities ==
Salem has served as a jury member for several regional and international film festivals.

== Recognition ==
In 2016, the Arab Cinema Center listed Salem among the 100 most influential figures in the Arab film industry.

In 2025, Salem was a guest of honor at the Medenine International Film Festival.

== Selected filmography ==
Year	Title	Role	Notes
2007	Laylat Al-Badr (Full Moon Night)	Writer, director, producer	Documentary short
2008	Belonging	Director	
2010	Jeddah: Crossroads of Cultures	Writer, director, producer	
2013	Child Task	Writer, director, producer	
2014	Saqr Al-Jazeera (Falcon of the Island)	Writer, director, producer	
2024	Dar Al-Banat (Girls' House)	Director	
2025	The Cradle	Director	

== Selected plays ==
Year	Title	Role	Notes
2011	Made in Saudi	Producer, director	
2015	Hawazin Engraving	Producer, director	
2015	The Brave of His Tribe	Director	
2016	Me, Him and Him	Director	
2016	Abs and Dhubyan	Producer, director	
2018	Super Cute	Producer	
2018	Souq Al-Arab	Producer, director	
2025	Ghosts	Writer, director	
