= Beatrice Baldacci =

Italian screenwriter and filmmaker

Beatrice Baldacci (born 1993) is an Italian screenwriter and filmmaker.

== Biography ==
Baldacci was born in Città di Castello. She studied psychology at the University of Padua before moving to Rome to study film at the Rome University of Fine Arts where she studied under filmmakers Daniele Ciprì and Claudio Cupellini. She made her first short film, Corvus Corax, in 2017. The film was screened at numerous festivals and won several awards. She graduated in 2017, having wrote her thesis on anthropomorphisation in cinema.

In 2019, she won the Zavattini Prize for her autobiographical short film Supereroi senza Superpoteri. The film, entirely put together from VHS footage, premiered at the 76th Venice International Film Festival in 2019, at the Orizzonti section, where it won a FEDIC Special Mention for best short film.

In 2021, Baldacci directed her first feature film La Tana (The Den). It premiered at the 78th Venice International Film Festival and won a Raffaella Fioretta Award at the Alice nella Città section of the 16th Rome Film Festival.

== Filmography ==
Short Films

- 2017: Corvus Corax
- 2019: Supereroi senza Superpoteri (Superheroes without Superpowers)

Feature Films

- 2021: La Tana (The Den)
