= Truck Mama =

2025 Kenyan documentary

- Directed by: Zipporah Nyaruri
- Written by: Phil Jandaly, Ricardo Acosta
- Produced by: Zipporah Nyaruri, Portia Cele
- Starring: Evaline Wambua Mutuku
- Release date: 2025 (Red Sea International Film Festival)
- Running time: 85 minutes
- Countries: Kenya, South Africa, Saudi Arabia, Netherlands
- Languages: Swahili, English, Kikamba

Truck Mama is a 2025 documentary directed by Zipporah Nyaruri. The film follows Eva (Evaline Wambua Mutuku), a single mother and long-haul truck driver in Kenya, as she navigates dangerous roads and a male-dominated profession. The documentary had its world premiere at the 2025 International Documentary Film Festival Amsterdam, its international premiere in-competition at the 2025 Red Sea International Film Festival where it was the only documentary in-competition and was the opening film of the 2026 Encounters South African International Documentary Festival.

A co-production between Kenya, South Africa, Saudi Arabia, and the Netherlands, the film is in Swahili, English, and Kikamba. It is also Nyaruri's first feature-length project.

== Synopsis ==
Eva is a single mother of two who works as a long-haul truck driver in Kenya. The film depicts her two-week journey from Kenya for Sudan, interweaving her professional life on the road with her personal struggles, including caring for her children.

Along the way, she faces challenges like border guards, delays, breakdowns and dangerous security situations, but also shows resilience, humour and resourcefulness. The documentary includes observational scenes of Eva's personal and work life featuring conversations with her family and fellow truck drivers.

== Production ==
Director Zippy Nyaruri began working on the film in 2011 through the Lola Kenya Screen film forum. She heard about woman truck drivers in Kenya and sought to find one. After a long search, she finally met the film's subject, Evaline Wambua Mutuku ("Eva"), in Mombasa, who was then pregnant and thinking of quitting driving. The film's production started two years after meeting Eva and was initially funded by Docubox while Nyaruri was living in Kenya. Through co-producer Portia Cele (who Nyaruri met at the Durban Film Mart), the film secured production funds from South Africa's National Film and Video Foundation. The Red Sea Fund supported post-production. The films also received support from the IDFA Forum and the Hot Docs-Blue Ice Docs Fund.

== Release ==
The film had its world premiere at the International Documentary Film Festival Amsterdam (IDFA) in 2025 and its international premiere in the Red Sea Competition Category at the 2025 Red Sea International Film Festival in Jeddah, Saudi Arabia.

== Reception ==
Critical reviews generally praise the film for tackling taboos and offering and inspiring portrait of a single mother in a male-dominated profession. Bassirou Niang of "Africine" praised the film for portraying a "determined" woman who fights for dignity and "shapes the image of a courageous mother". David Sánchez of "Te Gusta Mucho El Cine" described the documentary as a journey of resistance, humor and learning and commended its intimate access to Eva's life.
