= Allah Is Not Obliged =

2025 animated film

- Directed by: Zaven Najjar
- Written by: Ahmadou Kourouma; Karine Winczura
- Produced by: Sébastien Onomo; Paul Thiltges
- Starring: Marc Zinga; Chris Aboubacar; Hanta Traoré
- Edited by: Isabelle Manquillet
- Music by: Thibault Agyeman
- Production companies: Creative Touch Studios; Paul Thiltges Distribution; Need Production; Lunamine; Yzanakio; GKIDS
- Distributed by: BAC Films; Maison 4 Tiers
- Release date: 2025
- Running time: 77 minutes
- Countries: France, Luxembourg, Belgium, Canada

Allah Is Not Obliged is a 2025 animated film directed by Zaven Najjar adapted from a book of the same name written by Ahmadou Kourouma. It appeared in several film festivals, including the Red Sea International Film Festival, the Annecy International Animation Film Festival, and the Tokyo International Film Festival.

== Plot ==
The film follows Birahima, a ten-year-old Guinean orphan, as he tries to meet his aunt in Liberia. Along the way, he falls into the throes of tribal warfare and is recruited to be a child soldier.

== Production ==
In addition to adapting Kourouma's novel, Najjar also spoke with Liberian war veterans. In particular, he spoke with a former general of the Liberians United for Reconciliation and Democracy, who put him in contact with other veterans, brought him to several locations discussed in Kourouma's novel, and ultimately showed him a local perspective of Monrovia. During his travels, Najjar made sketches, began storyboarding the film.

"For budget reasons," the film was created by five animation studios.

== Critical reception ==
Cineuropa wrote that "this impressive and very well mastered debut feature about a childhood sucked into the madness of war... elevates animation that isn’t afraid to tackle topics that are seemingly difficult but essential to pass on."
