= Beirut I Love You =

Beirut I Love You is a Lebanese television/web-series which aired on the Lebanese Broadcasting Corporation (LBC). The series stars Mounia Akl and Cyril Aris, both of whom developed the show.

== Concept ==
The series follows several people in their 20s living in Beirut as they attempt to balance work, love, and life.

== Production ==
Beirut I Love You is produced by Orange Dog Productions and shoot on location in Beirut, Lebanon. The LBC ordered 35 episodes of the show.

Following season two, it was announced that the show would be put on hiatus while Mounia and Cyril completed Masters of Fine Arts in Directing/Screenwriting at Columbia University in New York.
