= The Stranger (2021 film) =

2021 film

- Directed by: Ameer Fakher Eldin
- Written by: Ameer Fakher Eldin
- Produced by: Jiries Copti; Tony Copti
- Starring: Ashraf Barhom
- Cinematography: Niklas Lindschau
- Edited by: Ameer Fakher Eldin
- Music by: Rami Nakhleh
- Production companies: Fresco Films; Red Balloon
- Release date: 6 September 2021 (Venice)
- Running time: 112 minutes
- Country: Palestine
- Language: Palestinian Arabic

The Stranger (Arabic: الغريب, romanized: al-Gharīb) is a 2021 Palestinian drama film directed by Ameer Fakher Eldin. It was selected as the Palestinian entry for the Best International Feature Film at the 94th Academy Awards.

== Synopsis ==
In the occupied Golan Heights, a former doctor experiences an existential crisis before meeting a mysterious soldier.

== Cast ==
- Ashraf Barhom as Adnan
- Mohammad Bakri as Abu Adnan

== See also ==
- List of submissions to the 94th Academy Awards for Best International Feature Film
- List of Palestinian submissions for the Academy Award for Best International Feature Film
