= Nighttime Sounds =

2025 film by Zhang Zhongchen

- Directed by: Zhang Zhongchen
- Written by: Zhang Zhongchen; Li Zhigang
- Produced by: Chen Kunyang
- Starring: Chen Halin; Li Yanxi; Gu Hanru
- Cinematography: Chang Reagon
- Edited by: Zhang Zhongchen; Huang Bingjie
- Music by: Chen Retoy
- Production company: Beijing San Yue Culture Media Co.
- Distributed by: HKIFF Collection
- Release date: 2025
- Running time: 88 minutes
- Language: Mandarin

Nighttime Sounds (你的眼睛比太阳明亮, Nǐ de yǎnjīng bǐ tàiyáng míngliàng, lit. Your eyes are brighter than the sun) is a 2025 film by Chinese director Zhang Zhongchen. It premiered at the San Sebastián International Film Festival in September 2025.

== Synopsis ==
The film is set in Maozhuang Village and follows a girl named Qing and her mother. One day, Qing meets a pale boy looking for his own lost mother, after which the two set out trying to find her.

== Critical reception ==
For Nighttime Sounds, Zhang won a best director award in the Fei Mu, or emerging filmmakers category, of the Pingyao International Film Festival.

The Film Verdict called the film an "engrossing magical realist tale from the Chinese hinterlands" with "An arty, expressive mix of social realism and the metaphysical."

Screendaily called the film a "Confident, lyrical drama."
