= Lost Land (film) =

2025 Japanese drama film

- International promotional poster
- Rohingya: Harà Watan
- Directed by: Akio Fujimoto
- Written by: Akio Fujimoto
- Produced by: Kazutaka Watanabe; Angèle de Lorme; Sujauddin Karimuddin; Elise Shick; Christian Jilka
- Starring: Shomira Rias; Uddin Muhammad; Shofik Rias Uddin
- Cinematography: Yoshio Kitagawa
- Music by: Ernst Reijseger
- Production companies: Cinemata; Cineric Creative; Dongyu Club; E.x.N K.K.; Elom Initiatives; KinemaTowards; Panorama Films; Scarlet Visions
- Distributed by: Arizona Distribution (France)
- Release dates: 1 September 2025 (Venice); 25 March 2026 (France)
- Running time: 99 minutes
- Countries: Japan; France; Malaysia; Germany
- Languages: Rohingya; Malay

Lost Land (Rohingya: Harà Watan) is 2025 drama film written and directed by Akio Fujimoto. It follows four-year-old Shafi and his nine-year-old sister Somira, Rohingya refugees, who embark on a perilous journey from a refugee camp in Bangladesh to Malaysia to reunite with their family.

The film had its world premiere at the Orizzonti section of 82nd Venice International Film Festival on 1 September 2025, where it won the Special Jury Prize.

== Cast ==
- Shomira Rias as Somira
- Uddin Muhammad
- Shofik Rias Uddin as Shafi

== Production ==
The film was made in the Rohingya language and includes over 200 Rohingya people, with a brother and sister in the main roles. Many of them had lived through experiences like the ones shown in the film, even though they are not professional actors.

In October 2024, the film won The LAVAlabs Moving Images Award for €10,000 worth of visual effects at seventh edition of European Work in Progress Cologne.

== Release ==
Lost Land premiered on September 1, 2025, in the Orizzonti program of the 82nd Venice International Film Festival. It competed at the International Film Festival War on Screen on October 10, 2025.

It was also screened on October 13, 2025 at the Bangkok International Film Festival in the Main Competition, and in International Perspective at the São Paulo International Film Festival on 19 October 2025.

The film had its Japanese Premiere at the 38th Tokyo International Film Festival on October 30, 2025 in Nippon Cinema Now.

It was screened in Open Horizons section at the Thessaloniki International Film Festival on 30 October 2025, and had its Singapore Premiere in the Standpoint of the 36th Singapore International Film Festival on 29 November 2025.

The film competed in the 20th Jogja-NETPAC Asian Film Festival on 30 November 2025 and then in the Red Sea: Competition strand at the Red Sea International Film Festival and had screening on 10 December 2025. It won the Best Film award (Golden Yusr Best Feature Film) at the festival.

In February 2026, it will be presented for its United States premiere in the feature films section of the 41st Santa Barbara International Film Festival.

The world sales rights of the film were acquired by Rediance Films.

The film is scheduled for release in the French theaters on March 25, 2026 by Arizona Distribution.

== Reception ==
David Katz’s of Cineuropa reviewing at Venice International Film Festival praised the film for its emotional depth and storytelling. He highlighted the use of "on-screen chapter headings written in child-like handwriting" that track the children’s perilous journey, capturing both their vulnerability and resilience. Katz commended the director's subtle exposition through adult characters, which naturally revealed the geopolitical backdrop.

Cinematographer Yoshio Kitagawa received special praise for creating a film-like analogue aesthetic digitally, with "camera mobility and judicious image grain" reminiscent of 16 mm film. Katz concluded that "Despite potential audience fatigue with refugee narratives," the film earned "academic credence" for its portrayal of the Rohingya experience, while also offering "hard-won lyricism from its tale of young souls seeking salvation."

== Accolades ==
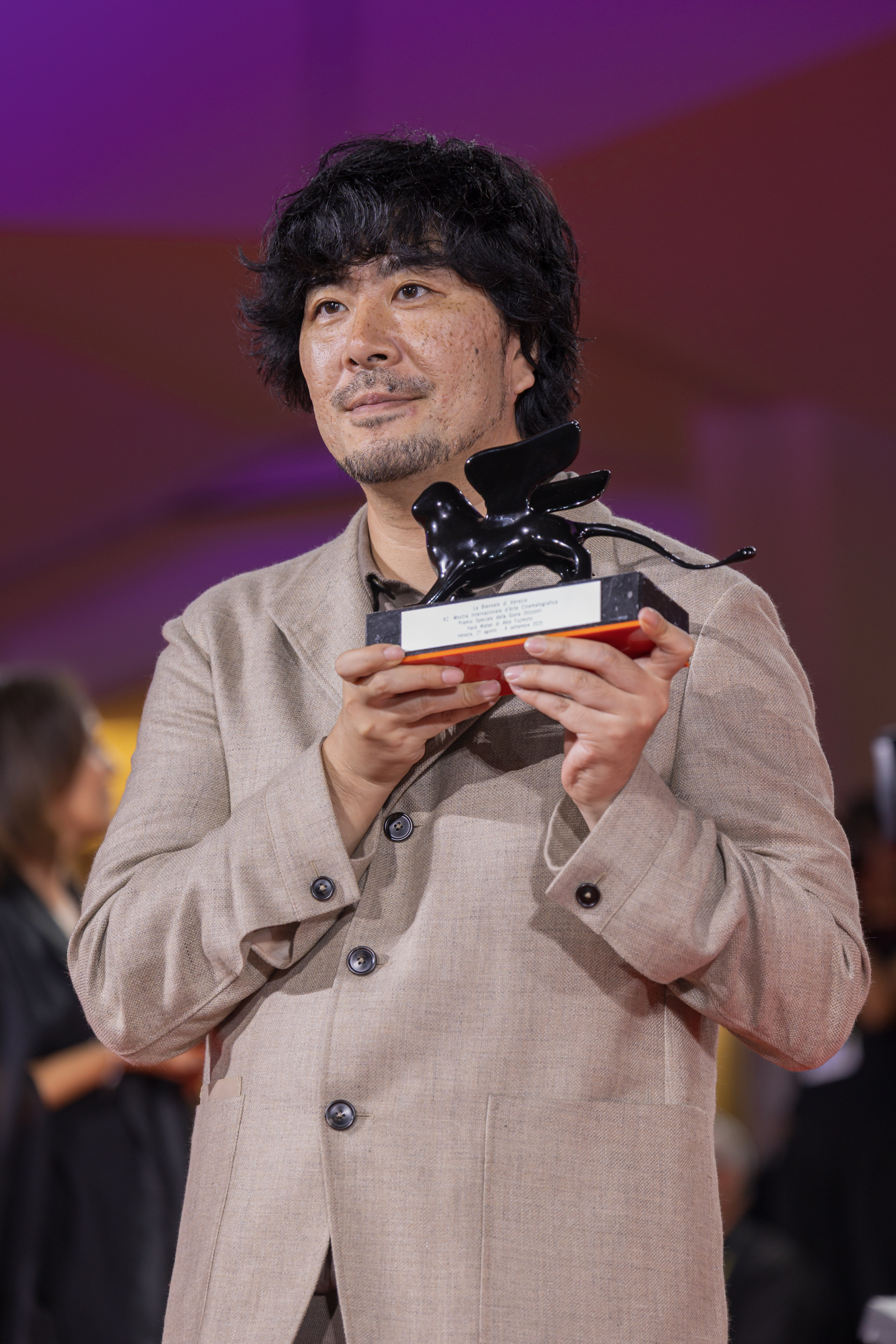
2025's Special Jury Prize winner: Akio Fujimoto for Lost Land

Award	Date	Category	Recipient(s)	Result	Ref.
Venice International Film Festival	6 September 2025	Orizzonti: Special Jury Prize	Lost Land	Won	
Pingyao International Film Festival	30 September 2025	Roberto Rossellini Award	Lost Land	Nominated	
Pingyao International Film Festival	30 September 2025	Crouching Tigers - Best Film	Lost Land	Nominated	
Asia Pacific Screen Awards	27 November 2025	Best Director	Akio Fujimoto	Nominated	
Asia Pacific Screen Awards	27 November 2025	Jury Grand Prize	Akio Fujimoto and Kazutaka Watanabe	Won	
Red Sea International Film Festival	13 December 2025	Golden Yusr Best Feature Film	Lost Land	Won	
