= Nithin Lukose =

Indian film director and sound designer

Nithin Lukose നിതിൻ ലൂക്കോസ്
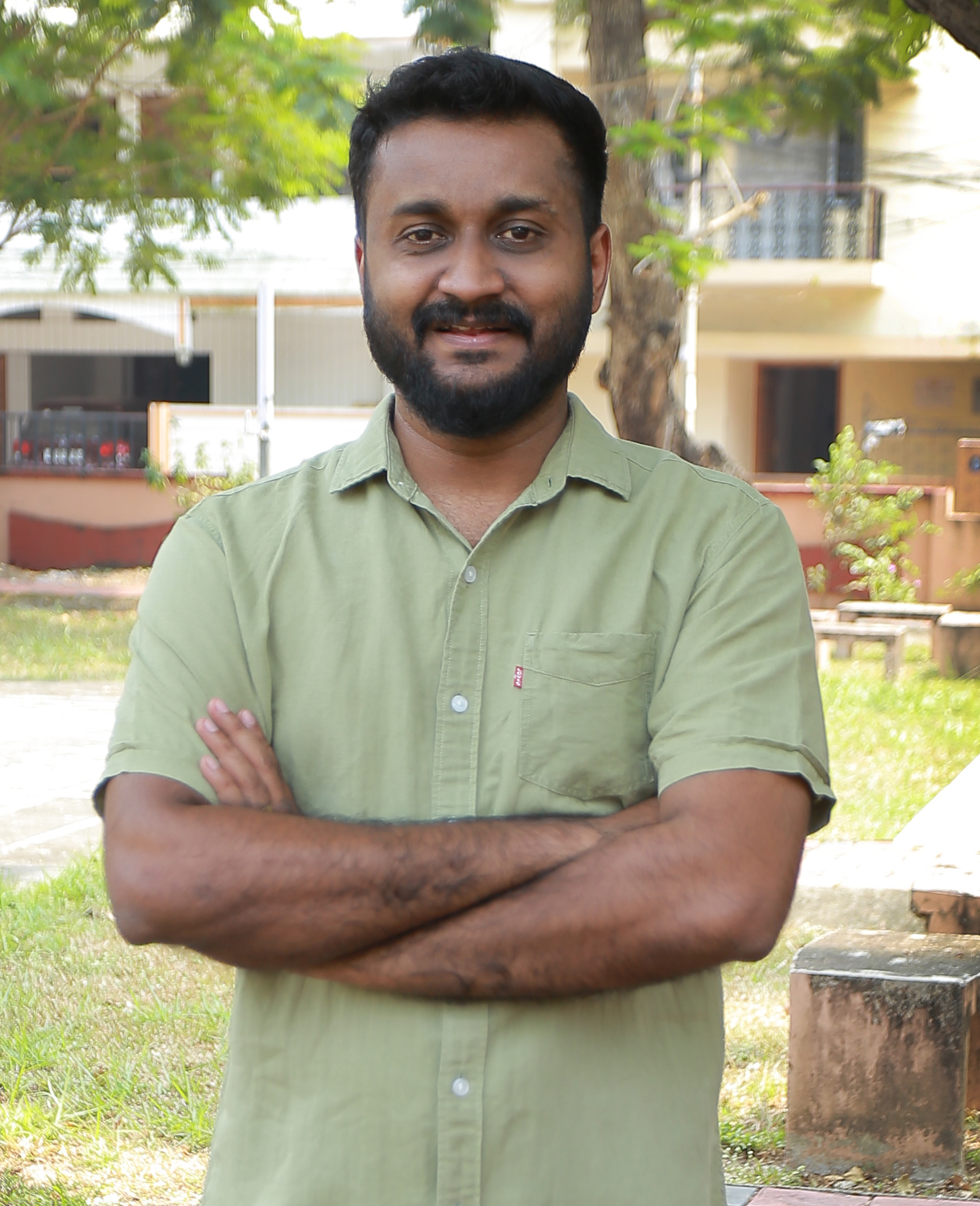
- Born: Wayanad, Kerala, India
- Education: Film and Television Institute of India, Pune in 2014
- Occupations: Film Director, Sound editor, Sound designer, writer
- Years active: 2015–present
- Parent(s): Lukose V.C & Elsy N.D

Nithin Lukose (born 4 May 1987 in Wayanad) is an Indian film director, writer and sound designer known for his works in Malayalam, Hindi, Kannada and Telugu films. Nithin Lukose is a graduate at the Film and Television Institute of India, Pune. He has been a part of many films. PAKA (River of Blood) is his debut feature film as director. The film was premiered at Toronto international Film festival (TIFF). As a sound designer of Thithi, won Golden Leopard - Filmmakers of the Present, Recently completed Sandeep Aur Pinky Faraar with director Dibakar Banerjee as the sound designer. Production sound mixer for Hollywood directors like Bennet Miller and Julie Taymor when they shot their documentary and film in India.

== Filmography ==
Year	Film	Language	Role	Director	Awards and Film festivals	
2024	The Fable	Hindi, English	Sound Designer	Raam Reddy	2024	MAMI Mumbai Film Festival 2024; International Film Festival of Kerala; SEMINCI film festival; Leeds International Film Festival; Festival des 3 Continents -Nantes; Singapore International Film Festival
2024	The Fable	Hindi, English	Sound Designer	Raam Reddy	2023	74th Berlin International Film Festival
2021	PAKA (River of Blood)	Malayalam	Writer, Director	Himself	2022	Palm Springs International Film Festival; Santa Barbara International Film Festival; Mumbai International Film Festival; London Indian Film Festival; International Film Festival of Los Angeles; International Film Festival Stuttgart; International Film Festival of Melbourne; New Voices/New Visions Grand Jury Prize [Nominee] at Palm Springs International Film Festival; Spotlight [Nominee] for Best Film at Mumbai International Film Festival; IFF Award [Nominee] for Best Film at Indian Film Festival Of Melbourne; People's Choice Award [Nominee]; Director's Vison Award at International Film Festival Stuttgart
2021	PAKA (River of Blood)	Malayalam	Writer, Director	Himself	2021	Gala-Best Film at Pingyao Crouching Tiger Hidden Dragon International Film Festival; Toronto International Film Festival; Red Sea International Film Festival
2021	PAKA (River of Blood)	Malayalam	Writer, Director	Himself	2020	NFDC Work in Progress lab; Best picture and Prasad Lav D.I award at NFDC W.I.P lab; Toronto international Film festival (TIFF) (Premier) in the discovery session
2020	The Glorias	English	As sound mixer – Indian schedule	Julie Taymor		
2019	Sandeep Aur Pinky Faraar	Hindi	As sound design/Sound Mixer	Dibakar Banerjee		
2019	Mallesham	Telugu	As sound designer	Raj R		
2019	Ambili	Malayalam	As sound designer	Johnpaul George		
2019	Bhinna	Kannada	As sound designer	Adarsh Eshwarappa		
2018	Arishdvarga	Kannada	As sound designer	Arvind Kamath		
2018	Ayogya	Kannada	As sound designer	S. Mahesh Kumar		
2018	Chambal	Kannada	As sound designer	Jacob Verghese		
2017	Bada Naam Karega	Hindi	As sound designer	Shavya Goel		
2017	Randuper	Malayalam	As sound designer	Prem Shankar		
2017	Ayana	Kannada	As sound designer	Gangadhar Salimath		
2017	Shuddhi	Kannada	As sound designer	Adarsh Eshwarappa		
2017	Ayaal Sassi	Malayalam	As sound designer	Sajin Baabu		
2016	Thimphu	Bhutan feature film	As sound designer	Chand Rai		
2016	Thooppu	Malayalam	As sound designer	Sandeep Adhikari		
2015	Thithi	Kannada	sync sound and sound design	Raam Reddy		National Film Award for Best Feature Film in Kannada at 63rd National Film Awards
