= Hijra (film) =

2025 Saudi Arabian film

- International promotional poster
- Arabic: هجرة
- Directed by: Shahad Ameen
- Written by: Shahad Ameen
- Produced by: Mohamed Jabarah Al-Daradji; Faisal Baltyuor
- Starring: Lamar Faden; Khairiah Nathmy; Nawaf Al-Dhufairy
- Cinematography: Miguel I. Littin-Menz
- Edited by: Hervé de Luze; Mohamed Jabarah Al-daradji
- Music by: Armand Amar
- Production companies: Bite Ameen; Film Clinic; Human Fil; Ideation Studios; Iraqi Independent Film Center; Member of ART and The Red Sea Fund
- Distributed by: Film Clinic Indie Distribution
- Release date: 28 August 2025 (Venice)
- Running time: 115 minutes
- Countries: Saudi Arabia; Iraq; Egypt; United Kingdom
- Languages: Arabic; Urdu; Turkish; English

Hijra (Arabic: هجرة) is a 2025 adventure drama film written and directed by Shahad Ameen.

== Plot ==
The film follows Saudi grandmother Sitti (Khayriya Nazmi) traveling from Taif to Mecca to perform Hajj with her two granddaughters Janna (Lamar Faden) and Sarah. When suddenly the eldest Sarah goes missing, she travels from southern Saudi Arabia to its northern borders in search of her.

== Cast ==
- Lamar Faden as Janna
- Khayriya Nazmi as Sitti
- Nawaf Al Dhufairi as Ahmed

== Production ==
The film was developed over three years by the director Shahad Ameen with Iraqi filmmaker Mohamed Al-Daradji, who is one of the producers. The film was shot in a large desert and in many Saudi Arabian cities and urban areas including Jeddah, Medina, AlUla and Neom in 2024.

== Release ==
Hijra had its world premiere at the 82nd Venice International Film Festival at the Venice Spotlight section. It competed in Stockholm Competition section of the 2025 Stockholm International Film Festival on 6 November 2025 vying for the Bronze Horse. It was selected as the Saudi Arabian entry for the Best International Feature Film at the 98th Academy Awards, but it was not nominated.

It competed in the Red Sea: Competition strand at the Red Sea International Film Festival and had screening on 6 December 2025.

The film competed in the Awards Buzz – Best International Feature Film section of the 37th Palm Springs International Film Festival and have its North American Premiere on 2 January 2026.

Creative Artists Agency (CAA) has North American sales rights of the film, acquired in May 2024.

== Accolades ==
Award	Date	Category	Recipient	Result	Ref.
Venice International Film Festival	6 September 2025	Audience Award (Venice Spotlight)	Hijra	Nominated	
Venice International Film Festival	6 September 2025	NETPAC Award for Best Asian Film	Hijra	Won	
Stockholm International Film Festival	16 November 2025	Bronze Horse	Hijra	Nominated	
Asia Pacific Screen Awards	27 November 2025	Best Performance	Khayriya Nazmi	Nominated	
Red Sea International Film Festival	13 December 2025	Yusr Jury Prize	Hijra	Won	
Red Sea International Film Festival	13 December 2025	AlUla Audience Award	Hijra	Won	

== See also ==
- List of submissions to the 98th Academy Awards for Best International Feature Film
- List of Saudi Arabian submissions for the Academy Award for Best International Feature Film
