= Unidentified (2025 film) =

Saudi drama film

- American theatrical release poster
- Directed by: Haifaa al-Mansour
- Written by: Haifaa al-Mansour; Brad Niemann
- Produced by: Brad Niemann; Haifaa al-Mansour
- Starring: Mila al-Zahrani; Shafi al-Harthi
- Cinematography: Monty Rowan
- Edited by: Rafael Nur; Steve Cohen
- Music by: Amelia Warner; Sam Thompson
- Production companies: Rotana Studios; Al Mansour Establishment
- Distributed by: Sony Pictures Classics
- Release dates: September 5, 2025 (TIFF); June 19, 2026 (United States)
- Running time: 99 minutes
- Country: Saudi Arabia
- Language: Arabic
- Box office: $45,319

Unidentified is a 2025 Saudi thriller film directed by Haifaa al-Mansour and co-written by al-Mansour and Brad Niemann. The film was released in the United States theaters on June 19, 2026.

== Premise ==
A true-crime aficionado who recently lost a child of her own, resolves to identify the body of a teenage girl found in the desert outside a small town.

== Cast ==
- Mila Al Zahrani as Nawal Al Saffan
- Shafi Al Harthi as Colonel Majid
- Aziz Gharbawi as Ali
- Othoub Sharar as Joud
- Adwa Al Asiri
- Abdullah Al Qahtani as Mishal Abdul Rehman

== Production ==
The film is written and directed by Haifaa al-Mansour, and produced by al-Mansour and Brad Niemann, who also co-wrote the film. It is an Al Mansour Establishment production, made in association with Rotana Studios, with support from the Daw Program through the Film Commission, KSA. Principal photography took place in Saudi Arabia in 2024. The cast is led by Mila Al Zahrani and Shafi Al Harthi. The film was in post-production in February 2025.

In February 2025, Sony Pictures Classics acquired distribution rights to the film for North and Latin America, Eastern Europe, Turkey, Australia, New Zealand and worldwide airlines.

== Release ==
Unidentified had its world premiere on September 5, 2025, at the 2025 Toronto International Film Festival in the Centrepiece section.
