= A Sad and Beautiful World =

2025 Lebanese film

- International teaser poster
- Arabic: نجوم الأمل والألم
- Literally: Stars of hope and pain
- Directed by: Cyril Aris
- Screenplay by: Cyril Aris; Bane Fakih
- Produced by: Georges Schoucair; Jennifer Goyne Blake; April Shih; Georg Neubert; Jasper Wiedhöft
- Starring: Mounia Akl; Hasan Akil; Julia Kassar
- Cinematography: Joe Saade
- Edited by: Cyril Aris; Nat Sanders
- Music by: Anthony Sahyoun
- Production companies: Reynard Films; Abbout Productions; Diversity Hire; Sunnyland Film; The Red Sea Fund; Giant Leap Media
- Distributed by: Paradise City
- Release date: 31 August 2025 (Venice)
- Running time: 110 minutes
- Countries: Lebanon; United States; Germany; Saudi Arabia; Qatar
- Language: Arabic
- Box office: $280,176

A Sad and Beautiful World (Arabic: نجوم الأمل والألم) is a 2025 Arabic-language romantic comedy-drama film co-written and directed by Cyril Aris, in his first feature debut. Set in Beirut, it follows childhood sweethearts Nino (Hasan Akil) and Yasmina (Mounia Akl), who had lost sight of one another, reuniting in their 20s against the backdrop of political turmoil and social collapse in present-day Lebanon.

The film had its world premiere at the Giornate degli Autori sidebar section during the 82nd Venice International Film Festival on 31 August 2025, where it shared the section's People's Choice Award. It was selected as the Lebanese entry for the Best International Feature Film at the 98th Academy Awards, but it was not nominated.

== Cast ==
- Mounia Akl as Yasmina
- Hasan Akil as Nino
- Julia Kassar as Oumaya
- Camille Salameh as Antoine
- Tino Karam as Chafic
- Anthony Karam
- Nadyn Chalhoub as Leila

== Production ==
In October 2021 the film was selected for the Cinemed Development Grant at the 31st instalment of the Montpellier Film Festival. It won the main grant at the Cinemed on 21 October 2021. In November 2021, the film project was selected for the European Coproduction Forum.

In October 2024, the film was selected for the Atlas Workshops at the Marrakech International Film Festival. Jeff Nichols, American film director and screenwriter mentored the directors at Atlas Workshops + Project Line-Up. It also won €10,000 Atlas Post-production Prizes at the Atlas Workshops in December 2024.

The filming began in 2024 and continued till early summer.

The film marks Cyril Aris's debut as a fiction feature director. It also marks the return of Lebanese actress, screenwriter, and director Mounia Akl to the big screen. Produced by Abbout Productions, Diversity Hire, and Reynard Productions, the project is co-produced with Sunnyland Film—an ART member, and The Red Sea Fund, an initiative of the Red Sea International Film Festival. Additional support came from Fonds Image de la Francophonie, the Doha Film Institute, Visions Sud Est with backing from the Swiss Agency for Development and Cooperation, the Atlas Workshops, and the Lebanese Film Fund.

== Release ==
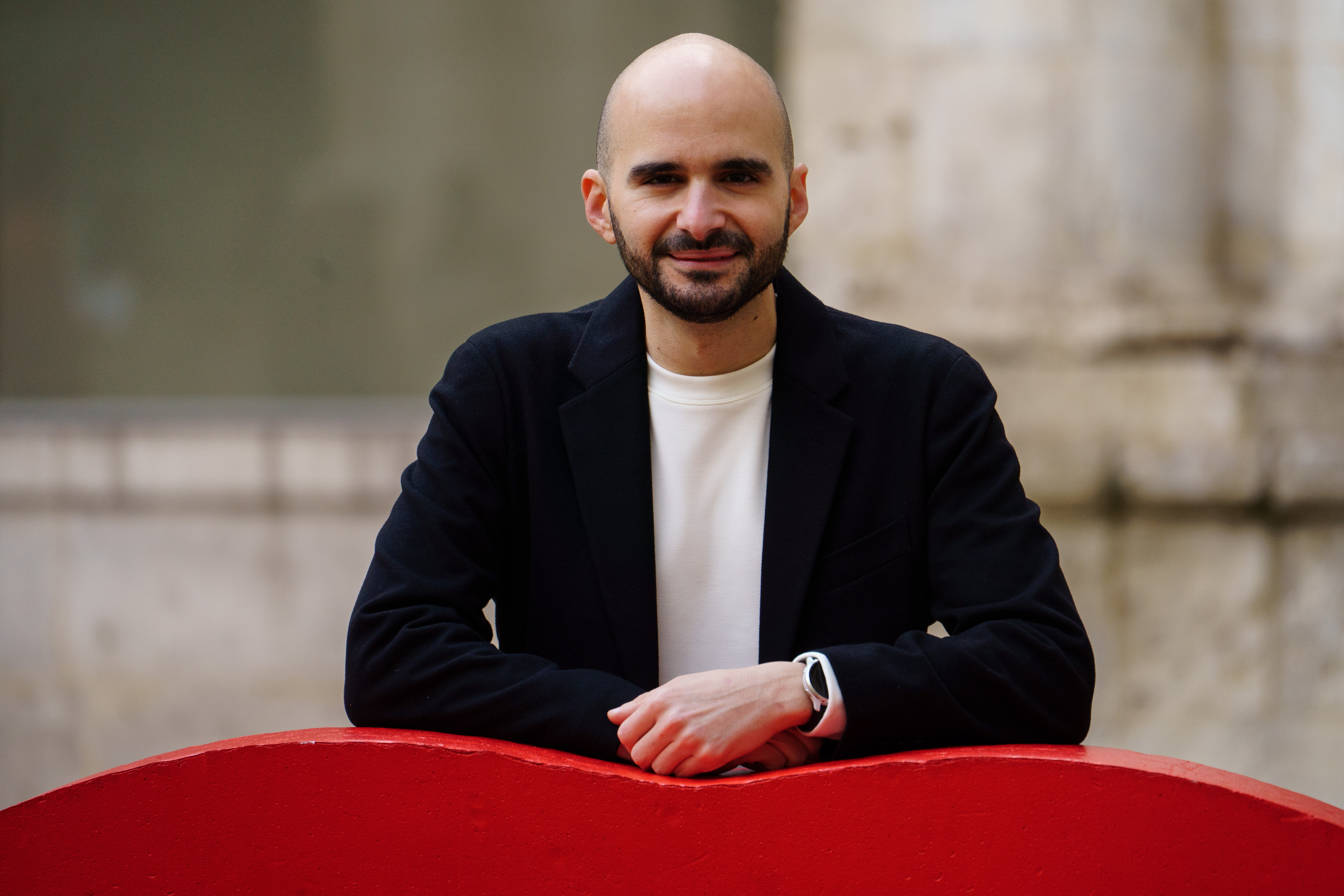
Aris attending the presentation of the film at the 70th Valladolid International Film Festival in October 2025

A Sad and Beautiful World was selected in the Kaleidoscope section of the Filmfest Hamburg and was screened on 1 October 2025. It was also selected in the Thematic strands: 'Love' section of the 2025 BFI London Film Festival and had its UK premiere on 11 October 2025.

It also was chosen for the 'Meeting Point' slate of the 70th Valladolid International Film Festival and was screened in October.

It was also screened in International Perspective at the São Paulo International Film Festival on 24 October 2025.

It competed in the Red Sea: Competition strand at the Red Sea International Film Festival and had screening on 5 December 2025.

The film competed in the Awards Buzz – Best International Feature Film section of the 37th Palm Springs International Film Festival on 3 January 2026.

The film was also part of Horizons section of the 60th Karlovy Vary International Film Festival, where it was screened from 3 July to 8 July 2026.

It screened at the Sydney Opera House and was the Closing Night film at the 15th Lebanese Film Festival in Australia.

== Reception ==
On the review aggregator website Rotten Tomatoes, 100% of 24 critics' reviews are positive, with an average rating of 7.3/10. Metacritic, which uses a weighted average, assigned the film a score of 72 out of 100, based on eight critics, indicating "generally favorable" reviews.

Giorgia Del Don of Cineuropa at the Venice Film Festival's Giornate degli Autori praised the film as director Cyril Aris's heartfelt tribute to Lebanon, highlighting its nuanced portrayal of love, humour, and resilience amid national uncertainty. Del Don commended the film for its emotionally rich narrative spanning three decades, avoiding sentimentality through complex, non-stereotypical characters. While concluding his review, Del Don observed that the effective use of archival footage and Anthony Sahyoun's evocative score, "leads the public between reality and fiction, hope and despair," further more the "need to escape and the fear of leaving;" all the "contradictory feelings" deepen the film's exploration of identity, memory, and the tension between escape and belonging.

=== Accolades ===
Award / Film Festival	Date of ceremony	Category	Recipient(s)	Result	Ref(s)
Venice International Film Festival	6 September 2025	Giornate degli Autori, People’s Choice Award	A Sad and Beautiful World	Won	
Red Sea International Film Festival	13 December 2025	Yusr Best Screenplay	Cyril Aris	Won	
Tromsø International Film Festival	25 January 2026	Aurora Prize – Best Film	A Sad and Beautiful World	Won	

== See also ==
- List of submissions to the 98th Academy Awards for Best International Feature Film
- List of Lebanese submissions for the Academy Award for Best International Feature Film
