= Mounia Akl =

Lebanese film director and screenwriter

- Born: Lebanon
- Education: Lebanese Academy of Fine Arts; Columbia University
- Occupations: Film director, screenwriter, actress
- Years active: 2011–present

Mounia Akl (Arabic: مونيا عقل) is a Lebanese actress, screenwriter, and director. She is perhaps best known for her film Costa Brava, Lebanon, which premiered at the 2021 Venice Film Festival.

== Early life ==
Akl was born in Lebanon. She received a bachelor's degree in architecture from the Lebanese Academy of Fine Arts (ALBA) and a Master of Fine Arts in directing from Columbia University.

== Career ==
In 2011, she and Cyril Aris created Beirut I Love You, a Lebanese television/web-series. She has since written and or directed several shorts, television episodes, and one feature-length film, Costa Brava, Lebanon. In 2024, Alk directed the final three episodes of season 1 of Netflix series House of Guinness. In March 2025, she was selected for TorinoFilmLab’s ScriptLab 2025. In August 2026, it was announced that Akl will direct the five-part Netflix series The Unheard.

== Personal life ==
Akl splits her time between London and New York City.

== Filmography ==
=== Film ===
Year	Title	Director	Writer	Producer	Notes
2010	Cheers, to Those Who Stay	Yes	Yes	Yes	Short film
2011	Anoesis	Yes	Yes	Yes	Short film
2014	Christine	Yes	Yes	No	Short film
2014	Eva	Yes	No	No	Short film
2016	Submarine	Yes	Yes	No	Short film
2016	Lebanon Factory	Yes	Yes	No	Short film, omnibus production
2017	El Gran Libano	Yes	Yes	No	Short film
2021	Costa Brava, Lebanon	Yes	Yes	No	Feature film
2024	Dancing on the Edge of a Volcano	No	No	No	Documentary
2025	A Sad and Beautiful World	No	No	No	Feature film, lead role
TBD	Hold Me (If You Want)	Yes	Yes	Yes	Feature film

=== Television ===
Key
†	Denotes television productions that have not yet been released

Year	Title	Director	Network	Notes
2011-12	Beirut I Love You	Yes	LBC	also lead actress
2023	Boiling Point	Yes	BBC One	2 episodes
2024	The Responder	Yes	BBC One	2 episodes
2025	House of Guinness	Yes	Netflix	3 episodes
2026	It Gets Worse	Yes	Channel 4 Crave	6 episodes
TBA	The Unheard †	Yes	Netflix	5 episodes
