= Zhang Zhongchen =

Chinese director

- 张中臣
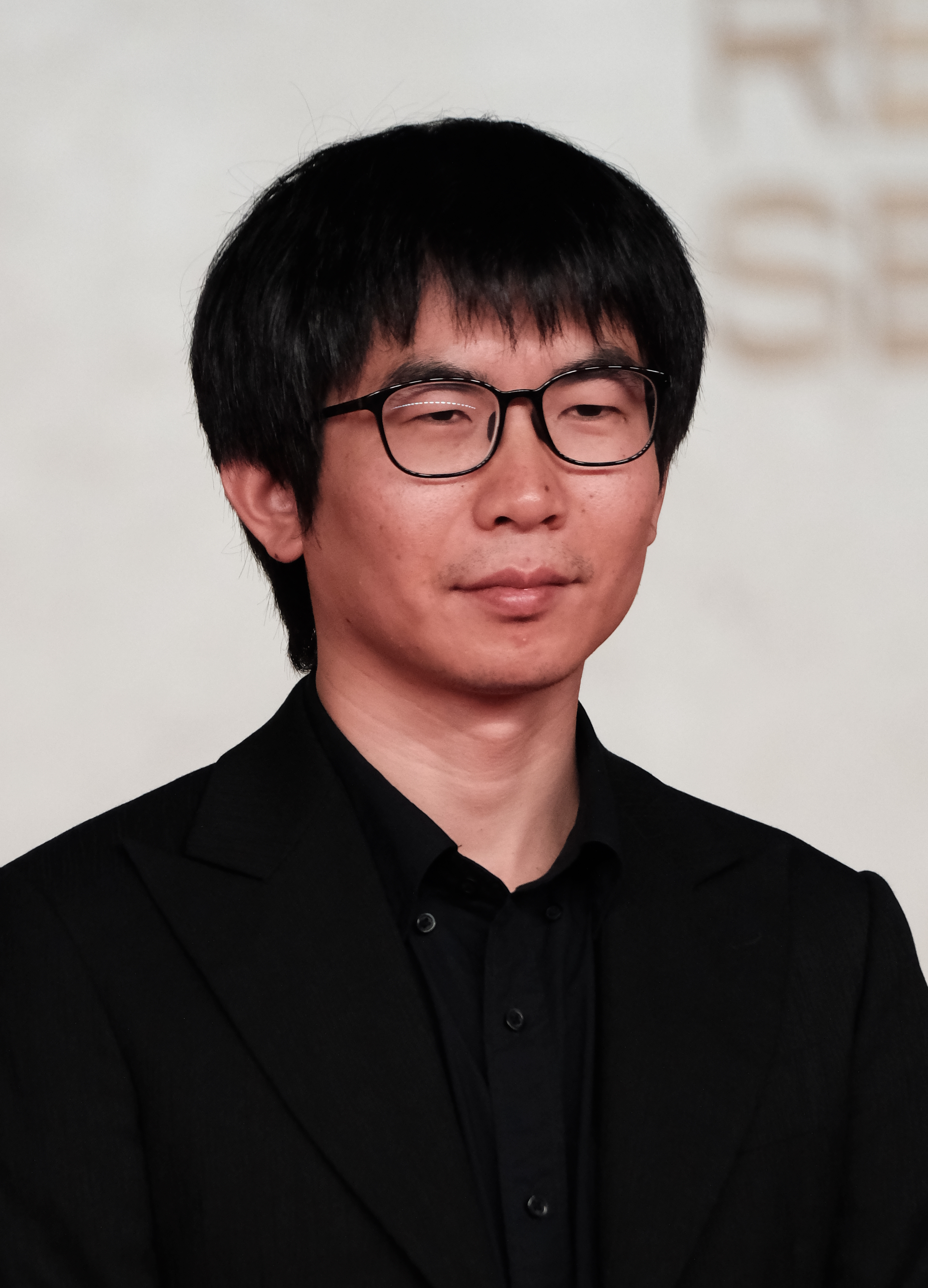
- Zhang in 2025
- Born: Anhui, China
- Occupation: Director
- Years active: 2011–present
- Notable work: Nighttime Sounds

Zhang Zhongchen (张中臣) is a Chinese director. Dubbed as the security guard from Beijing Film Academy, where he indirectly learned about film amid his work shifts, he has directed award-winning features like The White Cow and Nighttime Sounds.

== Early life ==
Zhang was born in a village in Anhui, China. After high school, he worked in an air-conditioning unit factory. In 2011, he and his brother, Zhang Zhongyu, relocated to Beijing where they worked as security guards at the Beijing Film Academy. There, he would occasionally audit lectures, start watching arthouse cinema, and learn digital editing on a laptop.

In 2015, Zhang worked as an editor, and in 2021, he directed his first feature film, The White Cow, which won best feature and best director awards at the First Film Festival in China. It was officially released in theaters in China on December 21, 2024.

Afterward, Zhang directed his second feature, Nighttime Sounds, which premiered at the San Sebastián International Film Festival in 2025 and subsequently appeared at many others, in addition to winning Zhang a best director award at the Pingyao International Film Festival, as well as a one-million-yuan prize from Zhejiang Venture Capital. The film, inspired by his own upbringing, follows a young girl and her mother living in a village who encounter a boy looking for his own mother.
