= Akio Fujimoto =

Japanese filmmaker (born 1988)

- 藤元明緒
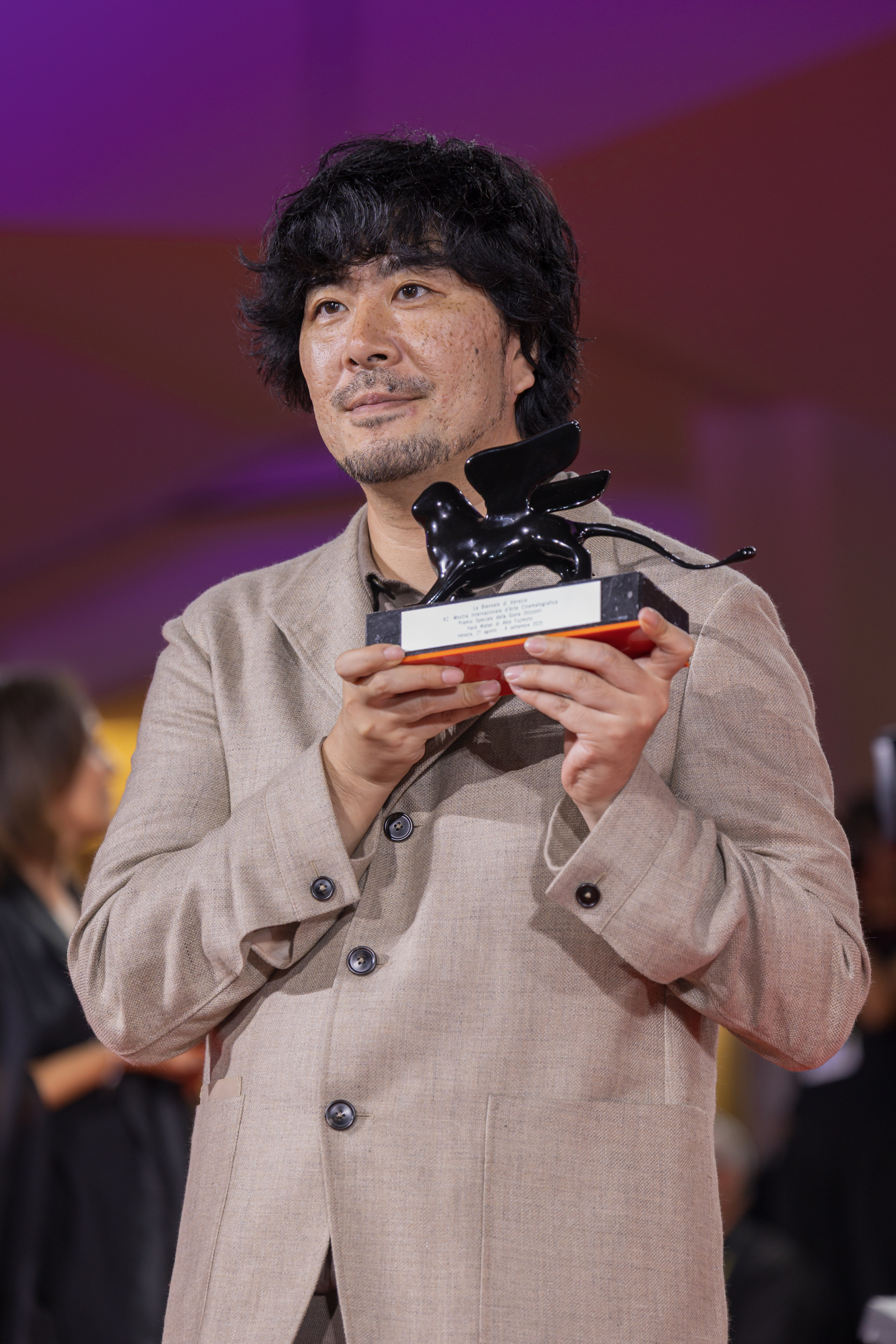
- Born: 15 March 1988 (age 38); Osaka, Japan
- Occupation: Filmmaker

Akio Fujimoto (Japanese: 藤元明緒; born 15 March 1988) is a Japanese film director and screenwriter.

== Life and career ==
Born in Osaka, Fujimoto studied psychology and sociology at the Osaka International University and graduated in filmmaking from the Osaka Visual Arts Academy.

In 2017, he made his directorial feature debut with Passage of Life, which premiered at the Asian Future section of the 30th Tokyo International Film Festival, in which it won the Best Film Award and the Spirit of Asia Award. In 2020, his following film Along the Sea premiered at the 68th San Sebastián International Film Festival. It won the gold prize at the 26th Shindo Kaneto Awards.

In 2025, Fujimoto's third work Lost Land premiered at the 82nd Venice International Film Festival, in the Orizzonti sidebar, winning the Special Jury Prize. For this film, Fujimoto got a nomination for best director at the 18th Asia Pacific Screen Awards.

== Filmography ==
- Psychedelic Family (short, 2012)
- Passage of Life (2017)
- Along the Sea (2020)
- Lost Land (2025)
