= Saudi Arabian Society for Culture and Arts =

- الجمعية العربية السعودية للثقافة والفنون
- Abbreviation: SASCA
- Formation: 1973
- Type: Nonprofit cultural association
- Registration no.: 4708
- Headquarters: Riyadh, Saudi Arabia
- Region served: Saudi Arabia
- Fields: Theater, music, film, visual arts, calligraphy, photography, heritage and folk arts
- Chair of the board: Abdulaziz Al-Sama'il
- Director general: Khalid Al-Baz
- Website: sasca.org.sa

The Saudi Arabian Society for Culture and Arts (SASCA) is a cultural organization headquartered in Riyadh, Saudi Arabia. Established in 1973, it works to develop arts and culture, preserve heritage, support artists and writers, and nurture young talent. The society operates sixteen branches across the country.

== History ==
The Saudi Arabian Society for Culture and Arts was established in 1973 as the first civil institution in Saudi Arabia dedicated to sponsoring cultural and artistic activities. It originated from an initiative by a group of poets, actors, musicians and artists who sought to unite their talents and promote their cultural and artistic interests under one organization. The society received its initial license in 1973 and its final license in 1975.

== Activities ==
The society's activities cover theater, music, film, visual arts, Arabic calligraphy, photography, heritage and folk arts. Its branches include committees for heritage, folk and musical arts, photography and visual arts. The society organizes exhibitions, theatrical productions and cultural events in Saudi Arabia and abroad, and publishes books, magazines and other cultural publications.

== Thaqqif ==
In October 2018, SASCA launched the Institute of Culture and Arts for Training, known as Thaqqif, as part of initiatives associated with Saudi Vision 2030. The institute was intended to develop performance and technical skills and provide arts training. Its planned courses included fine arts, photography, calligraphy, digital arts and design, art writing, music, theater, folk arts, filmmaking and cinema.
