= Ameer Fakher Eldin =

Syrian director and screenwriter

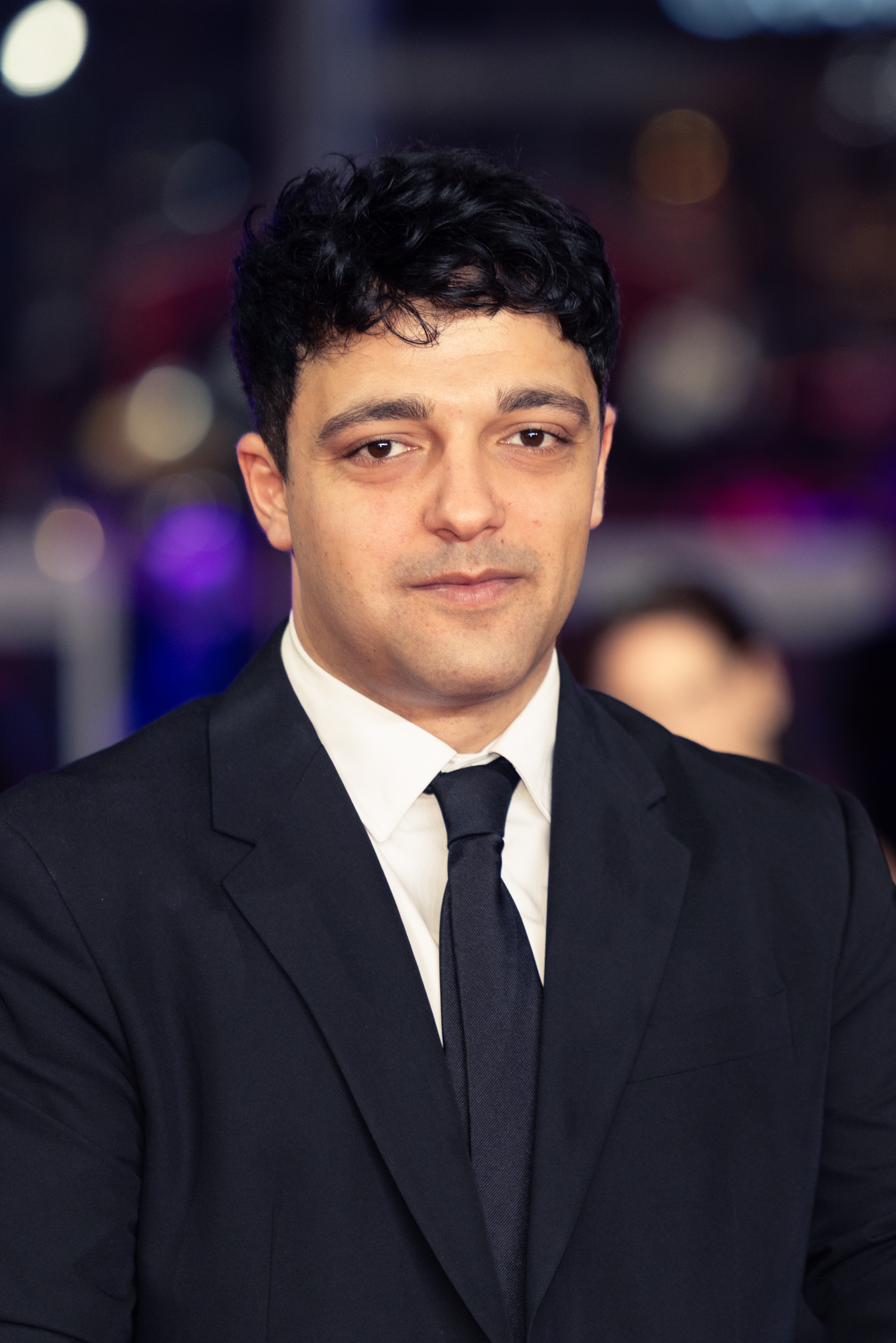
- Eldin in 2026
- Born: 4 December 1991 (age 34); Kiev, Ukraine
- Occupations: Film director; Screenwriter
- Years active: 2015 - present

Ameer Fakher Eldin (born 1991) is a film director currently based in Germany. He is known for his feature films The Stranger (2021) and Yunan (2025).

== Biography ==
He was born in Kyiv, Ukraine, to Lebanese and Syrian expatriate parents from the Golan Heights.

His feature directorial debut, The Stranger (al-Gharīb), premiered in the Giornate degli Autori program at the 78th Venice International Film Festival. The film, the first in a planned trilogy of films about people from the Arabic world living in exile, was selected as the Palestinian submission for the Best International Feature Film at the 94th Academy Awards.

Yunan, the second film in the trilogy, premiered in February 2025 at the 75th Berlin International Film Festival.

== Filmography ==
Year	English Title	Original Title
2015	Between Two Deaths	Bayna Mawtayn
2017	Voicemail	Barid Sawti
2021	The Stranger	الغريب
2025	Yunan	يونان
