= Haifaa al-Mansour =

Saudi Arabian film director (born 1974)

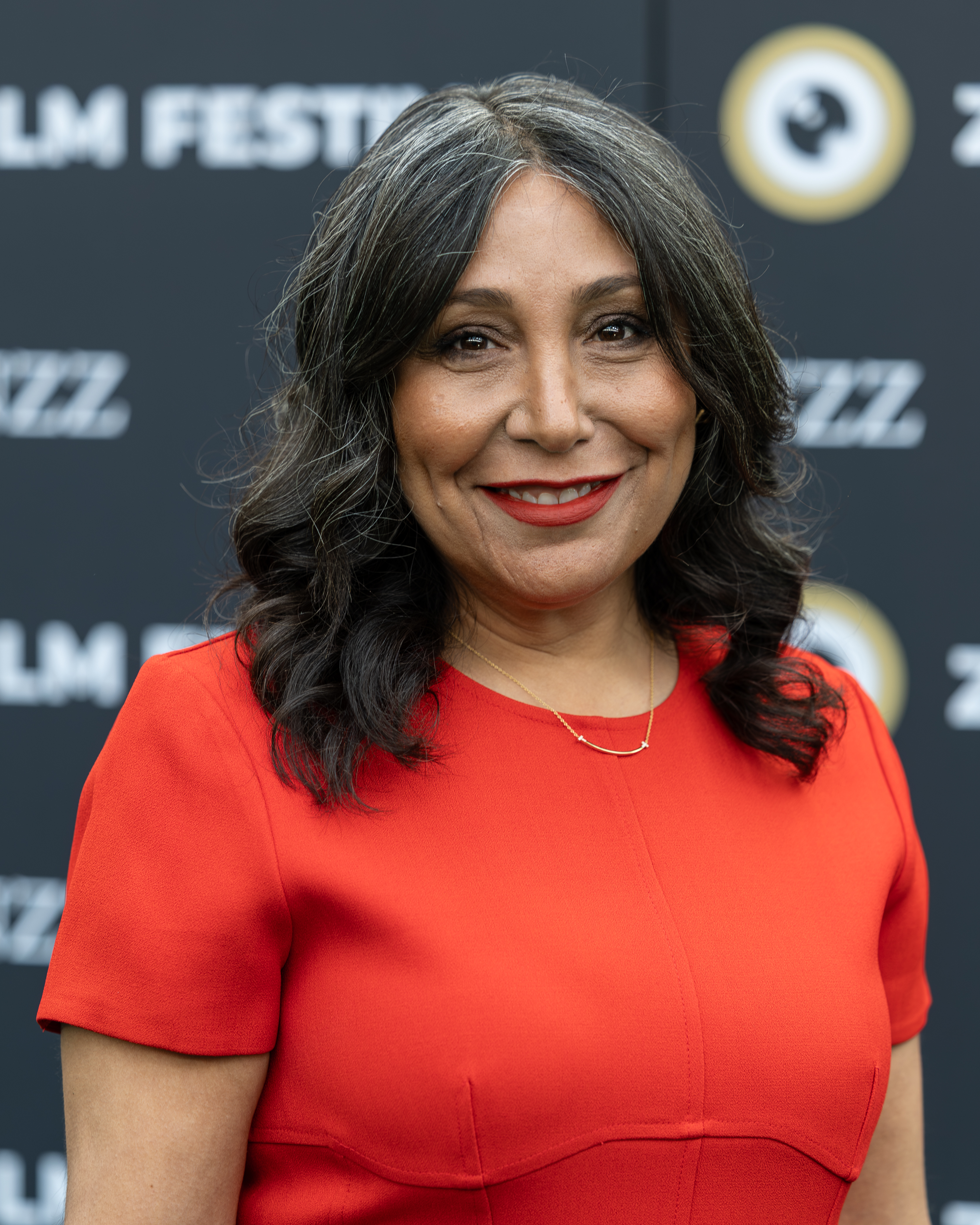
- Haifaa Al-Mansour on the Green Carpet at the 2025 Zurich Film Festival.
- Born: 10 August 1974 (age 52); Al Zulfi, Riyadh, Saudi Arabia
- Education: The American University in Cairo; University of Sydney
- Occupations: Director, producer, screenwriter
- Years active: 1997–present
- Spouse: Bradley Niemann (m. 2007)
- Children: 2

Haifaa al-Mansour (Arabic: هيفاء المنصور Hayfā'a al-Manṣūr; born 10 August 1974) is a Saudi Arabian film director. She is one of the country's best-known and one of the first female Saudi filmmakers.

== Early life and education ==
Haifaa is the eighth of twelve children of Abdul Rahman Mansour, a poet and lawyer, and grew up in Al-Hasa. Her family was liberal and non-traditional; she and her siblings were allowed to listen to music, read books and magazines, and watch TV and movies. Cinemas were banned in Saudi Arabia starting in 1983; Mansour would watch movies by standing outside a video store, selecting what she wanted from a catalog, and having the clerk bring the tape to her. She was especially fond of Disney films, Bollywood musicals, and the films of Jackie Chan. The ban on cinemas in Saudi Arabia was lifted in 2018.

With her father's encouragement, she studied comparative literature at The American University in Cairo. After school, Haifaa worked at an oil company and taught English, later completing a master's degree in Film Studies from University of Sydney, Australia.

== Career ==
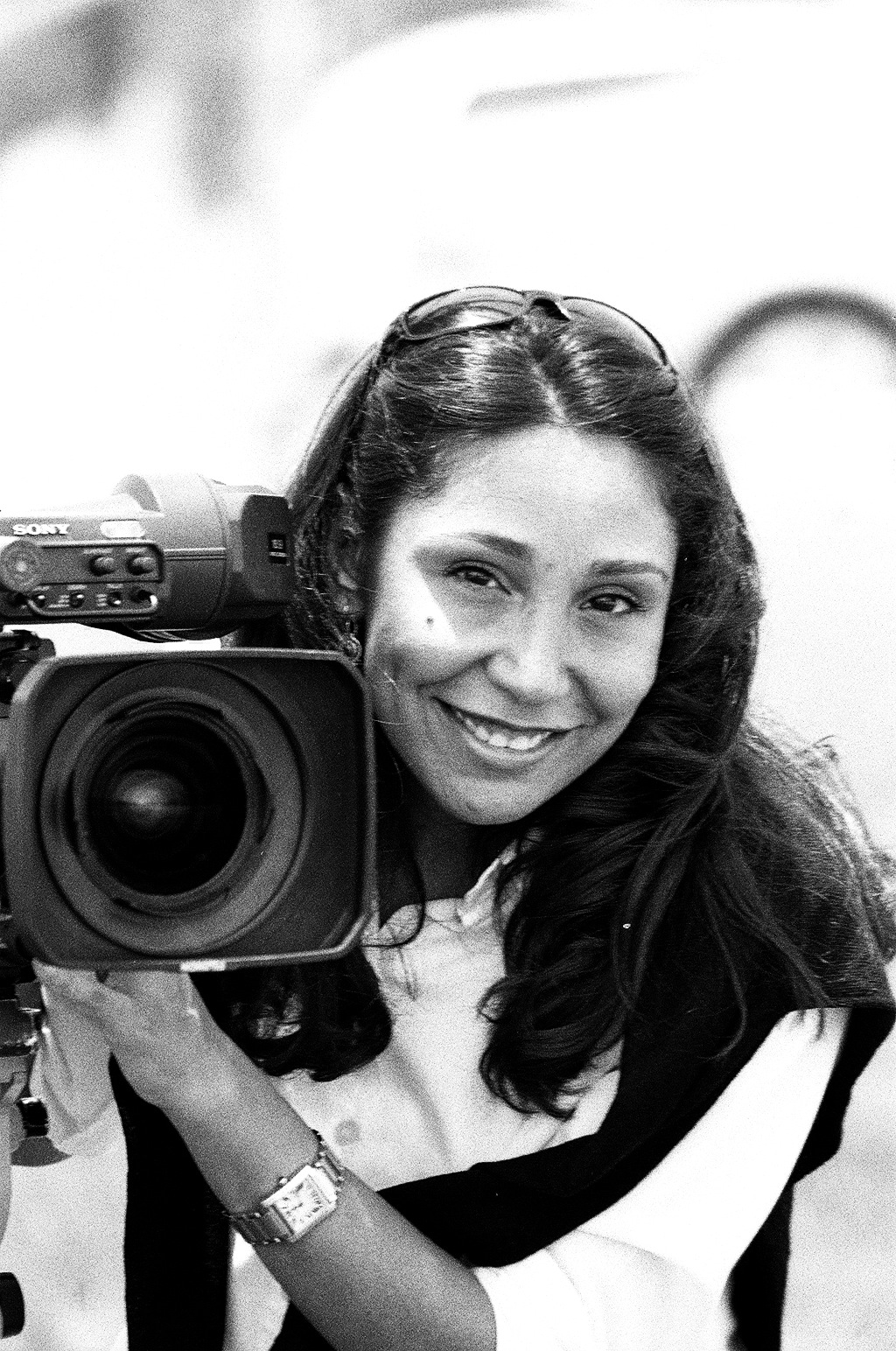
al-Mansour in 2011

She began her filmmaking career with three shorts, Who?, The Bitter Journey, and The Only Way Out. The Only Way Out won prizes in the United Arab Emirates and in the Netherlands. She followed these with the documentary Women Without Shadows, which deals with the hidden lives of women in Arab States of the Persian Gulf. It was shown at 17 international festivals. The film received the Golden Dagger for Best Documentary in the Muscat Film Festival and a special jury mention in the fourth Arab Film Festival in Rotterdam. Haifaa al-Mansour was a guest at the 28th Three Continents Festival in Nantes, France.

Her feature debut, Wadjda, which she wrote as well as directed (and which is considered her break-out film) made its world premiere at the 2012 Venice Film Festival; it is the first full-length feature to be shot entirely in Saudi Arabia and as of 2013, the only feature-length film made in Saudi Arabia by a female director. Wadjda tells the story of a 10-year-old girl growing up in the suburbs of Riyadh, who dreams of owning and riding a green bicycle. Wadjda took five years to be made because of the typical constraints and challenges Haifaa went through to have the film released. The segregation of men and women in Saudi Arabia forced her to direct it in a small van with only a monitor and a walkie-talkie to communicate orders. Al-Mansour stated it was a very difficult and frustrating experience, but the most important thing to her was that she was the first female Saudi Arabian filmmaker who created the first feature film, fully filmed in Saudi Arabia. The film was backed by Rotana, the film production company of Prince Al-Waleed bin Talal. Wadjda was selected as the Saudi Arabian entry for the Best Foreign Language Film at the 86th Academy Awards, which is the first time Saudi Arabia has submitted a film for the Best Foreign Language Oscar. The project had been developed in 2009 during the Gulf screenwriting lab, a collaboration between TorinoFilmLab and Dubai International Film Festival. Seven years later, she made her fourth feature film, The Perfect Candidate, in 2019 which was the first feature film to be supported by the newly established national Saudi Film Council.

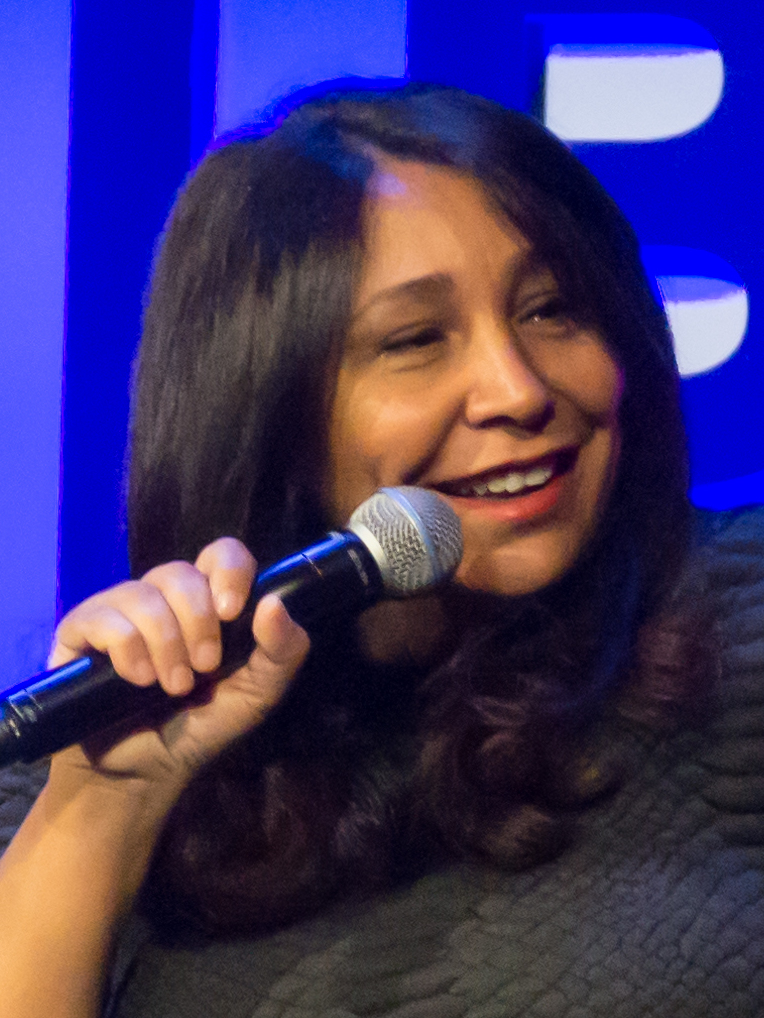
al-Mansour in 2018

She did not intend that her film work focus on women's issues, but found them too important to not address. Both Who? and Women Without Shadows deal with the custom of abaya. She has received hate mail and criticism for being unreligious, which she denies. She does, however, feel that Saudi Arabia needs to take a more critical view of its culture. She also received praise from Saudis for encouraging discussion on topics usually considered taboo. Al-Mansour often creates films about strong, independent, and resilient women, inspired from her own experiences. She has a supportive family, but those that surrounded her maintained the conservative politics in that town and condemned her for seeking film, using the argument that it is haram (forbidden in Islam), although the claim is controversial and not agreed upon by the majority of Muslims. Regardless, she continued making films about women who wanted to change the way women in Saudi Arabia are perceived and what they are allowed to do.

In 2014, it was reported that Al-Mansour was to direct A Storm in the Stars, an upcoming romantic drama film about the early life of writer Mary Shelley. The film was later retitled Mary Shelley and premiered at the 2017 Toronto International Film Festival.

Al-Mansour next announced she was on board to direct Nappily Ever After, an adaptation of the book of the same name by Trisha R. Thomas.

She was selected to be on the jury for the Un Certain Regard section of the 2015 Cannes Film Festival.

In January 2019, Al-Mansour "received a Crystal Award at the World Economic Forum's 2019 meeting in Davos for her leadership in cultural transformation in the Arab world."

In April 2020, it was announced that she would direct Netflix's upcoming film The Selection, based on the first entry in Kiera Cass' popular book series. The film was later scrapped.

In 2020, she directed an episode on The Good Lord Bird.

== Personal life ==
Al-Mansour lived in Bahrain for some years, and eventually moved to California with her husband, Bradley Niemann, an American diplomat, and their two children, Adam and Haylie.

== Filmography ==
=== Feature film ===
Year	English Title	Original title	Director	Writer	Producer
2012	Wadjda	وجدة	Yes	Yes	No
2017	Mary Shelley		Yes	Uncredited	No
2018	Nappily Ever After		Yes	No	No
2019	The Perfect Candidate	المرشحة المثالية	Yes	Yes	Yes
2025	Unidentified		Yes	Yes	Yes

=== Documentary film ===
- Women Without Shadows (نساء بلا الظل) (2005)

=== Short film ===
Year	Title	Director	Writer
1997	Who? (من؟)	Yes	Yes
2000	The Bitter Journey (الرحيل المر)	Yes	Yes
2001	The Only Way Out (أنا والآخر)	Yes	No
2018	The Wedding Singer's Daughter	Yes	Yes

=== Television ===
Year	Title	Episode(s)
2019	The Society	"Putting on the Clothes"
2020	Motherland: Fort Salem	"Hail Beltane"
2020	The Good Lord Bird	"Hiving the Bees"
2020	The Wilds	"Day Seven"
2021	The L Word: Generation Q	"Launch Party"
2021	The L Word: Generation Q	"Last Dance"
2021	The Sinner	"Part V"
2022	Archive 81	"Through the Looking Glass"
2022	Archive 81	"The Circle"
2022	Tales of the Walking Dead	"Amy / Dr. Everett"
2023	Mayfair Witches	"The Thrall"
2023	Mayfair Witches	"Transference"
2023	Florida Man	"One More Day"
2023	Florida Man	"Please, Don't Wake Up"
2023	City on Fire	"The Family Business"
2023	City on Fire	"Land of a Thousand Dances"
2023	Bosch: Legacy	"Seventy-Four Degrees in Belize"
2023	Fear the Walking Dead	"Fighting Like You"

== Awards ==
- BAFTA award for Best Film Not in the English Language for Wadjda (2014)
- BFI London Film Festival Sutherland Award nominee for Wadjda (2014)
- Sundance Film Festival Global Filmmaking Award (2015)
- Edinburgh Film Festival Audience Award nominee for Mary Shelley (2018)
- Venice Film Festival Golden Lion nominee for The Perfect Candidate (2019)
