= Shahad Ameen =

Saudia Arabian filmmaker

Shahad Ameen شهد أمين
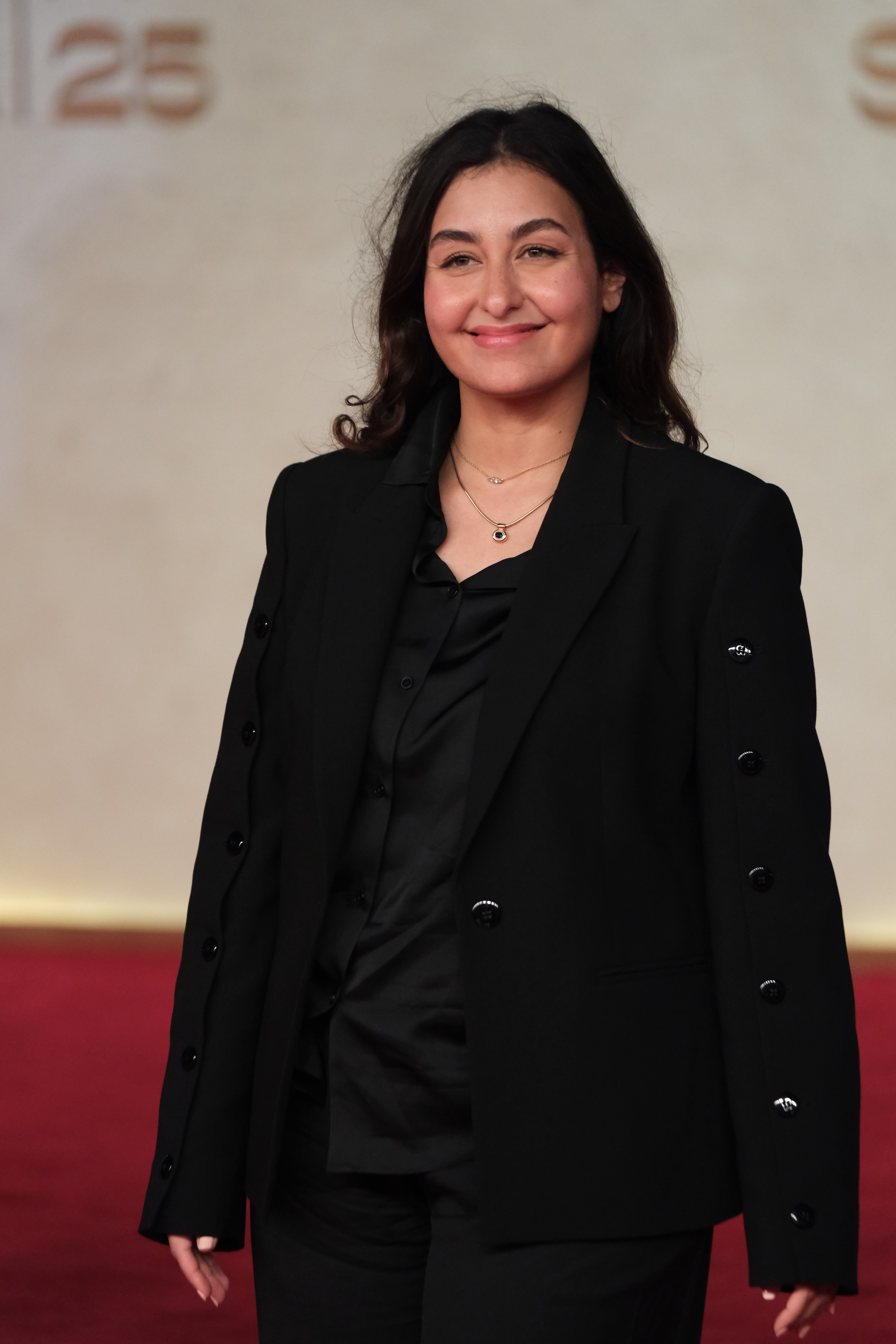
- Ameen in 2025
- Born: Jeddah, Saudi Arabia
- Education: University of West London
- Occupations: Film director, screenwriter

Shahad Ameen (Arabic: شهد أمين) is a Saudi filmmaker best known for directing the 2019 film Scales.

== Early life and education ==
Ameen was born and raised in Jeddah. She attended the University of West London and graduated with a bachelor's degree in Video Production and Film Studies. In 2012, she participated in the screenwriting conservatory at the New York Film Academy.

== Career ==
Ameen's first short film, Our Own Musical, was released in 2009. Leila's Window, her 2011 short film about a young girl's alienation from her family, screened at the Gulf Film Festival and the Saudi Film festival.

In 2013, Ameen's short film Eye & Mermaid debuted at the Dubai International Film Festival. Telling the story of a girl who learns the pearls her father brings their family have been taken from mermaids, the short also screened at the Toronto International Film Festival and was recognized with the Best Cinematography award at the Abu Dhabi Film Festival.

After completing the script for Eye & Mermaid, Ameen began work on her first feature-length project, also about mermaids. The resulting film, Scales, premiered at the International Critic's Week portion of the 76th Venice International Film Festival in 2019.

In May 2024, Variety reported that Ameen's second feature film, Hijra, was in production after years of development. Hijra world-premiered at the 82nd Venice International Film Festival's Venice Spotlight section in August 2025.

== Filmography ==
Year	Title	Notes	Ref.
2009	Our Own Musical	Short film	
2011	Leila's Window	Short film	
2013	Eye & Mermaid	Short film	
2019	Scales	Feature film	
2025	Hijra	Feature film	

== Awards and nominations ==
Year	Award	Category	Nominated work	Result	Ref.
2014	Abu Dhabi Film Festival	Best Cinematography	Eye & Mermaid	Won	
2014	Emirates Film Competition	Short Narrative Competition	Eye & Mermaid	Won	
2019	Venice Film Festival	International Critics' Week	Scales	Nominated	
2019	Venice Film Festival	Verona Film Club Award	Scales	Won	
2019	BFI London Film Festival	Best First Feature	Scales	Won	
2019	Carthage Film Festival	Official Competition Narrative Feature Film	Scales	Bronze Tanit	
2019	Singapore International Film Festival	Best Asian Feature Film	Scales	Won	
2020	Taipei Film Festival	International New Talent Competition	Scales	Nominated	
2020	Sydney Science Fiction Film Festival	Best Feature Film	Scales	Won	
