= Cinema of the United Arab Emirates =

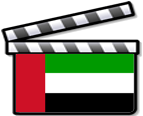
- No. of screens: 333 (2024)
  - Per capita: 3.3 per 100,000 (2024)

Number of admissions (2024)
- Total: 72,000,000

Gross box office (2024)
- Total: $730 million

Cinema of the United Arab Emirates began with a number of feature films that were broadcast on national television since the late 1980s.

In 2002, Emirates Film Competition was formed which influenced a generation of Emirati filmmakers to explore the short film format. The competition was merged onto Abu Dhabi Film Festival, which would eventually be shut down along with the Gulf Film Festival. However, the Dubai International Film Festival was founded in 2004 and continues its run till date. In April 2018, it was announced that the 15th edition of the festival would be postponed to 2019, re-launching as a bi-annual festival after running annually for 14 years

In 2005, The Dream became the first Emirati film to be distributed in cinemas across UAE. Meanwhile, the UAE began to attract South Asian films and television serials, mainly Bollywood and Lollywood productions.

In addition, UAE has a film studio (Dubai Studio City) which has been built to cultivate film making in the region. The Dubai Film and TV Commission (DTFC) which was established in line with Executive Council Decision 16 of 2012 is the sole authority to issue film shooting permits in Dubai. In Abu Dhabi, the Abu Dhabi Film Commission issues shooting permits to production companies that hold a valid media zone authority trade license.

In 2008, Majid Abdulrazak became the first Emirati filmmaker to adapt a book into a film based on Wilfred Thesiger's Arabian Sands.

In 2009, the second edition of the Gulf Film Festival saw the premiere of two Emirati feature films for the first time. The Circle, by filmmaker and actor Nawaf Al-Janahi, told the story of Ibrahim, a poet and journalist who captures a thief and finds himself changing lives with him. Director and novelist Saleh Karama also showcased his first feature, Henna, in which the title character's mother is sick, and her frequent fits have led to a divorce; fatherless Henna has to find a way to relate to her new father-figure, a Bedouin relative who arrives from the desert with his camels to visit the family.

The sixth edition of the Dubai International Film Festival in 2009 featured further screenings of The Circle and the premiere of the multilingual City of Life by Emirati director Ali F. Mostafa, which went on to achieve general release in UAE cinemas in the following year.

Nawaf Al-Janahi's film Sea Shadow was released on 17 November 2011. It came out on DVD on 25 September 2013.

The first Emirati Science Fiction feature-length film called Aerials was released on 16 June 2016. Directed by S.A.Zaidi and produced by Ghanem Ghubash, Aerials was released in UAE simultaneously with Independence Day 2 as a contrast of both being alien invasion films.

The UAE also has its own independent cinemas such as The Scene Club and Cinema Akil, founded in 2007 and 2014 respectively. Cinema Akil became the first permanent independent cinema house in September 2018.

Abu Dhabi's Environment Agency's Year of Zayed environmental documentary Zayed's Antarctic Lights which chronicled the adventure of the agency's Team Zayed to Antarctica, where they sent a message to the world in solar lights, won a Bronze World Medal at the New York TV & Film Awards.

Abu Dhabi's Environment Agency's 2021 environmental documentary Wild Abu Dhabi: The Turtles of Al Dhafra which showcases the turtles of Al Dhafra and the agency's conservation programme, won a finalist award in the 2021 New York Festivals TV and Film Awards.

== Emirati films ==
| Year | Title | Director | Actors | Genre | Notability |
|---|---|---|---|---|---|
| 1988 | Aber Sabeel | Ali Al Abdool | Aisha Abdulrahman, Bilal Abdullah | Drama | First Emirati film |
| 1990 | Alteen Alakheer | Jassim Jaber | | | TV film |
| 1996 | Makan Fil Qalb | Mohammed Najib | Mohammed Al Amri, Moza Al Mazrooei, Sameera Ahmad | War, Drama | |
| 2002 | The Time Machine | Simon Wells | Guy Pearce, Samantha Mumba, Orlando Jones, Mark Addy, Jeremy Irons | Post-apocalyptic, Science fiction | Co-production with the U.S. |
| 2005 | The Dream | Hani Al Shaibani | Nawaf Al Janahi, Ali Al Jabri, Abdulla Hassan Ahmed | Drama | First Emirati film to release across UAE |
| 2006 | Tarab Fashion | Mohamed Daham | Hassan Ballam, Mayssa Maghrebi | Comedy | |
| 2006 | Haneen | Mohammad Al-Traifi | Fatima Abdulrahim, Moza AlMazrooei, Yalda | Drama | |
| 2006 | Eqaab | Majid Abdulrazak | Majid Albulrazak, Haifa Hussain, Mohammad Al Janahi | Drama | |
| 2008 | Arabian Sands | Majid Abdulrazak | Abdullah Al Tararwah, Ali Tamimi, Majid Abdulrazak, Murad Fakhri Baluchi | Biographical, Adventure | Based on the book of the same name |
| 2009 | The Circle | Nawaf Al Janahi | Abdulmohsin Al Nimer, Ali Al Jabri, Nawaf Al Janahi | Crime, Drama | |
| 2009 | Henna | Saleh Karama | Gazelle, Ayisha Hammed, Salem Obaid Al Raihi | Drama | |
| 2009 | The Return of Umm Al Duwais | Juma Al Sahli | Sameera Ahmad, Sogha | Horror | TV film |
| 2010 | City of Life | Ali F. Mostafa | Habib Ghuloom, Saoud Al Kaabi | Drama | |
| 2011 | Sea Shadow | Nawaf Al Janahi | Neven Madi, Omar Almulla | Drama | |
| 2013 | Bani Adam | Majid Abdulrazak | Abdulla Abdulaziz, Alaa Shaker | Drama | |
| 2013 | Hob Malaki | Jamal Salem | Habib Ghuloom, Mansoor Al Feeli, Huda Salah | Romance | |
| 2013 | Djinn | Tobe Hooper | Abdulla Al Junaibi, Saoud Al Kaabi | Horror | |
| 2014 | Grandmother's Farm | Ahmed Zain | Saeed Al Sharyani, Khalid Alnuaimi, Yaser Al Neyadi | Horror, Comedy | |
| 2014 | From A to B | Ali F. Mostafa | Fahad Albutairi, Shadi Alfons | Drama, Comedy | |
| 2014 | Sundress | Saeed Salmeen Al Murry | Habib Ghuloom, Marrai Alhalyan, Neven Madi, Ahmad Abdullah, Sophia Jawad | Drama | |
| 2014 | Abood Kandaishan | Fadel AlMheiri | Abdulrahman Al Nakhi, Sawsan Saad | Comedy | |
| 2014 | Dolphins | Waleed Al Shehhi | Reem Erhama, Khalid Ameen | Adventure, Drama | |
| 2015 | Zinzana | Majid Alansari | Ali Suliman, Saleh Bakri | Thriller | |
| 2015 | Going to Heaven | Saeed Salmeen Al Murry | Jumaa Al Zaabi, Fatima Al Taei | Drama | |
| 2015 | Grandmother's Farm 2 | Ahmed Zain | Saeed Al Sharyani, Khalid Alnuaimi, Yaser Al Neyadi | Horror, Comedy | |
| 2015 | Abdullah | Humaid Al Suwaidi | Mansoor Al Feeli, Mohammed Al Hammadi, Fatima Al Taei, Alaa Shaker | Drama | |
| 2016 | Dhay Fe Abu Dhabi | Rakan | Hassan Hosny, Ahmed Saleh | Comedy | |
| 2016 | Aerials | S A Zaidi | Saga Alyasery, Mansoor Al Feeli | Sci-Fi | First Emirati sci-fi film |
| 2016 | Hajwala | Ali Bin Muttar, Ibrahim Bin Mohammed | Anwar Aljabri, Sawsan Saad | Action | |
| 2016 | A Drop of Blood | Nasser Al Tamimi | Habib Ghuloom, Amal Mohammed | Horror | |
| 2016 | Bilal: A New Breed of Hero | Ayman Jamal, Khurram Alavi | Adewale Akinnuoye-Agbaje, Jacob Latimore, Andre Robinson, Ian McShane | Animation | |
| 2017 | The Worthy | Ali F. Mostafa | Ali Suliman, Habib Ghuloom | Action, Thriller | |
| 2017 | Kart Ahmar | Nasser Al Tamimi | Bilal Abdulla, Badria Ahmed | Sports | |
| 2017 | Dhay Fe Thailand | Rakan | Hassan Hosny, Ahmed Saleh | Comedy | |
| 2017 | A Tale of Shadows | Tariq Alkazim | Almer Agmyren, Dijana Divjak, Chuka Ekweogwu | Thriller | |
| 2017 | Lisa | Ahmed Zain | Ayman Khadim, Nasser Al Dhanhani, Ali Al Shehhi | Comedy | |
| 2017 | Only Men Go to the Grave | Abdulla Al Kaabi | Abdelreza Nasari, Hebe Sabah, Awatif Salman, Saleema Yaqoub | Drama | Iraqi-language film |
| 2018 | Awar Qalb | Jamal Salem | Abdulla Zaid, Juma Ali, Neven Madi, Marwa Rateb | Comedy | |
| 2018 | Fan of Amoory | Saeed Salmeen Al-Murry | Jumaa Al Zaabi, Mansoor Al Feeli, Alaa Shaker | Sports | |
| 2018 | Wesalna Wela B'adna | Aisha Al Zaabi | Ahmed Abdulrazaq, Fatima Al Hosani, Mariam Sultan | Comedy | |
| 2018 | Our Argentinian Maid | Hamed Saleh | Ahmed Ahdy, Ahmed Al-Rekabi, Abdelrahman Al-Zaraoni | Comedy | |
| 2018 | Camera | Abdulla Al Junaibi | Humaid Alawadi, Yaser Alneyadi, Omar Almulla | Thriller | |
| 2018 | Freej Al Taibeen | Ahmed Zain | Ali Al Shehhi, Huda Alghanim, Khaled Al Nuaimi | Comedy | |
| 2018 | Until Midnight | Tariq Al Kazim | Ahmed Khamis Ali, Chuka Ekweogwu | Thriller | |
| 2018 | Hajwala 2 | Ibrahim bin Mohamed | Hussain Al Hosani, Ali Abdulla Al Marzooqi, Abdulla Al Youssif | Action | |
| 2018 | Shabab Sheyab | Yasir Al-Yasiri | Saad Al Faraj, Mansoor Al Feeli, Marie Al Halyan | Comedy | |
| 2018 | 11 Days | Sudheer Konderi | Habib Ghuloom, Ahmed Al Hashimi | Family | |
| 2018 | Back to the Wild | Veronia Iocono | Razan Khalifa Al Mubarak, Shaikha Al Dhaheri | Environmental Documentary | |
| 2018 | Zayed's Antarctic Lights | Winston Cowie | Mariam Al Qassimi, Rashed Al Zaabi, Winston Cowie, Razan Khalifa Al Mubarak, Jane Goodall, Robert Swan. | Environmental Documentary | Bronze World Medal New York Festivals TV & Film Awards |
| 2019 | Safar Edtirari | Nasser Al Tamimi | Habib Ghuloom, Badria Talbah, Fay Sharqawi, Issa Arab | Comedy | |
| 2019 | Ali and Alia | Hussain Al Ansari | Khalifa Al Bahri, Neven Madi, Sawsan Saad | Drama, Romance | |
| 2019 | Rashid & Rajab | Mohammed Saeed Harib | Marwan Abdulla, Shadi Alfons | Comedy | |
| 2019 | Catsaway | Fadel Al Mheiri | | Animation | |
| 2019 | Our Sea. Our Heritage | Winston Cowie | Razan Khalifa Al Mubarak, Shaikha Al Dhaheri | Environmental documentary | |
| 2021 | Wild Abu Dhabi: The Turtles of Al Dhafra | Winston Cowie | H.E Dr Shaikha Al Dhaheri, Hind Al Ameri, Maitha Mohamed Al Hameli, Ibrahim Bugla, Ahmed Esmaeil Al Hashmi | Environmental Documentary | 2021 Finalist - New York Festivals TV and Film Awards |
| 2024 | Late Night with the Devil | Colin and Cameron Cairnes | David Dastmalchian, Laura Gordon, Ian Bliss, Fayssal Bazzi, Ingrid Torelli, Rhys Auteri, Georgina Haig, Josh Quong Tart | Horror | |
| TBA | A Tale of Shadows: Illusions | Tariq Alkazim | Chuka Ekweogwu, Robert Cristian Trif | Suspense Drama | Feature film (pre-production) |

== Films shot in the United Arab Emirates ==
- Saaho (Indian; 2019) partly filmed in Abu Dhabi
- Xero Error (2010) Filmed in Dubai
- Mission: Impossible – Fallout (American; 2018) partly filmed in Abu Dhabi
- Race 3 (Indian; 2018) partly filmed in Abu Dhabi
- Tiger Zinda Hai (Indian; 2017) partly filmed in Abu Dhabi
- War Machine (American; 2017) partly filmed in Abu Dhabi
- Kung Fu Yoga (Chinese; 2017) partly filmed in Dubai
- Star Trek Beyond (American; 2016) partly filmed in Dubai
- Star Wars: The Force Awakens (American; 2015) partly filmed in Abu Dhabi
- Dishoom (Indian; 2016) partly filmed in Abu Dhabi
- Airlift (Indian; 2016) filmed in Ras Al Khaimah
- Furious 7 (American; 2015) partly filmed in Abu Dhabi
- Madhura Naranga (Malayalam) 2015
- Masterpiece (Kannada; 2015) one song
- Jacobinte Swargarajyam (Malayalam) 2015
- Happy New Year (Indian; 2014) largely filmed in Dubai
- Switch (Chinese; 2013) filmed in Dubai
- Casanovva (Indian; 2012)
- Oru Kal Oru Kannadi (Tamil; 2012) one song
- Diamond Necklace (Malayalam) 2012
- Dam 999 (Hollywood-Indian collaboration; 2011) partly filmed in Fujairah, UAE
- Oru Marubhoomikkadha (Malayalam; 2011)
- Singam (Tamil; 2010) one song
- Mission: Impossible – Ghost Protocol (American; 2010) partly filmed in Dubai
- The Kingdom (American; 2007) filmed in Abu Dhabi
- Risk (Indian; 2007)
- Arabikkatha (Malayalam) 2007
- Balram vs. Tharadas (Indian; 2006)
- Family: Ties of Blood (Indian; 2006) partly filmed in Dubai
- Keif al-Hal? (Saudi; 2006)
- 36 China Town (Indian; 2006) partly filmed in Dubai
- The Killer (Indian, 2006) mostly filmed in Dubai
- Pehla Pehla Pyar (Pakistani; 2006) partly filmed in Dubai
- Tarap (Pakistani; 2006) partly filmed in Dubai
- Woh Lamhe (Indian; 2006) partly filmed in Dubai
- Kisse Pyaar Karoon (Indian; 2005) partly filmed in Dubai
- Deewane Huye Paagal (Indian; 2005) partly filmed in Dubai
- Dune: Part Two (American; 2024) partly filmed in Abu Dhabi
- El-Sefara fi El-Omara (Egyptian; 2005) partly filmed in Dubai
- Silsiilay (Indian; 2005) partly filmed in Dubai
- Syriana (American; 2005) partly filmed in Dubai
- Boom (Indian; 2003) partly filmed in Dubai
- Pyar Hi Pyar Mein (Pakistani; 2003) partly filmed in Dubai
- Talaash: The Hunt Begins... (Indian; 2003) partly filmed in Dubai
- Code 46 (British; 2003) partly filmed in Dubai
- Chalo Ishq Larain (Pakistani; 2002) partly filmed in Dubai
- Dil Vil Pyar Vyar (Indian; 2002) partly filmed in Abu Dhabi
- Maine Pyar Kyun Kiya? (Indian; 2005) partly filmed in Dubai
- Mujhse Shaadi Karogi (Indian; 2004) partly filmed in Dubai
- Market (Indian; 2003) partly filmed in Dubai
- Om Jai Jagadish (Indian; 2002) partly filmed in Dubai
- Hera Pheri (Indian, 2000) dream-sequence song filmed in Dubai and its desert
- Lahoo Ke Do Rang (Indian; 1997) partly filmed in Dubai
- Vishwavidhaata (Indian; 1997)
- Naam (Indian; 1986) partly filmed in Dubai

== Emirati directors ==
- Abdulhalim Qayed
- Abdullah Hasan Ahmed
- Abdulla Al Junaibi
- Abdulla Al Kaabi
- Ahmed Zain
- Ali F. Mostafa
- Fayssal Bensahli
- Khaled Bensahli
- Jamal Salem
- Khaled Alrayhi
- Majid Abdulrazak
- Majid Al Ansari
- Nayla Al Khaja
- Nawaf Al-Janahi
- Saeed Salmeen Al-Murry
- Tariq Alkazim
- Rakan
- Rawia Abdullah
- Waleed Al Shehhi
- Nahla Al Fahad
- Ibrahim Bin Mohamed
- Ali Bin Matar

== See also ==
- Arab cinema
- Egyptian cinema
- Cinema of Asia
- Cinema of the Middle East
