= Distinctive International Arab Festivals Awards =

Annual awards ceremony held in Dubai

- Awarded for: Outstanding achievements for international and Arab personalities
- Location: Dubai
- Country: United Arab Emirates
- First award: 2017; 9 years ago
- Website: diafa.org

The Distinctive International Arab Festivals Awards (DIAFA) is an annual awards show held in Dubai, UAE. It honors distinguished International and Arab personalities in recognition of their annual achievements and contribution towards committees and society betterment. The first edition of DIAFA was held in 2017.

== Winners ==
The winners' professions and countries of origin are selected by diafa.org.

=== 2017 ===
The 1st edition of DIAFA was held in January 2017.

- Abdul Hamid Juma - DIFF, UAE
- Ali Al Khawar - Poet, UAE
- Elissa - Singer, Lebanon
- Majid Al Mohandis - Singer, Saudi Arabia
- Fadia Al Taweel - Journalist, UAE
- Abed Fahed - Actor, Syria
- Latifa - Singer, Tunisia
- Youssra - Actress, Egypt
- Khaled Youssef - Director, Egypt
- Mohamed Saeed Harib - Director, UAE
- Nurgül Yeşilçay - Actress, Turkey
- Rima Njeim - Presenter, Lebanon
- Habib Ghloom - Actor, UAE
- Zaha Hadid - Artichect, Iraq
- Khaled - Singer, Algeria

=== 2018 ===
The 2nd edition of DIAFA was held in January 2018.

- Wael Kfoury – Singer, Lebanon
- Elçin Sangu – Actress, Turkey
- Hayat Al-Fahad – Actress, Kuwait
- Bassel Khaiat – Actor, Syria
- B. R. Shetty – Businessman, India
- Omar Kamal – Singer, Palestine
- Dorra Zarrouk – Actress, Tunisia
- Irina Bokova – Former director general of UNESCO, Bulgaria
- Arina Domski – Opera singer, Ukraine
- Mattar Bin Lahej – Sculptor, UAE
- Fayez Al Saeed – Singer and composer, UAE
- Turki Aldakhil – journalist, Saudi Arabia
- Waleed Nassif – Director, Lebanon
- Raha Moharrak – Sportwoman, Saudi Arabia
- ABU – Star of the Year – Singer, Egypt

=== 2019 ===
The 3rd edition of DIAFA was held in February 2019.

- Dareen Barbar and Arz Zahreddine – Athletes, Lebanon
- Ali F. Mostafa – Director, UAE
- Samira Said – Singer, Morocco
- SABREEN – Actress, Egypt
- Sirusho – Singer, Armenia
- Engin Altan Düzyatan – Actor, Turkey
- Haifa Hussein – Actress, UAE
- Medhat El Adl – Actor, writer and poet, Egypt
- RedOne – Singer and composer, Morocco
- Cyrine Abdelnour – Actress, Lebanon
- Saber Rebaï – Singer, Tunisia
- Mahira Khan – Actress, Pakistan
- Haya Abdulsalam – Actress, Kuwait
- Ayman Zeidan – Actor, Syria
- Nelly Karim – Actress, Egypt
- Mike Angelo – Singer and actor, Thailand
- Wafa Bin Khalifa – Humanitarian, Saudi Arabia
- Huda Riyami – Painter, UAE

=== 2020 ===
The 4th edition of DIAFA was held in November 2020 during COVID-19 while respecting all the safety measurements and resulting in zero infections among all the attendees.

- UNHCR - UN entity, United Nations
- Sheikha Alyaziya Bint Nahyan Al Nahyan - Director, UAE
- Mustafa Agha - Journalist, Syria
- Song Yinxi - Director, China
- Abdul Mohsen Al Nemr - Actor, KSA
- Diana Haddad - Singer, Lebanon
- Latifa - Singer, Tunisia
- Maxim Khalil - Actor, Syria
- Amjad Abu Ala - Director, Sudan
- Laila Aziz - Fashion designer, Morocco
- Yara- Singer, Lebanon
- Sajal Ahad Mir - Actress, Pakistan
- Mohamed Ramadan (actor and singer) - Actor, Egypt
- Ammar Omar - Businessman, Sudan
- Michele Morrone - Actor & Singer, Italy
- Elseed - Street artist, Tunisia
- Mansoor Elfeeli - Actor, UAE
- Fatma Al Hachemi - Singer, UAE
- Mustapha Al Abdallah - Singer, Iraq
- Saudi German Hospital - Medical sector, UAE
- Gims - Singer, COD
- Iveta Mukuchian - Singer, Armenia

=== 2021 ===
The 5th edition of DIAFA was held on November 28, 2021, kicking off the celebration of the UAE's 50th anniversary.

- H.E. Dr. Mohamed Saeed Al Kindi - UAE Former Minister of Environment and Water, United Arab Emirates
- Radwa El Sherbiny - Journalist, Egypt
- Neslihan Atagül - Actress, Turkey
- Nahla Al Fahad - Director, UAE
- Magda Zaki - Actor, Egypt
- Nawal El Zoghbi - Singer, Lebanon
- Angham - Singer, Egypt
- Saif Nabeel - Singer, Iraq
- Yasser Al Qahtani - Athlete, KSA
- Khalid Al Razooqi - UAE Police Officer, UAE
- Iyad Al Rimawi- Musician, Syria
- Laila Eloui - Actress, Egypt
- Lojain Omran - Journalist, KSA
- Jamila Saadouni - Businesswoman, Morocco
- Melhem Zein - Singer, Lebanon
- Dr. Parween Habib - Journalist & Author, Bahrain
- Elham El Fadhalah - Actor, Kuwait
- Antonio Signorini - Sculptor, Italy

=== 2022 ===
- Mohammed Sheikh Suliman - Businessman, Palestine

=== 2023 ===
The 7th edition of DIAFA was held on 22 November 2023 at Festival Bay, Dubai Festival City.

- Saad Lmjarred - Singer, Morocco
- Ali Zafar - Singer, Pakistan
- Nadia Al Gendy - Actress, Egypt
- Nargis Fakhri - Actress
- Aditi Rao Hyderi - Actress, IndiaSoolking
- Pamela El Kik - Actress, Lebanon
- Adnan Al Kateb - Journalist, United Kingdom
- Jacqueline Fernandez - Actress, Sri Lanka
- Soolking - Singer, Algeria
- Amir Karara - Actor, Egypt
- Mahmod Al Turky - Singer, Iraq
- Carole Samaha - Singer, Lebanon
- Georges Khabbaz - Actor, Lebanon
- Huda Hussein - Actress, Iraq
- Elham Ali - Actress, Saudi Arabia
- Fatmah Lootah - Artist, UAE
