= Majid Al Ansari =

Emirati filmmaker

Majid Al Ansari ماجد الأنصاري
- Born: Majid Al Ansari; 1987 (age 38–39); United Arab Emirates
- Occupations: Director, producer, writer, editor, production manager
- Years active: 2000–present

Majid Al Ansari (born 1987), is an Emirati filmmaker recognized as one of the leading voices in contemporary Arab genre cinema. He first gained international attention with his debut feature Zinzana: Rattle the Cage, a critically acclaimed thriller noted for its stylish direction and tightly contained storytelling. Al Ansari later directed several episodes of Paranormal (2020), Netflix's Egyptian original series, further cementing his reputation as a boundary-pushing genre storyteller in the region.

In 2025, he released The Vile, a psychological-supernatural horror film that became the first Emirati feature to screen at the Sitges Film Festival. The film premiered at Fantastic Fest, where it won Best Horror Feature, and went on to screen at the BFI London Film Festival. With The Vile, Al Ansari continued to expand the presence of Emirati cinema on the global stage, blending culturally rooted themes with bold, modern horror filmmaking.

== Personal life ==
Al Ansari was born in 1987 in Abu Dhabi, UAE to an Emirati father and Kuwaiti mother. Al Ansari studied music at California State University, Long Beach before entering cinema.

== Career ==
He started film at the Abu Dhabi Film Commission under David Shepherd. Then he moved to work at Image Nation in 2010. During this period, he moved to Africa and attended the Maisha Film Lab in Uganda, a non-profit training initiative for emerging East African film-makers. After returning to UAE, he made his maiden short film The Intruder!.

Ansari made his feature debut film Zinzana: Rattle the Cage in 2015. The film had its world premiere at Fantastic Fest in Austin, TX, and then European premier at BFI London Film Festival. The film received critical acclaim and later won the award for the Best Arab Filmmaker of the Year at the 2016 Berlin International Film Festival. The film was then picked up by IM Global for world-wide representation, and sold to Netflix as the first Arab film acquisition. The film is reportedly the first film of its genre to be produced in the United Arab Emirates. After the success of the film, he worked as an executive producer on three major Arab films: Shabab Sheyab, Rashid & Rajab, and Scales - which premiered at the Venice International Film Festival Critics Week in 2019 and won the Club Verona award for most innovative film.

In 2020, Majid directed three episodes of the acclaimed Netflix series Paranormal. The series, based on Ahmed Khaled Tawfik's renowned novels, was the first Egyptian original series for the global streaming platform and was a top trending series following its November release.

In 2025, he returned to feature filmmaking with The Vile, a psychological-supernatural horror film. The film premiered at Fantastic Fest, where it won Best Horror Feature, before screening at the BFI London Film Festival. The Vile later became the first Emirati film to screen at the Sitges Film Festival, solidifying Al Ansari's position as a pioneering figure in Arab genre cinema.

== Partial filmography ==
Year	Film	Role	Genre	Ref.
2011	Sea Shadow	Trainee assistant location manager	Film	
2011	The Intruder!	Director, producer, writer, editor	Short film	
2013	Djinn	Assistant location manager	Film	
2014	From A to B	Executive producer	Film	
2015	Zinzana: Rattle the Cage	Director, writer	Film	
2018	On Borrowed Time	Executive producer	Film	
2017–18	Justice: Qalb Al Adala	Executive producer	TV series	
2019	Rashid & Rajab	Executive producer	Film	
2019	Scales	Executive producer	Film	
2020	Paranormal	Director	TV series	
2024	Hwjn	Executive producer	Film	
2024	Kaboos	Director, Executive producer	TV series	
2025	The Vile	Director	Film	
2025	Hoba			
