= Fatima Al Safi =

Kuwaiti actress

Fatma Alsafi
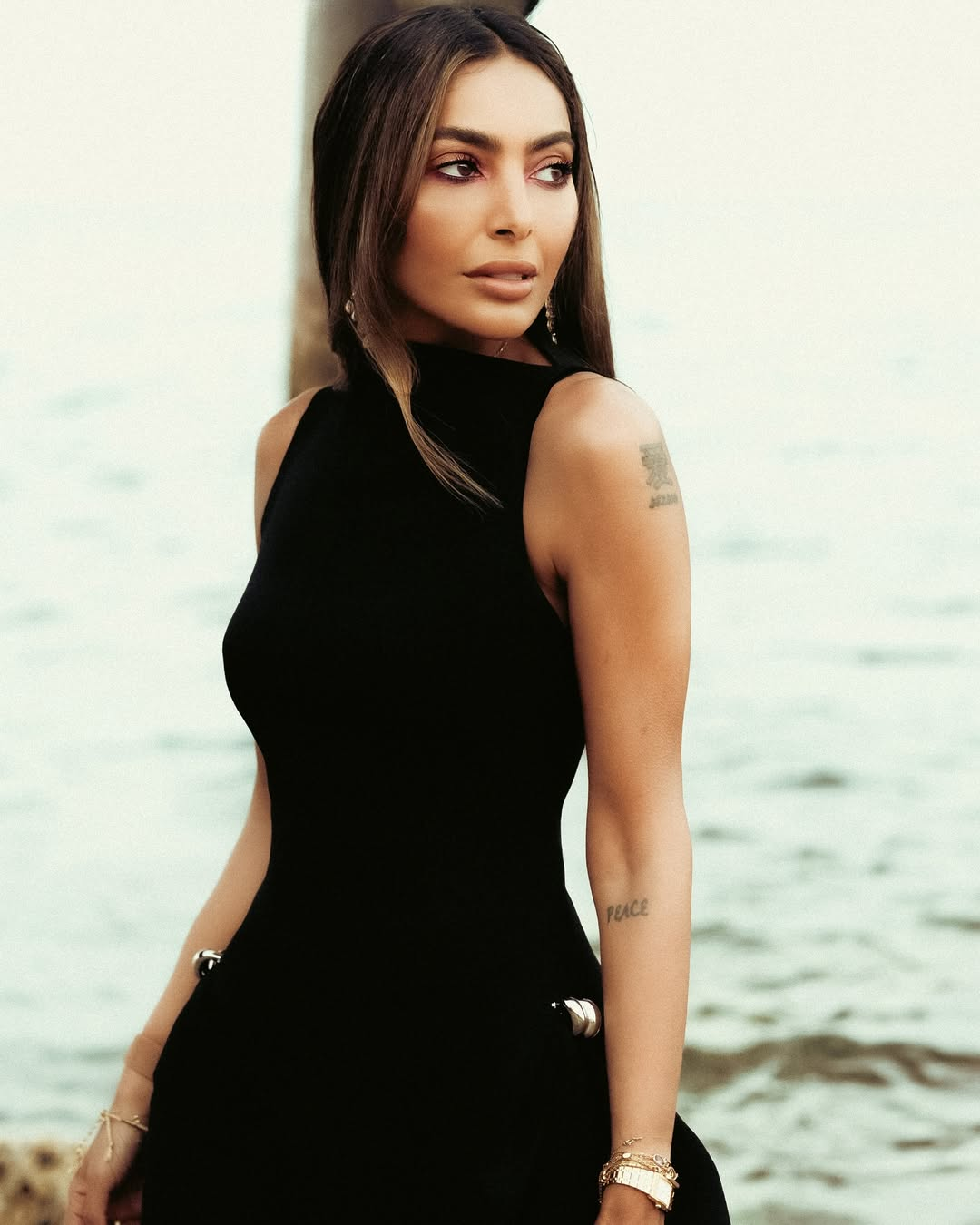
- Fatma Alsafi
- Born: November 17, 1981 (age 44); Kuwait
- Occupation: Actress
- Years active: 2007–present

Fatma Al Safi (Arabic: فاطمة الصفي) is a Kuwaiti actress born on November 17, 1981.

She graduated from the Higher Institute of Dramatic Arts in 2005, specializing in acting and directing. Al Safi began her career in academic theatre before transitioning to television, gaining recognition for her roles in series such as Omaima fi Dar Al Aytam and Zawarat Al Khamis. She also directed several musical and television works. Beyond her acting career,

== Career ==
She holds a bachelor's degree in acting and directing from the Higher Institute of Theatrical Arts, class of 2005. She directed musical productions and television programs.

Her first television role was a supporting character in "Al‑Khurrāz" (2007) alongside Hayat Al‑Fahad. However, her breakthrough and success came with the series Fadha Qalbha Abyad, where she starred with actress Souad Abdullah, who played the role of Fadha. This role paved the way for her to land leading roles thereafter. She also formed a duo with actress Shujoun Al-Hajri in several television and theatrical productions.

== Personal life ==
She married film director Sami Bilal, a fellow graduate, and the marriage lasted five years prior to her television career.

== Works ==
=== Television ===
Year of Production	Name of the Series	Character
2007	Al-Kharaz	Muna
2007	Balagh Lil-Ra'i Al-'Aam (Statement to the Public)	
2008	Fadha Qalbha Abyad (Fadha with a Pure Heart)	Maleeka
2008	Al-Fateen (The Clever One)	Budoor
2009	Umm Al-Banat (Mother of the Girls)	Muneera
2009	Al-Hob Al-Kabeer (The Great Love)	Fatma
2009	Wa 'Ad Al-Madi (The Past Has Returned)	Zahra
2010	Noor fi Sama' Safiya (Light in a Clear Sky)	Ghadeer
2010	Zuwarat Al-Khamees (Thursday Visits)	Zaina
2010	Umayma fi Dar Al-Aytam (Umayma in the Orphanage)	Sabeeka
2010	Qissat Hawana (Our Love Story)	Many characters
2011	Bukraym Bi Raqabtah Sab' Hareem	Fairuz
2011	Akhbar Al-Batata – Program	Many characters
2012	Majmou'at Insan	Ruqaya
2012	Kinnat Al-Sham wa Kanayin Al-Shamiya	Nadia
2012	Mudhakkarat 'A'iliyya Jiddan ( Very Family-Oriented Diaries )	Farah
2013	Sir Al-Hawa ( The Secret of Love )	Farah
2013	Borkan Na'em: Qulub Min Nar (Soft Volcano: Hearts of Fire)	Kifaah
2013	Borkan Na'em: Nihayat Gharam (Soft Volcano: The End of a Love)	Huda
2014	Sadiqat Al-'Umr ( Lifelong Friends )	Hind
2014	Lil-Hob Kalima ( A Word for Love )	Aaya
2014	Maskanak Yufi	Rasha
2014	Anisa Al-Waneesa	Aneesa
2015	Sadiqati Al-'Azizat ( My Dear Friends )	Shaikha
2015	Al-'Amm Saqr (Uncle Saqr)	Eman
2015	Ummuna Ruwayhat Al-Janna	Fouziyah
2015	Dhakirat Min Waraq ( A Memory Made of Paper )	Noura
2016	Nawayya ( Intentions )	Lateefa
2016	Saq Al-Bamboo( The Bamboo Stalk )	Hind
2016	Sudasiyat Hikayat	Awatef / Bashayer / Taiba
2017	Thikrayat La Tamoot ( Memories Never Die )	Badriya
2017	Kan Fi Kul Zaman ( Once Upon Every Time )	Many characters
2018	Ezwati ( My Strength )	Nour
2018	Block Ghashmara	Alfaris Almolatham
2018	Abrat Shari'e	Fatma
2018	Hum Nawayya	Lateefa
2019	Balani Zamani	Many characters
2019	Dof'at Al-Qahira ( Cairo Batch )	Dalal
2019	Ana 'Indi Nass ( I Have a Script )	Samiya
2019	Wa Ma Adraka Ma Ummi ( And What Do You Know About My Mother )	Mai
2020	Umm Haroun (Mother of Haroun)	Mariam
2020	Dof'at Beirut ( Beirut Batch )	Shaha
2021	Amnesia	Maha / Nawal
2021	Anbar 6 (Cell Block 6)	Ahlam
2023	Milh wa Samra	Ekhlas
2024	Zawja Wahida La Takfi ( One Wife Is Not Enough )	Alya
2024	Fi'l Madi ( Past Tense )	
2025	Umm 44(Mother of 44)	Haya
2026	Ghumaidha ( Hide and seek )	Shadia

=== Theater ===
Year of Production	The Play	Character
2006	Hena Toulad Al-Ahlam (When Dreams Are Born)	
2007	Al-Zafaf (The Wedding)	Wife
2008	Abtal Al-Fareej (Heroes of the Neighborhood)	Maryam
2008	Bela Malameh (Without Features)	
2008	Al-Ameerah Wa Al-Toufah (The Princess and the Apple)	
2008	Al-Montatheroun Fi Al-Kharij (The Ones Waiting Outside)	
2009	Titania	
2009	Madinat Al-Zalam (City of Darkness)	Fatma
2010	Hayyal Bu Tair	Dinar
2010	Khams Khawat wa Sayyad ( Five Sisters and a Hunter )	Kasoola
2011	ABC123	Fatma
2011	Zain ila 'Aalam Jameel ( Zain to a Beautiful World )	Hamama
2012	Misbah Zain ( Zain's Lamp )	Yasmeena
2013	Man Minhum Huwa? (Which One is He?)	Lady Macbeth
2013	Zain wal Wahsh ( Zain and the Beast )	Ebreeka
2014	Zain Al-Bihar ( Zain the Seas )	Sharshoura
2015	Zain Al-Awtan ( Zain of the Homelands )	Zain
2016	Zain Al-Adghal (Zain of the Jungle)	Rashaaka
2016	Al-'A'ilah Al-Hazina (The Sad Family)	Sarka
2017	Zain 'Uqlat Al-Isbu' ( Zain and the Thumbelina )	Farfoura
2018	Sona'a fi Zain ( Made in Zain )	Jaljala
2019	Al-Lawha Al-Sihriyya (The Magic Painting)	Luluwa
2019	Zain wal Aqzam Al-Thamaniyah( Zain and the Eight Dwarfs )	Ghadhbana
2022	Zain Lil-Abad (Zain Forever)	Qeshrat Basala
2023	La Shay' Abadan Kazain (Nothing Ever Like Zain)	Tufaiha
2025	Zain Allati La Takhaf (Zain Who Does Not Fear)	Kalaklaka
2026	Ameerat Galbi Zain ( Princess of my heart, Zain )	Hum

=== Cinema ===
Year of Production	The Movie	Character
2014	Kan Rfiji ( He Was My Friend )	
2018	Sarb Al-Hamam (The Dove Flock)	

== Awards ==
She has received several awards throughout her artistic career:

- Best Supporting Actress Award from the Mohammed Abdulmohsen Al-Kharafi Festival for Theatrical Creativity for the play When Dreams Are Born.
- Best Leading Actress Award from the Mohammed Abdulmohsen Al-Kharafi Festival for Theatrical Creativity for the play The Ones Waiting Outside.
- Best Leading Actress Award from the 9th Kuwait Theater Festival for the play The Wedding.
- Best Leading Actress Award from the 6th Al-Kharafi Theater Festival for the play Titania.
- Best Supporting Actress Award from the 10th Kuwait Theater Festival for the play Without Features.
- Best Leading Actress Award from the Asilah International Children's Theater Festival in Morocco for the play The Princess and the Apple.
