= Al Satwa =

Al Satwa السطوة
- Community
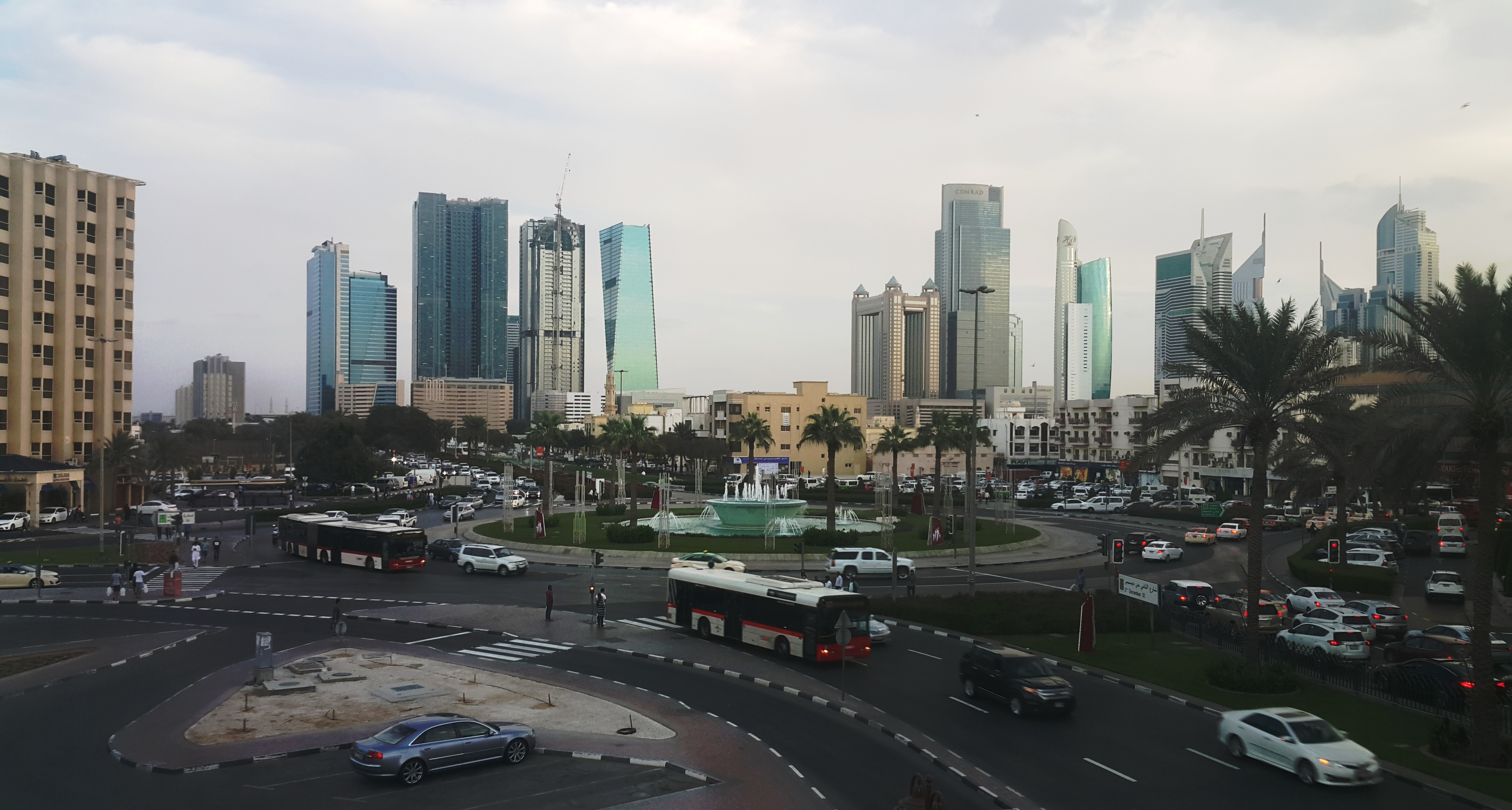
- Al Satwa Roundabout
- Interactive map of Al Satwa
- Coordinates: 25.21907°N 55.27256°E
- Country: United Arab Emirates
- Emirate: Dubai
- City: Dubai

Area
  - Total: 2.87 km^{2} (1.11 sq mi)

Population (2017)
  - Total: 40,958
  - Density: 14,300/km^{2} (37,000/sq mi)
- Community number: 334

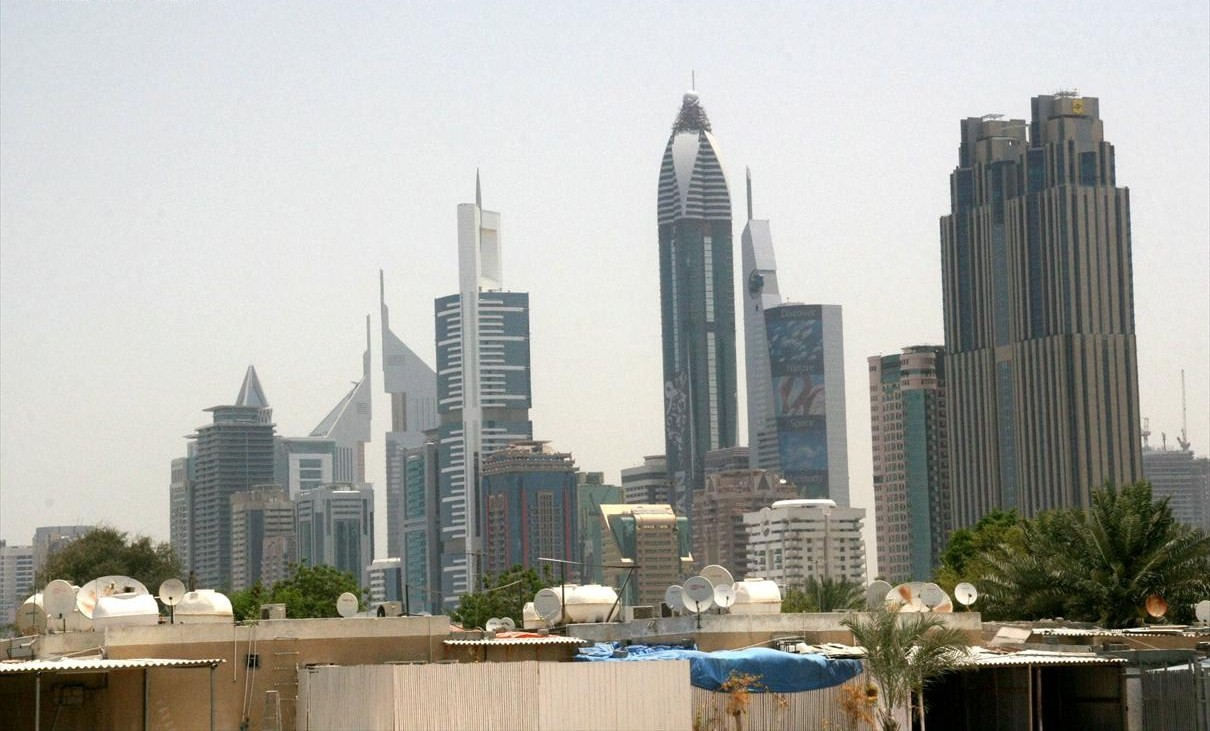
View of the skyline along Sheikh Zayed Road from Satwa

Al Satwa (Arabic: السطوة) or simply Satwa, is a community in Dubai, United Arab Emirates, comprising high-density retail outlets and private residential dwellings. It is situated southwest of Bur Dubai and borders Jumeirah to the north. E 11 (Sheikh Zayed Road) forms the southern boundary of Al Satwa. Notable landmarks include the Iranian Hospital, Satwa Grand Mosque and the Al Satwa bus terminal.

Originally, the residents of Al Satwa were mainly of the Baloch tribe. As the government provided better housing for Emiratis, only few Arabs continue to reside here. Al Satwa is known for its large and vibrant South Asian and Filipino community. It is often referred to as "Mini-Manila" by the Dubai Filipino community.

Al Satwa is the subject of the critically acclaimed spoken word piece/photo-novella, Satwa stories, by Mahmoud Kaabour and Denise Holloway of Veritas Films. The project highlights the hidden gems and iconic characters of the Satwa neighborhood through poetry, photography, and music.

== Parody video ==
In November 2013, police arrested a US citizen and some UAE citizens in connection with a YouTube parody video which allegedly portrayed Dubai in bad light. The parody video titled 'The Deadly Satwa GS' was shot in areas of Al Satwa and depicted gangs learning how to fight using simple weapons, such as shoes and the aghal.
