= Satwa Stories =

Satwa Stories is a spoken word piece/photo-novella that was created and produced by Mahmoud Kaabour and Denise Holloway. It was presented at Pecha Kucha in June 2008 at The Third Line Gallery in al Quoz in Dubai, United Arab Emirates.

The project is a poetic exploration of the hidden gems and iconic characters of the al Satwa neighborhood in Dubai. It is a sequence of 20 artistic photographs, overlaid with a spoken word performance by Mahmoud Kaabour and live music. In the words of Kaabour, it is “a form of celebratory archive before Satwa gets buried. There is no shame in progress, but it’s important to keep track of the cycle of development, whether its through architecture or photographic records.”

During the heavy publicity generated by 'Satwa Stories,'" the filmmakers of Veritas Films announced that they were developing the concept further through an original television series entitled My Neighborhood'," which explores Dubai neighborhood by neighborhood through documentary film encounters to tell the stories of the real people who live and work in the city. The series is currently in development.

== Artists ==
Mahmoud Kaabour is the founder and managing director of Veritas Films, a production company based in the United Arab Emirates. Denise Holloway is a Canadian film-maker who has been based in Dubai since 2003. The project was made possible with the collaboration of photographer Siddharth Siva and double-bassist Nabil Amarshi.

Pecha Kucha Night was a format conceived by Tokyo architects Astrid Klein and Mark Dytham. It is a forum for creative public exhibition which is replicated globally in approximately 100 cities.
