= From A to B (film) =

- From A to B movie poster
- Directed by: Ali F. Mostafa
- Written by: Ali F. Mostafa
- Screenplay by: Mohamed Hefzy
- Produced by: Paul Baboudjian; Mohamed Hefzy; Ronnie Khalil; Ali F. Mostafa
- Starring: Fahad Albutairi; Shadi Alfons; Fadi Rifaai; Khaled Abolnaga; Wonho Chung
- Cinematography: Michel Dierickx
- Edited by: Ali Salloum
- Production companies: Rotana TV, Rotana Studios, twofour54, StudioCanal, Ashok Amritraj and Image Nation Abu Dhabi
- Distributed by: Rotana TV, Rotana Studios and Relativity Media (American Release)
- Release dates: 23 October 2014 (Abu Dhabi Film Festival); 8 January 2015 (Abu Dhabi)
- Running time: 108 minutes
- Country: United Arab Emirates
- Languages: Arabic; English

From A to B is a 2014 multilingual Emirati film written, directed, and produced by Ali F. Mostafa. Set in the United Arab Emirates, the film revolves around three old friends (Jay, Rami & Omar) who travel on an adventurous road trip from Abu Dhabi to Beirut in memory of their lost friend Hadi.

== Cast ==
- Fahad Albutairi as Youssef 'Jay'
- Shadi Alfons as Rami
- Fadi Rifaai as Omar
- Khaled Abol Naga as Senior Syrian Officer
- Samer al-Masry as Syrian Rebel Leader
- Wonho Chung as Raed
- Leem Lubany as Shadya
- Maha Abou Ouf as Rami's Mother
- Yousra El Lozy as Arwa
- Abdulmohsen Alnemr as Youssef's Father
- Ali Suliman as Syrian Army Officer
- Madeline Zima as Samantha
- Ahd Kamel as Rana (credited as Ahd)
- Christina Wolfe as Julie (credited as Christina Ulfsparre)
- Ibrahim Alkhairallah as Mechanic
- Ibrahim Mursi as Saudi Officer
- Hisham Fageeh as Saudi Officer
- Iman Al Shaybani as Joanne
