= Justice: Qalb Al Adala =

2017 Arabic-language television series

- Genre: Drama; Trial; Legal drama
- Based on: Justice by: Tyler Bensinger; David McNally
- Starring: Mansoor Alfeeli; Khalifa al Bhri; Fatima Al Taei
- Music by: Reiner Erlings
- Composer: Trevor Morris
- Country of origin: United Arab Emirates
- Original languages: Arabic; English
- No. of seasons: 1
- No. of episodes: 18

Production
- Executive producer: Marc Lorber
- Camera setup: Single-camera
- Running time: 32–48 min.
- Production companies: Abu Dhabi Judicial Department; Abu Dhabi Film Commission; Beelink Productions; Image Nation Abu Dhabi; twofour54 intaj

Original release
- Network: OSN Yahala
- Release: 17 September 2017 – 14 January 2018

Related
- Justice

Justice: Qalb Al Adala (Arabic: قلب العدالة) is a 2017 Arabic-language television series starring Mansoor Alfeeli, Khalifa al Bhri and Fatima Al Taei. The plot revolves around Farah (Fatima Al Taei), who studies law in the United States and returns to her hometown of Abu Dhabi to practice her profession. Her father Hasan (Mansoor Al Feeli) wants her to work for the family's firm, but Farah is determined to open her own practice. The series is based on the American television series Justice.

== Cast ==
- Mansoor Al Feeli as Mr. Hassan
- Khalifa al Bhri as Rashid
- Fatima Al Taei as Farah
- Neven Madi as Leila
- Mohamed Al-Amiri as Khaled

== Release ==
Justice: Qalb Al Adala was released on September 17, 2017 on OSN Ya Hala Al Oula.
