= Huda Hussein =

Iraqi actress and producer

Huda Hussain هدى حسين
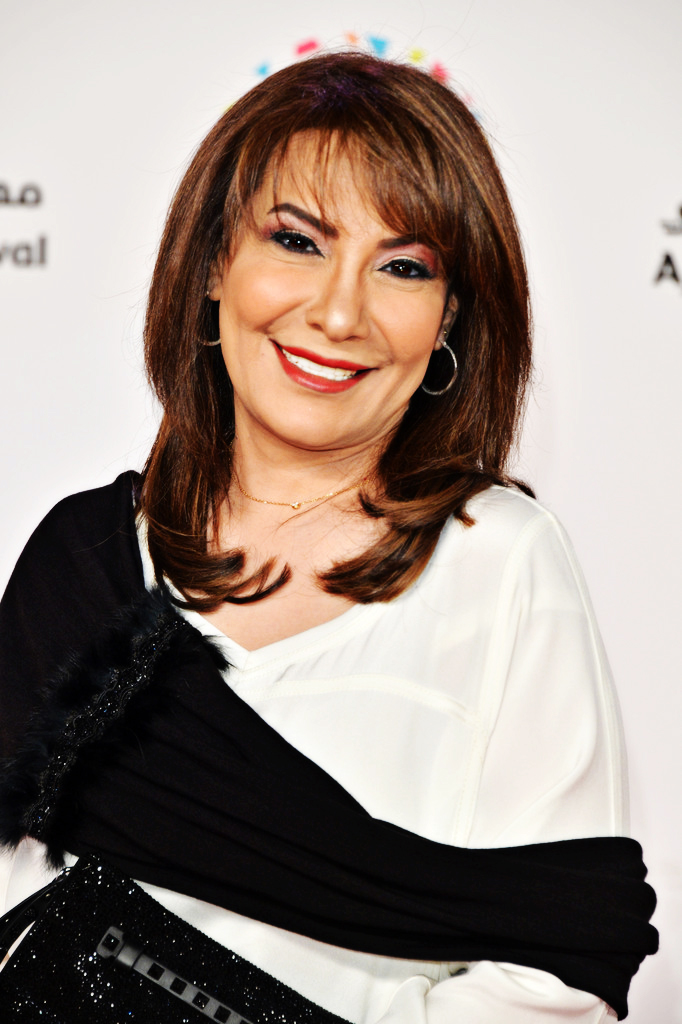
- Born: Huda Hussain Ali Radhi; August 20, 1965 (age 61); Kuwait City, Kuwait
- Occupations: Actress, producer
- Years active: 1972–present
- Spouse: Abdulaziz Al-Qattan (m. 2000; div. 2001)

Huda Hussain (Arabic: هدى حسين; born August 20, 1965) is an Iraqi actress and producer born and residing in Kuwait. She is the third name on demand in Gulf TV after Hayat Al-Fahad and Souad Abdullah.

== Early life ==
Huda Hussein Ali Al-Radi was born in Kuwait City on August 20, 1965. Her father was an Iraqi who was employed at the Iraqi Ministry of Education; he died when Huda was ten years old. Her sister Suad Hussein is also an actress.

== Career ==
When she was four years old, Hussein appeared in Nawader Juha and was involved in radio production Mama Anisa. Her first stage role came with Arab Theater Group's production Nora, directed by Fouad Al-Shatti. Its success led to other roles and she was cast in Sindabad by Mahfouz Abdul Rahman, Arabic adaptations of Alice in Wonderland and Cindrella. She also produced the musical play Laila and the Nile, written by Abdullatif Al-Bannai.

Some of the famous TV series she has starred in include : Al Malika (2011), Khadimaatul Qawm . (2012), Joud (2016), Iqbal Yom Aqbltt . (2017), Kff Wa Dfoof. (2021), Min Shaare'e Al Haram Ila ...(2022), Melh Wa Samra (2023), Sit Al Hessen (2022), The Cursed House (2024) .

== Personal life ==
Hussein married TV host Abdul Aziz Al-Qattan but the couple separated soon after Al-Qattan's return to Kuwait.

Her studies were interrupted due to Iraq's Invasion of Kuwait. Later, she received her degree in English literature from the Arab Open University, Kuwait in 2010.
