= Hoba =

2025 Emirati psychological horror film

- Directed by: Majid Al Ansari
- Screenplay by: Majid Al Ansari; Johnnie Alward
- Story by: Majid Al Ansari
- Produced by: Derek Dauchy; Roy Lee; Steven Schneider; Rami Yasin
- Starring: Bdoor Mohammad; Jasem AlKharraz; Iman Tarik; Sarah Taibah
- Production companies: Image Nation Studios; Spooky Pictures; Breakout Films
- Distributed by: Telfaz11 (Saudi Arabia); Dark Sky Films (United States)
- Release dates: September 20, 2025 (Fantastic Fest); October 30, 2025 (United Arab Emirates); November 20, 2026 (United States)
- Running time: 97 minutes
- Countries: United Arab Emirates; United States
- Language: Arabic

Hoba (stylized in all caps; also known as The Vile) is a 2025 supernatural psychological horror film written and directed by Majid Al Ansari. The film follows a woman who descends into paranoia after her husband brings home a second wife, sensing a dark presence following the other woman. It was based on an original screenplay written by Al Ansari and Johnnie Alward and stars Bdoor Mohammad, Sarah Taibah, and Iman Tarik.

The film was produced by Image Nation Abu Dhabi and Spooky Pictures. Hoba premiered at Fantastic Fest on September 20, 2025 in Austin, Texas. After playing at festivals, it was released theatrically in the United Arab Emirates on October 30, 2025 by, and is set to be released theatrically and on digital on November 20, 2026 by Dark Sky Films.

== Synopsis ==
Amani (Bdoor Mohammad), a wife and mother living in suburban Abu Dhabi, finds her husband Khalid (Jasem AlKharraz) returning home with a pregnant second wife, Zahra (Sarah Taibah), without her knowledge or consent. Feeling betrayed, Amani tries to reassert herself as the household's matriarch as her daughter, Noor (Iman Tarik), begins growing closer to Zahra after being bullied at school. After seemingly paranormal events, Amani's sanity unravels, as she becomes convinced that a malevolent supernatural presence has followed Zahra into their household.

== Cast ==
- Bdoor Mohammad as Amani
- Jasem AlKharraz as Khalid
- Iman Tarik as Noor
- Sarah Taibah as Zahra

== Production ==
=== Development ===
Hoba was directed by Majid Al Ansari. Al Ansari cited Fatal Attraction and What Ever Happened to Baby Jane? as his inspirations for the film, which explores themes such as polygamy, greed, betrayal, and trauma.

=== Filming and collaboration ===
The film was produced by Image Nation Abu Dhabi and Spooky Pictures. It was the first Arabic-language Emirati film co-produced by the two companies. Steven Schneider and Roy Lee served as producers and provided creative input. Additional producers include Derek Dauchy and Rami Yasin, with Mohamed Hefzy and Yasir Al Yasiri serving as executive producers.

== Release ==
=== Film festivals ===
Hoba had its world premiere at Fantastic Fest on September 20, 2025 at the Alamo Drafthouse in Austin, Texas, in September 2025. In October 2025, the film was screened at the Sitges Film Festival in Spain and the BFI London Film Festival. In December 2025, the film was also screened at the Gulf Film Festival.

The film was also screened at the Emirates Airline Festival of Literature in January 2026, where Al Ansari participated in a Q&A following the screening.

=== Theatrical release ===
Hoba was released in UAE cinemas on October 30, 2025. The film opened in Saudi Arabia in November 2025, and was distributed by Telfaz11. In October 2026, it was announced that Dark Sky Films had acquired U.S. distribution rights for the film and is set to be released theatrically and on digital on November 20, 2026.

== Reception ==
The film received positive reviews from critics, including coverage in Variety and Deadline. On the review aggregator Rotten Tomatoes, it has an approval rating of 100% based on 11 reviews.

=== Accolades ===
Award / Festival	Year	Category	Result	Ref.
Fantastic Fest	2025	Best Horror Feature	Won	
