= Rattle the Cage =

- Directed by: Majid Al Ansari
- Written by: Ruckus Skye; Lane Skye
- Produced by: Rula Nasser; Rami Yasin
- Starring: Saleh Bakri; Ali Suliman; Yasa; Ahd
- Cinematography: Colin Lévêque
- Edited by: Shahnaz Dulaimy
- Music by: Jerry Lane; Trevor Gureckis
- Production company: Imagenation Abu Dhabi FZ
- Release date: 10 December 2015
- Running time: 96 minutes
- Country: United Arab Emirates
- Language: Arabic

Rattle the Cage (also known as Zinzana, meaning "cell" in Arabic) is a 2015 crime thriller film directed and co-written by Majid Al Ansari. It is reportedly the first film of its genre to be produced in the United Arab Emirates.

== Plot ==
The film is about a man, held in a cell in a remote police station for a minor disturbance, who becomes involuntarily involved in a plan by a corrupt and violent police officer.

== Cast ==
- Saleh Bakri as Talal
- Ali Suliman as Dabaan
- Yasa as Aida
- Ahd Kamel as Wafa (credited as Ahd)
- Abdall Bu Abed as Sherif Usman
- Eyad Hourani as Kassab (credited as Iyad Hoorani)

== Reception ==
The film was called a "world-class neo-noir thriller" by Joe Leydon writing for Variety (magazine). It was also praised by the reviewers for Huffington Post and The Austin Chronicle.
