= Ahd Kamel =

Saudi Arabian actress and filmmaker

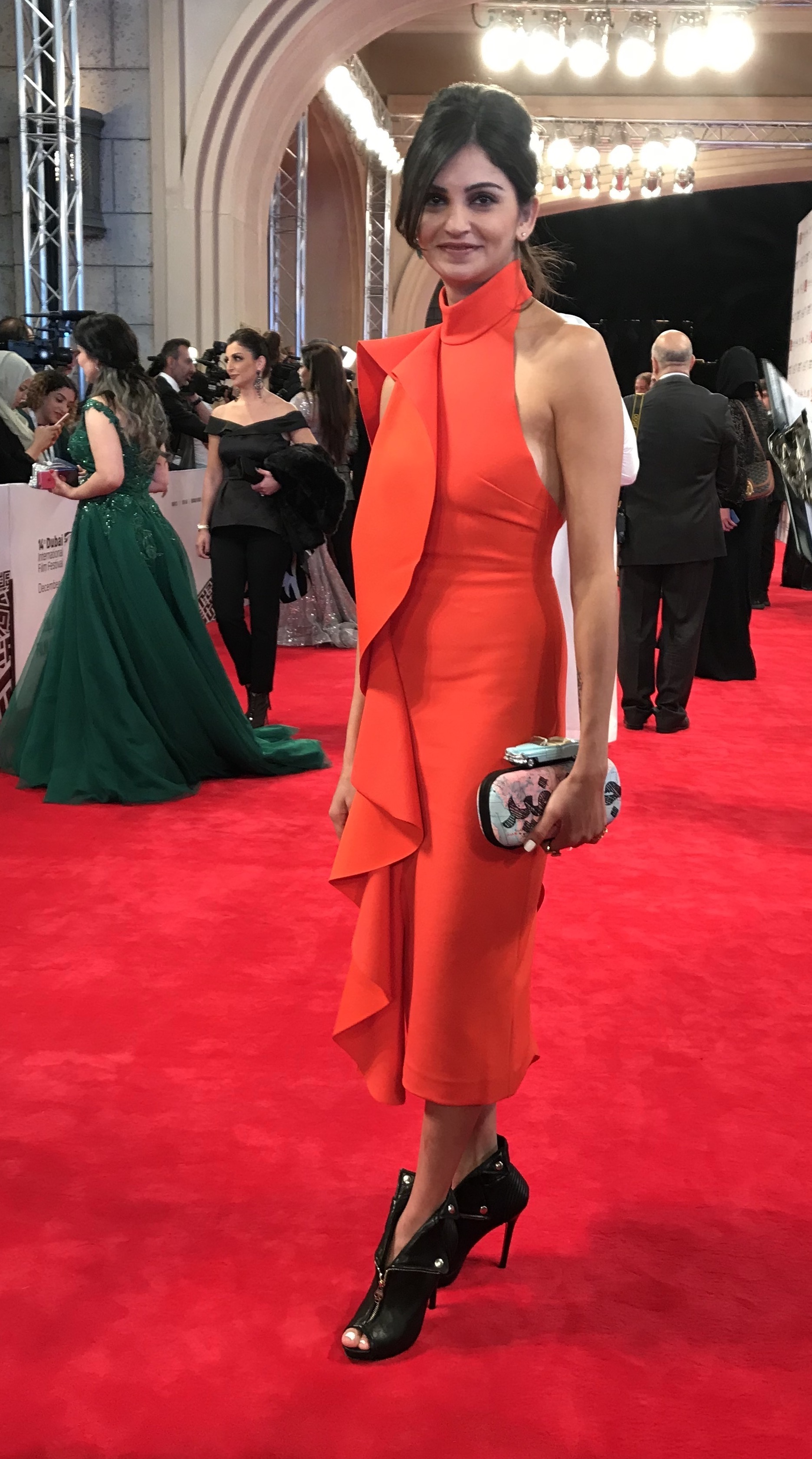
- Born: Ahd Hassan Kamel; November 14, 1980 (age 45); Riyadh, Saudi Arabia
- Education: Parsons School Of Design
- Occupations: Actress, Filmmaker
- Years active: 2007 - Present

Ahd Hassan Kamel (Arabic: عهد حسن كامل) is an actress and filmmaker from Jeddah, Saudi Arabia. She is known for her role in the BAFTA-nominated film, Wadjda (2014) and for her role as Fatima in BBC Two's Collateral (2018).

== Education and Career ==
Kamel grew up in Saudi Arabia and moved to New York City in 1998. She received a BFA in Animation & Communication from Parsons School of Design in 2004 and a Directing degree from the New York Film Academy in 2005. Kamel then went on to study acting under the personal tutelage of William Esper at the William Esper Studio.

As an Actor, Ahd has featured in numerous films and TV series, including a starring role in the 2014 BAFTA-nominated film Wadjda, and roles in productions for BBC, ITV, Netflix, Amazon Prime, Hulu and MBC.

Kamel has written, directed and acted in her two award-winning short films, The Shoemaker ‘Al-Gondorji’ (2009) and Sanctity ‘Hurma’ (2012).

The themes of these films explore women issues in Saudi Arabia. As Hurma explores a widowed woman's attempts to save her unborn baby with limited means. The film was a selection of the Berlin International Film Festival.

Ahd wrote and directed her award-winning feature film 'My Driver and I, which debuted at the 2024 Red Sea International Film Festival. Inspired by her childhood, the film unfolds against the backdrop of Jeddah in the 1980s and ’90s and traces the relationship of a rebellious girl and her Sudanese chauffeur.

Ahd received the Red Sea Honoree Award at the 2025 Red Sea International Film Festival.

== Filmography ==
CINEMA

Year	Film	Role	Notes
2006	Razan	Razan	
2009	The Shoemaker	Nidal	Writer/Director
2010	The Imperialists Are Still Alive!	Iraqi woman	
2011	Yara with the Long Blond Braid	Mother	
2012	Wadjda	Miss Hussa	
2013	Sanctity	Areej	Writer/Director
2013	Djinn	Um Al Duwais	Voice role
2014	From A to B	Rana	
2015	Rattle the Cage	Wafa	
2018	Run(a)Way Arab	Halima	
2019	Being	Agent Costa	
2022	All the Old Knives	Laila Maroof	
2024	My Driver and I		Writer/Director

TELEVISION

Year	Series	Role	Notes
2018	Collateral	Fatima Asif	
2019	The Rook	Samira	
2020	Honour	Diana Nammi	
2022	Ramy	Hanan	
2023–24	Concordia	Fatemah	

== Awards and nominations ==
- NOMINATED – Muhr Arab Award (The Shoemaker), Dubai International Film Festival, 2009
- WINNER - GOLDEN ALEPH for Best Short (The Shoemaker), Beirut International Film Festival, 2010
- WINNER – 2nd Prize, (The Shoemaker), Gulf Film Festival, Dubai, 2010
- WINNER - JURY AWARD (The Shoemaker), Oran Film Festival, Oran, Algeria 2010
- WINNER - Development Award (Sanctity) Doha Tribeca Film Festival, 2012
- NOMINATED – Golden Bear for Best Short (Sanctity) Berlinale 2013
- WINNER – 2nd Prize (Sanctity), Gulf Film Festival, Dubai, 2013
- WINNER - Best Feature Film (My Driver and I), 11th Saudi Film Festival, 2025
- WINNER - Feature Film Competition (My Driver and I), Sharjah Intl. Film Festival for Children and Youth 2025
- SPECIAL MENTION - Feature Film Competition (My Driver and I), Rotterdam Arab Film Festival 2025
- RED SEA HONOREE AWARD, Red Sea International Film Festival 2025

== Festival selections ==
The Shoemaker

- 2010 Clermont Ferrand Short Film Festival /France
- 2010 Brussels Short Film Festival
- 2010 Women in Film/Canada
- 2010 Festival Amal/Spain
- 2010 Abu Dhabi International Film Festival
- 2010 Arab Film Festival, San Francisco
- 2010 Women in Film, Seattle
- 2010 International Film Festival Bratislava/Slovak Republic
- 2010 Ljubljana International Film Festival
- 2010 Berlin Interfilm International Short Film Festival
- 2010 Kettupäivät Short Film Festival, Helsinki
- 2010 Karama Human Rights Film Festival, Amman

Sanctity

- 2013 Sarajevo Film Festival Shorts Program
- 2013 Berlinale Shorts Program

My Driver and I

- 2024 Red Sea International Film Festival
- 2025 International Arab Film Festival Zurich, Switzerland
- 2025 Diriyah Islamic Arts Biennale
- 2025 Saudi Film Festival
- 2025 Beirut International Women's Film Festival
- 2025 Rotterdam Arab Film Festival
- 2025 Sharjah Intl. Film Festival for Children and Youth 2025
