= Twofour54 =

Media company in Abu Dhabi

twofour54
- Formation: 2008
- Founder: Government Backed Initiative
- Headquarters: Abu Dhabi, United Arab Emirates
- Location: United Arab Emirates
- Parent organization: ADNEC Group (A MODON Company)
- Website: twofour54.com

twofour54 is a media and entertainment production company setup by Abu Dhabi government and located in Abu Dhabi, United Arab Emirates. Many major Hollywood productions have done production work in twofour54's facilities.

== Location and area ==
twofour54 is located in and named after the geographical coordinates of Abu Dhabi (24° N, 54° E), capital of the United Arab Emirates. The media free zone's main campus is located on the mainland (Yas Island). It also operates a 300,000 square meter backlot in Kizad and production studios in Mussafah, with Yas Creative Hub on Yas Island.

== Background ==
The media free zone twofour54 was founded in 2008. It falls under Abu Dhabi Development Holding Company's remit, as a government-backed media and creative industries hub. Former Universal executive Wayne Borg joined the company as chief commercial officer, a role in which he served until 2013.

In 2012, twofour54 took over the operation of the Abu Dhabi Film Festival, until its demise in 2015.

In February 2015, twofour54 entered into a strategic partnership with Ericsson, under which Ericsson acquired twofour54's playout operations. As part of the agreement, Ericsson established a broadcast and media services hub in Abu Dhabi aimed at serving broadcasters across the Middle East.

In May 2018, twofour54 organized the "Media Innovation Forum" in Abu Dhabi, highlighting the contributions of its partners in producing Arabic and English media content aimed at engaging the region's youth.

In 2020, Michael Garin was appointed CEO of twofour54.

The zone is home to a large number of international and local media companies, and offers infrastructure and support, such as end-to-end production services, government and travel services, 100% business ownership, and set-up and licensing.

twofour54 houses media companies in the audio, visual, and print industries, as well as news outlets and digital app creators. Their facilities also host the first CNN Academy.

As of 2020, more than 550 media companies and over 700 freelancers are based at twofour54, which has been involved in over 2,300 international major productions in Abu Dhabi.

In June 2020, twofour54 Abu Dhabi provided support to the media industry during the COVID-19 pandemic, including rent relief and remote work facilitation.

Notable films produced at twofour54 include Mission: Impossible – Fallout, 6 Underground and Bharat.

In 2021, Stillfront Group acquired Jawaker from Twofour54 Abu Dhabi for AED 753 million as part of its expansion in the Middle East.

In 2021, Twofour54 inaugurated the Yas Creative Hub, a purpose-built campus on Yas Island. It spans approximately 2.9 million square feet and it accommodates over 600 companies.

In April 2022, twofour54 Abu Dhabi launched an initiative to support digital content creators in the Middle East through training, mentorship, and access to production facilities.

In July 2022, twofour54 appointed Mark Whitehead as its CEO.

In September 2022, Twofour54 Abu Dhabi launched "The Community Hub" at Yas Creative Hub, a space designed to support gamers, filmmakers, and content creators with collaborative facilities.

In August 2023, Twofour54 announced plans to develop a new film studio complex in Abu Dhabi, scheduled to open in 2025.

== Past productions at twofour54 intaj ==
2010

- Teta, Alf Marra

2012

- The Bourne Legacy

2013

- Deliver Us from Evil

2014

- Baby
- Bang Bang!
- Star Wars: The Force Awakens
- Fast & Furious 7
- The Bold and the Beautiful
- Top Gear

2015

- War Machine
- The World Keeps Spinning

2016

- Dishoom

2017

- Justice: Qalb Al Adala
- Tiger Zinda Hai

2018

- Race 3
- Mission Impossible: Fallout (Gemini)

2019

- Saaho
- Bharat
- 6 Underground
- Mirage
- Ghost

2020

- Sonic the Hedgehog

2021

- Newton's Cradle
- The 45 Rules of Divorce
- Bunty Aur Babli 2
- Dune

2022

- Heropanti 2
- Vikram Vedha

2023

- Bloody Daddy
- Mission: Impossible – Dead Reckoning Part One

2024

- Dune: Part Two

2025

- War 2

== Notable companies at twofour54 ==
- CNN
- Edelman
- Euronews
- Fox News
- Forbes
- M&C Saatchi
- The National (Abu Dhabi)
- Oracle
- Russia Today
- Sky News Arabia
- Sports 360
- Ubisoft

== See also ==
- Dubai Media City
- Dubai Production City
- IMPZ
- Creative City
- Abu Dhabi Developmental Holding Company
- Abu Dhabi Film Commission
