= Mohammed Sheikh Suliman =

Palestinian businessman and horse breeder

- Born: Nazareth, Israel
- Education: Istanbul University (MA)
- Occupations: businessman horse breeder
- Awards: 2022 Best Businessman of the Year (Distinctive International Arab Festivals Awards)

Mohammed Sheikh Suliman (Arabic: محمد الشيخ سليمان; born in Nazareth, Israel) is a Palestinian businessman and horse breeder. In 2022, he was named the Best Businessman of the Year by the Distinctive International Arab Festivals Awards.

== Early life and education ==
He completed his primary and secondary education at the Franciscan Sisters' School in Nazareth and later pursued a degree in business administration and public management, graduating in 2015.

Suliman earned his Bachelor's degree in economics and business administration from the Open University. He subsequently pursued his studies in political science and international relations, and is now on track to completing his Master’s degree in economics and business administration from Istanbul University in Turkey.

== Career ==
Suliman began his career by establishing his own real estate company, Al Sheikh Real Estate, which worked in hotel construction and renovation.

In 2016, he entered the Arabian horse breeding industry and founded Al Sheikh Stud which won the World Arabian Horse Championship for two consecutive years in 2018 and 2019.

In 2022, he received a delegation from the Hilal Al-Quds Club in Jerusalem.
