= Samer Ismail =

Syrian actor (born 1985)

- Born: 8 July 1985 (age 40); Homs, Syria
- Occupation: Actor
- Known for: Omar (TV series)

Samer Ismail (Arabic: سامر إسماعيل; born 8 July 1985 in Homs, Syria) is a Syrian actor known for portraying the ancient character of Umar ibn al-Khattab, the second caliph of Islam in the pan-Arab television series Omar (TV series) directed by Hatem Ali. The series was produced and broadcast by MBC. Some questioned his portrayal of the character of Omar, demanding to know Ismail's religious origin. Ismail refused to reveal his religious denomination saying that this was a personal matter and was irrelevant to his role. He also played the role of Azzam in the TV series Minbar al Mawta directed by Rasha Sharbatji. He also appeared in the film Cello, directed by Darren Lynn Bousman.

== Filmography ==
Year	Title	Role	Notes
2012	Omar	Omar Bin Al-Khattab	TV series
2016	The Worthy	Musa	TV series
2023	The Cello		
