= Um Harun =

Television show

- ام هارون
- Genre: Serial drama; Political thriller
- Created by: Mḥammad Šams ʿAli Šams
- Directed by: Muhammad el-ʿAdel
- Starring: Ḥayāt il-Fahad; Haya ʿAbdissalām; Aḥmad il-Jasmi; Mḥammad Jabir; Fakhrīya Khamīs; Suʿād ʿAli; Abdilmiḥsin in-Nimir; Faṭma iṣ-Ṣaffi; Mḥammad il-ʿAlawi; Fuʾād ʿAli
- Country of origin: Kuwait (production)
- Original languages: Arabic (mainly Gulf Arabic, with a variety of other dialects); Hebrew (Mizrahi dialect)
- No. of seasons: 1
- No. of episodes: 30

Production
- Executive producer: Našʾat al-Mulḥim
- Producer: ʿimād il-ʿnizi
- Running time: 45 minutes
- Production company: Yes - Satellite Television

Original release
- Network: MBC1
- Release: April 24, 2020 – present

Um Hārūn (Note: also transcribed Um Haroun, Um Haroon, Umm Harun, and in other ways) (Gulf Arabic: ام هارون, romanized: Um Hārūn, lit. 'Mother of Aaron', Gulf Arabic pronunciation: [ʊm häːruːn]) is a Kuwaiti television series that started airing during Ramadan in 2020, a time when TV viewership in Arabic-speaking countries is very high. Most of the actors and actresses are from Arab states of the Persian Gulf, with the most notable being from Kuwait.

The series portrays the relations between the Muslim/Christian and Jewish communities in an unnamed Persian Gulf country, which according to the historical events of the show checks out to be Kuwait around 1948. It portrays the disruptions in social life suffered by the Jewish community at the peak of the Zionist movement and the 1948 Palestinian expulsion and flight.

Before it started airing, the show received mixed reactions, with many claiming that the show is an attempt to temper the desire to normalise relations between Arab states, most of whom do not have relations with Israel, at least in an official capacity, and Israel. Many of the actors and actresses including the lead actress, as well as the series' writer and the broadcasting network deny the assertion.

== Premise ==
The series begins with the Kuwaiti actress Haya ʿAbdissalām speaking Hebrew in a modern Mizrahi accent, telling the story of Um Harūn, an elderly Jewish obstetrician, that she wrote in a notebook titled אמו של אהרון (Mother of Aaron). It shows a multi-religious community living in harmony, with shops, houses, and places of worship next to each other. It shows Muslims congratulating their Jewish neighbors on weddings by saying mazal tov, as well as Muslims and Christians cooking Sabbath dinner together.

The lead actress and the writer said the series was influenced by the real story of the Bahraini Jewish lady Um Jān, from which the appearance and occupation were taken.

== Characters ==
=== Um Hārūn ===
Um Hārūn (Gulf Arabic: ام هارون, lit. 'Mother of Aaron', Gulf Arabic pronunciation: [ʊm häːruːn]; real name Samḥa Šāʾūl), is an elderly Jewish nurse who works at the city's hospital. She is played by the Kuwaiti actress Hayat Al-Fahad.

=== Rabbi David ===
Rabbi David (Gulf Arabic: حاخام داوود, romanized: Ḥākhām Dawūd) or Rabbi Dawūd is the city's Rabbi. He is very religious, and he also takes care of the city's synagogue in which he teaches Jewish children and leads the Sabbath. Rabbi David also takes care of the other needs of the local Jewish community, such as their financial needs. He is married to Masʿūda, and has two daughters: Rāḥīl (Rachel), and Rifqa (Rebecca), who is married to ʿIzra (Ezra), and all of them live under his roof. The Rabbi is a friendly person, often seen with his house- or shop- neighbours Mulla ʿAbdissalām and Bu Sʿīd, or chatting with Um Hārūn who had more than once reproached him for being too extreme about his religion, such as when he refused to marry his daughter Raḥīl who is deeply in love with her neighbour Mḥammad to him. Rabbi David is anti-Zionist, and had for many times warned his son-in-law of the dangers of such movement on the country and the Jewish people who live in it to no avail.

Rabbi David is played by Abdilmiḥsin in-Nimir, a Saudi actor from Al-Ahsa. He beseeched the help of a Bahraini Jewish MP in order to perfect his role, and he also practiced Hebrew using recordings to improve his language.

=== Mulla ʿAbdissalām ===
Mulla ʿAbdissalām (Gulf Arabic: ملا عبد السلام Gulf Arabic pronunciation: [mʊlːə ʿabdɪsːəläːm]) is the local mosque's imam. He is the father of Mḥammad. Despite holding some extreme views, he is often seen with Rabbi David, who is also his neighbour and whose shop in the sūg (market) is next to his, fighting over petty stuff, having a friendly conversation, or teaming up for a common task, such as advising Miriam in one episode, or scolding Father Samuel for distributing the Bible on Muslim and Jewish kids in another. He is also a close friend of Bu Sʿīd. Mulla ʿAbdissalām is played by the Kuwaiti actor Mḥammad Jābir.

=== Father Samuel ===
Father Samuel (Gulf Arabic: الاب صمويل, romanized: il-Ab Ṣamwēl) is the city's pastor.

=== Bu Sʿīd ===
Bu Sʿīd (Gulf Arabic: بو سعيد, lit. 'Father of Sʿīd', Gulf Arabic pronunciation: [bʊ sʕiːd]; real name unknown), is a big merchant and a close friend of Mulla ʿAbdissalām, whom he always advises against holding extreme religious and nationalistic views. He is married to Hind, and later on marries Miriam as well. He is the father of ʿAlya and the father-in-law of her husband Jabir, the four of whom live in his house. Bu Sʿīd is played by the Emirati actor Aḥmad il-Jasmi.

=== Miriam ===
Maryam (Miriam) is a Christian orphan who lived alone before marrying Bu Sʿīd. She was deeply in love with Jabir. Jabir, however, chooses money and power by marrying ʿAlya instead despite his love for her, so she gets back at him by marrying his father-in-law and moves on to live in the same house as he.

=== Ezra ===
ʿIzra (Ezra) (Gulf Arabic: عزرا Gulf Arabic pronunciation: [ʕɪzrə]) is Rabbi David's son-in-law who lives under his roof with his wife, Rifqa (Rebecca). A staunch believer in Zionism, he both helps other Zionists in the city immigrate to Israel and tries to convince non-Zionist Jews immigrate. Throughout the series, he grows more radical, stockpiling firearms in the city's synagogue, burning the house of Yaʿgūb (Jacob) in order to create a false sense of anti-Semitism and an urgency to immigrate, and stealing the Rabbi's safe with money and gold designated for the poor and needy of the Jewish people in order to help the movement. He has connections with other Zionist, such as British Zionists who reside in the British protectorate and deliver him news and support his activities.

=== Zannūba ===
Zēnab, more commonly known by her pet-name Zannūba, is a mentally-challenged young woman. She is very nosy, and she is the reason news spread around town fast.

== Response ==
The show stirred mixed reactions in Arabic-speaking countries, mostly as it was perceived as an attempt to soften Arabs' hard-held stance against establishing relations with Israel ("normalisation"). According to the New York Times's Ben Hubbard, the series portrays a time period that does not get as much attention. He adds that viewers of this show and "Makhraj 7", a concurrent TV show which portrayed supposedly-current Saudi attitudes towards Palestinians, as a mix of "entertainment with propaganda."

Less than four months after the first episode, in mid-August, United Arab Emirates and Bahrain signed the Abraham Accords normalization agreement with Israel brokered by the United States, with Sudan and Morocco following suit several months later. This move caused the TV series to be retrospectively accused by some Arab figures as "prelude to normalization".

=== Arab World ===
The lead actress Ḥayāt il-Fahad denied allegations of attempts at normalisation by making a distinction between the movement of Zionism, and Judaism whose "followers exist everywhere". When asked about the controversy, she said that the series does not deal with the "Zionist enemy" and their unacceptable acts, but is an illustration of a historical period, while expressing amazement at people who act as if there were no Jews in those countries during that time period. The series writer, ʿAli Šams, made similar statements in an interview.

Aḥmad Darawsha, a writer for the Arab-Israeli Arab48, replied to the controversy saying that the show is not about normalisation but about a part of the history of the Arab world, while warning against portraying a story contradictory to historical facts as pushed by Israel, which draws Israel as the saviour of the Arab Jews in countries rife with anti-semitism, hides the racism they faced after immigrating to Israel by European Jews, and omits the discriminatory state policies they had to face. He condoned the anti-normalisation stance Kuwait has taken and criticised the unsubstantiated calls for boycott over false premises, but showed support for people critical of the lead actress, Ḥayāt il-Fahad, who made racist comments against immigrant workers during the coronavirus pandemic. He also questioned the Egyptian director, Mḥammad el-ʿAdel, who directed previous series that were perceived as biased towards the view of the Egyptian government, as well as the support and funding of the show by the UAE, which he described as the leader of the "pro-normalisation propaganda campaign that it is leading in the region". The director was later criticised by many, including the lead actress, for attributing the success of the show to himself exclusively.

Saudi columnist Hussein Shobokshi praised the show for correcting biased views towards Jewish people, stating that "The Arabic television viewer, particularly the Khaleeji audience, is not used to seeing a strong Jewish character, unless they are in evil roles, whether it is from Islamic history or the present era," adding that "In Egyptian, Lebanese, Syrian or Iraqi films, which focused on the period before the 1940s, you can see Jewish characters living in Arab societies and portrayed favourably … when it comes to the Kuwait and Bahraini dramas [which cover that same period of time] there are no Jewish characters, despite their communities lived in that area for a long time."

The New York Times featured a quote by the prominent Palestinian journalist ʿAddilbāri ʿAțwān in which he says that 2020's Ramadan TV season won't be forgotten as it "witnessed the largest normalization campaign, driven by the Saudi media, with help from the government, and coordinated with the Israeli occupation state."

MBC, the network behind the show, stated that it is a drama series, not a documentary, and stated that it should not be linked to politics. ʿAbdilmiḥsin in-Nimir, the actor who played the rule of rabbi David, echoed similar sentiments, adding that the show paints [parts of] the Jewish community in a negative light.

According to Yediʿot Aḥronot, Syrian, Gazan, and Lebanese commentators criticised Saudi Arabia for its aspirations towards normalisation of relations with Israel for its own benefit at the cost of Palestinians' suffering, and linked the show to those years-long attempts. Saudis pushed back against the attacks by claiming they stem from jealousy towards their state in particular, and GCC states more generally, according to the same paper. The New York Times states that MBC is the largest private network in the Arab world, but despite that it is "ultimately controlled by the Saudi state."

The Emirati English-speaking The National says that the show was criticised for the perceived attempts at whitewashing "Israeli crimes against Palestinians and trying to rewrite history."

The New York Times, in its report, points to some attempts at establishing relations with Israel made by Saudi Arabia and the United Arab Emirates in order to counter the perceived threat of Iran and the Muslim Brotherhood. Michael Stephens, an expert in Gulf politics, believes that the show is encouraged and sponsored by the governments, according to the same paper.

The leader of the Houthis, Abdul-Malik al-Houthi, criticized the show for promoting normalization of ties with Israel.

=== Israel ===
Israel Defence Forces's Spokesperson Avichay Adraee defended the show and its lead actress, Ḥayāt il-Fahad, saying that she was facing accusations by conspiracy theorists who prefer xenophobic TV shows that promote anti-Semitic lies, and who look to the word "normalisation" as an insult.

Israeli journalist Edi Cohen demanded that Kuwait gives the Jewish community that was forced to unjustly emigrate their lands back and return their citizenships, in accordance with the Kuwaiti Constitution, which grants anyone who lived in Kuwait before 1920 citizenship.

Yediʿot Aḥronot, an Israeli newspaper, states that the airing of the series is important to open up the topic of forced emigration of Jews in Arab States in the 1950s and 1960s, adding that the Arab World is concerned about Israel utilising these events to undermine the right of return of Palestinians who were forced out of their cities in series of ethnic cleansings, a main demand of expelled Palestinians in the State of Palestine and in the diaspora.

== Criticism ==
The series was further criticised for numerous shortcomings in the Hebrew language, both spoken and written, as well as the numerous dialects from over the Arab World being spoken in a single neighbourhood.

Some anachronistic errors were also spotted, such as when Um Hārūn used disposable medical gloves that were not invented until 1965.

== Episodes ==
No.	Episode	Original release date
1	"The First Episode"	24 April 2020
The series starts presumably in Kuwait City in 1948, with Jews, Christians, and Muslims living side-by-side. The announcement of the creation of the state of Israel after the end of the British mandate over Palestine leads to a rift in the community and internal disputes within both the Jewish and the Muslim community, with the Jewish rabbi Dawūd (David) refusing any links with Zionism and warning the Jewish community against associating with such movement, to the dissatisfaction of ʿIzra (Ezra), who lives in the Rabbi's house, as the Muslim community alerts people against linking a political movement with the Jewish religion and community. Despite that, the episode ends with the murder of a Jewish man.
2	"The Second Episode"	25 April 2020
Manifestations of anti-semitism rise as radio stations broadcast the latest news on the progress of the occupation and the expulsion of Palestinians from their hometowns, amid demonstrations in defense of al-Aqsa mosque and the Palestinian people and further complications to the already-complicated romantic relationships between multiple Muslim and Jewish men and women.
3	"The Third Episode"	26 April 2020
As the conflict rages on, the fundamentalist voices in Kuwait City grow louder: a Zionist man (ʿIzra/Ezra) in the Jewish community grows agitated with Kuwaitis support for Palestine amidst dire warnings from Rabbi David against humoring such ideology as Zionism, in the same time that the strict Mulla ʿAbdissalām grows more frustrated with the whole Jewish community as his friend reminds him of the mistake of equating all Jews with Zionists.
4	"The Fourth Episode"	27 April 2020
Ezra and Rifqa (Rebecca), both Zionists who live under the roof of Rabbi David, deal with a Zionist foreigner (Šamʿūn/Simon) in the city (Kuwait was a British protectorate back then) for help in their efforts to keep in touch with the latest news about the movement. Simon gives them a Hebrew newspaper, which is later discovered by their neighbor, Mulla ʿAbdissalām, who had previously gotten into a quarrel with Ezra and Rabbi David over Ezra taking interest on a loan he had given, which is forbidden in Islam. ʿAbdissalām has a brief altercation with Rabbi David, who scolds the two once again. Unbeknowest to the Rabbi, Ezra and Rebecca start collecting money from the Zionists in the city in order to buy weapons.
5	"The Fifth Episode"	28 April 2020
Ezra and Rebecca start stockpiling weapons in the city's synagogue, as they start discussing plans to immigrate to Israel with other Zionists. The arms are discovered by Rabbi David, who is devastated and leaves the two in anger and disbelief. Meanwhile, Jews, Christians, and Muslims are seen attending an auction to collect donations for Palestine as news of massacres and expulsions continue. Mḥammad and Rachel run away in order to get married without their parents' approval.
6	"The Sixth Episode"	29 April 2020
The police reuturn the couple home, in the midst of their fathers disapproval. Rabbi David and Mulla ʿAbdissalām become mad at their wives for their 'failure' at bringing up their children properly. Noticing 'immodest' behaviour from Maryam (Miriam), Mulla ʿAbdissalām, Father Ṣamwēl (Samuel), and Rabbi David team up and visit her house at night to advise her. Utilising their husbands' absence, The three wives of Bu Sʿīd, Mulla ʿAbdissalām, and Rabbi David visit a 'sorcerer' to help them spice up their lives with their husbands, before being ratted out and taken to the police station.
7	"The Seventh Episode"	30 April 2020
As Father Samuel distributes copies of the Bible to Muslim and Jewish children, Rabbi David and Mulla ʿAbdissalām team up and go to the church to rebuke him. As she witnesses their involvement with the Zionist movement first-hand, Rachel is ashmamed of the acts of her sister Rebecca and her sister's husband Ezra, saying they are being ungrateful to the country they live and grew up in. Ezra is seen at the end of the episode meeting and speaking with British Zionists in English.
8	"The Eighth Episode"	1 May 2020
News of Zionist spies in Arab countries emerge, as Rabbi David gives his son-in-law Ezra an earful. Rabbi David's household is shocked after seeing 'Death to Jews' written over their wall.
9	"The Ninth Episode"	2 May 2020
Police take Ezra to the police station for investigation.
10	"The Tenth Episode"	3 May 2020
After a short talk, the police let Ezra free with a warning. Rumours start in the city of Ezra being a Zionist. Meanwhile, Ezra, his wife, and other Zionists burn the house of Yaʿqūb (Jacob), a Jewish man, in order to create a false illusion of anti-semitism after growing frustrated with Rabbi David and the Jewish community's unrelenting opposition to Zionism.
11	"The Eleventh Episode"	4 May 2020
12	"The Twelfth Episode"	5 May 2020
Ezra expresses surprise to his British Zionist friend over the Jewish community's refusal to immigrate to Yərūšālayim (Jerusalem) after all the events, to which his friend replies that the Jewish people have become accustomed to each culture and civilisation they reside in, and advised Ezra to continue what he and his gang have been doing, promising support.
13	"The Thirteenth Episode"	6 May 2020
The money and gold stored in Rabbi David's house to help the poor, orphan, and needy Jews is stolen by his son-in-law Ezra in order to help fund their movement, as his wife, the Rabbi's daughter, asks God for forgiveness and the Rabbi goes to the police in order to find the culprit.

== See also ==
- Al-Taghreba al-Falastenya
