= Being Osama =

- Five Montreal men who happened to have the name "Osama"
- Directed by: Mahmoud Kaabour; Tim Schwab
- Written by: Mahmoud Kaabour
- Produced by: Diversus [ca]
- Starring: Osama (Sam) Shalabi; Ossama al-Sarraf; Ossama el-Naggar; Osama el-Demerdash; Oussama al-Jundi; Osama Dorias
- Music by: Osama (Sam) Shalabi
- Release date: November 2004
- Country: Canada
- Language: English

Being Osama is a 2004 documentary about how the lives of men named "Osama" changed in the aftermath of the September 11 attacks.

It was produced by Tim Schwab and Mahmoud Kaabour. Director Kaabour is the founder and managing director of Veritas Films, now based in the United Arab Emirates. Co-director Schwab is an associate professor of film at Montreal's Concordia University.

== Synopsis ==
The documentary details the lives of six Montreal Arab men, all with the first name "Osama":

- Osama (Sam) Shalabi, of Egyptian origin, a music composer who grew up in Atlantic Canada. He is a leading member of the Montreal-based instrumental band, Shalabi Effect. He composed the soundtrack for Being Osama.
- Ossama al-Sarraf (better known as Sultan), a Palestinian Christian (specifically Gazan) Canadian DJ who wears dreadlocks. He is one half of the DJ duo, Sultan & Shepard.
- Ossama el-Naggar, an Egyptian Canadian musical expert and importer of opera and classical music CDs living in Canada for over twenty years
- Osama el-Demerdash, an Egyptian, who is very politically active regarding issues surrounding immigrant rights and deportation of refugees
- Oussama al-Jundi, a Lebanese Canadian who runs a Muslim school in Montreal
- Osama Dorias, an Iraqi Canadian and devout Muslim whose family fled Saddam Hussein's regime while he was still a young child. His father has recently returned to Iraq and portrayed as a university graduate and a basketball player, involved in organizing a Muslim basketball league in a Montreal suburb.

They all recount their experiences in the wake of the terrorist attacks of September 11, 2001.

== Reception and distribution ==
The film has been recognised as a contribution to the intellectual and artistic debate about the Arab diaspora.

Kaabour presented it in a two-hour special on the Zaven Kouyoumdjian pan Arab talk show "Seereh w Enfatahit" (Arabic سيرة وانفتحت) on the Lebanese Future Television channel.

== Awards ==
Being Osama has won international awards including:

- Best Documentary at the University Film and Video Conference
- Best Documentary award at the Big Muddy Film Festival at Southern Illinois University
- An Aurora Award (for Best Documentary) at the Canadian National Youth Film Festival
- Certificate of Merit for fighting racism from the Canadian Race Relations Foundation.

== See also ==
- List of cultural references to the September 11 attacks
- Where in the World Is Osama Bin Laden?
