= Every Last Child =

- Directed by: Tom Roberts
- Written by: Tom Roberts
- Produced by: Anna Melin; Tom Roberts; Sabin Agha
- Cinematography: Ali Faisal Zaidi
- Music by: Nitin Sawhney
- Distributed by: Zeitgeist Films (USA)
- Release date: 14 November 2014 (DocNYC)
- Running time: 83 minutes
- Countries: Pakistan; United Arab Emirates
- Languages: Urdu; English; Pashto

Every Last Child (2014) is a Pakistani and UAE documentary film directed and produced by Tom Roberts and made under the Imagenation Abu Dhabi FZ banner. Roberts also wrote the story of the film. The film was released in three different languages—Urdu, English and Pashto.

== Plot ==
Every Last Child shows the steps taken in Pakistan to eliminate poliomyelitis (polio) infection from the country. Polio, which had almost been eradicated from the world, showed resurgence in Pakistan after the Taliban banned polio vaccinations. The film also shows the efforts made by health care workers, who, in spite of difficulties while doing their work such as violence and politics, attempted to save Pakistani children from polio.

The first scene in Every Last Child is of a fully armed army unit being told by its captain to get ready for war, but in this case the war is to give protection against the Taliban who are obstructing the polio vaccinators from immunizing children. Polio victims are then profiled: In one scene, a destitute person affected by polio and pushing a dilapidated cart says "I'll be fit in the afterlife"; in another scene, a polio-affected child is getting fitted with braces, with his distressed father watching; in yet another scene a lady whose two family members were killed by the Taliban when they were canvassing for vaccination is actively supporting the cause of vaccination. There are also scenes of false propaganda made against the vaccinations stating perceived ill effects of the polio vaccine such as making "girls prematurely adult and boys impotent." The propaganda also attributes the vaccine as a plot of Jews and Christians with intent to eliminate Muslims.

The film ends on a positive note, with a scene showing documents related to the success of the vaccination programme under the title "Justice for Health", a programme initiated by Imran Khan.

== Production ==
Every Last Child is a production by Image Nation Abu Dhabi FZ, directed by Tom Roberts who was also the script writer. Roberts was also the producer of the film, along with Anna Melin and Sabin Agha. Ali Faisal Zaidi was the Director of Photography and editing and composing was done by Paul Carlin. The film's run time is 82 minutes.

== Release and reception ==
Every Last Child was released in November 2014 and received mostly positive reviews from critics. America's National Public Radio called it an "unboring" documentary. The New York Times said "Tom Roberts's observational film conveys an uncommon sense of the urgency befitting the stakes raised by the public health crisis." The Hollywood Reporter found the film "all too timely in the wake of the recent Ebola crisis." The film has a score of 73% on Metacritic.
