= City of Life =

- Official poster for the film
- Directed by: Ali F. Mostafa
- Screenplay by: Gerry Sherard; Ali F. Mostafa
- Story by: Ali F. Mostafa
- Produced by: Leigh Clarke; Ali F. Mostafa; Tim Smythe; Tanya Wagner
- Starring: Alexandra Maria Lara; Sonu Sood; Saoud Al Kaabi; Narcy; Jason Flemyng; Natalie Dormer
- Cinematography: Michael Brierley
- Edited by: Raul Skopecz
- Music by: Matthew Faddy; Barry Kirsch
- Distributed by: Gate Media Films; Filmworks Dubai; AFM Films
- Release date: 11 December 2009 (Dubai)
- Country: United Arab Emirates
- Languages: Arabic; English; Hindi

City of Life is a 2009 multilingual Emirati film written, directed, and produced by Ali F. Mostafa. Set in the United Arab Emirates, the film revolves around three parallel lives, amongst many cultures in one city, namely, Dubai.

== Production ==
=== Background ===
According to the director Ali F. Mostafa, the inspiration for producing City of Life came from his frustration with people comparing Dubai to a Disneyland. According to the director, "Most of them take one look at the glitzy buildings and assume it's an artificial place. My film has none of that. It has real people with real problems. Like any other city in the world, my film shows both the positives and the negatives."

== Reception ==
=== Box office ===
According to data produced by Italia Film International the movie ranked second in the local box office and successfully made over 500,000 dirhams in its first weekend.

== Cast ==
- Alexandra Maria Lara as Natalia Moldovan
- Sonu Sood as Basu/Peter Patel
- Saoud Al Kaabi as Faisal
- Narcy as Khalfan
- Susan George as Constance Bateman
- Jason Flemyng as Guy Berger
- Natalie Dormer as Olga
- Ahmed Ahmed as Nasser
- Habib Ghuloom as Faisal's Father
- Jaaved Jaffrey as Suresh Khan
- David Chant as Senior Flight Officer
- Kubbra Sait as Bollywood Fantasy Starlet
