= Neven Madi =

Emirati-Syrian actress (born 1992)

- Born: Neven Madi; November 25, 1992 (age 33); Abu Dhabi, United Arab Emirates
- Occupation: Actress
- Years active: 1999–present

Neven Madi (born 25 November 1992) is an Emirati-Syrian actress. She is best known for her work in television series broadcast in the Persian Gulf region, as well as in some Syrian works. Her most famous roles were in Sea Shadow in 2011, Eyes ink in 2012, Love is bossy in 2014, Justice: Qalb Al Adala in 2017, and The Inheritance in 2020. She is the cousin of Syrian actress Jumana Murad.

== Career ==
Madi began acting as a child in the United Arab Emirates. She started on the Emirati stage at about the age of eight before moving into Gulf television dramas, including Meteb al-Qalb, Tamasha, Ma Netefeq and Hawameer al-Sahraa. Her early theatre work included a child role in Amal Al-Suwaidi's play Ghabbat al-Waswas, followed by stage appearances in productions such as Bab al-Amal and Kingdom of Monkeys.

One of Madi's early film roles was the title character in Saeed Salmeen's short film Bint Mariam. The film was a 26-minute drama about a girl pressured into marriage and listed Madi in the title role. Bint Mariam won the audience award at the Souss International Film Forum in Morocco and that Madi won the festival's best actress award.

Madi starred as Kaltham in Nawaf Al Janahi's feature film Sea Shadow. The coming-of-age film was set in Ras Al Khaimah and centred on Mansoor, played by Omar Al Mulla, and Kaltham, played by Madi.

In 2014, Madi appeared in Saeed Salmeen's feature film Sun Dress. The National reported that the film was released in cinemas in the United Arab Emirates and identified Madi as one of its stars, noting her previous role in Sea Shadow.

Madi also worked in Gulf television. In 2012, Al Khaleej reported that she was cast as Habiba in the series Hibr al-Oyoun. She later appeared as Leila in Justice: Qalb Al Adala, an Emirati legal drama. Reviewing the series after its release on Netflix, Arab News described Leila as the younger sister of Farah, the central lawyer character.

== Works ==
=== Series ===
Series
Year	Name	Role
1999	Hayer Tayer	
2008	Noss Darzen	
2008	The Midwife	Young Baderiya
2008	Miss Nora	
2009	The Desert Hummers	
2010	Daughters of Shama	
2010	North wind	
2010	Heart tiring	
2010–2017	Tamasha	
2011	We dont agree	
2012	04	
2012	Girls 4	
2012	Eyes ink	Habiba
2012	Love papers	Alonnoud
2013	Silence of revelation	Reem
2013	Omran tales	
2013	Lol time	
2014	Obsessions	
2014	Grain of sand	
2014	Love is Bossy	
2015	Fetnat zamanha	
2015	Dubai London Dubai	
2017	Justice: Qalb Al Adala	Layla
2018	White hearts	Shams
2018	House of Zeen	
2019	Just moments	
2019	Alassouf	Batoul
2019	AlTawash	Mozah
2019	Mansour S5	
2020	Lick number is 7	Layla
2020	Soughan daughter	Ghazeel
2020	The inheritance	Ohoud

=== Films ===
Films
Year	Name	Role
2008	Daughter of Mariam	
2011	Sea Shadow	Kaltham
2014	Sun dress	
2014	Jomaa and The sea	
2017	Match	
2018	Awar Qalb	Neven
2019	Ali and Alya	Alya

=== Stages ===
Stages
Year	Name
2006	Kingdom of monkeys
2009	Abood and Dodo
2011	Me, my wife and Obama
2016	Wedding of Monday
