= The Cello (2023 film) =

Film by Darren Lynn Bousman

- Theatrical release poster
- Directed by: Darren Lynn Bousman
- Written by: Turki Al-Sheikh
- Based on: Cello by Turki Al Alshikh
- Produced by: Lee Nelson
- Starring: Jeremy Irons; Samer Ismail; Elham Ali; Souad Abdullah; Tobin Bell; Muhannad Al Hamdi
- Cinematography: Maxime Alexandre
- Edited by: Harvey Rosenstock; Zeborah Tidwell
- Music by: Joseph Bishara
- Production companies: Alamiya; Envision Media Arts
- Distributed by: Rozam Media
- Release dates: September 8, 2023 (The Boulevard); September 14, 2023 (United Arab Emirates)
- Country: Saudi Arabia
- Languages: Arabic; English
- Box office: $5,314

The Cello is a 2023 Saudi Arabian horror film directed by Darren Lynn Bousman and written by Turki Al-Sheikh. It is based on Al-Sheikh's novel of the same title and stars Jeremy Irons, Samer Ismail, Elham Ali, Souad Abdullah, Tobin Bell and Muhannad Al Hamdi. The story revolves around an aspiring cellist who acquires an insidious cello that begins to wreak havoc around him.

Production for The Cello took place in late 2021. It premiered in Boulevard Riyadh City on September 8, 2023, and was released in the United Arab Emirates on September 14, 2023.

== Cast ==
- Jeremy Irons as Francesco
- Tobin Bell as Vincent
- Samer Ismail as Nasser
- Elham Ali as Alia
- Mila Al Zahrani as Sarah
- Souad Abdullah as Haya Latif
- Muhannad Al Hamdi as Omar
- Baraa Alem as Hamza
- Ghassan Massoud as Saleh Latif
- Chloé Henry as Maria

== Production ==
The Cello is based on Turki Al-Sheikh's novel of the same name, who also wrote the script. Darren Lynn Bousman was hired to direct with Lee Nelson producing. Principal photography completed in October 2021 after more than 100 days of filming in Saudi Arabia, Egypt, Vienna, Prague, and Iceland.

In February 2023, as the film entered post-production, Bousman told horror news website Bloody Disgusting, "This movie has been a beast. We finally finished it a few weeks back and are currently in the middle of a deal for its release. So, hopefully, an announcement soon! Since the movie was shot primarily in Arabic, mixing it, doing the ADR, and then having to translate it has taken longer than we were expecting. Our hope is the movie will be released later this year".

== Release ==
The Cello had its world premiere in Boulevard Riyadh City on September 8, 2023. It was released in the United Arab Emirates on September 14, 2023, where it grossed $5,314. The film was released onto 288 theater screens in the United States by Destiny Media Entertainment on December 8, 2023.
