= Teta, Alf Marra =

- Directed by: Mahmoud Kaabour
- Written by: Mahmoud Kaabour
- Produced by: Veritas Films
- Cinematography: Muriel Aboulrouss
- Edited by: Patricia Heneine
- Music by: Nabil Amarshi
- Distributed by: Taskovski Films
- Release date: October 2010
- Running time: 50 minutes
- Countries: United Arab Emirates; Qatar; Lebanon
- Languages: Arabic language, English

Teta, Alf Marra (Arabic for: Grandma, A Thousand Times) is a 2010 Arabic-language documentary film about the life of a grandmother living in Beiruti.

The film has a runtime of 48 minutes and was co-produced by the United Arab Emirates, Qatar, and Lebanon. It was financially supported by the Doha Film Institute and Screen Institute Beirut, and produced by Veritas Films. It was also the first film released by a company based in Twofour54, a media content creation free zone in Abu Dhabi.

“Teta, Alf Marra” is recognized as the first locally produced documentary to be shown in cinemas in the UAE and to secure regional distribution. It was also the first documentary produced in the Gulf Cooperation Council (GCC) to qualify for the Academy Awards, following theatrical screening in Los Angeles and New York City.

== Synopsis ==
The film is a documentary about 83-year-old Beiruti grandmother, Teta Fatima, focusing on her life and surroundings amid a changing world.

== Director ==
Teta, Alf Marra was directed by Mahmoud Kaabour, a filmmaker who has received several awards for his work.

== Awards ==
- Audience Award for Best Documentary at the Doha Tribeca Film Festival (2010), Qatar
- Special Jury Mention for Mahmoud Kaabour at the Doha Tribeca Film Festival (2010), Qatar
- Best International Documentary Award at DOX BOX (2011), Syria
- Best Film Award at the London International Documentary Festival (2011), UK
- Special Jury Mention at DocsDF Festival (2011), Mexico

== Festival attendances ==
- October 2010: World Premiere at the Doha Tribeca Film Festival, Qatar
- October 2010: African Premiere at Carthage Film Festival, Tunisia
- December 2010: Teta, Alf Marra screened at the grand opening of Mathaf: Arab Museum of Modern Arts, Qatar
- January 2011: UAE Premiere in Abu Dhabi at the National Theatre
- January 2011: European Premiere at International Film Festival Rotterdam, The Netherlands
- March 2011: Dox Box International Documentary Film Festival Damascus, Syria
- April 2011: American Premiere at Tribeca Film Festival New York, USA with a special screening and panel in the “TriBeCa Talks: After the Movie” series
- May 2011: UK Premiere at London International Documentary Film Fest, UK
- May 2011: Polish Premiere at Krakow Film Festival
- May 2011: Festival Cinéma Arabe Amsterdam, the Netherlands
- June 2011: Seattle International Film Festival, USA
- June 2011: Screening at Royal Film Commission, Amman, Jordan
- June 2011: Arab Film Week at INCAA, Buenos Aires, Argentina
- July 2011: Arab Film Festival, Sydney, Australia
- July 2011: Indianapolis International Film Festival, USA
- August 2011: Santiago International Film Festival, Chile
- August 2011: Montreal World Film Festival, Montreal, Canada
- September 2011: Screening at Fondation Liban Cinema, Lebanon
- October 2011: Vancouver International Film Festival, Canada
- October 2011: DocsDF Festival, Mexico City, Mexico
- October 2011: Arab Film Festival, San Francisco, Berkeley, San Jose, Los Angeles, USA
- October 2011: St. John's International Women's Film Festival, Canada
- October 2011: Calgary Arab Film Festival, Canada
- October 2011: Iihlava International Documentary Film Festival, Czech Republic
- October 2011: Thessaloniki Biennale of Contemporary Art, Greece
- November 2011: Special Screening Tribeca Cinemas NYC, USA
- January 2012: Tromsø International Film Festival, Norway
- January 2012: Helsinki Documentary Film Festival, Finland
- February 2012: Middle Eastern Film Festival Edinburgh, UK
- February 2012: International Film Festival Port- land Oregon, USA
- March 2012: Special Screening LAU Alumni Film Festival Beirut, Lebanon
- April and May 2012: Documentary Edge Festival, New Zealand
- May 2012: Jacob Burns Film Center New York, USA
- June 2012: Shorts Shorts Film Festival & Asia in Japan Tokyo, Japan
- Septembre 2012: Special Screening, Semaine du Liban in Paris, Embassy of Lebanon. France
- October 2012: Taiwan International Documentary Festival, Taiwan
- October 2012: London MINA Film Festival, UK
- October 2012: Bjelovar Film Festival, Croatia
