= The Worthy =

- Theatrical release poster
- Directed by: Ali F. Mostafa
- Written by: Vikram Weet
- Produced by: Peter Safran; Steven Schneider; Rami Yasin
- Starring: Mahmoud Al Atrash; Rakeen Saad; Samer Ismail; Maisa Abd Elhadi; Samer al-Masry
- Edited by: Shahnaz Al-Dulaimy
- Music by: Joseph Bishara
- Production companies: Image Nation; Room 101, Inc. IM Global; The Safran Company
- Release dates: 8 October 2016 (London Film Festival); 23 February 2017
- Running time: 99 minutes
- Country: United Arab Emirates
- Language: Arabic

The Worthy (Arabic: المختارون, alMukhtarun) is a 2016 Arabic thriller film directed by Ali F. Mostafa, and produced by Image Nation. The movie was released on 23 February 2017 in the Middle East.

== Plot ==
The Worthy is a narrative film that describes what will happen in a post-apocalyptic future where political conflicts go out of hand. The story begins with a truck driver that goes by the name of Shoaib (also known as Abu Eissa) picking up a stranger. The stranger warns him of what danger is to come due to these conflicts taking frightening twists. Shoaib listens to the man's advice and takes his two children Eissa and Maryam to seek shelter. One of the political parties decides to make matters worse by contaminating the water supply. Most of the population dies out of fear and hunger in the upcoming years; however Shoaib and his family along with seven others find shelter with clean water in an abandoned airplane factory.

One night, Shoaib, Eissa, his righthand man Qais and Daoud encounter bandits who hold a vulnerable woman as bait; Shoaib falls victim to this but two other survivors passing by, Mussa and Gulbin, save him. Shoaib invites them in for food and shelter as guests and debates with the others whether to keep them permanently. Eissa insists they keep them as they saved his father's life, while the others say they cannot be trusted. Maryam states she doesn't trust Mussa, as Gulbin−who does not speak the common tongue−is scared of him. Jamaal, another survivor in the factory, mentions that Mussa still has a knife on him. The group has a rule, that weapons must be locked in a cabinet. When Shoaib asks for the knife, Mussa kills him, shouts that the earth is only for the worthy, and leaves.

Mussa starts killing off the survivors, first by turning off the water supply and booby-trapping its valve. Raed, a former teacher, dies and Daoud is injured. Jamaal distrusts Gulbin and falls out with Eissa who takes a liking towards Gulbin. Eissa, who is now leader, expels him.

Later, Eissa, Qais, and Reya (Raed's wife) go in search of water. They discover Jamaal tied and mutilated. This turns out to be another trap, which leads to Reya's death. Eissa and Qais return to the factory to find Gulbin, who was on watch, bleeding. Qais stays with her, while Eissa goes to help the others. He finds them dead except his sister, Maryam. She has a noose around her neck and is standing on a plane wing with Mussa on the other side. So he has a choice either kill Mussa and risk losing Maryam or save her and be killed. Maryam sacrifices herself and Mussa is killed. Eissa goes back to Qais and Gulbin to find him dead and Gulbin standing there; she speaks the common tongue and was the mastermind. She explains this was a test to find people to join their group (alif-yaa) who are going to build civilization back up and tells him to meet them in Medina before knocking him unconscious. Now he is alone, wandering in search of food.

He comes across the man whom his father had encountered, the Seer, who explains that the group was formed to rebuild civilization, but the catastrophe lowered people's standards and they accepted crazed people who liked the chaos. That is why he left and Shoaib helped him leave. Eissa leaves in the morning with weapons, heading towards Medina.

== Cast ==
- Mahmoud Al Atrash as Eissa
- Rakeen Saad as Maryam
- Samer Ismail as Musa
- Maisa Abd Elhadi as Gulbin
- Samer al-Masry as Shuaib
- Ali Suliman as Jamal
- Habib Ghuloom Al Attar as Adam
- Ruba Blal as Raya
- Salah Hannoun as Qais
- Mohammad Al Ibrahimi as Raed
- Rashed Malhas as Idrees
- Mohammed Mostafa as Daoud
- Manal Shomaly as Hareem

== Reception ==
=== Box office ===
The movie was released in theaters on 23 February 2017, but the world premiere was held at Vue Cinemas in Leicester Square in London, UK. The screening was full in London, and it gave high hopes to the producers. It is today also available on Netflix in the Arabic movies section. It was a very low budget movie, and Image Nation, the production company, always struggled to attract people to its movies internationally, but The Worthy seemed to be the one that changed this tendency with a mitigated reception of it. The budget and the revenue are unknown, as well as the number of entries.

=== Nominations ===
Ali F. Mostafa, the director of the movie, has been nominated in two categories during the 2016 edition of the Dubai International Film Festival for Best Emirati Director Award and Best Muhr Emirati Feature. Although he did not win these awards, the nominations themselves were great steps for his career.

=== Critics ===
The Worthy has been a largely viewed movie, first because of its extensive media coverage, but also because the synopsis was a one of a kind for the region. The local newspaper The National gave it a 3.5 out of 5, saying : “The film rattles along nicely towards its inventive final stand-off, which once again makes the most of the relatively limited resources through ingenious use of some chains, an aeroplane wing and basic physics.” And AlloCiné, a French website where members rate movies and leave comments, gave it an overall rating of 2.5 out of 5. One of the website users said “No superhero, no impressive combat scenes (even though some are violent), here it is real, with the struggle of a chief thorn between the survival of his own people and the appearance of two strangers asking for protection in this crazy world; it‘s a good post-apocalyptic movie” while another one said “It is full of very dramatic and amateur performances, with a lot of moments that doesn’t make sense and too far from reality.”
