= Samer al-Masry =

Syrian actor

Samer al-Masry سامر المصري
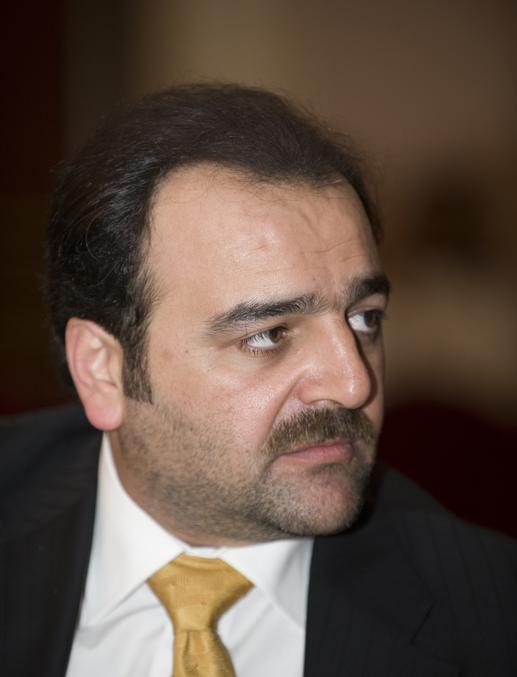
- Born: Samer Al Masri; 3 August 1969 (age 57); Damascus, Syria
- Occupation: Actor
- Years active: 2006–present
- Spouse: Nivine Azzam

Samer al-Masry, also spelled Samer al-Masri, (Arabic: سامر المصري; born 3 August 1969) is a Syrian actor. He is best known for his lead role in the Syrian drama Bab al-Hara. Following the victory of the Syrian revolution, al-Masry appeared in a self-recorded video where he celebrated the victory with tears, emotionally describing how he was coming to see his mom who he had not seen for 14 years due to the exile imposed by the Assad regime after he received numerous threats for voicing opposition to the now ousted regime. On January 26, 2025, Al-Masry arrived in Damascus airport where he was welcomed by supporters and went and visited his mom for the first time in 14 years.

== Career ==
Al-Masry has performed in theater and film but is best known for his work in television and his lead role in Bab al-Hara. He has also starred in Orkedia, Jalsat Nisaa'ya, Al Dabour, 'Wajh El Adalah', Abu Janti, and Beit Jidi.

Al-Masry also starred in the Palestinian TV series Yehya Ayash. After Abu Janti 2 in 2012, Samer Al Masri moved to Dubai, in the United Arab Emirates. In 2014, Samer Al-Masry took part in the new movie From A to B alongside Egyptian actor Khaled Abol Naga and Yosra El Lozy. In 2016, Al-Masry starred in the movie 'The Worthy' and The Cell in 2017 along with Egyptian actors Ahmed Ezz and Amina Khalil.

== Filmography ==
=== Film ===
Year	Title	Role	Notes
2009	Dabbour	Khattab	
2014	From A to B	Syrian Rebel Leader	
2016	The Worthy	Shuaib	
2017	The Cell	Marwan	
2021	The Misfits	Hassan	
2021	Imam Al-Muhaddithin Al-Bukhary	Al Bukhary	
2022	North of the 10	Farouq Al Demerdash	

=== Television ===
Year	Title	Role	Notes
2006–2008	Bab Al-Hara	Hisham Abu Shehab	110 episodes
2010	Abu Janti	Abu Janti	30 episodes
2025	Muawiya	Umar	30 episodes
