= Going to Heaven =

- Directed by: Saeed Salmeen Al-Murry
- Written by: Saeed Salmeen Al-Murry
- Produced by: Amer Salmeen Al-Murry
- Starring: Jumaa Al Zaabi, Ahmed Al Zaabi, Fatima Alaei, Mariam Sultan, Abdullah Masood, Abdulla Al Junaibi
- Cinematography: Newine Behi
- Edited by: Almahdi Jannah
- Music by: Khaldoon Ismail
- Release date: 12 August 2015
- Running time: 90 minutes
- Country: United Arab Emirates
- Language: Arabic
- Budget: $300,000

Going to Heaven (Arabic: ساير الجنة; Sayer Al-Janna) is a 2015 Emirati drama film directed by Saeed Salmeen Al-Murry, Produced by Amer Salmeen and starring Jumaa Ibrahim Al Zaabi, Ahmed Ibrahim Al Zaabi, Fatima Al Taei, Mariam Sultan and Abdullah Masood. Its plot is set in the United Arab Emirates. The story is about a young 11 year old boy called Sultan who travels from Abu Dhabi to Fujairah with his best friend, Saud, to reunite with his maternal, far gone grandmother, who is estranged from the family.

== Plot ==
Going To Heaven is a family film that took place in the United Arab Emirates, starting from Abu Dhabi. In Abu Dhabi, Sultan (Jumaa Al Zaabi) who has lost his mother at a very young age and feels lost in this world. his father remarries and moves the family to Abu Dhabi where he is forced to live with his callous stepmother and younger sister, Fatima. Sultan craves innocent love but all his stepmother is offering him unkind constraints and careless actions, He finds his calmness and serenity through his three pet goldfish who his stepmother is set out to get rid of. However, Sultan yearns for something much important and much bigger than this. Sultan yearns for the warmth, love, and care of his maternal grandmother who has estranged from the family years ago. When Sultan's young sister, Fatima, shared the news that their father is hiding a photograph and a tape record of their grandmother, Sultan makes his final decision to search for his grandmother once and for all. From Abu Dhabi to Fujairah, the young Sultan sets off on an adventurous journey as he seeks out his grandmother. However, he is accompanied by one of his closest and older friend, Saud (Ahmed Al Zaabi). Saud loves motorcycles and football stars and plays a big role as the 'big boss' and 'the planner', investigator and helper in all problems of his friend. Confiding in his friend Saud, they plot their adventurous journey to a remote part of Fujairah where they believe that Sultan's grandmother lives in. With hundreds of kilometers between Abu Dhabi and Fujairah. This trip unravels surprises and exuberant emotions. This journey is no easy journey for two young boys, yet they hatch a plan to run away from their school trip to Dubai and head off straight to Fujairah. Also, through this journey across the Emirates, Sultan find the missing pieces to his puzzle, encountering fundamental life lessons along his way on this journey. One of the important lessons taught throughout this movie is the importance of family in the Emirati culture, the film also highlights the challenges that we humans face in the community by representing the lack of traditional communications between family members and the technology control that controls our lives. This issue is not the only issue that affects the United Arab Emirates community, but the world in general.

== Cast ==
The entire cast were Emirati citizens, as Murry takes pride in creating films that represent Arab identity and culture, which he believes is very important.

- Jumaa Al Zaabi as Sultan
- Ahmed Al Zaabi as Saud
- Fatima Altaei
- Mariam Sultan
- Abdullah Masoud
- Abdullah Al Junaibi

== Production ==
This film was shot in November 2015 in the United Arab Emirates and is 90 minutes long. This film was produced with the support of Arab Cinema campaign, which aims to increase awareness of Arab films, as well as encourage both local and expat audience to watch these Arab produced films. This film also had help from Cine Vision Art Production that form, develop and produce quality films associated with Image Nation Abu Dhabi. Majid Al Futtain Cinemas - VOX Cinemas were also pleased to promote Emirati films, as they believe that both local and expat families across the nation will appreciate the sentimental story. The filming had a budget of US $300,000. The crew included:

- Director : Saeed Salmeen Al-Murry
- Producer : Amer Salmeen Al-Murry
- Scriptwriter : Saeed Salmeen Al-Murry
- Editor : Haider Rashid
- Cast : Jumaa Al Zaabi, Ahmed Al Zaabi, Fatima Altaei, Mariam Sultan, Abdullah Masoud, Abdullah Al Junaibi
- Music: Khaldoon Ismail
- Cinematography: Newine Behi
- Assistant Director: Ammar Al Kooheji, Jawad Sophia
- Sound Department: Gabriele Fasano
- Camera & Electrical Department: Michel Bouquerel, Nicolas Cagniard, Charles Cornier
- Other: Ivan Khadir

== Marketing ==
Going to Heaven premiered at the Dubai International Film Festival, where it won the award for Best Muhr Emirati Feature. The film's marketing took place on different social media websites such as blogs, news channels such as Gulf News, Facebook, Twitter, Dubai International Film Festival's 'Going to Heaven' page, Image Nation Abu Dhabi's page on Going to Heaven, and magazines. As an Emirati production, the film received promotional backing and distribution support from regional organizations.

== Accolades ==
Dubai International Film Festival 2015 - the Muhr Emirati Award for best feature film
