= Until Midnight =

2018 film directed by Tariq AlKazim

- Theatrical release poster
- Directed by: Tariq Al Kazim
- Written by: Tariq Al Kazim
- Produced by: Yunjie Han
- Starring: Ahmed Khamis Ali; Chuka Ekweogwu; Hiba Hamoui
- Production company: The Madwriters
- Distributed by: Vox
- Release date: 21 June 2018
- Running time: 78 minutes
- Country: United Arab Emirates
- Languages: Arabic, English

Until Midnight (Arabic: حتى منتصف الليل, romanized: Ha'ta mountas'saf al-layl) is an Emirati thriller film. It is directed by Tariq Alkazim and produced by Yunjie Han. Ahmed Khamis Ali plays the lead role of Salem. The film was released in June 2018.

== Plot ==
Newly married Salem finds a stranger in his home who has malevolent plans.

== Cast ==
- Ahmed Khamis Ali as Salem
- Chuka Ekweogwu as Ronin
- Hiba Hamoui as Sarah
- Rik Aby as Hassan
- Marwan Ahmed as Abdulqader

== Production ==
The film is shot in Dubai in a villa at Al Barsha - Dubai, U.A.E

== Bibliography ==
- https://gulfnews.com/leisure/movies/features/emirati-horror-flick-brings-an-intruder-home-1.2238124
- https://www.akhbaralaan.net/entertainment/celebrities/2018/6/4/%D8%AD%D8%AA%D9%89-%D9%85%D9%86%D8%AA%D8%B5%D9%81-%D8%A7%D9%84%D9%84%D9%8A%D9%84-%D9%81%D9%8A%D9%84%D9%85-%D8%B1%D8%B9%D8%A8-%D9%85%D9%86-%D8%A7%D9%84%D8%A5%D9%85%D8%A7%D8%B1%D8%A7%D8%AA
- http://www.adwonline.ae/uae-verge-film-revolution/
