= Tariq AlKazim =

Emirati filmmaker

- Born: Dubai, United Arab Emirates
- Education: New York Film Academy
- Occupations: Writer, Director
- Years active: 2012
- Known for: A Tale of Shadows
- Awards: Arabian Business Future Star

Tariq AlKazim is an Emirati filmmaker. He had won the Arabian Business Future Star award in 2018. He is best known for his 2017 movie A Tale of Shadows and the short film, "The Man Who Met The Angel", which premiered in the Dubai International Film Festival, Also "Death Circle" and "Quiet" Which both premiered in the gulf film festival.

== Filmography ==
Year	Film	Role	Cast	Notes
2020	A Tale of Shadows: Illusions	Director and Writer	Chuka Ekweogwu, Robert Cristian Trif, Arzu Neuwirth, Almer Agmyren	Feature Film (Pre Production)
2018	Until Midnight	Director and Writer	Ahmed Khamis Ali, Chuka Ekweogwu, Hiba Hamoui	Feature Film
2017	A Tale of Shadows	Director and Writer	Chuka Ekweogwu, Rik Aby, Arzu Neuwirth, Almer Agmyren, Dijana Divjak	Feature Film
2016	The Wizard and The Girl	Director and Writer	Hala Bassar, Chuka Ekweogwu	Short Film
2016	Just Smile	Director and Writer	Chuka Ekweogwu, Hiba Hamoui, Mohammed al Marzooqi	Short Film
2015	The Man who Met the Angel	Director and Writer	Assem Kroma, Philip Rachid	Short Film
2015	Emotions: The Story of Adam	Director and Writer	Dana Elemary, Hiba Hamoui, Jeff Mullins	Short Film

== Awards ==
In 2018 he was awarded the Arabian Business Future Star.
