= Haifa Hussein =

Bahraini actress and singer (born 1979)

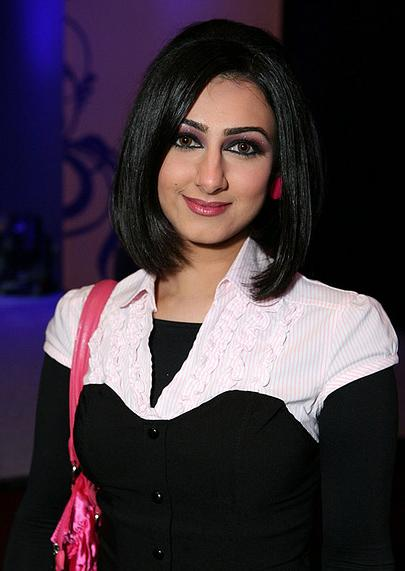
- Born: Haifa Hussein Yosef; 22 October 1979 (age 46); Muharraq, Bahrain
- Occupation: Actress
- Years active: 1999-present
- Spouse: Habib Ghalloum
- Children: 3

Haifa Hussein (born 22 October 1979) is a Bahraini actress and singer, well known for Khaliji television dramas in her native Bahrain. Haifa began her career in 1999, and achieved regional recognition for her main role in Lakita TV series.

== Personal life ==
Haifa Hussein is married to Emirati Director Habib Ghalloum (Arabic: حبيب غلوم) she has twins from him, and one son from previous marriage.
