= Veritas Films =

Emirati filmmaking company

Veritas Films is a filmmaking company based in the United Arab Emirates. It creates cultural and corporate non-fiction content, including corporate films, short and feature-length documentaries, TV programming, and videos, in both English and Arabic.

It is also an active contributor to the artistic and cultural offerings of the United Arab Emirates, through initiatives such as the multi-media documentary archiving of particular neighborhoods and the free, bi-annual film festival Mahmovies!

Its feature-length documentary Teta, Alf Marra won seven major awards at international festivals in 2010-12 and was the first documentary produced in the region to achieve significant distribution in the Middle East. Its second creative documentary film, "Champ of the Camp", has already received one award and several grants. It is ground-breaking in that it is the first creative documentary ever shot in the labor camps of the Persian Gulf region. It is due for completion in 2013.

== History ==
Veritas Films was founded in February 2008 by award-winning documentarian Mahmoud Kaabour.

== See also ==
- Teta, Alf Marra
- Mahmovies!
- Satwa Stories
- Being Osama
- My Neighborhood
