= War Machine (disambiguation) =

War Machine is a Marvel comic book superhero.

War Machine, War machine, or Warmachine may also refer to:

== Arts, entertainment, and media ==
=== Games ===
- War Machine, a 1989 video game published by Players Premier Software
- Warmachine, a miniatures wargame

=== Literature ===
- War Machine, a partwork published by Orbis Publishing
- Nomadology: The War Machine, a book by Gilles Deleuze and Félix Guattari
- The War Machine, a 1989 science fiction novel
- The War Machine (newsletter), a gaming magazine

=== Music ===
- War Machine (album), 1980, by Andrea True
- "War Machine", a song by AC/DC from Black Ice
- "War Machine", a song by Fightstar from Be Human
- "War Machine", a song by Kiss from Creatures of the Night
- "War Machine", a single by Dance Gavin Dance

=== Other uses in arts, entertainment, and media ===
- War Machine (2017 film), an American satirical war film
- The War Machines, a serial of the British science fiction TV series Doctor Who
- War Machine (2026 film), an action science-fiction film
- "War Machine" (On Call), a television episode

== Other uses ==
- War Machine (mixed martial artist) (born 1981), American former martial artist and convicted felon
- War Machine (professional wrestling), an American tag team
- War machine, shorthand for the military–industrial complex

== See also ==
- American War Machine: Deep Politics, the CIA Global Drug Connection, and the Road to Afghanistan, a 2010 non-fiction book by Peter Dale Scott
- Fighting machine, many of which are used in motorized warfare
- Mechanized warfare, which involves war machines
