= A Tale of Shadows =

- Theatrical release poster
- Directed by: Tariq Al Kazim
- Written by: Tariq Al Kazim
- Produced by: Yunjie Han
- Starring: Chuka Ekweogwu; Arzu Neuwirth; almer agmyren; Rik Aby
- Production company: The Madwriters
- Distributed by: Gulf Films
- Release date: 17 August 2017
- Running time: 1hr 47mins
- Country: United Arab Emirates
- Language: English
- Budget: 100,000$

A Tale of Shadows is a 2017 Emirati thriller film directed and written by Tariq Al Kazim and produced by Yunjie Han. The film stars Chuka Ekweogwu, Rik Aby, Arzu Neuwirth, and Almer Agmyren in the lead roles. The film was released all over the United Arab Emirates, and most of the shooting was done on the outskirts of the country. The film followed by the sequel A Tale of Shadows: Illusions.

== Cast ==
- Chuka Ekweogwu as The Gardener
- Arzu Neuwirth as The Woman in White
- Rik Aby as Garet
- Almer Agmyren as The Watchman
- Dijana Divjak as Mary

== Plot ==
The story centers on a poor, hardworking man who finds employment at a remote farm on the outskirts of the UAE. There, he encounters Garet, a psychopathic figure with a dark past tied to the farm. As the protagonist delves deeper into the farm's mysteries, he becomes entangled in a web of psychological horror and supernatural elements
