= Mahmoud Kaabour =

Lebanese filmmaker

Mahmoud Kaabour محمود قعبور
- Born: Mahmoud Kaabour; March 11, 1979 (age 47); Beirut, Lebanon
- Occupations: Managing director & filmmaker

Mahmoud Kaabour (in Arabic محمود قعبور) (born March 11, 1979) is a filmmaker, writer, and public speaker from Beirut.

== Education and occupation ==
He is the founder and managing director of Veritas Films, a UAE based company that specializes in the creation and production of non-fiction content. In 2015, he was named as one of the 100 Most Powerful Arabs under 40.

His commercial work includes directing tailor-made documentaries, including multiple films for The Ministry of Presidential Affairs and The Executive Affairs Authority in Abu Dhabi, the Abu Dhabi Urban Planning Council, Abu Dhabi Authority for Culture and Heritage, Dubai Holding and Dubai Investments subsidiaries.

== Film career ==
Kaabour's second feature-length film, Teta, Alf Marra, won him a New York Times "Critics' Pick" and a special jury mention for Best Arab Filmmaker at its world premiere at the Doha Tribeca Film Festival. The film has garnered an additional 5 major Audience Awards and Best Film awards and achieved several 'firsts' for the regional filmmaking industry. It was the first locally-produced documentary to show in cinemas in the UAE and secure regional distribution. It was also the first documentary produced in the GCC to qualify for Academy Awards qualification, with theatrical runs in Los Angeles and New York City.

His third feature-length film, Champ of the Camp is a documentary filmed in the controversial labor camps of the United Arab Emirates. The film premiered at the 10th Dubai International Film Festival on Dec 7th, 2013 in an historic outdoor screening at Burj Khalifa, the world's tallest tower. It attracted +1000 viewers.

== Awards ==
Mahmoud Kaabour

- 100 Most Powerful Arabs Under 40
- Humanitarian - Esquire Man At His Best Awards 2014

Champ of the Camp:

- March 2014: Best Production at Digital Studio Awards
- October 2011: Best Film Award in the "Celebrate Age" category at the Mumbai International Film Festival, India

Being Osama:

- Certificate of Merit for fighting racism from the Canadian Race Relations Foundation.

== Filmography ==
Directing

- 2004: Being Osama
- 2010: Teta, Alf Marra
- 2013: Champ of the Camp
