= Souad Abdullah =

Kuwaiti actress (born 1949)

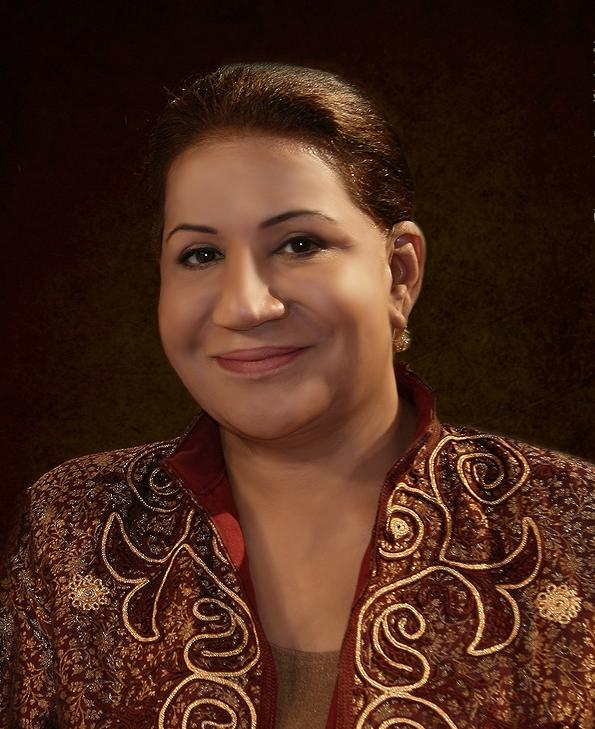
- Souad in 2008
- Born: Souad Abdullah Salem Al Abdullah; 20 May 1949 (age 77); Kingdom of Iraq
- Citizenship: Kuwaiti
- Occupation: Actress
- Years active: 1963–present
- Title: Cinderella of the Gulf Screen
- Spouse: Faisal Dahi (m. 1968)
- Children: 3

Suad Abdullah Salem Al-Abd (Arabic: سعاد عبد الله; born 20 May 1949) is a Kuwaiti actress of Iraqi origin. She began her career in 1963 as a child on stage.

== Filmography ==
=== Filmography ===
- Fedda Qalboha Abyad (Fedda White Heart)
- Ana ‘Endi Nus (I Have A Script)
- Um Al Banat (Mother of the Girls)
- Ala Al Dunia Al Salam (Peace to the World)
- Kharaj wa lam Ya'oud (Went out and Never Came Back)
- Birds on the water
- Eyal Al Theeb (The Kids of Wolf)
- Ruqeya wa Sepicha (Ruqeya and Sepicha)
- Al Bait Bait Aboona (The House is Our Father's)
- Dars Khususi (Tutorial)
- Khalty Qumasha (Aunt Qumasha)
- Al Akhdar (The Green)
- Al Atawiya
- Darb Al Zalaq (Slippery Path)
- Operet
- Khawat Donia (Donia's Sisters)
- Ya Khoie (O Brother)
- Al Wajiha (Interface)
- Gharib Al Dar (Strange House)
- Nour Fi Samae Safia (Nour in a Cloudless Sky)
- Forsa Thaniya (Another Chance)
- Ba'ad Al Shattat (After Parting)
- Shahin (Falcon)
- Mubarkine Haris AlEthnaine (Monday's Wedding)
- Zawarat Al Khamis (Thursday's Gathering)
- Thuraya (Star)
- Dar Al Zaman (A Long Time)
- Omna Rwehat Al Jannah (Our Mother is the Smell of Paradise)
- Sag AlBamboo (The Bamboo Stalk)
- Kan Fi Koli Zamana (It was at all times)
- The Cello
