= Hayat Al-Fahad =

Kuwaiti actress and producer (1948–2026)

- حياة الفهد
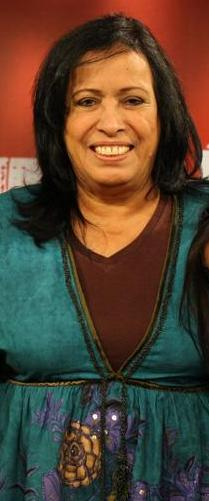
- Al-Fahad in 2010
- Born: Hayat Ahmad Yousef Al-Fahad; 15 April 1948; Sharq, Kuwait
- Died: 21 April 2026 (aged 78); Sharq, Kuwait
- Occupations: Actress, writer, film producer
- Years active: 1962–2025

Hayat Al-Fahad (Gulf Arabic: حياة الفهد, romanized: Ḥayāt il-Fahad, Gulf Arabic pronunciation: [ħəyäːt‿ɪlfəhəd]; 15 April 1948 – 21 April 2026) was a Kuwaiti actress, broadcaster, writer and producer best known for her Kuwaiti plays and the pop culture TV shows Khalti Qumasha, Ruqiya wa Sabika, Jarh Al Zaman, 'ndama Tu'Gany Al Zuhor.

== Background ==
Hayat Al-Fahad was born on 15 April 1948. She died on 21 April 2026, at the age of 78, following a prolonged illness.

== Controversy ==
On 25 April 2020 during the coronavirus pandemic, Hayat Al-Fahad publicly called for the deportation of expatriates from Kuwait on a local television channel. Her comments caused an uproar on social media, with various individuals criticizing her for her comments.

== Filmography ==
- 1972: Bas ya bahar

=== Television ===
- 2020: Um Hārūn, as Um Hārūn.
