= Ali F. Mostafa =

- Born: Ali Faisal Mostafa Bin Abdullatif; 25 September 1981 (age 45); London, England
- Education: London Film School

Ali Faisal Mostafa Bin Abdullatif (born 25 September 1981) is an Emirati filmmaker, director and producer who is credited as the director of the first Emirati feature-film City of Life (2009). He is a graduate of London Film School.

According to Mostafa, the inspiration for producing City of Life came because "I was tired of people comparing Dubai to a Disneyland. Most of them take one look at the glitzy buildings and assume it's an artificial place. My film has none of that. It has real people with real problems. Like any other city in the world, my film shows both the positives and the negatives." Mostafa faced initial controversy when some cinemas refused to showcase his movie who they claimed portrayed Dubai in a negative light. He however squashed the rumours, saying that with his film, he hoped to change the global perception of his hometown and put it on par with cities such as London and New York City which also face "real problems". According to data produced by Italia Film International the movie ranked second in the local box office and successfully made over 500,000 dirhams in its first weekend; there were reports that makers were deciding to show the film at the Cannes Film Festival in 2010.

Mostafa has been branded as "Best Emirati Filmmaker" in the Dubai International Film Festival (DIFF), won the 'Young Filmmaker of the Year' award at the Digital Studio Awards 2010, and Variety magazine quoted that he has proven to be the Gulf's first director of international standing.

While expanding his activities into brand ambassadorships, in 2011 Mostafa was asked to develop the first ever short series – Classified – to be broadcast online only and developed in the Middle East as part of his association with Land Rover.

Mostafa's second feature From A to B opened the Abu Dhabi Film Festival in October 2014, a first for an Emirati film, challenging stereotypical perceptions of Middle Eastern culture through a story of three best friends who take a road trip from Abu Dhabi to Beirut.

Mostafa's feature The Worthy, a collaboration between Imagination and Hollywood Producers Peter Safran and Steven Schneider, premiered at the BFA London Film Festival in October 2016, and received a gala premiere at the Dubai Film Festival in December 2016. A thriller set in the dystopian future where water is scarce, it was released on 23 February 2017. In 2022 Mostafa announced he is working on 'City of Life Continuum' the sequel to his 2009 breakout debut film City of Life

== Personal life ==
Mostafa's father is Emirati while his mother is British; he was born in London, England. Growing up in the U.A.E., he was interested in filming from his childhood and experimented making his own short films and mock TV ads. Upon completion of his education, Mostafa established a division from an existing company focusing on set and interior design. He then pursued his goal in 2003 when he enrolled at the London Film School to obtain an M.A. for practical training in film technique. He then set up his own production company AFM Films, and has worked on short films and TV commercials in various areas of production for over 10 years, although his focus remains on directing.

Mostafa has also directed a number of short movies; his 2005 film "Under the Sun" was screened at the DIFF and won the Emirates Film Competition in 2006. It was also screened at the Rome, Rhode Island and San Francisco International Film Festivals.

Mostafa also spends his time on humanitarian causes having participated in projects with Oxfam, whilst having also taken on the role of goodwill ambassador for Visit Britain.

Mostafa is married to lawyer and yoga instructor Adele O'Herlihy and has 3 children, his daughter and twin sons, from a previous marriage.
