= Image Nation Studios =

Produticion company

- Logo used from 2017 to 2026
- Abbreviation: IN
- Founded: November 16, 2008; 17 years ago
- Founder: United Arab Emirates Federal Government
- Founded at: Abu Dhabi
- Type: Governmental
- Location: Abu Dhabi, United Arab Emirates
- Origins: Distribution for UAE
- Region served: Middle East
- Products: Furry Vengeance; My Name Is Khan; Ghost Rider: Spirit of Vengeance; The Beaver; Late Night with the Devil; See § Films
- Services: Film production; Film post-production; Video game contributions
- Official language: Arabic; English
- Owner: United Arab Emirates Federal Government
- CEO: Ben Ross
- Chairman of the Board: Mohamed Al Mubarak
- Chief Financial Officer: Samer abu Haikal
- Head of Content: Derek Dauchy
- Parent organization: Creative Media Authority of the United Arab Emirates
- Expenses: 52 (2015)
- Formerly called: Imagenation (2008-2017); Image Nation Abu Dhabi (2017-2026)

Image Nation Studios (formerly Imagenation and Image Nation Abu Dhabi) is an Emirati film studio established in 2008. It is based at twofour54’s Yas Creative Hub in Abu Dhabi, United Arab Emirates.

The studio focuses on creating films, TV series, documentaries, and entertainment content, becoming the first UAE company to have multiple productions stream on Netflix.

The studio's productions have been screened at over 400 international film festivals and have received prestigious awards, including two Academy Awards, a BAFTA, and an Emmy. Image Nation Studios is a subdivision of Creative Media Authority.

== Background and history ==
Image Nation Studios was established as part of an economic diversification strategy in Abu Dhabi, with a focus on promoting cultural development. The goal was to create a media and entertainment industry that would contribute to the cultural identity and economic growth of the region. It focuses on supporting original ideas and fostering interest in the film and entertainment industry across the Gulf Cooperation Council (GCC) and the Middle East and North Africa (MENA) region.

Image Nation Studios produces feature films, documentaries, and television series. They have collaborated with international filmmakers and studios on several projects. In 2012, Image Nation formed a joint-venture with Walter F. Parkes and Laurie MacDonald, named Parkes + MacDonald Image Nation.

=== Arab Film Studio (AFS) ===
From 2011 to 2023, The Arab Film Studio (AFS) program, was offered by Image Nation, and provided training and development opportunities in the media industry. AFS students have screen their films and won awards at some of the top film festivals around the world.

== Select productions ==
=== Films ===
- Amreeka (2009)
- Shorts (2009)
- My Name Is Khan (2010)
- The Crazies (2010)
- Furry Vengeance (2010)
- Fair Game (2010)
- The Way Back (2010)
- The Beaver (2011)
- The Help (2011)
- Contagion (2011)
- Sea Shadow (2011)
- The Double (2011)
- The Best Exotic Marigold Hotel (2011)
- Ghost Rider: Spirit of Vengeance (2011)
- Men in Black 3 (2012)
- Djinn (2012)
- Flight (2012)
- Promised Land (2012)
- Snitch (2013)
- The Hundred-Foot Journey (2014)
- Life of Crime (2014)
- A Most Violent Year (2014)
- The Journey Home (2014)
- 99 Homes (2015)
- Keeping Up with the Joneses (2016)
- Rings (2017)
- The Circle (2017)
- Roman J. Israel, Esq. (2017)
- Benji (2018)
- Men in Black: International (2019)
- Prey (2019)
- Mosul (2019)
- Al Kameen (2021)
- Watcher (2022)
- Late Night with the Devil (2024)
- Dune: Part Three (2026)
- Anything but Ghosts (2027)
- Motorcade (TBA)

=== Documentaries ===
- Every Last Child (2014)
- As One: The Autism Project (2014)
- He Named Me Malala (2015)

=== Gaming ===
- The Lord of the Rings: Aragorn's Quest (2010)
- Super Scribblenauts (2010)
- F.E.A.R. 3 (2011)
- Harry Potter for Kinect (2012)
- Scribblenauts Unlimited (2012)
- Scribblenauts Remix (2013)
- Injustice: Gods Among Us (2013)
- Scribblenauts Unmasked: A DC Comics Adventure (2013)

== See also ==
- Abu Dhabi Developmental Holding Company
