= 82nd Venice International Film Festival =

2025 film festival in Italy

- Official poster by Manuele Fior
- Opening film: La grazia
- Closing film: Dog 51
- Location: Venice, Italy
- Founded: 1932
- Awards: Golden Lion: Father Mother Sister Brother
- Hosted by: Emanuela Fanelli
- Artistic director: Alberto Barbera
- Festival date: 27 August – 6 September 2025
- Website: www.labiennale.org/en/cinema

Venice Film Festival chronology
- 83rd 81st

The 82nd annual Venice International Film Festival was held from 27 August to 6 September 2025, at Venice Lido in Italy. American filmmaker Alexander Payne served as Jury President for the main competition. Italian actress Emanuela Fanelli hosted the opening and closing ceremonies.

The Golden Lion was awarded to Father Mother Sister Brother by Jim Jarmusch. German filmmaker Werner Herzog and American actress Kim Novak were awarded the Golden Lion for Lifetime Achievement during the festival.

Before and during the festival numerous Pro-Palestine demonstrations were held, supported by the festival organization or by stars attending, specially during the world premiere of Gaza-set docudrama The Voice of Hind Rajab, where further demonstrations took place demanding an end for the ongoing violence in Gaza during its 23-minutes long standing ovation. Artistic director Alberto Barbera endorsed any demonstrations, but stated that the protests should not disrupt the festival's schedule.

The festival opened with La grazia by Paolo Sorrentino, and closed with Dog 51 by Cédric Jimenez.

== Juries ==
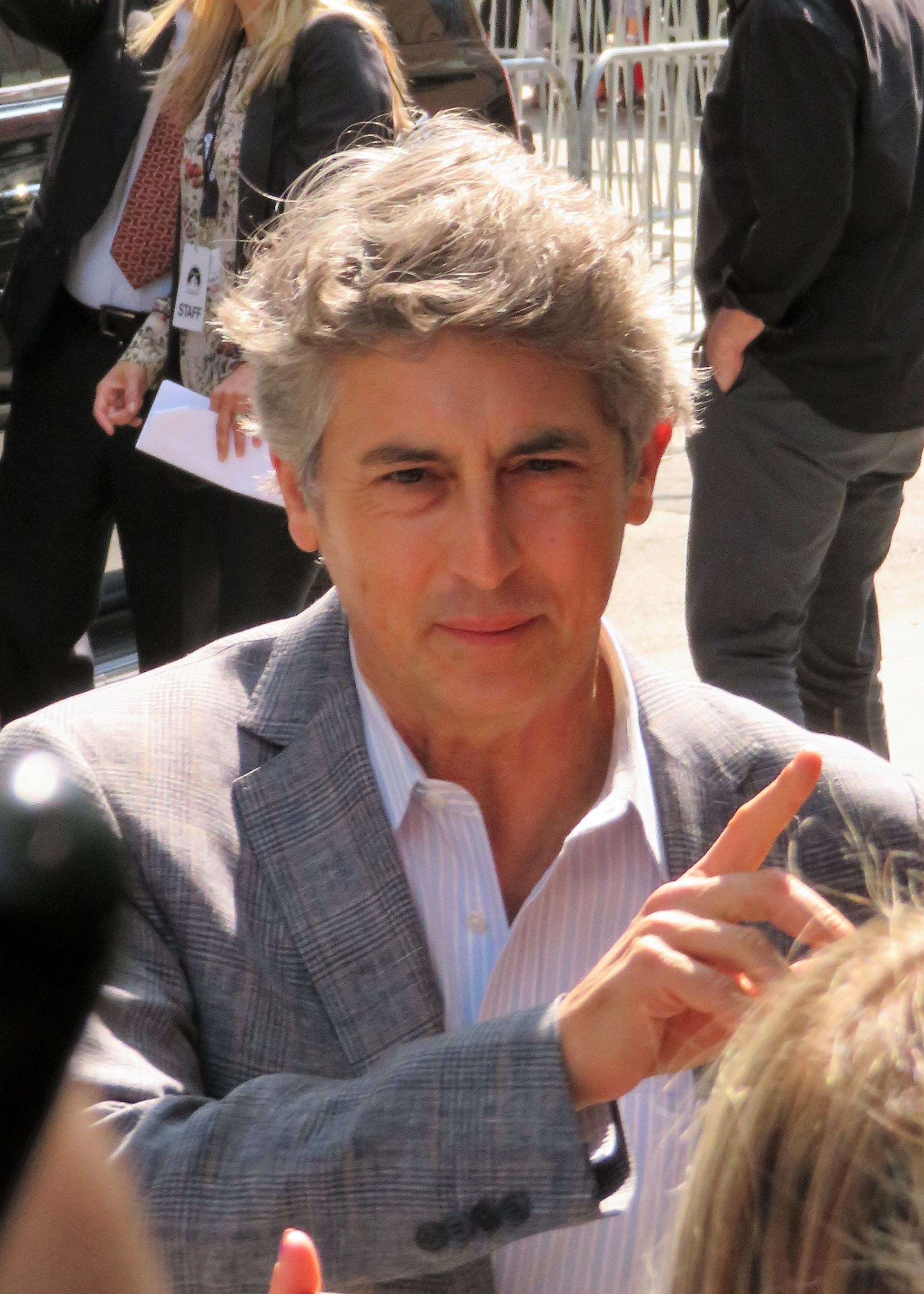
Alexander Payne, main competition Jury President

=== Main Competition (Venezia 82) ===
- Alexander Payne, American filmmaker – Jury President
- Stéphane Brizé, French filmmaker
- Maura Delpero, Italian filmmaker
- Cristian Mungiu, Romanian filmmaker and producer
- Mohammad Rasoulof, Iranian filmmaker and producer
- Fernanda Torres, Brazilian actress and writer
- Zhao Tao, Chinese actress

=== Orizzonti ===
- Julia Ducournau, French filmmaker – Jury President
- Yuri Ancarani, Italian filmmaker and video artist
- Fernando Enrique Juan Lima, Argentine film critic
- Shannon Murphy, Australian filmmaker
- RaMell Ross, American filmmaker and visual artist

=== Luigi de Laurentiis Award for Debut Film ===
- Charlotte Wells, Scottish filmmaker – Jury President
- Erige Sehiri, French-Tunisian filmmaker and producer
- Silvio Soldini, Italian filmmaker

=== Venice Classics ===
- Tommaso Santambrogio, Italian filmmaker – Jury President

=== Venice Immersive ===
- Eliza McNitt, American filmmaker – Jury President
- Gwenael François, French director and producer
- Boris Labbé, French visual artist

=== Giornate degli Autori ===
- Dag Johan Haugerud, Norwegian filmmaker – Jury President
- Francesca Andreoli, Italian producer
- Lina Soualem, Franco-Palestinian filmmaker
- Josh Siegel, MoMA film curator
- Sofian El Fani, Tunisian cinematographer

=== Golden Globe Impact Prize for Documentary ===
- Helen Hoehne, German journalist and Golden Globe president
- Geralyn Dreyfous, American producer and Impact Partners co-founder
- Jharrel Jerome, American actor
- Regina K. Scully, American producer and Artemis Rising Foundation founder
- Edoardo Ponti, Italian filmmaker
- Misan Sagay, British-Nigerian screenwriter
- Danielle Turkov, Belgian producer and Think-Film Impact Production founder
- Teo Yoo, German-Korean actor

== Official Selection ==
=== In Competition (Venezia 82) ===
The following twenty-one films were selected to the main competition for the Golden Lion:

| English Title | Original Title | Director(s) | Production Country |
|---|---|---|---|
| At Work | À pied d'œuvre | Valérie Donzelli | France |
| Below the Clouds | Sotto le nuvole | Gianfranco Rosi | Italy |
| Bravo Bene! | Un film fatto per Bene | Franco Maresco | Italy |
| Bugonia | | Yorgos Lanthimos | Ireland, South Korea, United Kingdom, United States |
| Duse | | Pietro Marcello | Italy, France |
| Elisa | Elisa — Io la volevo uccidere | Leonardo Di Costanzo | Italy, Switzerland |
| Father Mother Sister Brother | | Jim Jarmusch | United States, Ireland, France |
| Frankenstein | | Guillermo del Toro | United States |
| Girl | 女孩 | Shu Qi | Taiwan, China |
| La grazia (opening film) | | Paolo Sorrentino | Italy |
| A House of Dynamite | | Kathryn Bigelow | United States |
| Jay Kelly | | Noah Baumbach | United Kingdom, United States |
| No Other Choice | 어쩔수가없다 | Park Chan-wook | South Korea |
| Orphan | Árva | László Nemes | Hungary, France, Germany, United Kingdom |
| Silent Friend | Stille Freundin | Ildikó Enyedi | Germany, France, Hungary |
| The Smashing Machine | | Benny Safdie | United States |
| The Stranger | L'Étranger | François Ozon | France |
| The Sun Rises on Us All | 日掛中天 | Cai Shangjun | China |
| The Testament of Ann Lee | | Mona Fastvold | United Kingdom, Sweden, Hungary |
| The Voice of Hind Rajab | صوت هند رجب | Kaouther Ben Hania | Tunisia, France |
| The Wizard of the Kremlin | Le mage du Kremlin | Olivier Assayas | France |

=== Out of Competition ===
The following films were selected to be screened out of competition:

| English Title | Original Title | Director(s) | Production Country |
Fiction
| After the Hunt | | Luca Guadagnino | Italy, United States |
| Dog 51 (closing film) | Chien 51 | Cédric Jimenez | France, Belgium |
| Dead Man's Wire | | Gus Van Sant | United States |
| The Holy Boy | La Valle dei Sorrisi | Paolo Strippoli | Italy, Slovenia |
| Hungry Bird | L'Isola di Andrea | Antonio Capuano | Italy |
| In the Hand of Dante | | Julian Schnabel | United Kingdom, Italy, Chile, United States |
| The Last Viking | Den Sidste Viking | Anders Thomas Jensen | Denmark, Sweden |
| Orfeo | | Virgilio Villoresi | Italy |
| My Tennis Maestro | Il Maestro | Andrea Di Stefano | Italy |
| Scarlet | 果てしなきスカーレット | Mamoru Hosoda | Japan |
| Sermon to the Void | Boşluğa xütbə | Hilal Baydarov | Azerbaijan, Mexico, Turkey |
Non-fiction
| Angela’s Diaries. Two Filmmakers. Chapter Three | Il Diari di Angela - Noi due Cineasti. Capitolo Terzo | Yervante Gianikian and Angela Ricci Lucchi | Italy |
| Back Home | 回家 | Tsai Ming-liang | Taiwan |
| Broken English | | Iain Forsyth and Jane Pollard | United Kingdom |
| Cover-Up | | Laura Poitras and Mark Obenhaus | United States |
| Director's Diary | Записная книжка режиссёра | Alexander Sokurov | Russia, Italy |
| | Ferdinando Scianna - Il Fotografo dell'Ombra | Roberto Andò | Italy |
| Ghost Elephants | | Werner Herzog | United States |
| Kabul, Between Prayers | | Aboozar Amini | Netherlands, Belgium |
| Kim Novak's Vertigo | | Alexandre O. Philippe | United States |
| Marc by Sofia | | Sofia Coppola | United States |
| | Dai nostri inviati.: La Rai racconta la Mostra del Cinema di Venezia 1990-2000 | Giuseppe Giannotti and Enrico Salvatori | Italy |
| My Father and Qaddafi | بابا و القذافي | Jihan K | Libya, United States |
| Notes of a True Criminal | Записки настоящего преступника | Alexander Rodnyansky and Andriy Alferov | Ukraine, United States |
| Our Land | Nuestra tierra | Lucrecia Martel | Argentina, Mexico, France, United States, Netherlands, Denmark |
| Remake | | Ross McElwee | United States |
| The Tale of Silyan | Силјан | Tamara Kotevska | North Macedonia |
Film & Music
| Francesco de Gregori Nevergreen | | Stefano Pistolini | Italy |
| Newport and the Great Folk Dream | | Robert Gordon | United States |
| Nino: A Journey of 18 Days | Nino. 18 Giorni | Toni d'Angelo | Italy |
| Piero Pelù | Piero Pelù Rumore Dentro | Francesco Fei | Italy |
Series
| Etty (6 episodes) | | Hagai Levi | France, Germany, Netherlands |
| The Monster of Florence (4 episodes) | Il Mostro | Stefano Sollima | Italy |
| Portobello (episodes 1 and 2) | | Marco Bellocchio | Italy, France |
| A Prophet (8 episodes) | Un Prophète | Enrico Maria Artale | France |
Short Films
| Boomerang Atomic | | Rachid Bouchareb | France |
| Goffredo Felicissimo? | | Franco Maresco | Italy |
| How to Shoot a Ghost | | Charlie Kaufman | United States, Greece |
| Origin, the Venetian Lagoon | | Yann Arthus-Bertrand | France, Italy |
| Rukeli | | Alessandro Rak | Italy, Sweden |

=== Orizzonti ===
The following films were selected to the Orizzonti main competition:

| English Title | Original Title | Director(s) | Production Country |
|---|---|---|---|
| Barrio Triste | | Stillz | Colombia, United States |
| Divine Comedy | کمدی الهی | Ali Asgari | Iran, Italy, France, Germany, Turkey |
| Father | Otec | Tereza Nvotová | Slovakia, Czech Republic, Poland |
| Funeral Casino Blues | | Roderick Warich | Germany |
| Human Resource | พนักงานใหม่ (โปรดรับไว้พิจารณา) | Nawapol Thamrongrattanarit | Thailand |
| The Ivy | Hiedra | Ana Cristina Barragán | Ecuador, Mexico, France, Spain |
| The Kidnapping of Arabella | Il rapimento di Arabella | Carolina Cavalli | Italy |
| Late Fame | | Kent Jones | United States |
| Lost Land | Harà Watan | Akio Fujimoto | Japan, France, Malaysia, Germany |
| Milk Teeth | Dinți de lapte | Mihai Mincan | Romania, France, Denmark, Greece, Bulgaria |
| Mother | | Teona Strugar Mitevska | North Macedonia, Belgium, Sweden, Denmark, Bosnia and Herzegovina |
| On the Road | En el camino | David Pablos | Mexico, France |
| Pin de fartie | | Alejo Moguillansky | Argentina |
| Rose of Nevada | | Mark Jenkin | United Kingdom |
| The Site | Grand Ciel | Akihiro Hata | France, Luxembourg |
| Songs of Forgotten Trees | | Anuparna Roy | India |
| The Souffleur | | Gastón Solnicki | Austria, Argentina |
| Strange River | Estrany riu | Jaume Claret Muxart | Spain, Germany |
| A Year of School | Un anno di scuola | Laura Samani | Italy, France |

=== Orizzonti Short Films Competition ===
The following films were selected to compete for the Orizzonti Award for Best Short Film, assigned by the Jury of the Orizzonti section:

| English Title | Original Title | Director(s) | Production Country |
|---|---|---|---|
| Coyotes | | Said Zagha | Palestine, France, Jordan, United Kingdom |
| The Curfew | | Shehrezad Maher | United States |
| I Hear It Still | Je crois entendre encore | Constance Bonnot | France |
| Kushta Mayn, My Constantinople | Kushta Mayn, la mia Costantinopoli | Nicolò Folin | Italy |
| The Lifeline | La ligne de vie | Hugo Becker | France |
| Lion Rock | | Nick Mayow and Prisca Bouchet | New Zealand |
| Merrimundi | | Niles Atallah | Chile |
| Norheimsund | | Ana Alpizar | Cuba, United States |
| The Origin of the World | El Origen del Mundo | Jazmin Lopez | Argentina |
| Praying Mantis | 螳螂 | Joe Hsieh and Yonfan | Taiwan, Hong Kong |
| Saint Simeon | | Olubunmi Ogunsola | Nigeria |
| A Soil, A Culture, A River, A People | 又见炊烟 | Viv Li | China, Germany, Belgium |
| Unavailable | Nedostupni | Kyrylo Zemlyanyi | Ukraine, France, Belgium, Bulgaria, Netherlands |
| Without Kelly | | Lovisa Sirén | Sweden |
Out of Competition - Homage to the New Zealand's Film School “A Wave in the Ocean” (AWITO)
| The Brightness | | Freya Silas Finch | New Zealand |
| The Girl Next Door | | Mingjian Cui | New Zealand |
| Girl Time | | Eleanor Bishop | New Zealand |
| In Conversation with Jack Maurer | | Hash | New Zealand |
| Kurī | | Ana Chaya Scotney | New Zealand |
| Socks | | Todd Karehana | New Zealand |
| A Very Good Boy | | Samuel Te Kani | New Zealand |

=== Venice Spotlight ===
Formerly called Orizzonti Extra, the section was officially renamed Venice Spotlight in this year edition. The collateral section programs independent films with commercial appeal from newcomers filmmakers or internationally established ones. The section winner is attributed by popular vote at the end of the festival, the following films were selected:

| English Title | Original Title | Director(s) | Production Country |
|---|---|---|---|
| Calle Málaga | | Maryam Touzani | Morocco, France, Spain, Germany, Belgium |
| Hijra | هجری | Shahad Ameen | Saudi Arabia, Iraq, Egypt, United Kingdom |
| It Would Be Night in Caracas | Aún es de noche en Caracas | Mariana Rondón and Marite Ugas | Mexico, Venezuela |
| A Loose End | Un Cabo Suelto | Daniel Hendler | Uruguay, Argentina, Spain |
| Made In EU | | Stephan Komandarev | Bulgaria, Germany, Czech Republic |
| Motor City | | Potsy Ponciroli | United States |
| Silent Rebellion | A Bras-le-Corps | Marie-Elsa Sgualdo | Switzerland, France, Belgium |
| Tired of Killing: Autobiography of an Assassin | Ammazzare stanca | Daniele Vicari | Italy |

=== Venice Classics ===
Filmmaker Tommaso Santambrogio served as Jury President over 24 students recommended by professors of film studies from various Italian universities, the group will award the prizes for Best Restored Film and for the Best Documentary About Cinema. The following films were selected to the Venice Classics section:

| English Title | Original Title | Director(s) | Production Country | Restored by |
Restored Prints
| 3:10 to Yuma (1957) | | Delmer Daves | United States | Sony Pictures |
| Aniki-Bóbó (1942) | | Manoel de Oliveira | Portugal | Cinemateca Portuguesa, Melgaço Museum of Cinema |
| Bashu, the Little Stranger (1986) | باشو غریبه کوچک | Bahram Beyzai | Iran | Roashana Studios, KANOON |
| Blind Chance (1987) | Przypadek | Krzysztof Kieślowski | Poland | DI Factory |
| The Delicate Delinquent (1957) | | Don McGuire | United States | Paramount Pictures |
| Do Bigha Zamin (1953) | दो बीघा ज़मीन | Bimal Roy | India | Film Heritage Foundation, The Criterion Collection |
| The Ghost (1963) | Lo Spettro | Riccardo Freda | Italy | Severin Films |
| House of Strangers (1949) | | Joseph L. Mankiewicz | United States | Walt Disney Studios, The Film Foundation |
| I Married You for Fun (1967) | Ti ho sposato per allegria | Luciano Salce | Italy | Cinecittà |
| Kwaidan (1964) | 怪談 | Masaki Kobayashi | Japan | Toho |
| Lolita (1962) | | Stanley Kubrick | United Kingdom, United States | The Criterion Collection, Warner Bros. |
| The Magnificent Cuckold (1964) | Il magnifico cornuto | Antonio Pietrangeli | Italy | Fondazione Cineteca di Bologna, Compass Film |
| Mark of the Renegade (1951) | | Hugo Fregonese | United States | Universal Pictures |
| Matador (1986) | | Pedro Almodóvar | Spain | Video Mercury Films |
| Odd Obsession (1959) | 鍵 | Kon Ichikawa | Japan | Kadokawa Corporation |
| Queen Kelly (1929) | | Erich von Stroheim | United States | Milestone Films |
| Port of Shadows (1938) | Le Quai des brumes | Marcel Carné | France | StudioCanal, Cinémathèque française |
| Rome 11:00 (1952) | Roma, ore 11 | Giuseppe De Santis | Italy | Centro Sperimentale di Cinematografia, Cineteca Nazionale |
| Vive l'amour (1994) | 愛情萬歲 | Tsai Ming-liang | Taiwan | Taiwan Film and Audiovisual Institute |
Documentaries About Cinema
| Boorman and the Devil | | David Kittredge | United States | |
| Elvira Notari: Oltre il Silenzio | | Valerio Ciriaci | Italy, United States | |
| Holofiction | | Michal Kosakowski | Germany, Austria | |
| Louis Malle, Le Révolté | | Claire Duguet | France | |
| Mata Hari | | Joe Beshenkovsky and James Smith | United States | |
| Memory of the Forgotten | Memoria de los Olvidados | Javier Espada | Spain, Mexico, United States | |
| Megadoc | | Mike Figgis | United States | |
| Sangre del Toro | | Yves Montmayeur | France, United Kingdom | |
| The Ozu Diaries | | Daniel Raim | United States | |

=== Venice Immersive ===
The Venice Immersive is entirely devoted to immersive media and includes all XR means of creative expression, from 360° videos to XR works of any length, including installations and virtual worlds. The following projects were selected for the XR - Extended Reality section of La Biennale di Venezia:

==== In Competition ====
| English Title | Original Title | Director(s) | Production Country |
|---|---|---|---|
| 1968 | | Rose Bond | United States |
| 8PM and the Cat | 저녁 8시와 고양이 | Minhyuk Che | South Korea |
| Alien Perspective | | Jung Ah Suh and Cristina Rambaldi | United States, Italy |
| Asteroid | | Doug Liman | United States, Canada |
| The Big Cube | | Menghui Huang | Finland, Belgium, China, Portugal |
| Black Cats & Chequered Flags | | Elisabetta Rotolo and Siobhan Mcdonnell | |
| Blur | | Craig Quintero and Phoebe Greenberg | Canada, Taiwan |
| The Clouds are Two Thousand Meters Up | 雲在兩千米 | Singing Chen | Taiwan, Germany |
| Collective Body | | Sarah Silverblatt-Buser | France, United States |
| Creation of the Worlds | | Kristina Buozyté and Vitalijus Zukas | Lithuania |
| Dance Dance Dance – Matisse | Danse Danse Danse – Matisse | Agnès Molia and Gordon | France |
| Dark Rooms | | Mads Damsbo, Laurits Flensted Jensen and Anne Sofie Steen Sverdrup | Denmark, Germany, Taiwan |
| Eddie and I | | Maya Shekel | Israel, Germany, France |
| Empathy Creatures | | Mélodie Mousset | Switzerland |
| The Exploding Girl VR | La fille qui explose VR | Caroline Poggi and Jonathan Vinel | France, Greece |
| Face Jumping | | Danny Cannizzaro and Samantha Gorman | United States |
| The Great Escape | | Joren Vandenbroucke | Belgium, Luxembourg |
| The Great Orator | | Daniel Ernst | Netherlands |
| Heartbeat – Son coeur a trouvé sa cadence dans le silence des rencontres | | Fanny Fortage | France |
| If You See a Cat | | Atsushi Wada | Japan |
| Less Than 5GR or Saffron | | Négar Motevalymeidanshah | France |
| A Long Goodbye | | Kate Voet and Victor Maes | Belgium, Luxembourg, Netherlands |
| La Magie Opéra | | Jonathan Astruc | France |
| Mirage | | Naima Karim and Aleena Hanif | Saudi Arabia, Netherlands |
| Mulan2125 | 木兰2125 | Mo Huang | China |
| Reflections of Little Red Dot | | Chloé Lee | Germany, United States |
| The Sad Story of the Little Mouse Who Wanted to Become Somebody | La Triste Histoire de la Petite Souris qui Voulait Absolument Devenir Quelqu'un | Nicolas Bourniquel | France, Germany, Belgium |
| Sense of Nowhere | | Hsin-Hsuan Yeh | Taiwan, Finland, Belgium, Portugal, France |
| The Shadow | L'Ombre | Blanca Li and Édith Canat de Chizy | France, Taiwan |
| The Time Before | | Leo Metcalf and Michael Golembewski | United Kingdom |

=== Biennale College - Cinema ===
The following films were selected for the Biennale College - Cinema section:

| English Title | Original Title | Director(s) | Production Country |
|---|---|---|---|
| Becoming Human | ជាតិជាមនុស្សា | Polen Ly | Cambodia |
| Lamb of God | Agnus Dei | Massimiliano Camaiti | Italy |
| One Woman One Bra | | Vincho Nchogu | Kenya, Nigeria |
| Secret of a Mountain Serpent | | Nidhi Saxena | India, Italy, Sri Lanka |

=== Final Cut ===
The section is providing since 2013 support in the completion of films from African and Middle East countries. The following eight work-in-progress films have been selected for the 13th edition of Final Cut in Venice:

| English Title | Original Title | Director(s) | Production Country |
Fiction
| House of the Wind | La maison du vent | Kouemo Yanghu Auguste Bernard | Cameroon, Benin, France, Belgium |
| My Semba | Meu Semba | Hugo Salvaterra | Angola |
| Standing at the Ruins | Al Woqoof ala el Atlal | Saeed Taji Farouky | Egypt, United Kingdom |
| The Station | Al Mahattah | Sara Ishaq | Yemen, Jordan, France, Germany, Netherlands, Norway, Qatar |
| Yesterday the Eye Didn't Sleep | | Rakan Mayasi | Belgium, Lebanon, Palestine |
Documentary
| Legacy | Soleil, Lune, Étoiles | Mamadou Dia | Senegal, France |
| Out of School | La cour des grands | Hind Bensari | Denmark, Morocco |
| Untitled Project from Yemen | | Mariam Al-Dhubhani | Yemen, Qatar, Norway, France |

== Independent Sections ==
=== 40. Settimana Internazionale della Critica ===
The following films were selected to the International Critics’ Week sections:

| English Title | Original Title | Director(s) | Production Country |
In Competition
| Agon | | Giulio Bertelli | Italy, United States, France |
| Cotton Queen | ملكة القطن | Suzannah Mirghani | Germany, France, Palestine, Egypt, Qatar, Saudi Arabia |
| Cora | Gorgonà | Evi Kalogiropoulou | Greece, France |
| Ish | | Imran Perretta | United Kingdom |
| Roqia | | Yanis Koussim | Algeria, France, Qatar, Saudi Arabia |
| Straight Circle | | Oscar Hudson | United States, United Kingdom, South Africa |
| Waking Hours | Ore di veglia | Federico Cammarata and Filippo Foscarini | Italy |
Out of Competition
| Stereo Girls (opening film) | Les Immortelles | Caroline Deruas Peano | France, Canada |
| 100 Nights of Hero (closing film) | | Julia Jackman | United Kingdom, United States |
SIC@SIC Short Italian Cinema - In Competition
| Arca | | Lorenzo Quagliozzi | Italy |
| Family Feast | Festa in Famiglia | Nadir Taji | Italy |
| Marina | | Paoli De Luca | Italy |
| The Motorcycle | La Moto | Matteo Giampetruzzi | Italy, Denmark, Spain |
| El pütì pèrs | The Lost Child | Paolo Baiguera | Italy |
| The Pørnøgraphər | | Hariel | Italy |
| Saints | Sante | Valeria Gaudieri | Italy |
SIC@SIC Short Italian Cinema - Out of Competition
| Remains (opening short film) | Restare | Fabio Bobbio | Italy |
| Confini, Canti (closing short film) | | Simone Massi | Italy |

=== 22nd Giornate degli Autori ===
The following films were selected to the Giornate degli Autori section:

| English Title | Original Title | Director(s) | Production Country |
In Competition
| Bearcave | Αρκουδότρυπα | Stergios Dinopoulos and Krysianna B. Papadakis | Greece |
| Gioia | La gioia | Nicolangelo Gelormini | Italy |
| Inside Amir | درون امیر | Amir Azizi | Iran |
| Last Night I Conquered the City of Thebes | Anoche Conquisté Tebas | Gabriel Azorín | Spain, Portugal |
| Memory (opening film) | | Vladlena Sandu | France, Netherlands |
| Memory of Princess Mumbi | | Damien Hauser | Kenya, Switzerland |
| Past Future Continuous | گذشته آینده استمراری | Morteza Ahmadvand and Firouzeh Khosrovani | Iran, Norway, Italy |
| A Sad and Beautiful World | نجوم الأمل و الألم | Cyril Aris | Lebanon, United States, Germany, Saudi Arabia, Qatar |
| Short Summer | | Nastia Korkia | Germany, France, Serbia |
| Vanilla | Vainilla | Mayra Hermosillo | Mexico |
Special Events
| Damned If You Do, Damned If You Don't (closing film) | Come ti muovi, sbagli | Gianni Di Gregorio | Italy |
| Do You Love Me | | Lana Daher | France, Lebanon, Germany, Qatar |
| I Want Her Dead | Il quieto vivere | Gianluca Matarrese | Italy, Switzerland |
| Laguna | | Šarūnas Bartas | Lithuania, France |
| Who Is Still Alive | Qui vit encore | Nicolas Wadimoff | Switzerland |
| Writing Life – Annie Ernaux Through the Eyes of High School Students | Écrire la vie – Annie Ernaux racontée par des lycéennes et de lycéens | Claire Simon | France |
Miu Miu Women's Tales
| #29 Autobiografia di una borsetta | | Joanna Hogg | Italy |
| #30 Fragments For Venus | | Alice Diop | United States, France |
Venetian Nights
| 6:06 | | Tekla Taidelli | Italy, Portugal |
| Be Loved | Amata | Elisa Amoruso | Italy |
| Confession – How I Found Out I Wouldn't Make the Revolution | Confiteor – Come Scoprii Che Non Avrei Fatto la Rivoluzione | Bonifacio Angius | Italy |
| Dom | | Massimiliano Battistella | Italy, Bosnia Herzegovina |
| Full Speed Backward! | Indietro Così! | Antonio Morabito | Italy |
| Life Beyond the Pine Curtain – America the Invisible | Life Beyond the Pine Curtain – L’America degli Invisibli | Giovanni Troilo | Italy |
| A Near Thing | Una Cosa Vicina | Loris G. Nese | Italy |
| A State Film | Film di Stato | Roland Sejko | Italy |
| Toni, My Father | Toni mio Padre | Anna Negri | Italy |

== Official Awards ==
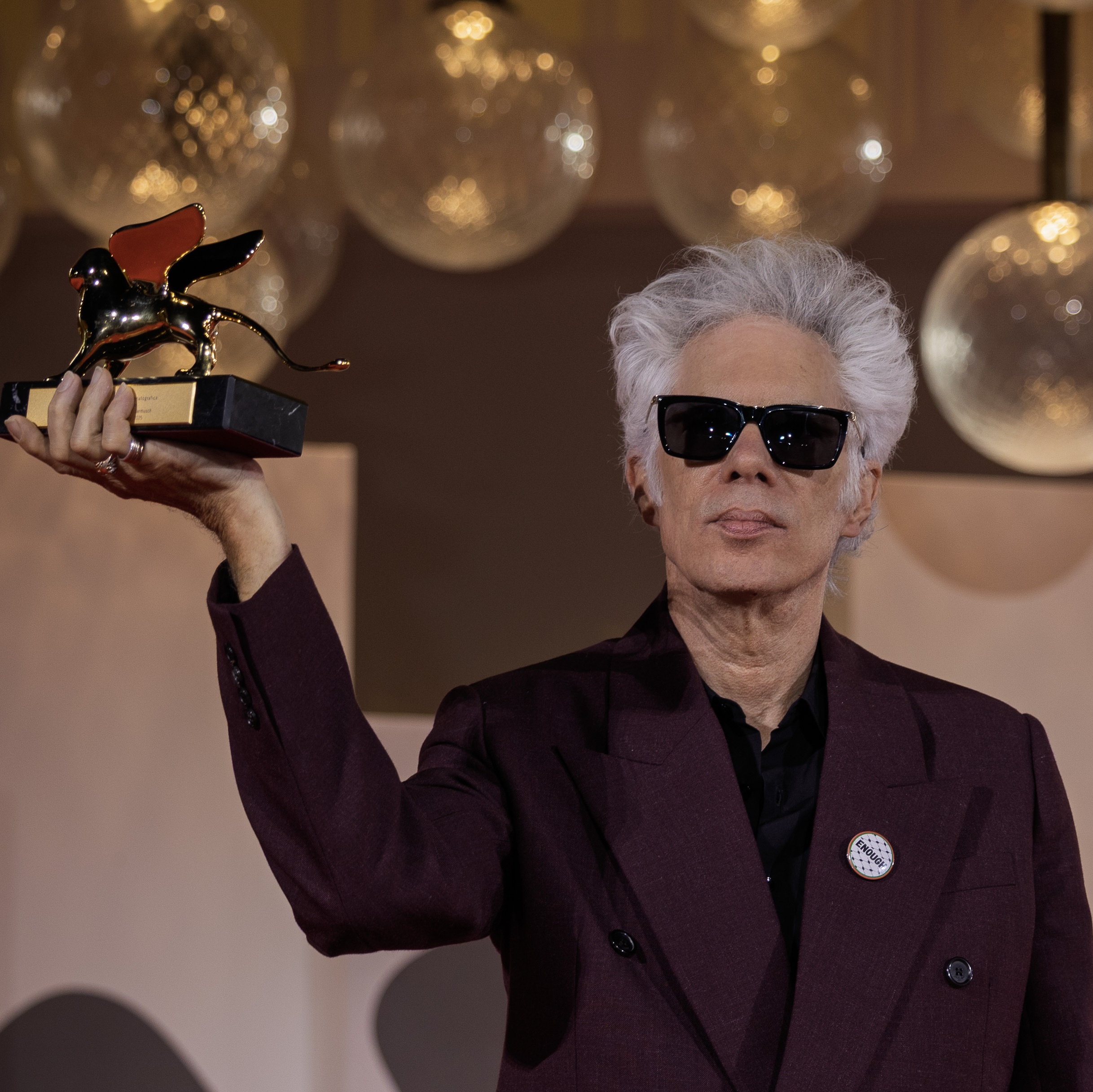
Golden Lion winner: Jim Jarmusch

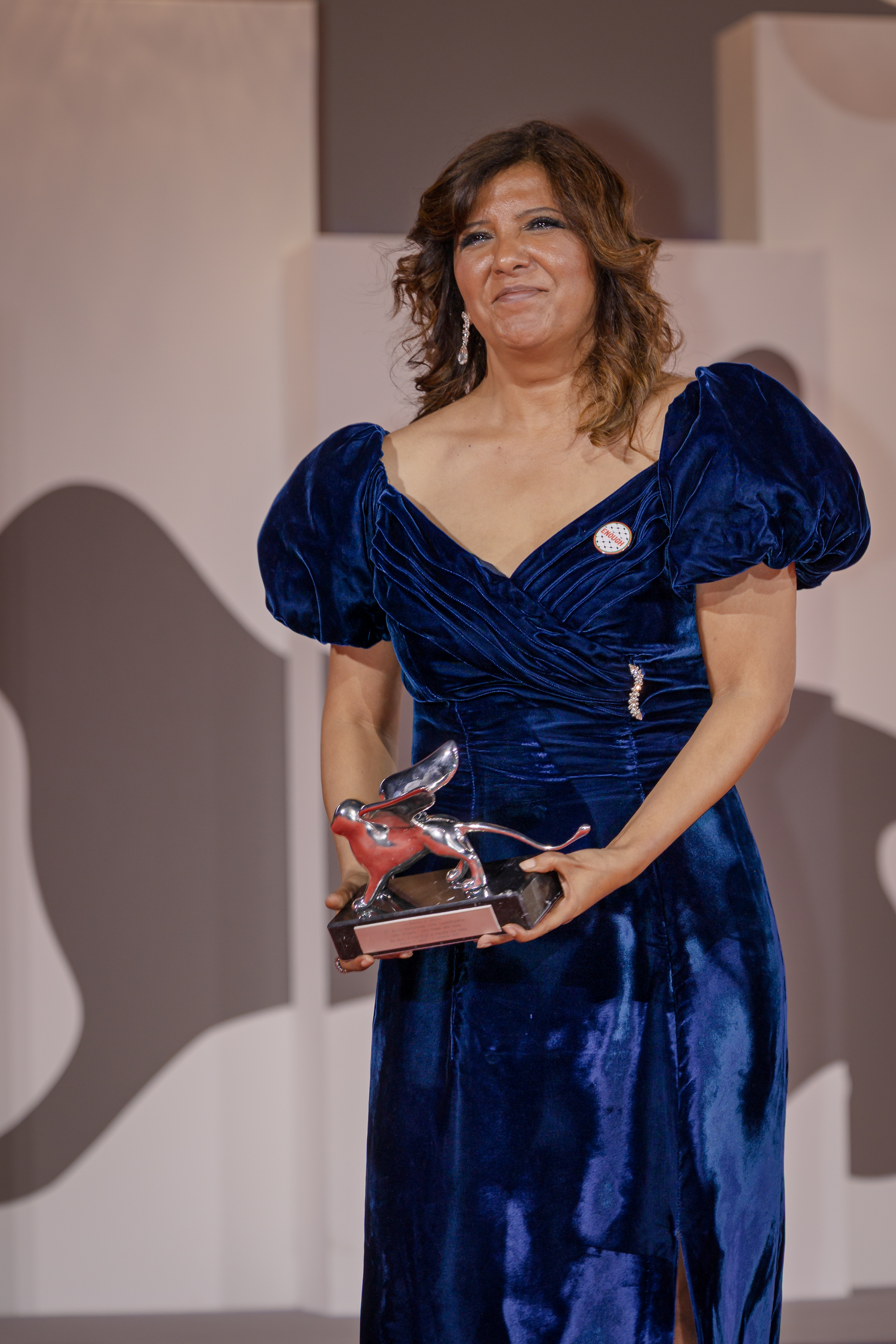
Grande Jury Prize winner: Kaouther Ben Hania

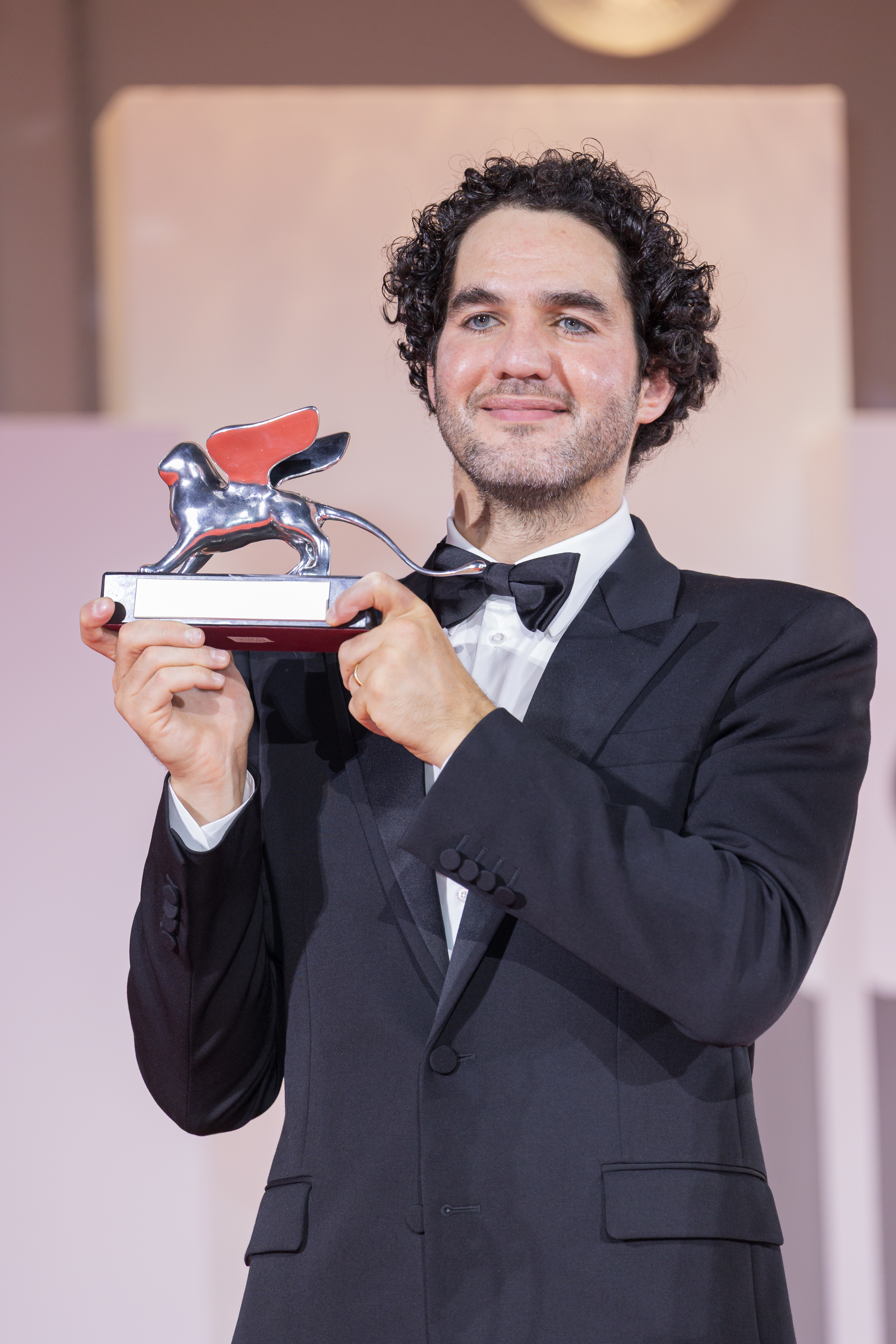
Silver Lion winner: Benny Safdie

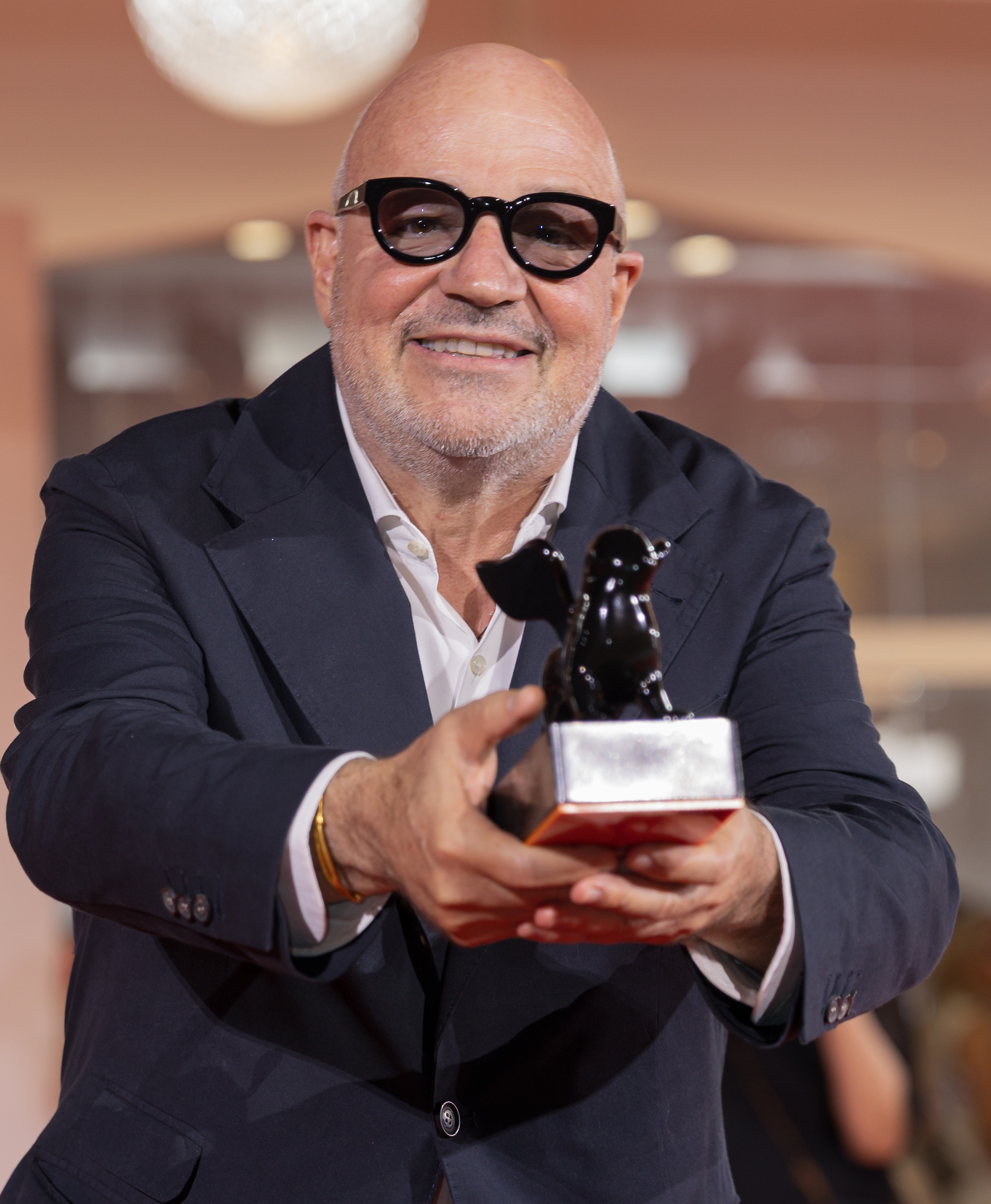
Special Jury Prize winner: Gianfranco Rosi

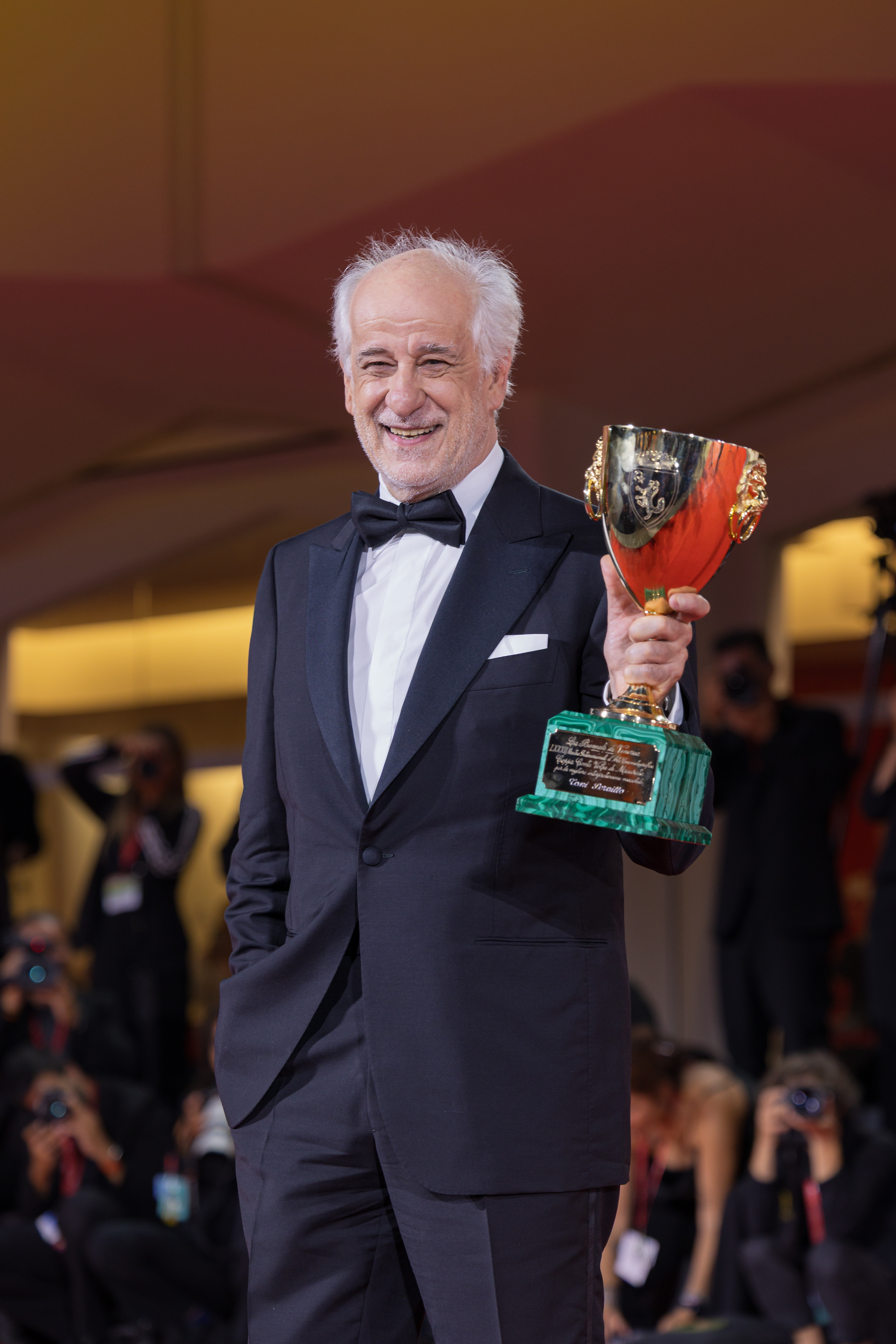
Volpi Cup for Best Actor winner: Toni Servillo

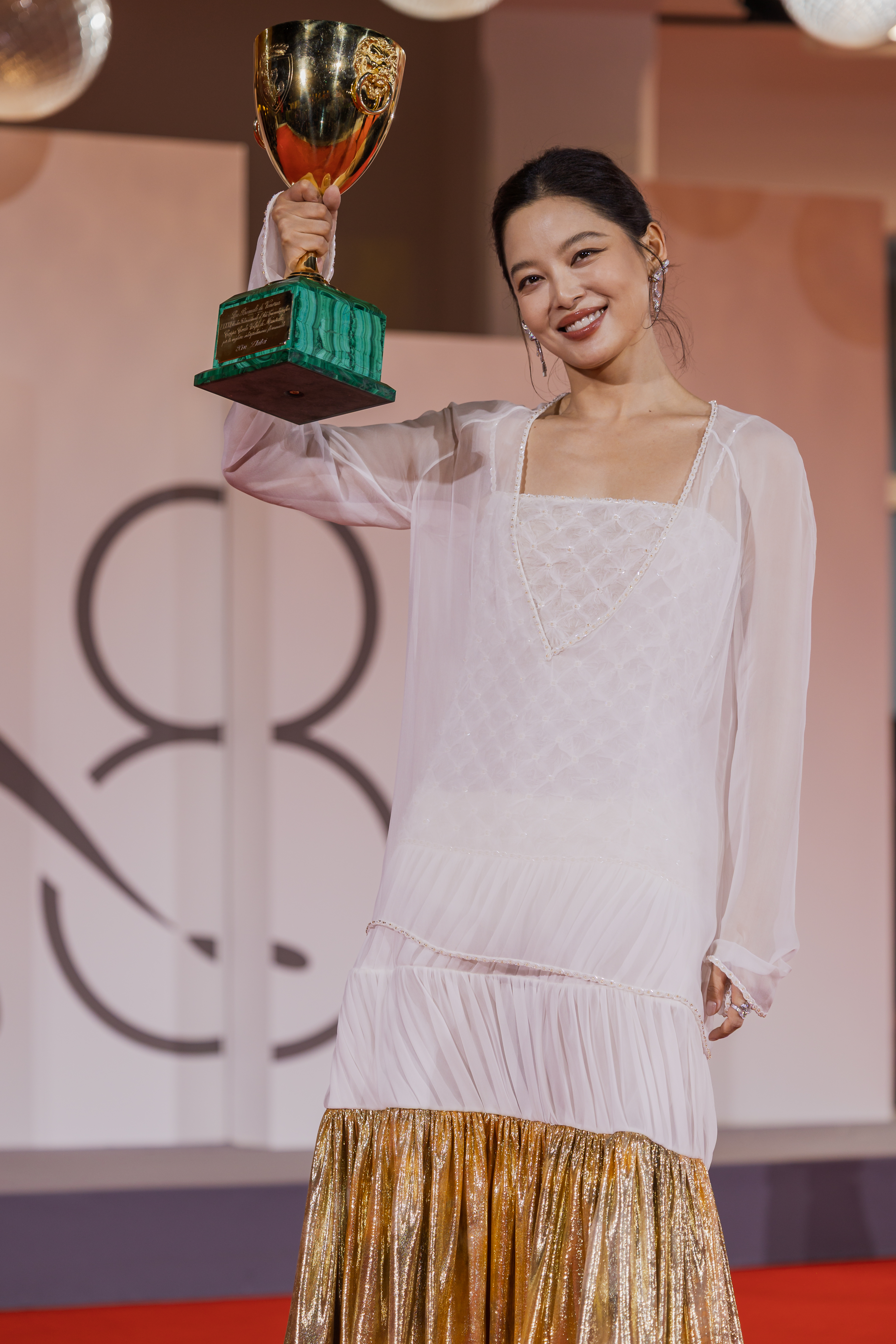
Volpi Cup for Best Actress winner: Xin Zhilei

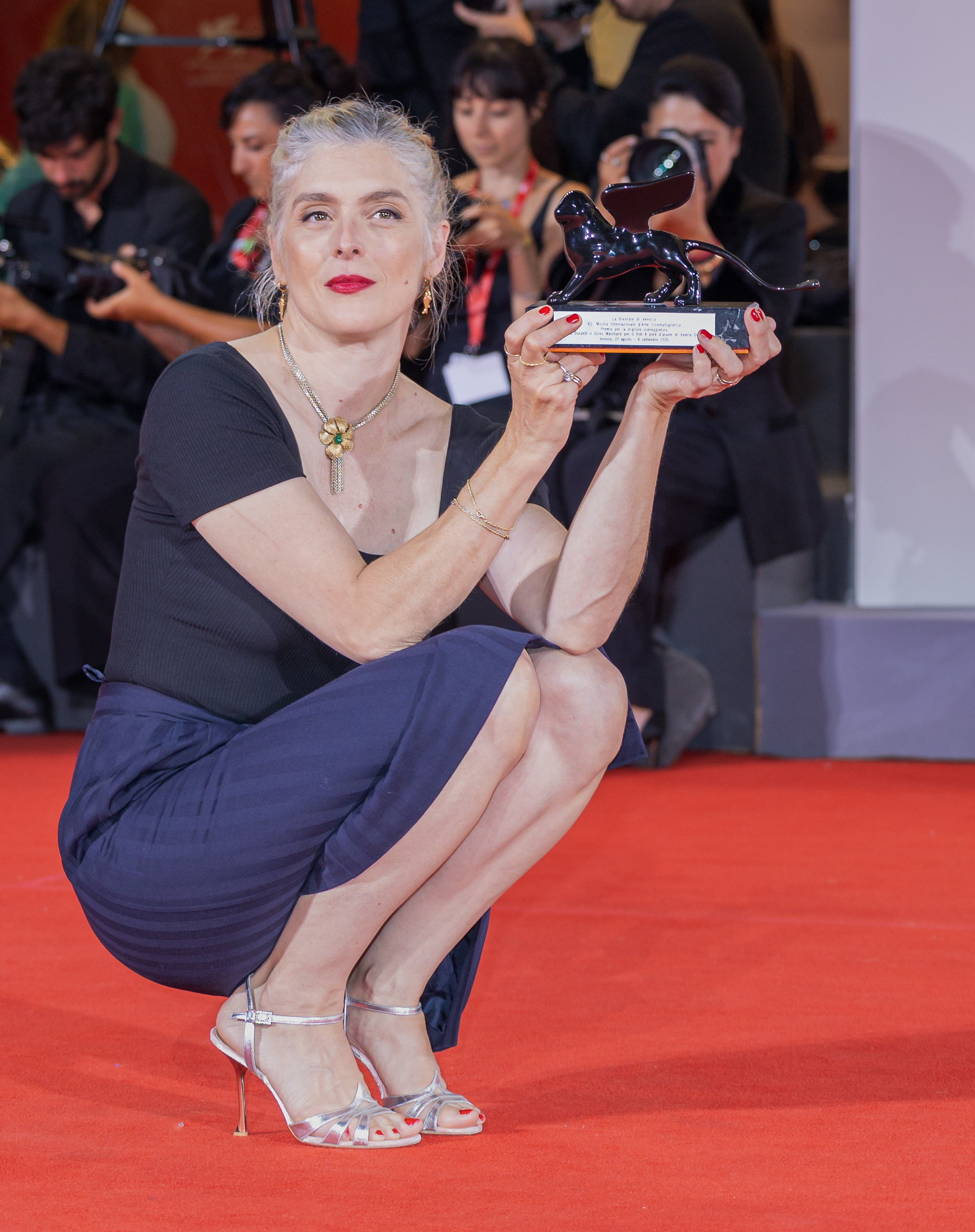
Best Screenplay winner: Valérie Donzelli

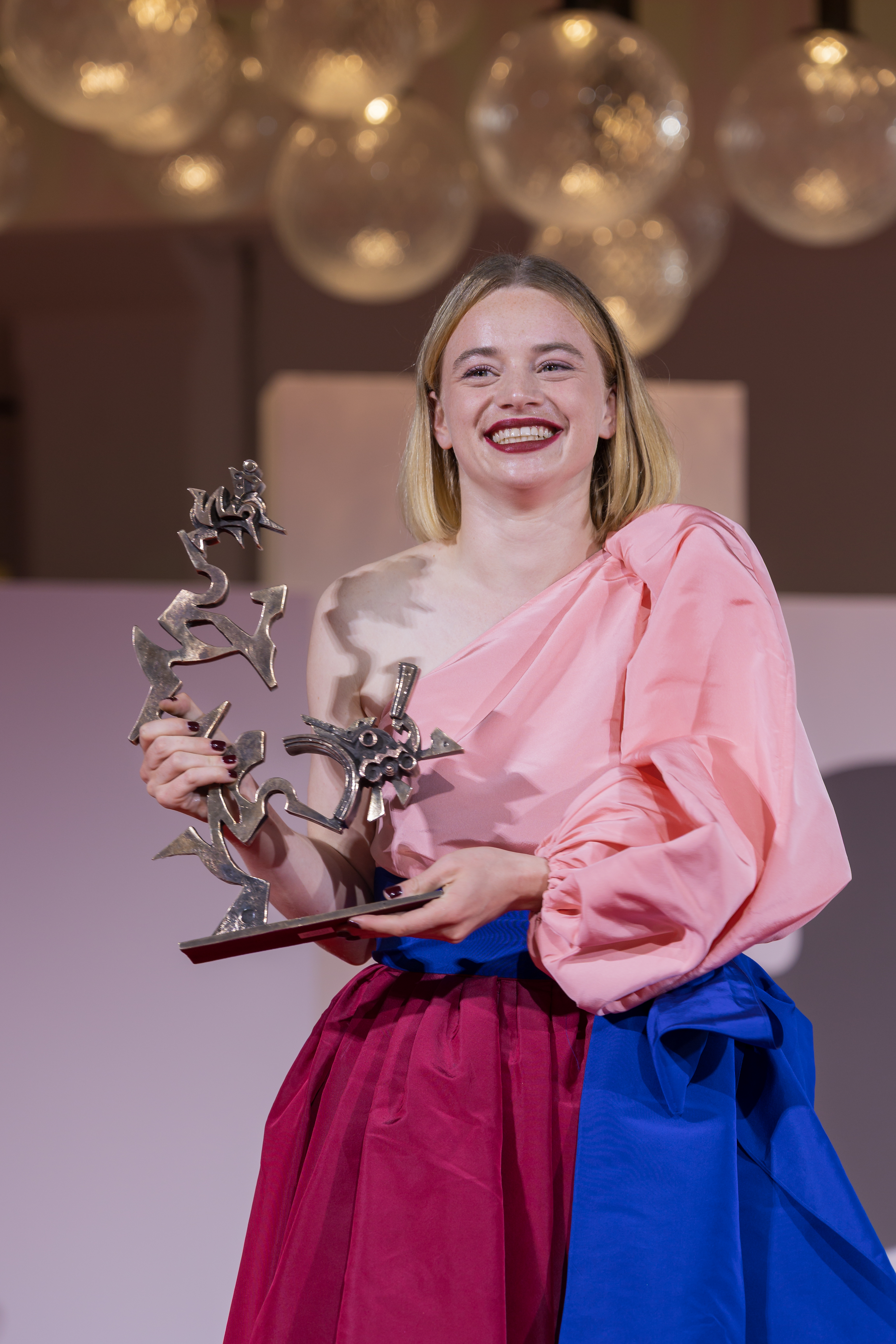
Marcello Mastroianni Award winner: Luna Wedler

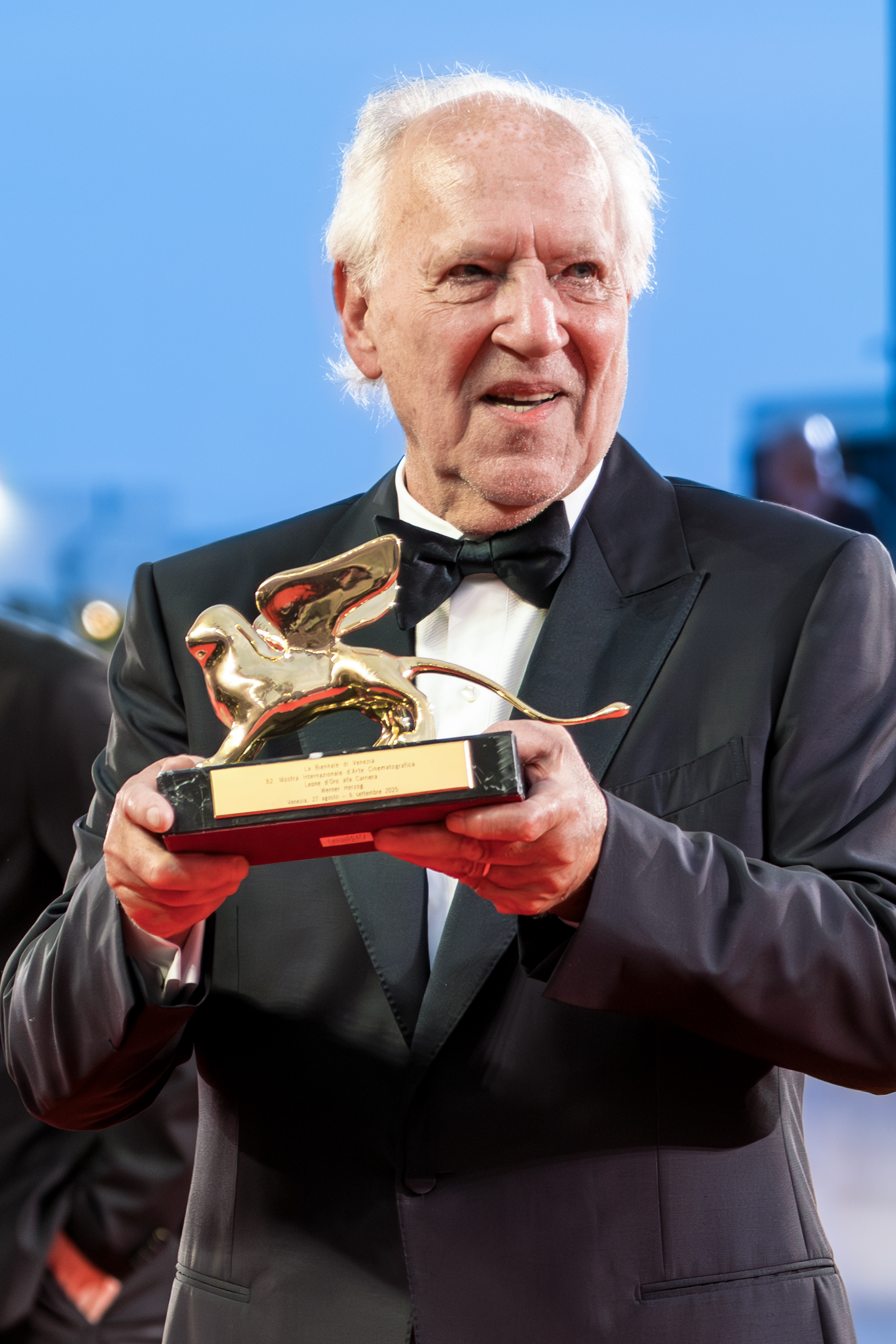
Golden Lion for Lifetime Achievement winner: Werner Herzog

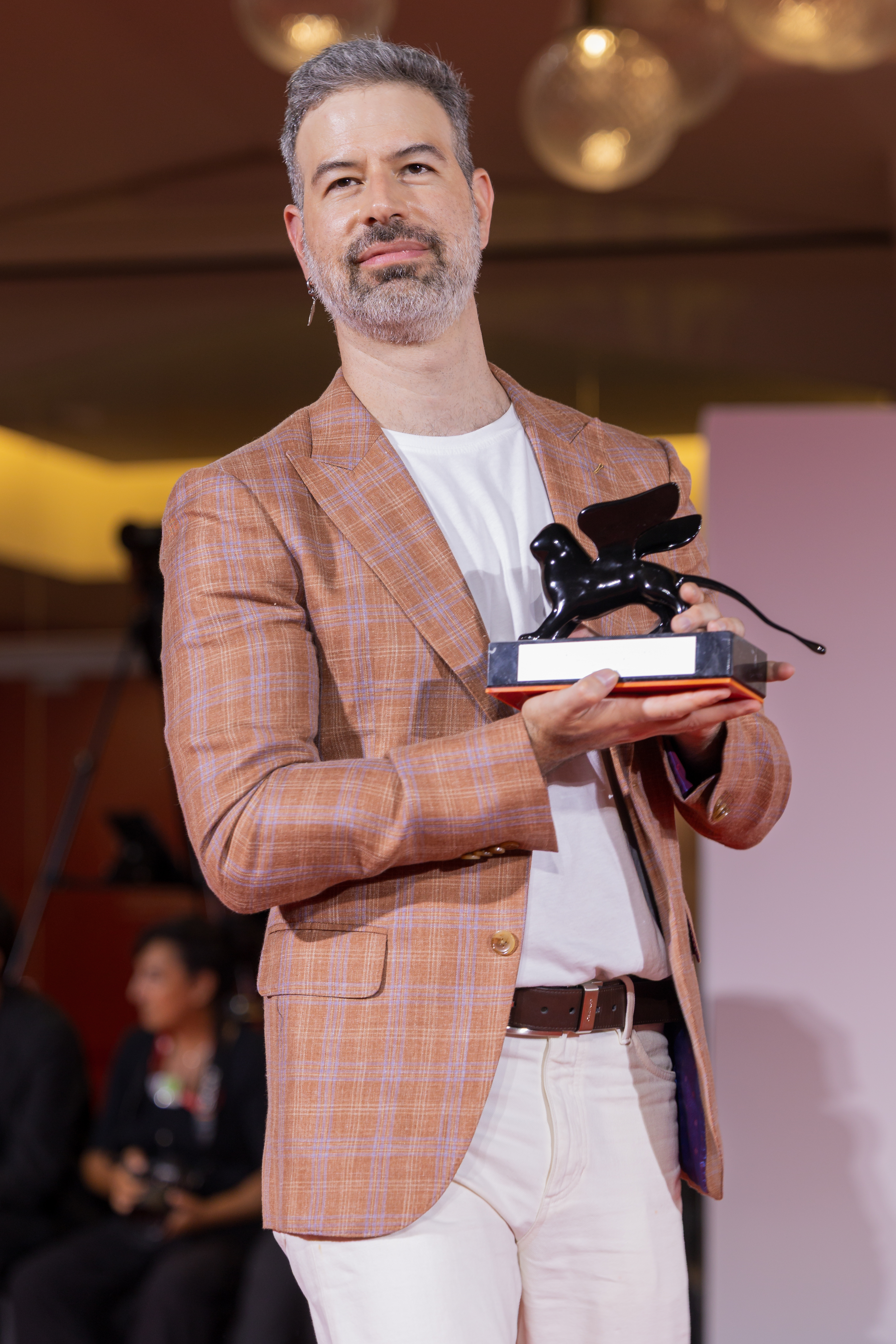
Orizzonti winner: David Pablos

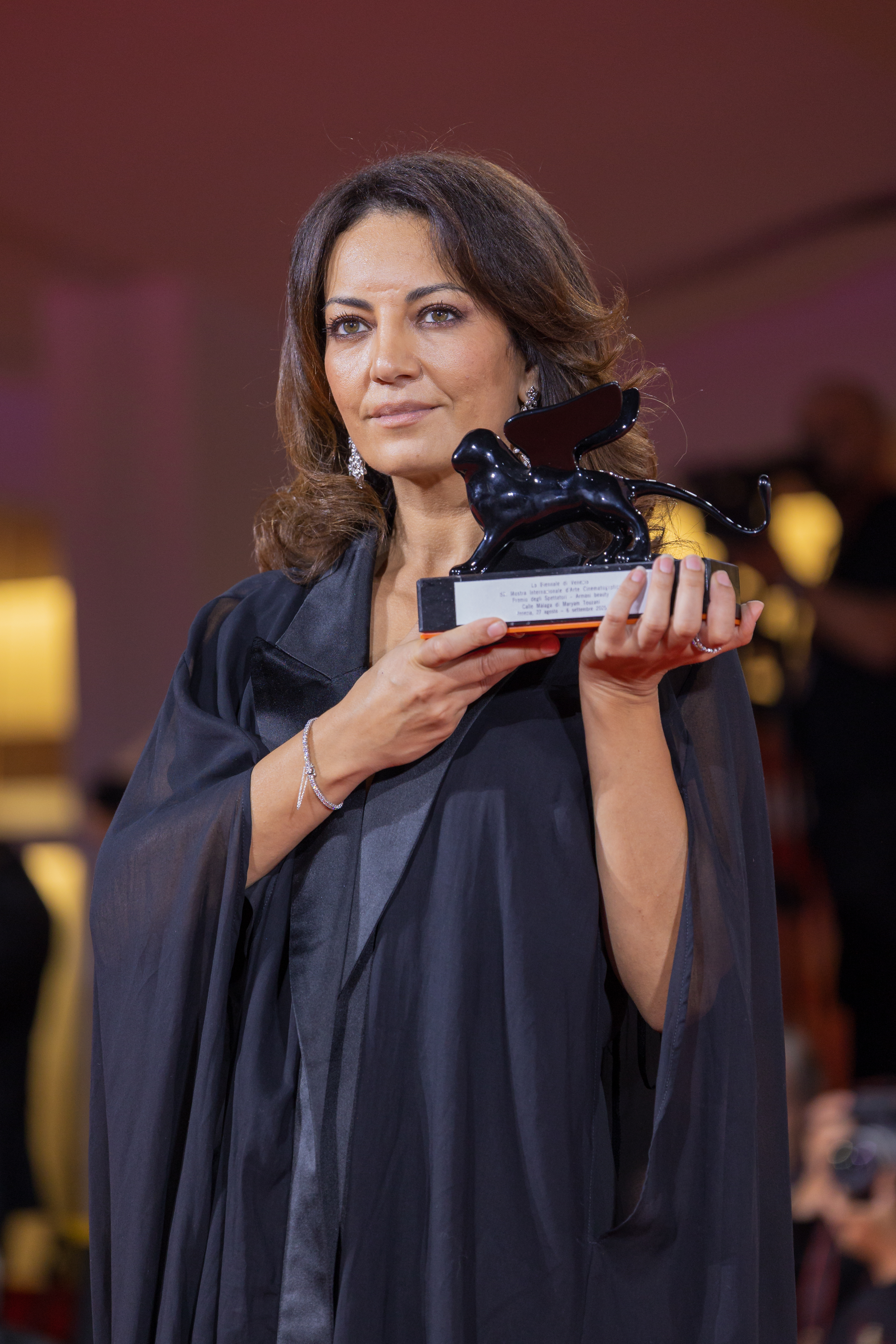
Venice Spotlight Audience Award winner: Maryam Touzani

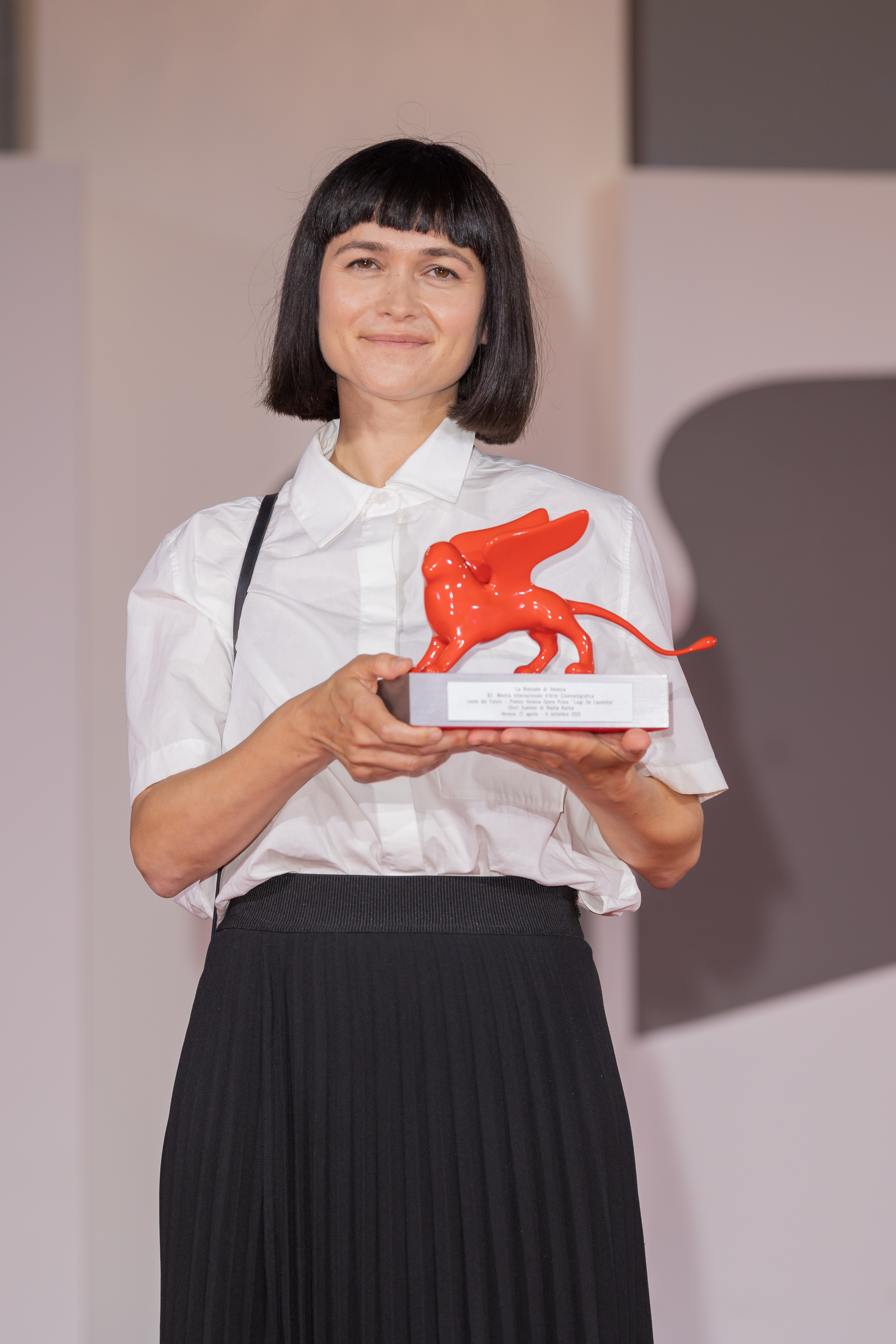
Lion of the Future winner: Nastia Korkia

=== Main Competition (Venezia 82) ===
- Golden Lion: Father Mother Sister Brother by Jim Jarmusch
- Grand Jury Prize: The Voice of Hind Rajab by Kaouther Ben Hania
- Special Jury Prize: Below the Clouds by Gianfranco Rosi
- Silver Lion: Benny Safdie for The Smashing Machine
- Volpi Cup for Best Actress: Xin Zhilei for The Sun Rises on Us All
- Volpi Cup for Best Actor: Toni Servillo for La grazia
- Best Screenplay: Valérie Donzelli and Gilles Marchand for At Work
- Marcello Mastroianni Award: Luna Wedler for Silent Friend

=== Golden Lion for Lifetime Achievement ===
- Werner Herzog
- Kim Novak

=== Orizzonti ===
- Best Film: On the Road by David Pablos
- Best Director: Anuparna Roy for Songs of Forgotten Trees.
- Special Jury Prize: Lost Land by Akio Fujimoto
- Best Actress: Benedetta Porcaroli for The Kidnapping of Arabella
- Best Actor: Giacomo Covi for A Year of School
- Best Screenplay: The Ivy by Ana Cristina Barragán
- Best Short Film: Without Kelly by Lovisa Sirén

=== Venice Spotlight ===
- Audience Award: Calle Málaga by Maryam Touzani

=== Lion of the Future ===
- Luigi De Laurentiis Award for a Debut Film: Short Summer by Nastia Korkia

=== Venice Classics ===
- Best Documentary on Cinema: Mata Hari by Joe Beshenkovsky and James Smith
- Best Restored Film: Bashu, the Little Stranger (1986) by Bahram Beyzai

=== Venice Immersive ===
- Grand Prize: The Clouds are Two Thousand Meters Up by Singing Chen
- Special Jury Prize: Less Than 5GR or Saffron by Négar Motevalymeidanshah
- Achievement Prize: A Long Goodbye by Kate Voet and Victor Maes

=== Glory to the Filmmaker ===
- Julian Schnabel

== Independent Awards ==
=== Venice International Critics' Week ===
- IWONDERFULL Grand Prize: Straight Circle by Oscar Hudson
- People's Choice Award: Ish by Imran Perretta
- Luciano Sovena Award for Best Independent Producer: Agon by Giulio Bertelli
- Mario Serandrei - Hotel Saturnia Award for Best Technical Contribution: Waking Hours by Federico Cammarata and Filippo Foscarini
- Best Short Film: Marina by Paoli de Luca
- Best Director: Nadir Taji for Family Feast
- Best Technical Contribution – Fondazione Fare Cinema: Marina by Paoli de Luca

=== Giornate degli Autori ===
- GdA Director's Award: Inside Amir by Amir Azizi
- Europa Cinemas Label Award: Bearcave by Stergios Dinopoulos and Krysianna B. Papadakis
- People's Award:
  - Memory by Vladlena Sandu
  - A Sad and Beautiful World by Cyril Aris
- SIAE Creative Talent Prize: 6:06 by Tekla Taidelli

=== Queer Lion ===
- On the Road by David Pablos

=== FIPRESCI Awards ===
- Best Film from Venezia 82: Silent Friend by Ildikó Enyedi
- Best Film from Orizzonti and parallel sections: Agon by Giulio Bertelli

=== Golden Globe Impact Prize for Documentary ===
- Remake by Ross McElwee

=== ARCA CinemaGiovani Award ===
- Best Film of Venezia 82: The Voice of Hind Rajab by Kaouther Ben Hania
- Best Italian Film in Venice: La grazia by Paolo Sorrentino

=== Authors Under 40 Award ===
- Best Directing: Laura Samani for A Year of School
- Best Screenplay: Mayra Hermosillo for Vainilla

=== Bisato d'Oro Award ===
- Best Immersive: Reflections of Little Red Dot by Chloé Lee
  - Special Mention:
    - Ancestors by Steye Hallema
    - Constantinopoliad by Sister Sylvester and Nadah El Shazly
    - Less Than 5gr of Saffron by Négar Motevalymeidanshah

=== BookCiak Award ===
- The Stranger by François Ozon

=== Brian Award ===
- La grazia by Paolo Sorrentino

=== Casa Wabi - Mantarraya Award ===
- Inside Amir by Amir Azizi

=== CICT - UNESCO Enrico Fulchignoni Award ===
- The Voice of Hind Rajab by Kaouther Ben Hania

=== Cinema & Arts Award ===
- The Tale of Silyan by Tamara Kotevska
- Who Is Still Alive by Nicolas Wadimoff
  - Special Mention Dedicated to a Multidisciplinary Artist: Morteza Ahmadvand and Firouzeh Khosrovani

=== Premio CinemaSarà ===
- Silent Friend by Ildikó Enyedi

=== Croce Rossa Italiana Award ===
- The Voice of Hind Rajab by Kaouther Ben Hania

=== Edipo Re Award ===
- The Voice of Hind Rajab by Kaouther Ben Hania
- Silent Friend by Ildikó Enyedi
- Ca' Foscari Young Jury Award: Straight Circle by Oscar Hudson

=== Premio Fondazione Fai Persona Lavoro Ambiente ===
- Human Resource by Nawapol Thamrongrattanarit
  - Special Mention:
    - At Work by Valérie Donzelli (treatment of issues related to work)
    - Ghost Elephants by Werner Herzog (treatment of issues related to environment)
    - Below the Clouds by Gianfranco Rosi (treatment of issues related to social environment)

=== Fanheart3 Award ===
- Graffetta d'Oro for Best Film: Frankenstein by Guillermo del Toro
- Nave d'Argento for Best OTP: The character of Scarlet / Hijiri in Scarlet by Mamoru Hosoda
- XR Fan Experience: Happy Shadow by Pei-Ying Lin and Ting-Ruei Su

=== FEDIC Award ===
- Special Mention for Best Film: The Holy Boy by Paolo Strippoli
- Special Mention for Best Short Film: Arca by Lorenzo Quagliozzi

=== Francesco Pasinetti Award ===
- La grazia by Paolo Sorrentino
- Best Actor: Toni Servillo for La grazia
- Best Actress: Valeria Bruni Tedeschi for Duse
  - Special Mention: Anna Ferzetti for La grazia

=== Green Drop Award ===
- Bugonia by Yorgos Lanthimos
- Silent Friend by Ildikó Enyedi

=== ImpACT Award ===
- Remake by Ross McElwee

=== Interfilm Award ===
- Silent Friend by Ildikó Enyedi

=== Lanterna Magica Award ===
- A Year of School by Laura Samani

=== Leoncino d'Oro Award ===
- The Voice of Hind Rajab by Kaouther Ben Hania
- Cinema for UNICEF: Silent Friend by Ildikó Enyedi

=== Lizzani Award ===
- Confession – How I Found Out I Wouldn't Make the Revolution by Bonifacio Angius

=== NETPAC Award ===
- The Ivy by Ana Cristina Barragán

=== NUOVOIMAIE Talent Awards ===
- Best New Young Actors: Giacomo Covi, Pietro Giustolisi and Samuel Volturno for A Year of School

=== La Pellicola d'Oro Award ===
- Best Production Manager: Elda Baldi for La grazia
- Best Prop Maker: Michael Ceracchini for Duse
- Best Chief Electrician: Diana Martia Hernandez Giralo for Elisa

=== Premio Speciale Film Impresa ===
- Ferdinando Scianna - Il Fotografo dell'Ombra by Roberto Andò

=== RB Casting Award ===
- Tiziano Menichelli for My Tennis Maestro

=== SIGNIS Award ===
- Elisa by Leonardo Di Costanzo

=== "Sorriso Diverso Venezia Award" XI Edition ===
- Best Italian Film: Elisa by Leonardo Di Costanzo
- Best Foreign Film: The Voice of Hind Rajab by Kaouther Ben Hania

=== Premio Soundtrack Stars Award ===
- Best Soundtrack: Fabrizio Elvetico, Marco Messina and Sacha Ricci for Duse

=== UNIMED Award ===
- Prize for Cultural Diversity: The Voice of Hind Rajab by Kaouther Ben Hania

=== Campari Passion for Film Award ===
- Gus Van Sant

=== 1964 Pop Art Award ===
- Valeria Bruni Tedeschi
