= Bearcave =

2025 Greek film

- Greek: Αρκουδότρυπα
- Directed by: Stergios Dinopoulos; Krysianna B. Papadakis
- Written by: Stergios Dinopoulos; Krysianna B. Papadakis
- Produced by: Emily Sky Hickin; Stergios Dinopoulos; Krysianna B. Papadakis; Thanasis Michalopoulos; Arsinoi Pilou; Ishan Sanjay Deshpande
- Starring: Chara Kyriazi; Pamela Oikonomaki
- Cinematography: Arsinoi Pilou
- Edited by: Vagelis Katsaros; Krysianna B. Papadakis; Stergios Dinopoulos
- Music by: John Tournas
- Production companies: Pameligo Collective; Pucci Productions
- Release dates: 27 August 2025 (Venice); 21 May 2026 (Greece)
- Running time: 127 minutes
- Countries: Greece; United Kingdom
- Language: Greek

Bearcave (Greek: Αρκουδότρυπα) is a 2025 film written, produced, and directed by Stergios Dinopoulos and Krysianna B. Papadakis in their feature directorial debuts. It is a feature-length adaptation of their 2023 short film of the same name, starring Chara Kyriazi and Pamela Oikonomaki, who reprise their roles from the short film. It is an international co-production of Greece and United Kingdom.

The film had its world premiere at the Giornate degli Autori section of the 82nd Venice Film Festival on 27 August 2025, where it was nominated for Queer Lion. It was released in Greek theatres on 21 May 2026. It received seven nominations at the 2026 Hellenic Film Academy Awards, including Best Film.

== Premise ==
A pregnant woman is challenged by her childhood friend, who secretly has romantic feelings for her, to embark on an adventure in search of the mythical Bear Cave.

== Cast ==
- Chara Kyriazi as Argyro
- Pamela Oikonomaki as Anneta
- Sofia Linospori as Anneta's mother-in-law
- Vaso Gkougkara as Anneta's grandmother
- Lefteris Tsatsis as Argyro's father
- Sozos Christou as Mike

== Production ==
In November 2024, Bearcave participated at the Agora Works in Progress, held during the Thessaloniki Film Festival. The project won the Authorwave Post-Production Award.

== Release ==
Bearcave had its world premiere at the Giornate degli Autori section of the 82nd Venice Film Festival on 27 August 2025. The film was theatrically released in Greek theatres on 21 May 2026. It garnered 4,718 admissions in its first weekend of showing.

== Accolades ==
Film festival or award	Date of ceremony	Category	Recipient(s)	Result	Ref.
Venice Film Festival	5 September 2025	Europa Cinemas Label Award	Stergios Dinopoulos and Krysianna B. Papadakis	Won	
Thessaloniki Film Festival	9 November 2025	Mermaid Award	Stergios Dinopoulos and Krysianna B. Papadakis	Special Mention	
Thessaloniki Film Festival	9 November 2025	FIPRESCI Award for Best Greek Film	Stergios Dinopoulos and Krysianna B. Papadakis	Won	
Thessaloniki Film Festival	9 November 2025	FOS Actress Award	Chara Kyriazi	Won	
Thessaloniki Film Festival	9 November 2025	Hellenic Film and Audiovisual Center – Creative Greece Award	Stergios Dinopoulos and Krysianna B. Papadakis	Won	
Thessaloniki Film Festival	9 November 2025	WIFT GR Award	Stergios Dinopoulos and Krysianna B. Papadakis	Won	
Thessaloniki Film Festival	9 November 2025	Special Youth Jury Award	Stergios Dinopoulos and Krysianna B. Papadakis	Won	
Hellenic Film Academy Awards	17 June 2026	Best Film	Emily Sky Hickin, Stergios Dinopoulos, Krysianna B. Papadakis, Thanasis Michalopoulos, Arsinoi Pilou, and Ishan Sanjay Deshpande	Pending	
Hellenic Film Academy Awards	17 June 2026	Best Director	Stergios Dinopoulos and Krysianna B. Papadakis	Pending	
Hellenic Film Academy Awards	17 June 2026	Best Debut Director	Stergios Dinopoulos and Krysianna B. Papadakis	Pending	
Hellenic Film Academy Awards	17 June 2026	Best Screenplay	Stergios Dinopoulos and Krysianna B. Papadakis	Pending	
Hellenic Film Academy Awards	17 June 2026	Best Actress	Chara Kyriazi	Pending	
Hellenic Film Academy Awards	17 June 2026	Best Cinematography	Arsinoi Pilou	Pending	
Hellenic Film Academy Awards	17 June 2026	Best Original Music	John Tournas	Pending	
