= Mayra Hermosillo =

Mexican actress and filmmaker (born 1987)

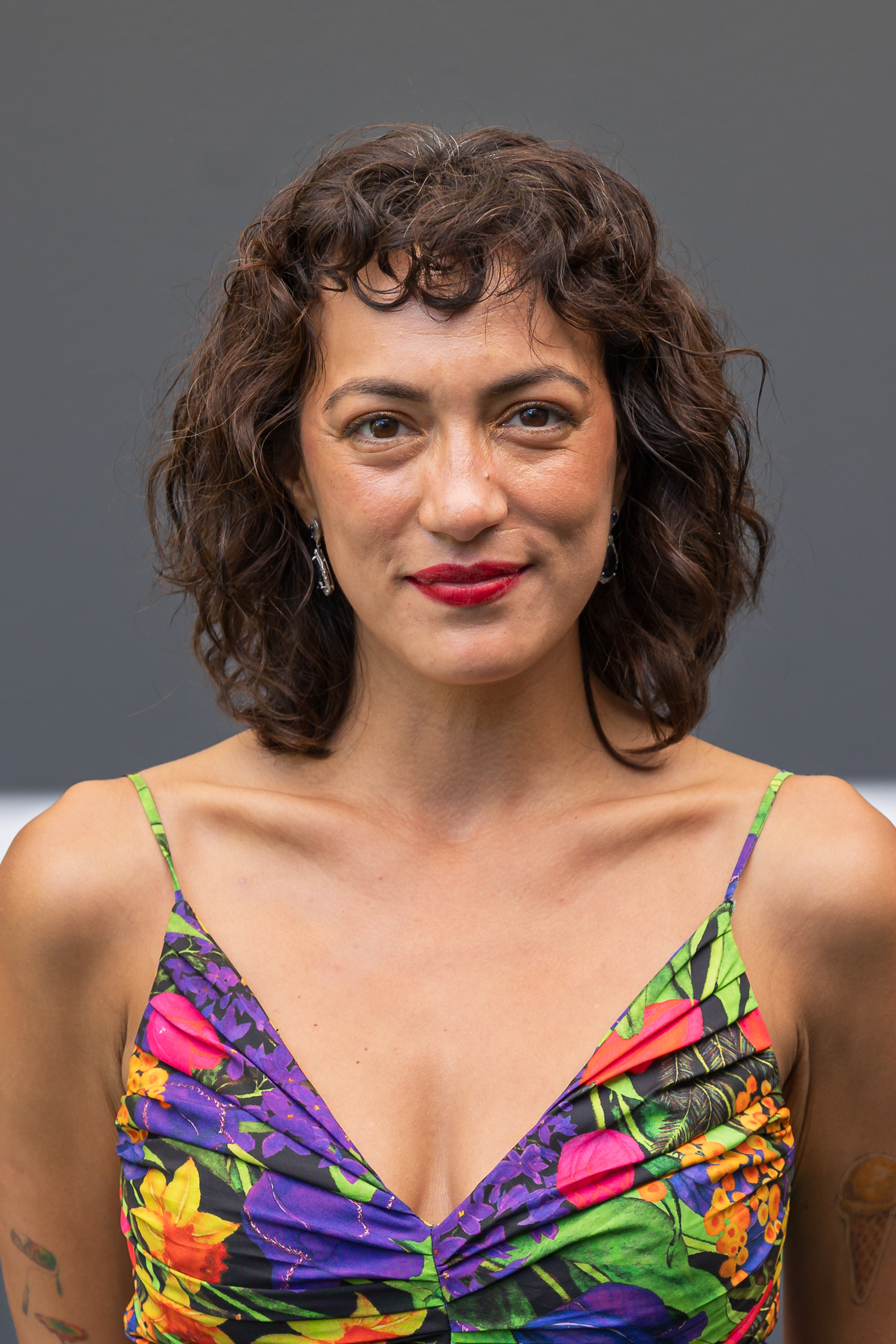
- Hermosillo at the 2025 Venice Film Festival
- Born: 16 December 1987 (age 38); Torreón, Coahuila, Mexico
- Occupations: Screenwriter; Director; Actress

Mayra Hermosillo (born 16 December 1987) is a Mexican actress, film director, screenwriter, and producer.

== Early life and education ==
Born in Torreón, Hermosillo started acting while at high school. She later studied acting at the Monterrey Institute of Technology and Higher Education.

== Career ==
Hermosillo's first job in show business was as a weather presenter for the Multimedios Laguna television channel. After moving to Mexico City, she worked in theater, films, and commercials. After appearing in independent films, she got recognition for her roles in the TV series Falco and Narcos: Mexico.

In 2018, Hermosillo made her directorial and screenwriting debut with the short film En la piel de Lucía, which was screened at the Guadalajara International Film Festival.

In 2025 she made her feature film debut with Vanilla, a film inspired by her own childhood experiences. The film premiered in the Giornate degli Autori section of the 82nd Venice International Film Festival in September 2025, and won the Feature Fiction Award at the Adelaide Film Festival in October of that year.

== Selected filmography ==
=== As actress ===
- Walking Distance (2015)
- Falco (TV, 2018)
- Narcos: Mexico (TV, 2020–2021)
- Northern Skies Over Empty Space (2022)
- ¡Que viva México! (2023)

=== As director and screenwriter ===
- Vanilla (2025)
