= A Year of School =

2025 Italian coming-of-age drama film

- Italian promotional poster
- Italian: Un anno di scuola
- Directed by: Laura Samani
- Written by: Elisa Dondi; Laura Samani
- Based on: One Year of School by Giani Stuparich
- Produced by: Nadia Trevisan; Alberto Fasulo; Thomas Lambert
- Starring: Stella Wendick; Giacomo Covi; Pietro Giustolisi; Samuel Volturno
- Cinematography: Inès Tabarin
- Edited by: Chiara Dainese
- Production companies: Nefertiti Film; Rai Cinema; Tomsa Films; Arte France Cinéma
- Distributed by: Lucky Red
- Release date: 31 August 2025 (Venice)
- Running time: 102 minutes
- Countries: Italy; France
- Languages: Italian; Triestine dialect; English

A Year of School (Italian: Un anno di scuola) is a 2025 coming-of-age drama film directed by Laura Samani, co-written by Samani and Elisa Dondi, and loosely based on the 1929 novella One Year of School by Giani Stuparich. Set in 2007 Trieste, updated from the novella's 1909, the plot follows a Swedish girl who enrolls in an Italian high school and befriends three of her all-male classmates. It draws from Samani's personal experience growing up in Trieste, as well as having read Stuparich's novella while studying at the liceo classico where it is set. It stars newcomers Stella Wendick, Giacomo Covi, Pietro Giustolisi and Samuel Volturno.

The film had its world premiere in the Orizzonti section of the 82nd Venice International Film Festival on 31 August 2025, where Covi won the section's Best Actor prize. It will be released in Italy by Lucky Red.

== Plot ==
In September 2007, Fredrika, a 17-year-old Swedish girl, moves to Italy with her father and enrolls in an all-male technical school in Trieste. She becomes friends with three classmates: sensitive and poetry-reading Antero; the popular yet bereaved ladies' man Pasini; the amiable, father-bear figure Mitis. As each develop romantic feeling for her, tension arise within their friendship. The bright and fun-loving Fredrika effort to fit into the group lead to increasingly difficult choices.

== Cast ==
- Stella Wendick as Fredrika
- Giacomo Covi as Antero
- Pietro Giustolisi as Pasini
- Samuel Volturno as Mitis
- Magnus Krepper as Fredrika Father
- Silvia Gallerano as Professor Banti
- Maurizio Zacchigna as Professor Parmeggiani
- Paolo Fagiolo as Janitor
- Sofia Mercandel as Alice
- Luna Isabel Perosa Perez as Valeria
- Aurora Fabris as Irene
- Stefano Attruia as Professor Chiti
- Giorgia Gregori as Giada
- Paola Bonesi as Nurse
- Cristina Rolli as Birthday Girl
- Students of Class 5ª A as Themselves

== Production ==
Laura Samani first read the novella as student of the Liceo ginnasio statale Dante Alighieri in Trieste, where fellow alumn and Triestine Giani Stuparich had set many of his works, including One Year of School (1929). Samani was also drawn to the story by what she saw as an autobiographical element, having been the only girl in her class to be accepted into an all-male friend group in high school, and having experienced "some weird oppressions" as a result: "of course that was a privilege, but [...] there was sexual tension, as one would expect, between guys and girls. In order to be with them and not to be the girl whose ass is commented [upon], I had to man up [...] shifting my wardrobe towards theirs. I wasn't wearing skirts anymore, for example. I was trying, literally, to fit in".

Giacomo Covi, Pietro Giustolisi and Samuel Volturno were discovered by Samani and acting coach Alejandro Bonn while scouting university parties and "bars and cafes and pubs attended by young adults" in Trieste. Stella Wendick, a film school student, answered a casting call for the film in Stockholm: Samani chose her right away because of her maturity. Wendwick had to learn Italian for the part. Principal photography began in September 2024 in Trieste, concluding by November. Among the locations were the neighbourhood of Barcola and the Istituto tecnico nautico "Tomaso di Savoia, Duca di Genova—Luigi Galvani".

=== Soundtrack ===
The soundtrack is composed of period-accurate songs by indie rock and post punk bands from nearby Pordenone, including Tre Allegri Ragazzi Morti, Mellow Mood and The Great Complotto. The ending is scored to the song "Più niente" (2004) by Prozac+, re-recorded by frontman Gian Maria Accusani with vocals by Elisa. Samani managed to get Accusani to grant them the use of what was a "very personal song to him" by showing him a rough cut of the film. She had been a fan of the band since she was 12 and felt "like [the song] was written for the film".

== Release ==
A Year of School had its premiere in the Orizzonti section of the 82nd Venice International Film Festival on 31 August 2025. It will be released in Italy by Lucky Red.

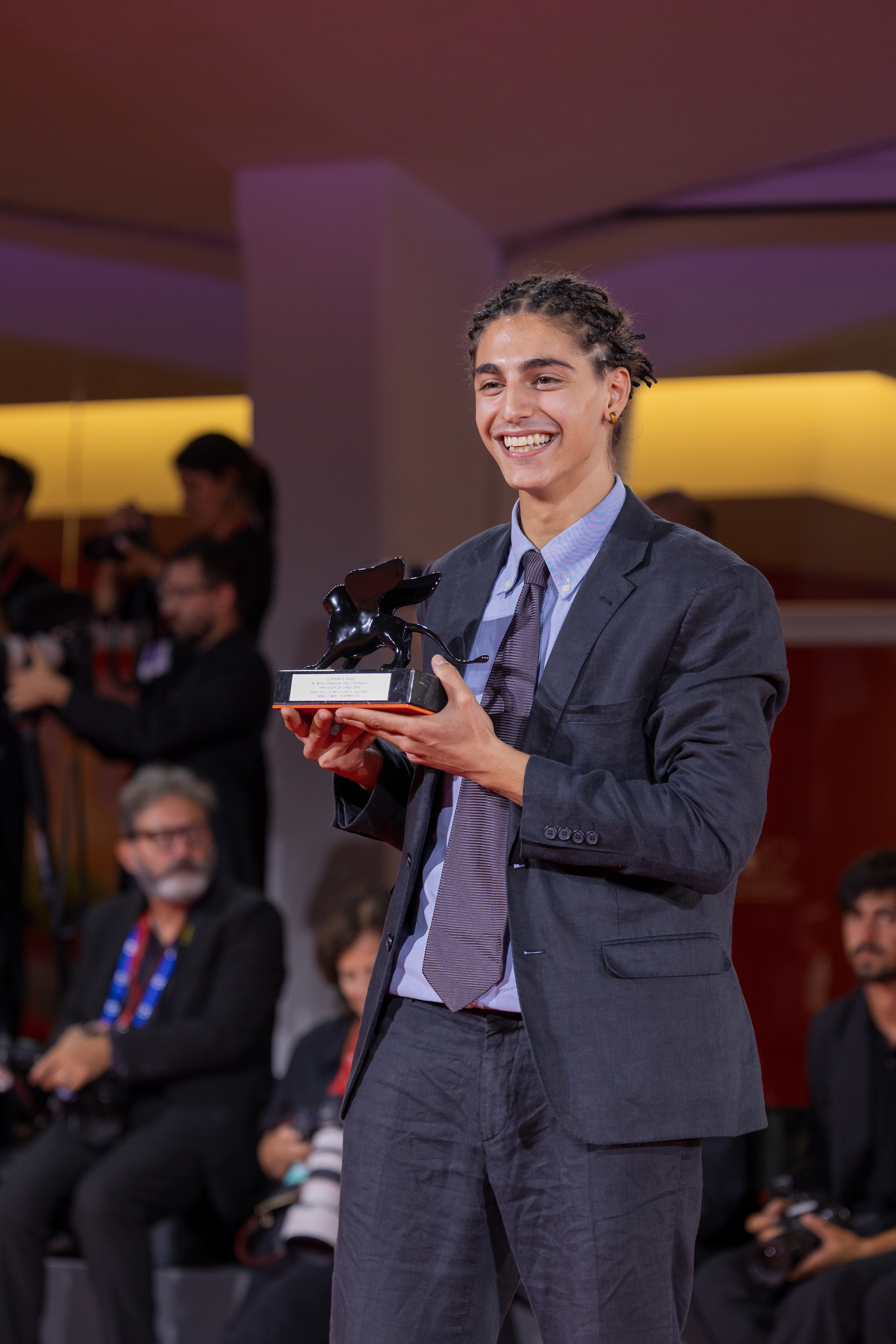
Giacomo Covi, Orizzonti Best Actor winner

== Accolades ==
| Award | Date | Category | Recipient(s) | Result | Ref. |
|---|---|---|---|---|---|
| Venice International Film Festival | September 6, 2025 | Orizzonti Award for Best Film | A Year of School | Nominated | |
| Venice International Film Festival | September 6, 2025 | Orizzonti Award for Best Actor | Giacomo Covi | Won | |
| Venice International Film Festival | September 6, 2025 | Nuovo IMAIE Award for Best New Actor | Giacomo Covi; Pietro Giustolisi; Samuel Volturno | Won | |
| Venice International Film Festival | September 6, 2025 | Valentina Pedicini Award for Best Director Under 40 | Laura Samani | Won | |
| Venice International Film Festival | September 6, 2025 | Magic Lantern Award | A Year of School | Won | |
