= Agon (2025 film) =

2026 sports drama film

- Directed by: Giulio Bertelli
- Written by: Giulio Bertelli
- Starring: Yile Vianello; Alice Bellandi; Sofjia Zobina
- Cinematography: Mauro Chiarello
- Edited by: Tommaso Gallone; Francesco Roma; Giulio Bertelli
- Music by: Tom Wheatley
- Distributed by: Mubi
- Release date: 2025
- Running time: 100 minutes
- Countries: Italy; France; United States

Agon is a 2025 docufiction film written and directed by Giulio Bertelli.

A co-production between Italy, France and the United States, the film premiered at the 40th Settimana Internazionale della Critica, a sidebar of the 82nd Venice International Film Festival. It was awarded Best First Feature Film by FIPRESCI and the Luciano Sovena Award for Best Independent Production.

Agon was distributed by MUBI, released theatrically in Italy on August 29, 2025, and released worldwide on April 24, 2026.

== Plot ==
As the fictional Olympic Games of Ludoj 2024 approaches, Agon shows the stories of three athletes as they prepare and then compete in rifle shooting, fencing and judo.

== Cast ==
- Alice Bellandi
- Yile Yara Vianello
- Sofija Zobina
- Louis Hofmann
- Michela Cescon
- Francesco Acquaroli
- Chiara Caselli

== Reception ==
Jordan Mintzer of The Hollywood Reporter writes that it's "a visually seductive meditation on the many ways in which science — whether biological or technological — now plays a pivotal role in any serious athletic endeavor" and "this fascinating fictional study reveals the extent to which athletes will keep on testing themselves, even if they risk breaking in the process.

Peter Sobczynski of RogerEbert.com gave the film 3.5/4 stars, stating it is "compelling for its depiction of the mechanics of the current athletic scene and the triumphs and tragedies that occur along the way. It may not leave you cheering in the end, but it will give you something to think about the next time the Olympics come around.
