= Vanilla (2025 Mexican film) =

2025 Mexican drama film

- Directed by: Mayra Hermosillo
- Written by: Mayra Hermosillo
- Produced by: Karla Luna Cantu; Stacy Perskie; Paloma Petra; Andrea Porras Madero
- Starring: Aurora Dávila; Natalia Plascencia; María Castellá; Paloma Petra
- Cinematography: Jessica Villamil
- Edited by: Sonia Sánchez Carrasco
- Music by: Yamil Rezc
- Production companies: Redrum; Huasteca
- Release date: 2 September 2025 (Venice)
- Running time: 96 minutes
- Country: Mexico
- Language: Spanish

Vanilla (Spanish: Vainilla) is a 2025 Mexican drama film written and directed by Mexican actress and filmmaker Mayra Hermosillo, in her feature film debut. It premiered at the 82nd Venice International Film Festival, and later won Adelaide Film Festival Feature Fiction Award.

== Synopsis ==
Vanilla is set in Mexico in the late 1980s. The story is seen through the eyes of 8-year-old Roberta, who grows up in an unconventional family household of seven women whose ages span generations: her mother, her grandmother, and her great-grandmother, a cousin, an aunt, and Tachita, a woman who has worked for the family for many years, now considered a family member.

Their home is threatened by mounting debts, and Roberta tries to fix things.

== Cast ==
- Aurora Dávila as Roberta
- Natalia Plascencia as Limbania, Roberta's aunt
- María Castellá as Alicia (Roberta's mother)
- Paloma Petra as Georgina (Roberta's grandmother)
- Fernanda Baca as the cousin
- Rosy Rojas as Roberta's great-grandmother
- Lola Ochoa as Tachita, who has worked with the family for years and considered a member of the family
- Diego Medellin as Arturo
- Daniela Porras as Maestra Pilly

== Production ==
Vanilla is written and directed by Mexican actress Mayra Hermosillo, who starred in the Netflix series Narcos: Mexico and Amat Escalante's Lost in the Night, which premiered at the 2023 Cannes Film Festival. Vanilla is her feature directorial debut; her first short film, En la piel de Lucía was an official selection at the Guadalajara International Film Festival as well as other festivals around the world.

The storyline is based on Hermosillo's own childhood and upbringing. She says that "It's a story about growing up too soon, about how shame and love intertwine, and how identity is formed when you live outside the norm". The title comes from Roberta's favourite flavour of ice cream, vanilla.

The film was selected by the National Fund for Culture and the Arts (FONCA) for development, and received production support from FOCINE (Cinematic Development Company of Colombia) in 2023. It was produced by Stacy Perskie, Karla Luna Cantú, Andrea Porras Madero, and Paloma Petra, through Redrum and Huasteca Casa Cinematografica, and is supported by FOCINE, FONCA, and Guadaljara CTT.

Cinematography was by Jessica Villamil, and Sonia Sánchez Carrasco edited the film. The score was composed by Yamil Misael Rezc Gómez.

Filming was undertaken in the director's hometown in northern Mexico, Torreón.

== Release ==
Vanilla had its world premiere on 3 September 2025 at Sala Perla, as part of the Giornate degli Autori section at the 82nd Venice International Film Festival.

It was selected for screening in competition in the Adelaide Film Festival in October 2025, and screens in the Horizon section of the 36th Singapore International Film Festival on 3 December.

== Reception ==
Matthew Joseph Jenner, reviewing the film at Venice for the International Cinephile Society, gave it 5 out of 5 stars, calling it "A poignant, compelling film that establishes Hermosillo as one of the most exciting new voices in contemporary Mexican cinema. An incredible achievement...".

Diego Lerer, on Micropsia, says "the film never loses the lightness, warmth, and playfulness that define its protagonists", saying that it "recalls certain strains of American indie cinema... [Hermosillo's] vision is generous, warm, and far removed from the severity and cruelty often found in Mexican films that reach the international festival circuit".

== Accolades ==
Vanilla won various industry awards and work-in-progress programmes, including from Ventana Sur.

In October 2025, Vanilla won the Adelaide Film Festival Feature Fiction Award. The jury citation said: "With rare tonal precision, Mayra Hermosillo crafts a narrative that delicately interlaces trauma, identity, and female solidarity with humour, warmth, and pathos. The film finds profound humanity in its flawed, vibrant characters and celebrates difference not as something to be resolved, but embraced. Hermosillo’s direction reveals a filmmaker of remarkable sensitivity and control, blending poetic visuals with emotional truth to create a cinematic world that is at once specific and universally resonant".
