= My Father and Qaddafi =

2025 American-Libyan documentary film

- International promotional poster
- Arabic: بابا و القذافي
- Directed by: Jihan
- Produced by: Jihan K; Dave Guenette; Mohamed Soueid; Sol Guy; Valentina Castellani-Quinn
- Cinematography: Jihan K; Mike McLaughlin; Micah Walker
- Edited by: Alessandro Dordoni; Nicole Halova; Chloe Lambourne
- Music by: Bisan Toron; Didier Monge; Simone Giuliani; Tiago Correia-Paulo
- Release date: 29 August 2025 (Venice)
- Running time: 88 minutes
- Countries: United States; Libya
- Languages: English; Arabic; French

My Father and Qaddafi (Arabic: بابا و القذافي) is a 2025 documentary film produced and directed by Jihan K. It explores the disappearance of Libyan opposition leader Mansour Rashid El-Kikhia in Cairo during 1993, and the impact of that event on his family.

The film had its world premiere out of competition at the 82nd Venice International Film Festival on 29 August 2025, making it the first Libyan title to be featured at the festival in over a decade.

== Synopsis ==
It follows filmmaker Jihan as she investigates the circumstances surrounding the disappearance of her father, Mansour Rashid El-Kikhia, a peaceful opposition figure to Libyan dictator Muammar Qaddafi. El-Kikhia, who had previously served as Libya's foreign minister and Libyan permanent representative to the United Nations, disappeared in Cairo in 1993.

The film interweaves a decades of investigation led by Jihan's mother, Syrian artist Baha Al Omary, with Jihan's own personal journey to reconnect with her father and reconcile her Libyan identity. Born in exile and raised between the United States and France, Jihan was six years old at the time of her father's disappearance.

== Production ==
My Father and Qaddafi is a United States and Libya co-production. Producers include Jihan, Dave Guenette, Mohamed Soueid, Sol Guy and Valentina Castellani-Quinn. It is co-produced by Andreas Rocksén and William Johansson Kalén, of Laika Film & Television AB, with Jayson Jackson and Mohamed Siam serving as consulting producers. It was shot by cinematographers Jihan, Micah Walker and Mike McLaughlin, and edited by Alessandro Dordoni, Chloe Lambourne and Nicole Halova.

Development began after Mansur Rashid Kikhia's remains were identified and buried in 2012, prompting Jihan to undertake the film as a means of preserving her father's memory and her family's connection to Libya amid the country's political collapse.

The project received funding from multiple international organizations, including Quiet, the Doha Film Institute, the Arab Fund for Arts and Culture, the International Documentary Association, CineGouna Funding, International Media Support, the Hot Docs–Blue Ice Docs Fund, Malmö Arab Film Festival, and the Swedish Film Institute. It also participated in several development and post-production programs, including Close Up Lab, DFI Qumra, Durban FilmMart, Between Women Filmmakers Caravan Consultancy, Medimed Euro-Med Doc Market & Pitching Forum, and First Cut Lab.

== Release ==
My Father and Qaddafi had its world premiere Out of Competition at the Venice Film Festival on 29 August 2025. In October 2025, the documentary screened in the International Documentary Competition section at the Chicago International Film Festival. On November, 2025, later screened at the Doha Film Festival, where it won Best Documentary.

On December, 2025, the film screened at the Marrakech International Film Festival, where it was awarded the Jury Prize. It also screened at the Cinemamed – the Brussels Mediterranean Film Festival, where it won Audience Award.

== Reception ==
=== Critical reviews ===
Siddhant Adlakha of Variety described My Father and Qaddafi as an intimate and deeply personal debut, praising its use of home movies and archival material to convey absence, memory, and familial loss. While commending Jihan's willingness to foreground grief and uncertainty, Adlakha noted that the film's extensive historical exposition at times creates emotional distance, occasionally interrupting the potency of its more personal passages.

Nikki Baughan of Screen Daily described My Father and Qaddafi as an "accomplished debut" and a "moving documentary" that combines personal memory with political history. Baughan praised the film's ability to "paint a vivid portrait of Libya itself," highlighting its use of home videos and archival footage to create a "compelling, intimate study of personal and communal grief."

Scott Clark of Gazettely described My Father and Qaddafi as a film that "attempts a delicate balancing act" between personal memoir and political history, framing it as "a tale of absence" that asks whether "a country’s memory can be used to build a person." He noted that while the film's structure is "both its greatest strength and its most significant challenge," it ultimately "succeeds more as a powerful personal testament than as a detached piece of journalism," calling it "a work of filial devotion."

Mina Takla of AwardsWatch described My Father and Qaddafi as "one of the most moving documentaries of the year" and "one of the best Middle Eastern documentaries in quite some time." Takla praised the film's intimate, personal approach, writing that it is "a remarkable testament to cinema’s ability to help us heal," and highlighted how its use of family footage and voiceover creates a powerful portrait of memory, absence, and the long-lasting impact of political violence.

=== Awards ===
Date	Award	Category	Recipient(s)	Result	Ref.
2025	Chicago International Film Festival	International Documentary Competition	My Father and Qaddafi	Nominated	
2025	Doha Film Festival	Best Documentary	My Father and Qaddafi	Won	
2025	Marrakech International Film Festival	Jury Prize	My Father and Qaddafi	Won	
