= Inside Amir =

2025 drama film

- International promotional poster
- Persian: درون امیر
- Directed by: Amir Azizi
- Written by: Amir Azizi
- Produced by: Amir Azizi; Elham Azizi; Ali Azizi
- Starring: Amirhossein Hosseini; Nader Pourmahin
- Cinematography: Ali Ehsani
- Edited by: Amir Azizi
- Music by: Delaram Kamareh
- Production company: Fog Films
- Release date: 2 September 2025 (Venice)
- Running time: 98 minutes
- Country: Iran
- Language: Persian

Inside Amir (Persian: درون امیر, romanized: Daroon-e Amir) is a 2025 Iranian drama film written, produced, edited and directed by Amir Azizi. It follows Amir (Amirhossein Hosseini) on the verge of emigrating from Iran, conflicted between the desire to not abandon his homeland.

The film had its world premiere in the Giornate degli Autori section of the 82nd Venice International Film Festival, where it won Director's Award, the section's main prize.

== Cast ==
- Amirhossein Hosseini as Amir
- Nader Pourmahin as Nader
- Hadis Nazari as Tara
- Nariman Farrokhi as Nariman
- Pirouz Nemati as Pirouz
- Sohrab Mahdavi as Uncle
- Elham Azizi as Mother

== Production ==
The film was produced by Fog Films. It is loosely based on Azizi's personal experiences. The director described it as "a quiet meditation on the emotional distance between staying and leaving – not about what's right or wrong, but what remains unresolved".

== Release ==
The film premiered at the 82nd Venice International Film Festival, in the Giornate degli Autori sidebar, where it won the Director's Award.

== Reception ==
Eye for Film's critic Amber Wilkinson praised the film, describing it as a "sensitive exploration of relationships" and noting "it's easy to undervalue this kind of writing in cinema, since it offers a humanistic exploration of existential themes rather than hinging on dramatic developments".

Marc van de Klashorst from International Cinephile Society referred to the film as a "character study", "a love letter to the city of Tehran and its people", and also "a keen observation on male vulnerability", that "has its own rhythm and more than a tinge of melancholy while being very light on plot".

For this film, Azizi got a nomination for best director at the 18th Asia Pacific Screen Awards.
