= Jean-Loup Passek =

French film critic (1936–2016)

- Born: 29 July 1936; Boulogne-Billancourt, France
- Died: 4 December 2016 (aged 80); Paris, France
- Education: University of Paris
- Occupation: Film critic

Jean-Loup Passek (29 July 1936 – 4 December 2016) was a French film critic. He was the director of cinematic collections at the Centre Georges Pompidou, and the author of several books about cinema.

== Early life ==
Jean-Loup Passek was born on 29 July 1936 in Boulogne-Billancourt near Paris. He was of Slavic descent. He inherited the merry-go-round in the Jardin du Luxembourg.

Passek graduated from the University of Paris, where he earned a bachelor of arts degree in history and geography.

== Career ==
Passek began his career as a poet.

The Centre Pompidou, where Passek worked.

Passek was the editor of all articles on geography in Petit Larousse from 1963 to 1985. Passek authored several books of cinematic criticism, including the Dictionnaire du cinéma published by Éditions Larousse. In 1978, he became the director of cinematic collections at the Centre Georges Pompidou.

Passek worked on the La Rochelle International Film Festival from 1977 onwards. Under his leadership, the film festival focused on comparing films rather than ranking them through competition. A year later, in 1978, he worked on the Cannes Film Festival, where he launched the Caméra d'Or with Gilles Jacob.

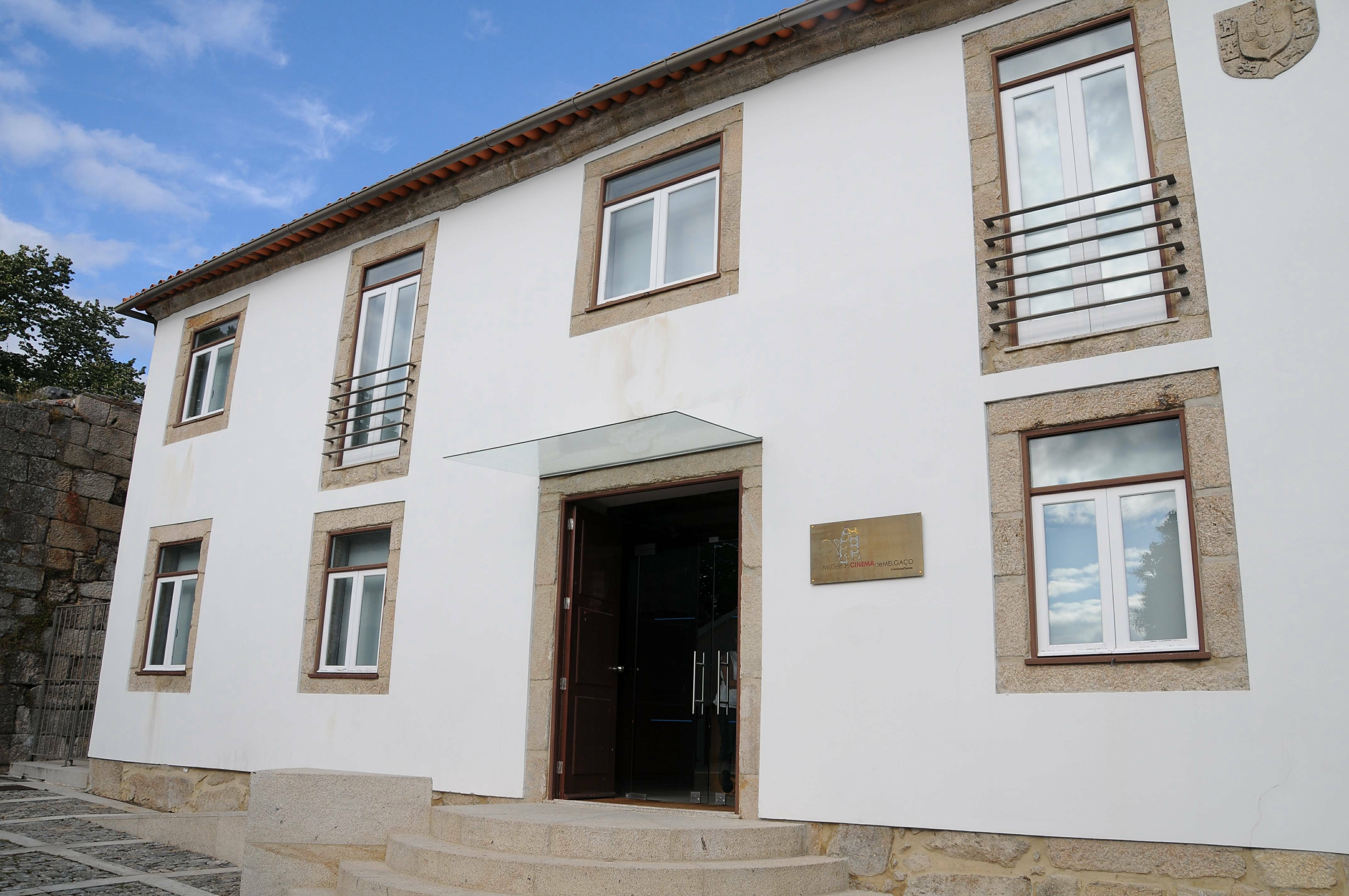
The Museu de Cinema de Melgaço Jean Loup Passek in Portugal.

Passek established the Museu de Cinema de Melgaço Jean Loup Passek in Melgaço, Portugal.

== Death ==
Passek died on 4 December 2016. He was 80 years old.

== Works ==
=== Poetry ===
- Passek, Jean-Loup (1960). Ecoliers buissonniers. Paris: Pierre-Jean Oswald.
- Passek, Jean-Loup (1969). Pouvoir du cri. Paris: Pierre-Jean Oswald. OCLC 2431768.

=== Film criticism ===
- Passek, Jean-Loup (1969). Soixante quinze ans de cinéma. Paris: Fernand Nathan. OCLC 217148629.
- Passek, Jean-Loup, ed. (1978). Vingt ans de cinéma allemand, 1913-1933 : catalogue. Paris: Centre national d'art et de culture Georges Pompidou. ISBN 9782858500789. OCLC 5487789.
- Passek, Jean-Loup, ed. (1979). Joris Ivens : cinquante ans de cinéma. Paris: Centre national d'art et de culture Georges Pompidou. ISBN 9782858500895. OCLC 5946701.
- Passek, Jean-Loup, ed. (1979). Le cinéma danois. Paris: Centre national d'art et de culture Georges Pompidou. ISBN 9782858500130. OCLC 6486767.
- Passek, Jean-Loup, ed. (1981). Le cinéma russe et soviétique. Paris: Centre national d'art et de culture Georges Pompidou. ISBN 9782864250265. OCLC 8765654.
- Passek, Jean-Loup, ed. (1982). Le cinéma portugais. Paris: Centre national d'art et de culture Georges Pompidou. ISBN 9782864250296. OCLC 9280981.
- Passek, Jean-Loup, ed. (1983). Le cinéma indien. Paris: Centre national d'art et de culture Georges Pompidou. ISBN 9782864250371. OCLC 10696565.
- Quiquemelle, Marie-Claire; Passek, Jean-Loup, eds. (1985). Le Cinéma chinois. Paris: Centre national d'art et de culture Georges Pompidou. ISBN 9782858502639. OCLC 11965661.
- Passek, Jean-Loup (1986). Dictionnaire du cinéma. Paris: Larousse. ISBN 9782035123039. OCLC 14214168.
- Passek, Jean-Loup, ed. (1988). D'un cinéma l'autre : notes sur le cinéma français des années cinquante. Paris: Centre Georges Pompidou. ISBN 9782858504459. OCLC 19327256.
- Passek, Jean-Loup; Zaoralová, Eva, eds. (1996). Le cinéma tchèque et slovaque. Paris: Centre national d'art et de culture Georges Pompidou. ISBN 9782858508921. OCLC 415079480.
