= Amir Azizi =

Iranian filmmaker (born 1988)

- امیر عزیزی
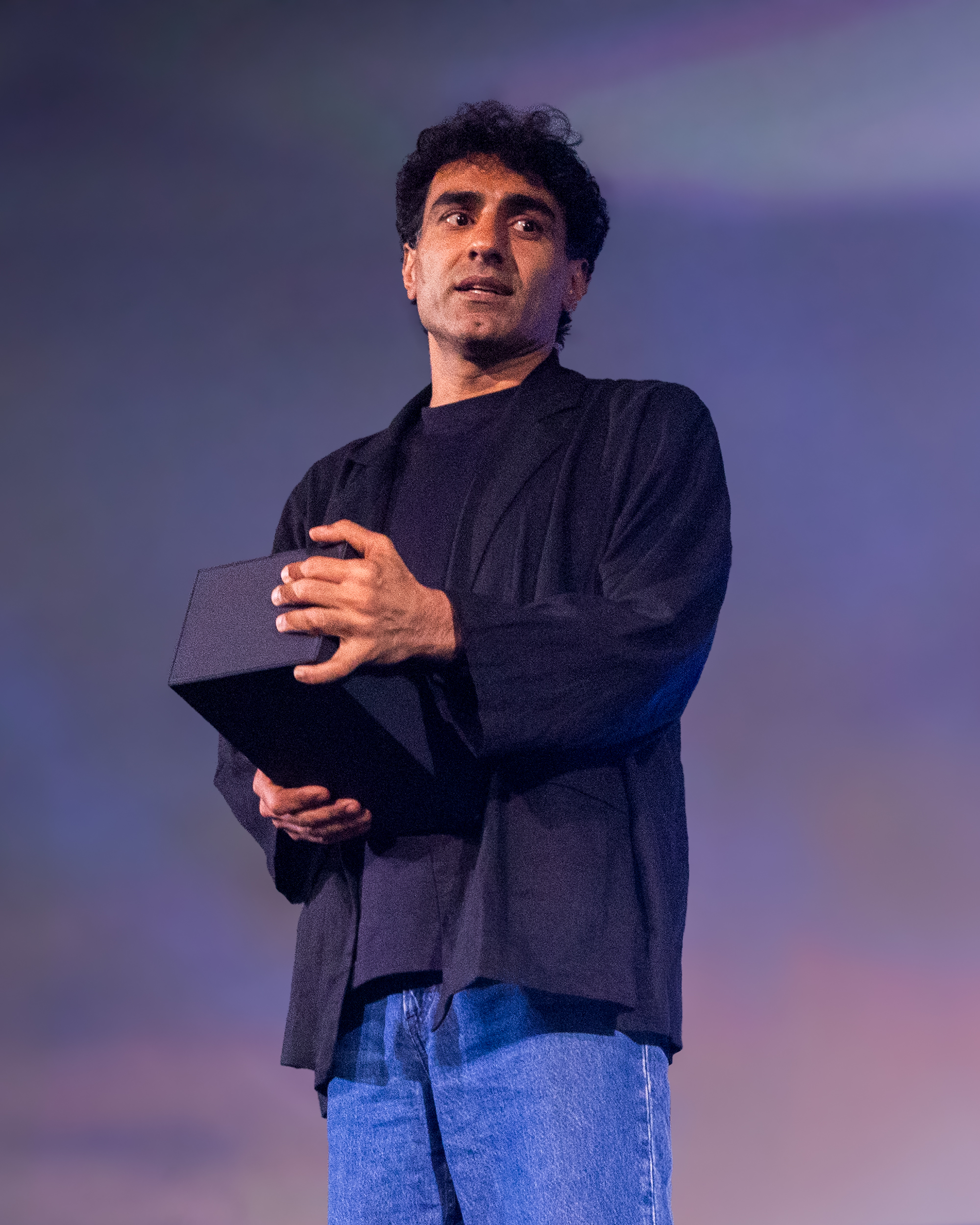
- Azizi at the 2026 Golden Apricot Festival
- Born: 1984 (age 41–42); Ahvaz, Iran
- Occupation: Filmmaker

Amir Azizi (Persian: امیر عزیزی; born in 1984) is an Iranian film director and screenwriter.

== Life and career ==
Born in Ahvaz, Azizi started his career as an assistant director, collaborating among others with Rakhshan Banietemad and Kianoush Ayari.

After directing several shorts and documentaries, he made his feature film debut in 2014, with Temporary. The film was entered into the main competition at the Beijing International Film Festival, and won the Special Jury Prize at the MedFilm Festival. In 2020, he directed Two Dogs, which was screened at the 37th Warsaw Film Festival, and received a special jury mention prize at the 13th Bengaluru International Film Festival.

In 2025, Azizi's third work Inside Amir premiered at the 82nd Venice International Film Festival, in the Giornate degli Autori sidebar, winning the section's main prize, the Director's Award. For this film, Azizi got a nomination for best director at the 18th Asia Pacific Screen Awards.

== Filmography ==
- Temporary (2014)
- Two Dogs (2020)
- Inside Amir (2025)

== Accolades ==
Award	Ceremony date	Category	Work	Result	Ref.
Bengaluru International Film Festival	11 March 2022	Special Jury Mention Prize	Two Dogs	Won	
Venice International Film Festival	6 September 2025	Giornate degli Autori Director's Award	Inside Amir	Won	
Asia Pacific Screen Awards	27 November 2025	Best Director	Inside Amir	Nominated	
