= Small Body =

2021 Italian historical drama film

- Italian theatrical release poster
- Italian: Piccolo corpo
- Directed by: Laura Samani
- Screenplay by: Elisa Dondi; Laura Samani; Marco Borromei
- Story by: Laura Samani
- Produced by: Nadia Trevisan; Alberto Fasulo; Thomas Lambert; Danijel Hočevar
- Starring: Celeste Cescutti; Ondina Quadri
- Cinematography: Mitja Ličen
- Edited by: Chiara Dainese
- Music by: Fredrika Stahl
- Production companies: Nefertiti Film; Rai Cinema; Tomsa Films; Vertigo
- Distributed by: Istituto Luce
- Release dates: 10 July 2021 (Cannes); 19 January 2022 (Slovenia); 10 February 2022 (Italy); 16 February 2022 (France)
- Running time: 89 minutes
- Countries: Italy; France; Slovenia
- Languages: Friulian; Venetian

Small Body (Italian: Piccolo corpo) is a 2021 historical drama film directed by Laura Samani, in her feature film directorial debut, and written by Samani, Elisa Dondi and Marco Borromei from an original story by Samani. Set in rural early-20th century Northeast Italy, it follows a peasant mother (Celeste Cescutti) who travels to a sanctuary in the northern mountains to grant her unbaptised stillborn child access to Heaven, with the help of a rugged, new acquaintance (Ondina Quadri) as guide. An Italian-French-Slovenian co-production of Nefertiti Film, Rai Cinema, Tomsa Films, and Vision, it was shot entirely in Friulian and Venetian language for historical accuracy reasons.

It had its world premiere at the Critics' Week sidebar of the 74th Cannes Film Festival on 10 July 2021, before being released on 19 January 2022 in Slovenia by Vertigo, on 10 February 2022 in Italy by Istituto Luce, and on 16 February 2022 in France by Arizona Distribution. It won various accolades, including a David di Donatello for Best New Director and the European Film Award for the Discovery of the Year.

== Plot ==
Agata's baby is stillborn. According to Catholic tradition, its soul is condemned to Limbo. When she hears of a church whose priest has the supernatural power to bring a dead child back to life she ventures on a journey with the child in a coffin on her back.

== Cast ==
- Celeste Cescutti as Agata
- Ondina Quadri as Lynx (Italian: Lince)
- Marco Geromin as Ingac the Wise
- Giacomina Dereani as Lia the Bandit
- Anna Pia Bernardis as Hermit
- Angelo Mattiussi as Cart Worker
- Luca Sera as Island Priest
- Teresa Cappellari as Marla the Healer
- Marzia Corinna Mainardis as Corinna the Healer
- Marisa Rupil as Vanda the Healer
- Ivo Ban as Miner Leader
- Denis Corbatto as Agata's Husband
- Giovanna Cescutti as Agata's Mother
- Cristina Chizzola as Lynx's Mother
- Claudia Lodolo as Factory Worker
- Lucia Castellano as Assunta
- Ilaria Emiliani as Midwife
- Alessandro Barbacetto as Cocias the Bandit Leader
- Nilla Patrizio as Rite Woman
- Emanuela Cicigoi as Miner
- Matilda Peruch as Agata's Sister
- Federica Muliner as Perpetua
- Lisetta Totis as Assistant Midwife
- Marco Nogarotto as Caronte the Boatman

== Reception ==
Small Body has an approval rating of 100% on review aggregator website Rotten Tomatoes, based on 17 reviews, and an average rating of 7.7/10. Metacritic assigned the film a weighted average score of 77 out of 100, based on 6 critics, indicating "generally favorable reviews".

== Awards ==
- David di Donatello Awards

2022 Winner David Best New Director (Migliore Regista Esordiente)

2022 Nominee David Best Song (Migliore Canzone)

- Cannes Film Festival

2021 Nominee Grand Prix de la Semain de la Critique

2021 Nominee Caméra d'or

- Premio Flaiano

2022 - Winner best first feature to Laura Samani

- Bobbio Film Festival

Winner best first feature to Laura Samani

- Premio "Beppe Ciavatta" - Winner Best New Director Laura Samani
- Premio Suso Cecchi d'Amico - Best script (2022)
- European Film Awards

2022 Winner European Film Award, European Discovery - Prix Fipresci

- Italian National Syndicate of Film Journalists

2022 Nominee Best New Director (Migliore Regista Esordiente)

- London Film Festival

2021 Nominee Sutherland Award First Feature Competition

2021 Winner Sutherland Award - Honourable Mention

- Molodist Kyiv International Film Festival

2022 Nominee International Competition: Full-Length Films

2022 Winner Special Jury Diploma International Competition: Full-Length Films

- Palm Springs International Film Festival

2022 Nominee New Voices/New Visions Grand Jury Prize

- Slovene Film Festival

2021 Winner Vesna Best Minority Coproductions

2021 Winner Vesna Best Cinematography (Mitja Licen)

- Stockholm Film Festival

2021 Nominee Bronze Horse Best Film

- Trieste Film Festival

2023 Winner SNCCI Award Best Italian Film

- Annecy Italian Cinema Festival

2021 Winner Audience Award International Competition

- Dublin International Film Festival

2022 Winner Dublin Film Critics Award - Best Director

- Golden Globes, Italy

2022 Winner Golden Globe Best First Feature (Migliore Opera Prima)

- Minneapolis St. Paul International Film Festival

2022 Winner Emerging Filmmaker Award

- Dublin Film Critics Circle Awards

2022 Nominee Best Cinematography (Mitja Licen)

10th place

- Golden Ciak Awards

2022 Nominee Golden Ciak Best First Feature (Migliore Opera Prima)

- Seville European Film Festival

2021 Winner Audience Award - Historias Extraordinarias

- Chéries-Chéris

2021 Winner Acting Prize Best Actor (Celeste Cescutti, Ondina Quadri)

2021 Nominee Grand Prize Chéries-Chéris Feature Film

- Bellaria Film Festival (BFF)

2022 Nominee Casa Rossa Best Film (Miglior Film)
