= Laura Samani =

Italian filmmaker (born 1989)

- Born: 9 October 1989 (age 36); Trieste, Italy
- Occupation: Film director

Laura Samani (born 9 October 1989) is an Italian film director and screenwriter.

== Life and career ==
Born in Trieste, Samani graduated from the University of Pisa in Performing Arts and Communication Disciplines. She later enrolled at the Centro Sperimentale di Cinematografia, and her graduation short film The Sleeping Saint premiered at the 2016 Cannes Film Festival in the Cinéfondation sidebar. It won the Best Short Film Award at the Lisbon & Estoril Film Festival.

In 2021, Samani made her directorial feature debut with Small Body, which premiered at the 74th Cannes Film Festival, in the Critics' Week section. The film got her the David di Donatello for Best Directorial Debut and the European Film Award for European Discovery of the Year. Her following film, A Year of School, is loosely based on the 1929 novella of the same name by Giani Stuparich. It premiered at the 82nd Venice International Film Festival, in the Orizzonti sidebar.

== Filmography ==
- The Sleeping Saint (short, 2016)
- Small Body (2021)
- A Year of School (2025)
