= Prozac+ =

Italian band

Prozac +
- Origin: Italy
- Genre: Pop punk
- Years active: 1995–2007; 2018
- Labels: Emi, VoxPop
- Members: Gianmaria Accusani (1995–present); Elisabetta Imelio (1995–2020); Eva Poles (1995–present)

Prozac+ were an Italian punk band, founded in Pordenone in 1995. As with the Canadian band Prozzäk, they are named for the brand name of the antidepressant fluoxetine by Eli Lilly and Company.

== History ==
The band's three founding members are Gian Maria "GM" Accusani (guitarist and singer), Eva Poles (singer), and Elisabetta Imelio (bassist). Imelio died of breast cancer on March 1, 2020.

Their second album, Acido Acida, released by EMI, sold 175,000 copies and hit platinum charts. Album's track Acida became the most important Summer hit of 1998, a record for the punk rock genre.

== Discography ==
- Testa plastica (1996)
- Baby EP (1997)
- Acido Acida (1998)
- 3Prozac+ (2000)
- 3Prozac+ English Version (2000)
- Miodio (2002)
- Gioia nera (2004)
