= Melgaço Museum of Cinema =

Museum in Alto Minho, Portugal

- Museu de Cinema de Melgaço
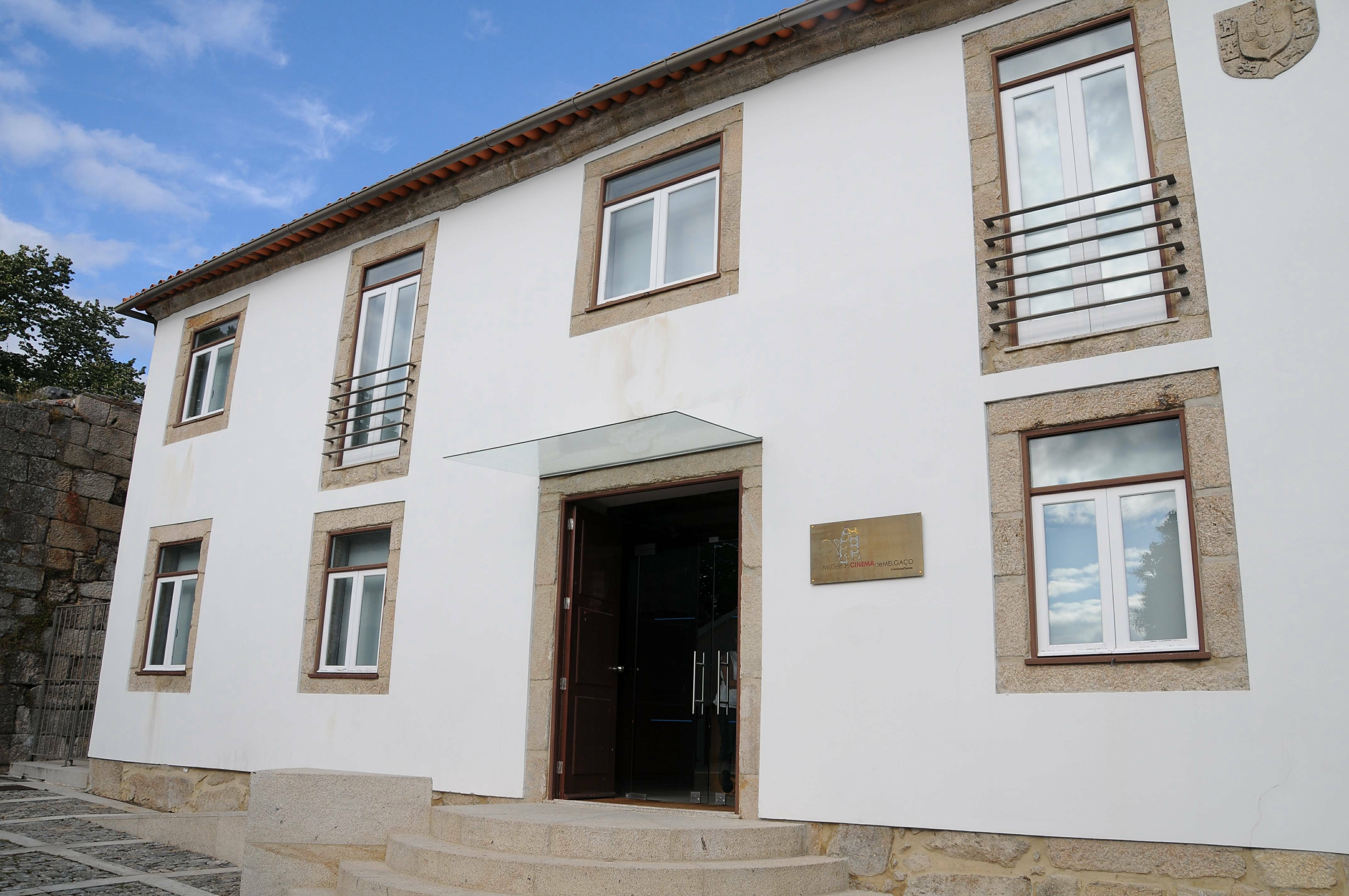
- The simple front facade of the fiscal guard output, and modern museum of cinema
- Interactive map of the Melgaço Museum of Cinema area

General information
- Location: Vila e Roussas, Melgaço, Portugal
- Coordinates: 42°6′52.5″N 8°15′36″W
- Owner: Portuguese Republic

Technical details
- Material: Granite

The Melgaço Museum of Cinema is a museum located in Melgaço. Since 2005, it has been housed in a 19th-century building previously housed in the local customs authority.

== History ==
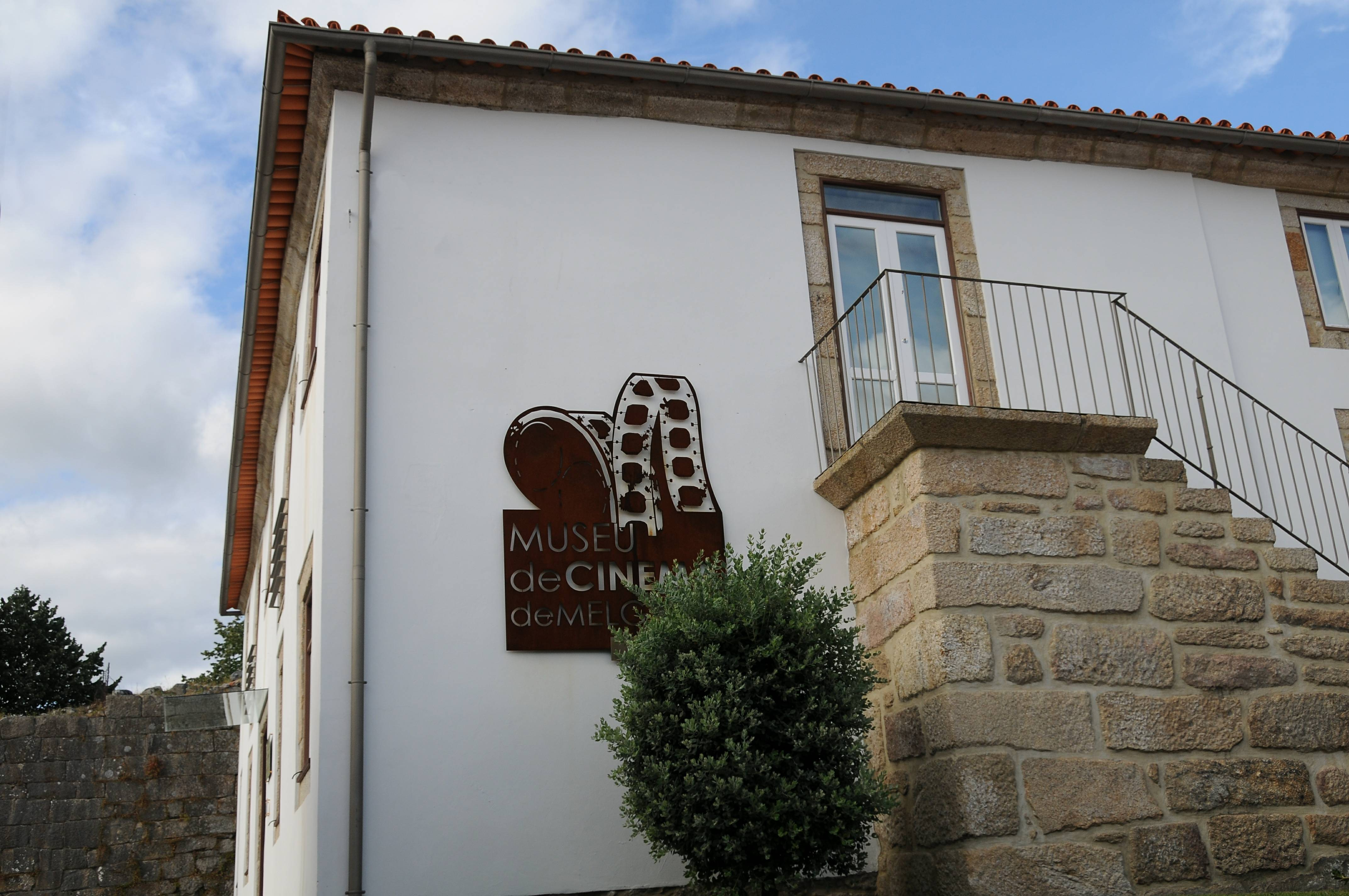
The staircase and access to the cinema museum

Beginning in 1955, the DGEMN Direção-Geral de Edificios e Monumentos Nacionais (Directorate-General for Buildings and National Monuments) began work to conserve and rehabilitate the building, along with the Delegação nas Obras de Edifícios de Cadeias das Guardas Republicana e Fiscal e das Alfândegas (Republican Guard Delegation for Jailhouses, Fiscal Guards and Customshouses). This included the substitution of the ceiling and pavement, in addition to repair to the spaces within the building in 1956. In addition the pantry, small refectory and hall was also improved by the delegation.

On 3 June 2005, the building was reopened and inaugurated as the cinema museum of Melgaço. Its collection comprises machines and objects from pre-cinema era, original posters in canvas, photographs and diverse documents related to cinema in Portugal. The main exhibition identifies the evolution of cinema, with a major part of the collection contributed by film critic Jean-Loup Passek.

== Architecture ==
The building is located in the historic centre, with its rear facade addorsed to one of the fortification walls of the old castle, and the lateral left wall part of the urban circus. A corner of the structure consists of a platform adapted to the terrain and slope, with the principal facade consisting of pavement stone and granite cornerstones, forming a square block in front of the roadway. The portico is preceded by a semi-circular staircase.

The rectangular building is covered in tile, and the facades plastered and painted in white, encircled by embrasure, terminated in cornices and simple frames.
