= Giulio Bertelli =

Bertelli in 2026.

Giulio Bertelli (born 5 May 1990) is an Italian sailor and film director.

== Career ==
Bertelli was born in Milan in 1990 and is the child of billionaire fashion industry couple Miuccia Prada and Patrizio Bertelli. He studied architecture at the Architectural Association in London and became a professional offshore sailor in 2012.

He has been associated with sailing teams including Luna Rossa, AkzoNobel Ocean Racing and Team Biotherm Racing.

In 2025, Bertelli made his feature directorial debut with Agon. The film premiered in competition at the 40th International Critics' Week, an independent and parallel section of the 82nd Venice International Film Festival.

Agon received the FIPRESCI Prize for Best Film from Orizzonti and parallel sections and the Luciano Sovena Award.

In 2026, Agon was selected for New Directors/New Films, presented by The Museum of Modern Art and Film at Lincoln Center.

== Awards and honours ==
- FIPRESCI Prize for Best Film from Orizzonti and parallel sections, for Agon (2025).
- Luciano Sovena Award, for Agon (2025).
- CONI Gold Medal for Athletic Valor, as part of Luna Rossa Prada Pirelli (2023).
