= Giornate degli Autori =

Section of Venice film festival

The Giornate degli Autori (Italian: [dʒorˈnaːte deʎʎ auˈtoːri]; lit. 'Authors' Days') or simply the Giornate, formerly known in English as Venice Days, is an independent parallel section of the Venice Film Festival. Founded in 2004 by Giorgio Gosetti, the section is focused in independent works by less known filmmakers.

The list of notorious filmmakers who have been part of section includes: Denis Villeneuve, Sarah Polley, Steve Buscemi, Hubert Sauper, Xavier Beauvois, Emmanuel Mouret, Andrea Segre, Jean-Marc Vallée, Ramin Bahrani, Uberto Pasolini, Edoardo De Angelis, Hiam Abbass, Ava DuVernay, Leyla Bouzid, Celia Rowlson-Hall, Dag Johan Haugerud, and Josh and Benny Safdie.

The program usually includes 11 competition films and the closing-night film which all, in addition to special screenings and additional events, are screened at Venice Film Festival theaters and venues.

The section official main award, the GdA Director's Award, is regularly given by an independent jury during the closing night ceremony.

== History ==
The Giornate's goal, similarly to that of the Directors' Fortnight at the Cannes Film Festival, is to balance the star studded main event more sensational approach with drawing attention to high quality authors' cinema, specifically the one that represents innovative, original and independent take on moviemaking. With Villa Degli Autori as its center hub and headquarters during the event the Giornate's ambition is also to create an "informal and free space for authors, producers, distributors and journalists to meet and discuss their ideas".

The Giornate started in 2004 with three months to organize and, as director and founder Giorgio Gosetti put it, one common goal: "to go well beyond the simple showcase of films in the official selection and offer a bright window to the work of directors".

The president of the Giornate is Andrea Purgatori. Honorary President is Roberto Barzanti. Anac and 100autori organize and promote the section activities.

== GdA Director's Award winners ==
Year	English title	Original title	Director(s)	Production country
2013	Kill Your Darlings		John Krokidas	United States
2014	Return to Ithaca	Retour à Ithaque	Laurent Cantet	France
2015	Early Winter		Michael Rowe	Australia, Canada
2016	The War Show		Andreas Dalsgaard and Obadiah Zytoon	Syria, Denmark, Germany
2017	Candelaria		Jhonny Hendrix Hinestroza	Colombia, Germany, Norway, Argentina, Cuba
2018	Real Love	C'est ça l'amour	Claire Burger	France
2019	La Llorona		Jayro Bustamante	Guatemala, France
2020	The Whaler Boy	Kitoboy	Philipp Yuryev	Russia
2021	Immaculate	Imaculat	Monica Stan and George Chiper-Lillemark	Romania
2022	Wolf and Dog	Lobo e Cão	Cláudia Varejão	Portugal, France
2023	Humanist Vampire Seeking Consenting Suicidal Person	Vampire humaniste cherche suicidaire consentant	Ariane Louis-Seize	Québec, Canada
2024	Manas		Marianna Brennand	Brazil, Portugal, Belgium
2025	Inside Amir	درون امیر	Amir Azizi	Iran
2026	Sometimes Sadness, Sometimes Rebellion	A veces me entra tristeza, otras veces rebelión	María Aparicio	Argentina, Spain

== Independent Awards ==
- BNL People's Choice Award for the Official Selection's films
- Label Europa Cinemas
- “Luigi De Laurentiis” Venice Award (‘Lion of the Future’) for a Debut Film
