= Cinema of Qatar =

Cinema in Qatar is a relatively young industry that evolved as part of the country’s plans to develop different local sectors with the aim of accumulating international recognition and status. Many major steps were taken to implement a long-term plan to develop the infrastructure as well as giving opportunities to local talents to have a platform that establishes their presence within the film industry with the support of the Doha Film Institute, and their various grants, workshops and festivals. The Qatar National Vision 2030 has three major pillars to development: human, social economic and environmental; this vision provides frameworks that enable the development of different elements within Qatar and its society; one of which is the high importance put on developing and cultivating artistic talents to represent and define Qatar on a global scale. Another important element in developing the movie industry is the influence and vision of Sheikha Al Mayassa who founded Doha Film Institution; the establishment of film as a mode of storytelling was imperative because it serves the purpose of granting Qatar a global presence through the talents that are supported and cultivated because of her initiative. The film industry plays a role in amplifying the Qatari national identity alongside the identity of the Arab world as a whole.

Another important entity in cultivating and establishing the film industry in Qatar is the Culture, Arts and Heritage initiative under Qatar’s Ministry of Foreign Affairs which has a strategy that aims to organize and encourage events that focus on providing a foundation for the youth of Qatar to utilize in improving their positioning within the culture. The ministry organizes events that revolve around advancing local talents; events such as lecture, as well as theatrical and musical troupes as well as providing access and grants to locals interested in pursuing a career in film.

== History ==
Film screenings first began in Qatar in the 1950s. During the 1960s, films gained broader distribution, with movies being shown at auto shops across the capital Doha. Distributors from around the globe, equipped with films and projectors, traveled to the country and created makeshift cinemas wherever feasible.

Over time, cinemas started to open in recreational and sports clubs, leading to the establishment of official film theatres. In 1970, the Qatar Cinema & Film Distribution Company (QCFDC) was founded, inaugurating Gulf Cinema in 1972 as the country's first cinema. Gulf Cinema featured a seating capacity of 1,000 spectators and was even expanded with an extra 400 seats during its peak. It would later be closed in 2013 to make space for the Doha Metro. The QCFDC was also responsible for opening the country's second cinema, Doha Cinema.

In the 1980s, Qatar's cinemas struggled compared to years prior due to the rise of VHS tapes, which made films more easily accessible at home. The situation improved in the 1990s when cinemas started screening new releases from the global market, including popular Bollywood and Western movies. During periods when films were not being shown, plays were presented instead, ensuring a steady supply of customers to Qatar's cinemas.

== The Doha Film Institute ==
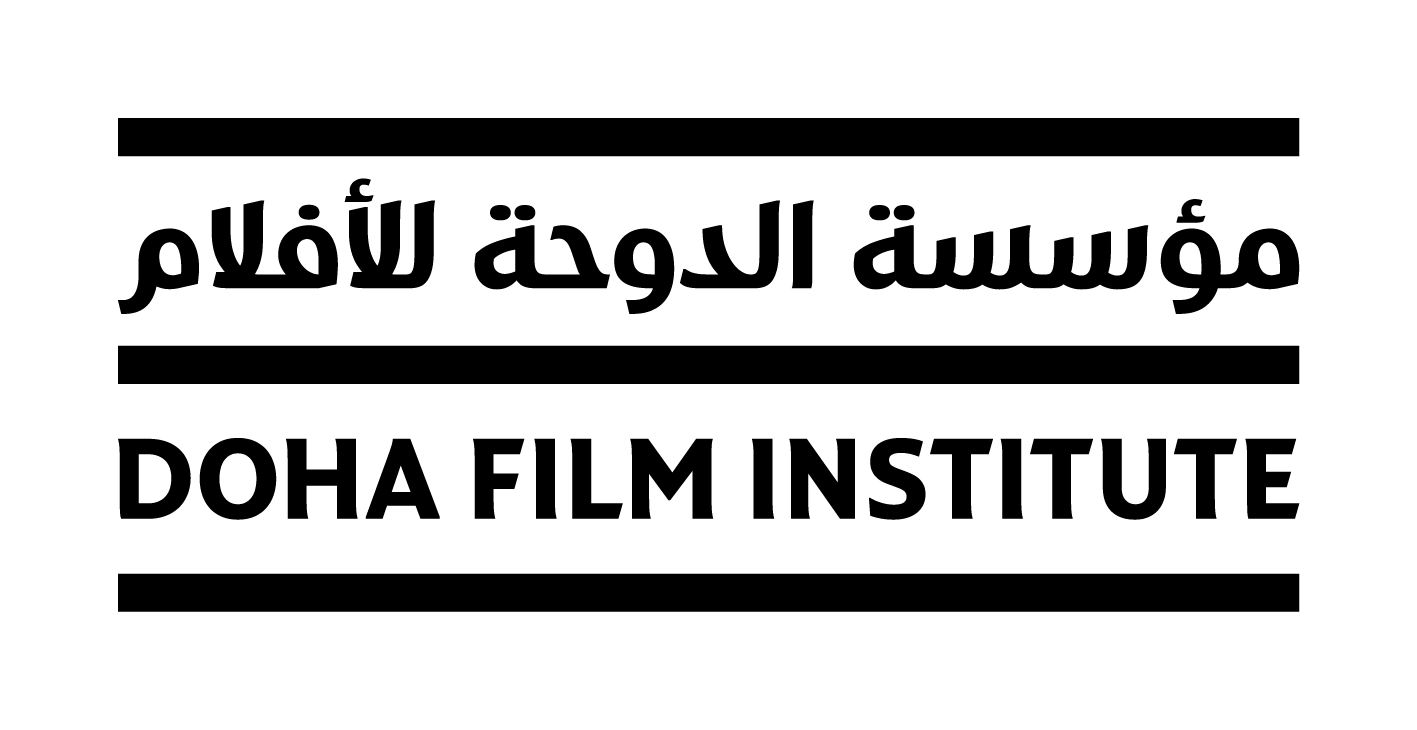
Doha Film Institute Logo

The Doha Film Institute (DFI) is an independent production house that was founded in 2010 by her highness Sheikha Al-Mayassa bint Hamad bin Khalifa Al-Thani. The company aims to contribute to the growth of the local film community in Qatar, and provides funding and production services for shorts and features of local, international, and regional films. Along with funding, the DFI aids the grantees with their pre-production, production, and post-production processes as well as mentors and educates filmmakers in and out of Qatar with the development of their films.

In addition to providing educational programs, workshops and information sessions, the institute is plannings to host more than 100 experts in the film industry to mentor Qumra projects. It also invests in film production by partnering with film projects and co-financing them, and its productions include a 3D animated film, a Grand Prix awarded film and a Museum of Modern Art exhibited film.

== Film festivals ==
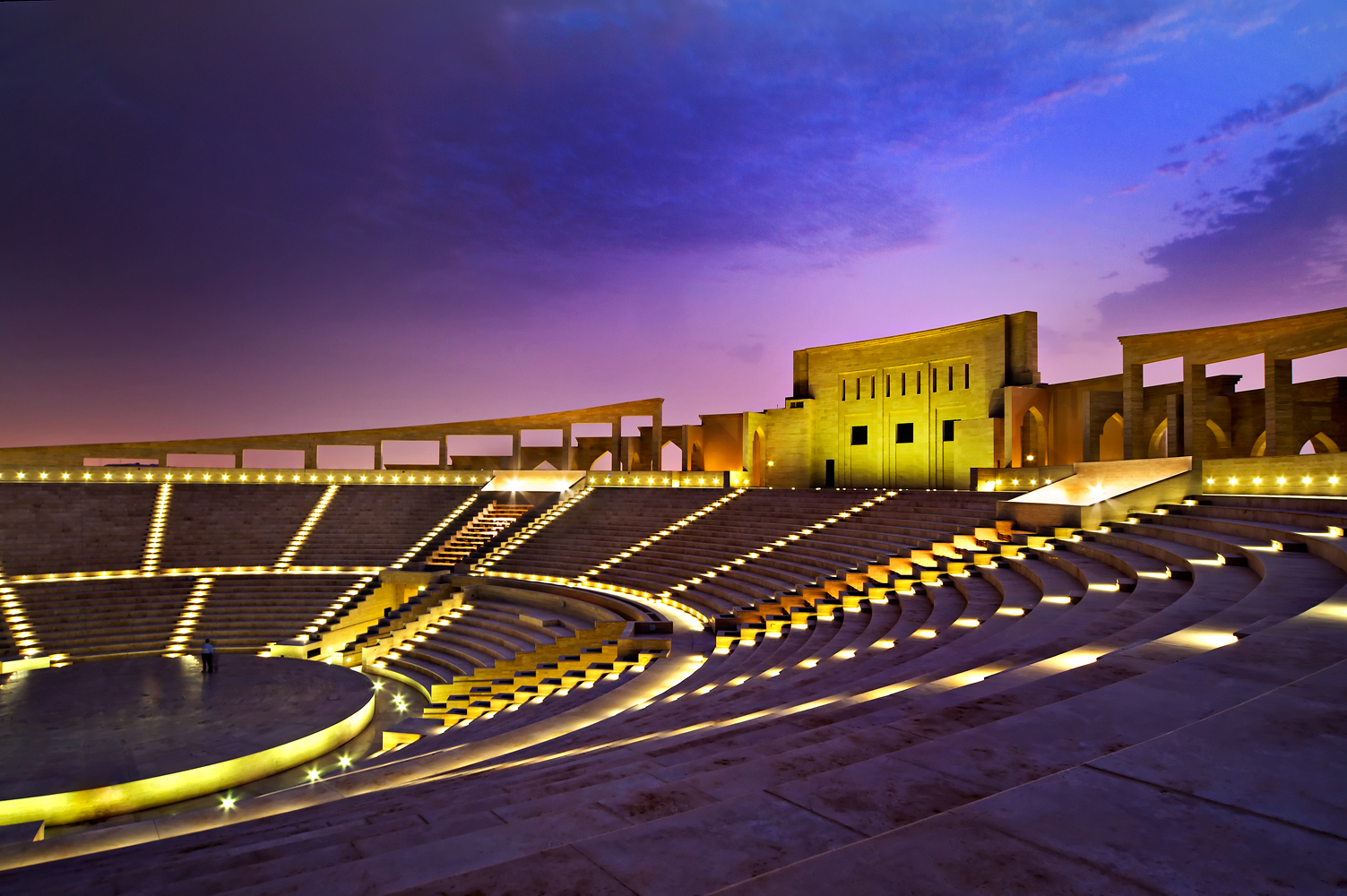
Katara's amphitheater in which festival films premiered

=== Doha Tribeca Film Festival ===
The Doha Tribeca Film Festival was an annual film festival held from 2009 to 2012. It emanated from a collaboration between the Doha Film Institute and Tribeca Enterprises. Celebrities such as Robert De Niro, Salma Hayek, Adel Emam, Mira Nair, and Kevin Spacey attended the festivals. The festivals and premieres took place in the Katara Cultural Village every year as well as The Museum of Islamic Art, Doha in 2012. The DTFF premiered up to 87 films from all around the world.

=== Ajyal Film Festival ===
"Ajyal" is a word that translates to Generations in Arabic. This film festival is something that DFI—Doha Film Festival initiated in 2012. This festival opens the ground for people to be a part of conversations that involve the crucial elements of art, including films, entertainment and creativity. The focus of this Festival revolves around aspects of cinema and being more aware and encouraging engagement in film-centric dialogues. The purpose of this festival is to cultivate and encourage regional and local talents to partake in the event. Moreover, this festival is meant to showcase the opportunities that come hand in hand with exposing the society to the essential lessons of being more aware of artistic ways of self-expression and the effectiveness of filmmaking as a tool of commentary regarding cultural, societal and political topics.

The ways in which this festival cultivates and encourages local and regional talents is by giving recognizing local talents and giving them awards for their contributions and hard work. The winners of Best Films are given funding for their next projects. These endorsements allow the continuation allows the local talents to further their career and mark their name within the growing industry. The awards and recognition also helps promote and encourage future content and talents to be more prevalent and seek to establish their presence and passion for filmmaking, which serves the overall goal of establishing the film industry to be more widespread and recognized, internationally. The winners are determined by audience voting alongside a jury of professionals that determine the outcome.

Ajyal also utilizes their festival for cultivating young talents that have an interest in film making industry, by implementing volunteering from people aged 18 and above. The volunteers are guaranteed to gain exposure and experience in their involvement with the festival. The experience of interacting with industry professionals and being able to have contacts from within the world of film as well as attending screenings and have hand-on knowledge from people heavily integrated within the business.

Made in Qatar is a section within the Ajyal Youth Film Festival that provides a platform for filmmakers based in Qatar to showcase their work to the local and international community. The selection includes short fiction films, short documentaries, and short experimental films. An award is given to the best film in each of those categories.

=== Qumra ===
Qumra is a part of Doha Film Institute’s (DFI) enterprise that provides services such as developing films and mentorship opportunities for aspiring filmmakers. Every year Qumra collects innovators from the worlds of film, technology, and television to give talks to inspire and share their knowledge with the public. People have the opportunity to choose from the 13 events they offer; including masterclasses with filmmakers, script consultations, industry screenings and many more.

== Qatari Film Fund ==
Doha Film Institute (DFI) opens their call for admissions annually between 1–19 September, accepting short and feature-length film proposals for development. This offers a platform for local talents to produce their films, and they accept up to eight films every year. Although the funding guidelines for short and feature films share similarities, there are a few fundamental differences. For instance, short films must include a Qatari national as a director. Animated shorts must be 7 minutes long, Narratives up to 12 minutes and Documentaries up to 30 minutes long. Adding to that, directors are not allowed to be working on other projects during this time, and projects that are in production or post-production are not eligible; however, if the applicant applied for funding in previous years and were not accepted, the same project can be used for re-application. When it comes to feature films, applicants must have produced at least one short film to be considered.

The Qatari Film Fund has funded a number of projects to date.

== Notable Qatari films ==
Clockwise, released in 2010, was the first full-length feature film to be shot in Qatar. The film showcases Khaleeji and Qatari culture and tradition as it showcases local folklore. The film was produced and funded by the ministry of Culture and was widely praised for the soundtrack written by Polish composer Maciek Dobrowolski

Black Gold is a French-Qatari Film released in 2011. This movie was shot between Qatar and Tunisia and is the largest cinematic project undertaken by the Arab world.

== Notable Qatari directors and filmmakers ==
Ahmed Al-Baker started his career in filmmaking in 2009. He wrote, directed and produced his first feature film The Package: Volume 1. The film was produced in Doha by the film production company Innovation Production, which was co-founded by Ahmed Al-Baker along with his peers. Interested in sci-fi horror and thriller genres, Ahmed created Lockdown: Red Moon Escape and the TV series Medinah. Al-Baker was supervisor of the opening ceremony of the 2022 FIFA World Cup.

AlJawhara Al-Thani's (a.k.a. A.J. Al-Thani) love for movies was sparked when she first watched Star Wars at the age of six. AJ's journey as a filmmaker began when she participated in a filmmaking workshop offered by the Doha Film Institute, and since then she had continuously developed her skill as a filmmaker with DFI's support. AJ's first short film Kashta (2016) won Best Narrative award at Ajyal's Made in Qatar section. She is currently developing the script for her feature film Khuzama, a film about a Bedouin girl who embarks on an adventure far away from home.

Noor Al-Nasr is a Qatari filmmaker who obtained her bachelor’s in Graphic Design at VCUQ and MA at SCAD University in Atlanta, GA. She has always been interested in art and has participated in numerous exhibitions focusing on storytelling and filmmaking. Her shorts were part of many editions of the Ajyal Film Festival in Doha and the Cannes Film Festival in 2015 and 2016. ‘Sanad’, which she wrote and directed, is her latest work.

Hamida AlKuwari's career in filmmaking started when she made her first short film 15 Heartbeats (2011) which premiered at Doha Tribeca Film Festival. Her second short film Elevate (2017) tackles the troublesome relationship between a Qatari women, and her maid. Hamida is currently working on her first feature film documentary, To The Ends of the Earth which documents an environmental expedition to Antarctica. Having worked on this film, Hamida became the first Qatari woman to visit Antarctica.

Hend Fakhroo's first short film His Name (2012) documented a friendship between a Qatari woman and a cleaner. Hend's second short film, The Waiting Room (2016) also explored a friendship between two women who come from different backgrounds. The film screened at various festivals including the Ajyal Youth Film Festival, Beirut International Film Festival, and Malmö Arab Film Festival. Hend is working on her first feature film.

Amal Al-Muftah started making films in high school. She made her first short film Al Kora (2013) during an introductory filmmaking workshop at DFI. Amal's second film was a documentary called Al Hamali (2014), which gained more than 100 thousand views on YouTube in less than one week. Amal resumed her work on fiction films with Smicha (2016), and Sh'hab (2018). Both of those films won the Best Narrative at Ajyal's Made in Qatar section.

== Qatari production houses ==
=== The Film House ===
The Film House is a commercial production house in Qatar. The Film House specializes in photography as well as filming. They also provide filmmakers with services such as script development, pre-production, production, and post-production. They not only target film production, but also take on televised advertising campaigns, film festivals, social media outlets, digital signage, and public art installations. Their films include Hend Fakhroo’s The Waiting Room, A.J. Al-Thani’s Kashta, and Nouf Al-Sulaiti’s Gubgub.

=== Innovation Films ===
The first Qatari organization specialized in TV and Film production; in partnership with Hollywood, Innovation Films aims to produce and distribute high-quality films on an international level. The vision of Qatari Director Ahmed Al-Baker was to connect the two cinematic worlds and develop Qatar’s talent through classes such as directing, producing and script writing. They offer the chance to work on feature films, short films and commercials to give options to the aspiring talent. What Innovation Films is most proud of is that 80% of employees are local. Feature films such as Lockdown: Room Escape (2012), In Search of Adam and The Package along with shorts I (2013), His Name (2013) and Bidoon (2012) have all come out of Innovation Films.

== Talent ==
The Talent Factory is the biggest talent agency in Qatar. They provide access to contacts such as actors and performers who are willing to work in films, theatre, TV shows, and even events. Currently, there are more male actors (44) than female actresses (9). These actors mostly perform in TV shows and plays rather than films. However, with the growth of Qatari cinema, more acting roles for Qataris will be expected.

== Cinema operators ==
The major cinema operators in Doha are Vox, NOVO and Flik.

=== Vox ===
Owned by Majid Al Futtaim Cinema; one of the region's most prominent entertainment and successful businesses, VOX Cinema can be found in over 30 locations across the region. With screens in both the Middle East and North Africa, Vox designs its experience fitting to its location to ensure the audience feels right at home.

=== NOVO ===
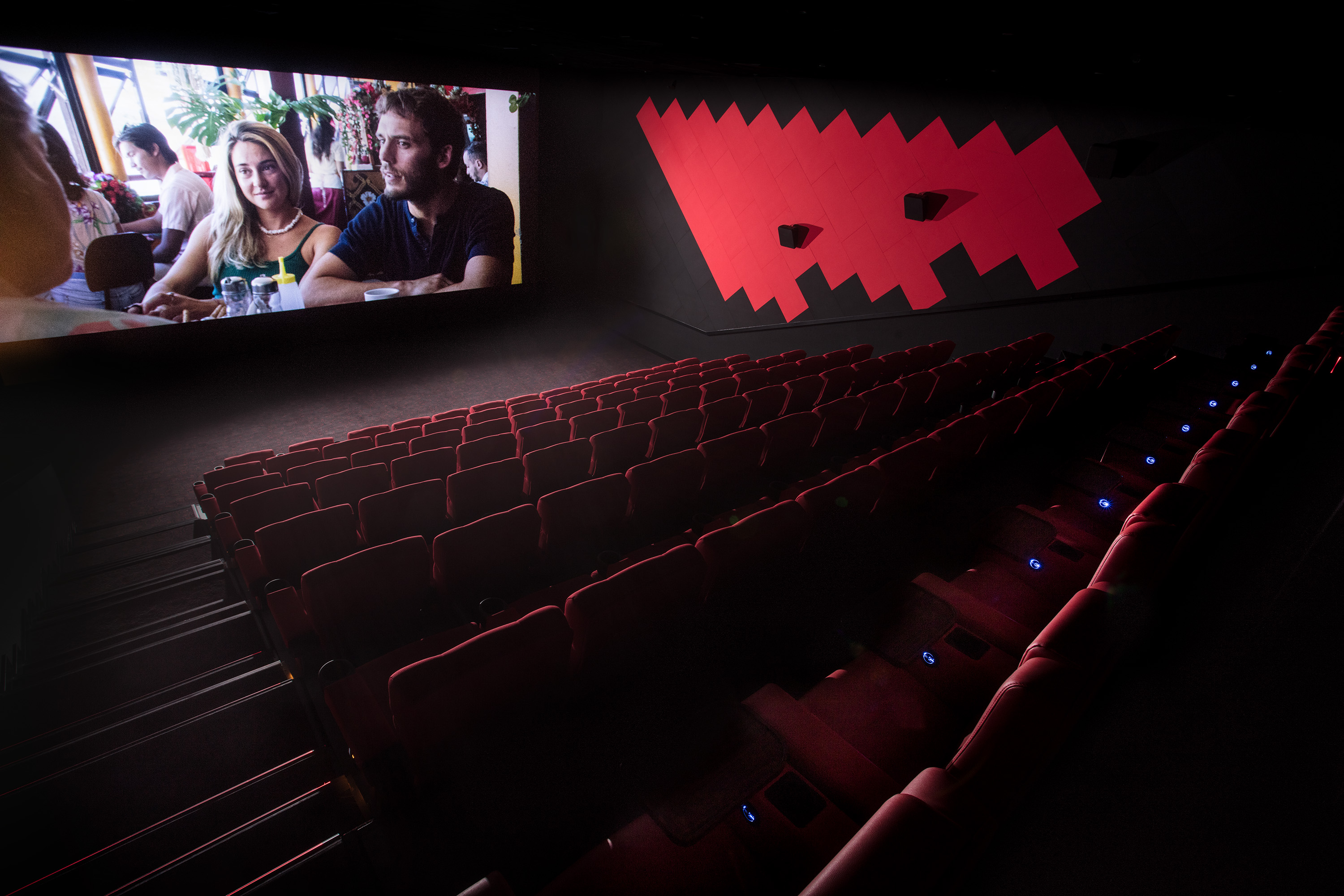
Novo Cinema Screen

Qatar is home to 39 Novo Cinemas screens that can be found in shopping centers such as Mall of Qatar, 01 Mall, The Pearl and Souq Waqif. Novo provides its customers with viewing experiences ranging from 2D cinema to the luxurious 7-star VIP treatment. When it comes to their snack options, Novo Cinemas provides its customers with the latest trends in the snack industry such as frozen-ice popcorn along with the option of ordering from gourmet menus that are served to your seat. Adding to that, Novo also offers its screens to non-cinematic events such as live viewing of sports and the opportunity to book private viewings.

=== Flik ===
Flik Cinemas is a local business in association with Al Mana Group. They have 12 screens across two locations; Lagoona Mall and Mirqab Mall that promise to provide the 5-Star treatment to its customers.

== Foreign films shot in Qatar ==
Bediuner (1959) is a documentary film shot by Danish photographer and filmmaker Jette Bang in 1959 as part of the Danish Expedition to Qatar. The film documents the lives of al-Na’im and al-Murrah Bedouins over the course of two and a half months.

Cruel Summer (2012) is a 7-screen film directed by musician Kanye West which premiered in the Cannes Film Festival. The film featured Arab and Gulf artists such as Hayat Al-Fahad and Ali Suliman. This film was shot in multiple locations within the Gulf region including Qatar. In the making of this film, many Arab figures were heavily included. This film is notable due to its contributions in placing Qatar on the map within the film industry by showcasing its potential in supporting the arts of filmmaking and thrusting local talents under the global spotlight.

The Workers Cup (2017) is a film directed by Adam Sobel. It features Asian and African migrant workers who are involved in the construction of Qatar's venues for the 2022 FIFA World Cup, and their participation in a local football tournament known as the Worker's Cup. During the film, the living conditions of Qatar's labor camps are explored. This movie explores the reasons behind the individual workers moving to work in Qatar, and the prospects for providing for their families back home. Although the movie does shed light on the cruel and unfair circumstances of people within the work force, Sobel sheds light on a universal story that resonates with soccer fans and people everywhere.
