= Amanda Palmer (film executive) =

Australian film executive

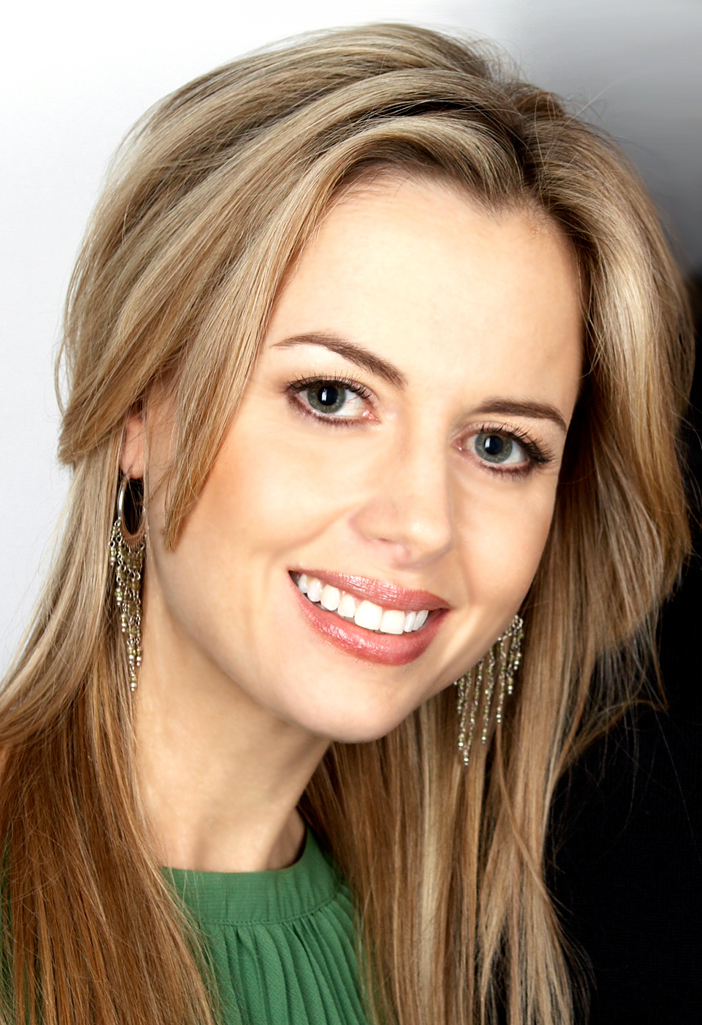
- Born: 1976 (age 49–50); Australia
- Occupations: Film and media executive, producer, journalist
- Website: amanda-palmer.com

Amanda Palmer (born 1976) is an Australian-English media and film executive and international journalist, whose 18-year-career in film and media entertainment, content creation and entertainment platforms has spanned Australia, Britain, United States and the Middle East.

Palmer served as the Executive Director of Doha Film Institute (DFI), an organisation she set up on behalf of Qatar's Sheikha Al-Mayassa bint Hamad bin Khalifa Al-Thani, as well as running the Doha Tribeca Film Festival (DTFF) from 2009 to 2012.

At DFI, Palmer oversaw three TEDx events, the most significant being TEDxSummit in April 2011 in Qatar, the first event of its kind.

Palmer resigned from DFI as Executive Director to set up her own company while consulting in multi-media, film, content and entertainment.

From 2006 to 2011, Palmer was also Head of Entertainment at Al Jazeera English and created, produced and presented flagship programs, including the cultural travel series “48” and flagship specialist film program, The Fabulous Picture Show, which was still broadcast in 2012 to global audiences.

== Early life ==
Palmer was born in Australia to a British father and an Australian mother and has four younger siblings. While growing up Palmer moved frequently between cities and countries, and completed her undergraduate education at University of Technology, Sydney with a B.A. in Communications, majoring in journalism, while also studying film and theatre at Australian Theatre for Young People (ATYP) and studying vocal performance at Australian Institute of Music (AIM).

== Early career ==
Palmer launched her professional journalistic career as a cadet, joining Seven Network Australia where her first producer and reporter role was on the long-running daily news and long format feature program 11am before transitioning to a national producer and reporter in the Sydney bureau at the age of 21.

In 1996, Palmer was among ten global journalists selected to take part of CNN's International Professional Program based at the Atlanta headquarters for two months, launching her foray into global content and international journalism.

Shortly after, Palmer relocated to London to pursue her international career, first joining CNN London's Business International, then The Music Room. Shortly after, she also earned the coveted role as European bureau chief and foreign correspondent based in London for Seven Network in 2001, producing daily news and current affairs and travelled to the US to cover events shortly after the September 11 attacks in New York City. Palmer joined Associated Press Television in 2003, during the coverage of the second Iraq War. In 2005, she joined Al Jazeera English as Head of Entertainment and went on to create, produce and direct the flagship international feature programs, The Fabulous Picture Show and the popular cultural travel series, 48, which saw her produce specialist programming from 16 countries, including Syria, Chad, and Bosnia, and was broadcast regularly to millions of global viewers.

== Film career ==
In April 2007, Palmer was asked to assist Qatar to develop a film festival and film industry, based on educating, training and inspiring local film culture and contribute to the building of Qatar’s long term film industry, playing a role similar to that of Qatar-created media channel, Al Jazeera, which had become instrumental in building an independent broadcaster for the Arab world ten years earlier.

On behalf of the Emir's daughter, Sheikha Al-Mayassa bint Hamad bin Khalifa Al-Thani, Palmer developed and executed a strategic vision to set up a film-making and film-appreciation culture and organically support the growth of the local film community by first launching a community minded festival film festival known as Doha Tribeca Film Festival and spearheading a partnership with Tribeca Enterprises, while also launching local film education ahead of the festival.

Palmer led this endeavour, with the festival attracting 5,000 people on opening night. Shortly after, Palmer spearhead the building of Qatar’s first international independent cultural organization dedicated to film, the Doha Film Institute (DFI) founded and chaired by Sheikha Al Mayassa, which was officially launched in May 2010 at the Cannes Film Festival alongside an ambitious commitment to fund Arab films, which included regional grants for award-winning Middle Eastern films: Hawi (Ibrahim El Batout), A Man of Honour (Jean Claude Codsi) and Where Do We Go Now? (Nadine Labaki).

Meanwhile, Palmer also led three international and community-minded Doha Tribeca Film Festivals (DTFF) which included an Arab film competition for documentary and narrative films. A new award was added in 2011 for local Qatar filmmakers, known as ‘Made in Qatar’.

The festival was a cultural partnership with Tribeca Enterprises which she managed from 2007 and launched with the first festival in 2009. More than 5,000 guests watched the opening night film and 50,000 local and international attendees over the five-day festival event, an unprecedented success in Qatar for this kind of film event.

During her tenure, Palmer also built teams for DFI's year-round strategy and initiatives which included community outreach programs, professional mentoring programs to develop local film talent; year round film programming of independent films in the country; setting up Qatar’s first in-house content driven film website, driven by year round social media campaigns. Palmer’s last project was the Gulf Development Unit (GDU), appointing Qatari filmmaker Mahdi Ali Ali to focus on Qatari filmmakers. Palmer also managed high-level relationships that included industry legends and cultural and educational partnerships like Robert De Niro’s Tribeca Enterprises, Martin Scorsese’s World Cinema Foundation and Mira Nair's Maisha Labs while also working closely with Qatar's government, especially the Ministry of Culture.

At Doha Film Institute, Palmer set up and managed the Film Financing Division that supported over 70 local, regional and international films including Qatar's first international co-production Jean-Jacques Annaud's Black Gold starring Antonio Banderas, Freida Pinto, Tahar Rahim, Mark Strong which was number one in the UAE box office in 2011. Palmer oversaw DFI's co-productions on additional projects including Salma Hayek and Participant Media's feature adaptation of Khalil Gibran's The Prophet; Mira Nair's The Reluctant Fundamentalist, which opened the 2012 Venice Film Festival and played at festivals in Toronto, London and Doha; Kanye West's Cruel Summer “seven screens” installation which premiered at Cannes in 2012 — filmed entirely in Qatar, including 100 local extras and featuring Qatar's first woman in a lead role, a media student credited as ‘Sara’; and acclaimed Lebanese director, Ziad Doueiri’s The Attack — screened at the 2012 Toronto International Film Festival, Telluride Film Festival, San Sebastian Film Festival and many other films which were set for release in 2013.

As Executive Director, Palmer's role was high profile and visible as the organisation's key spokesperson.

In July 2012, Palmer resigned from her DFI Executive Director role to continue her own pursuits.
