= Premiere =

First public performance of a work

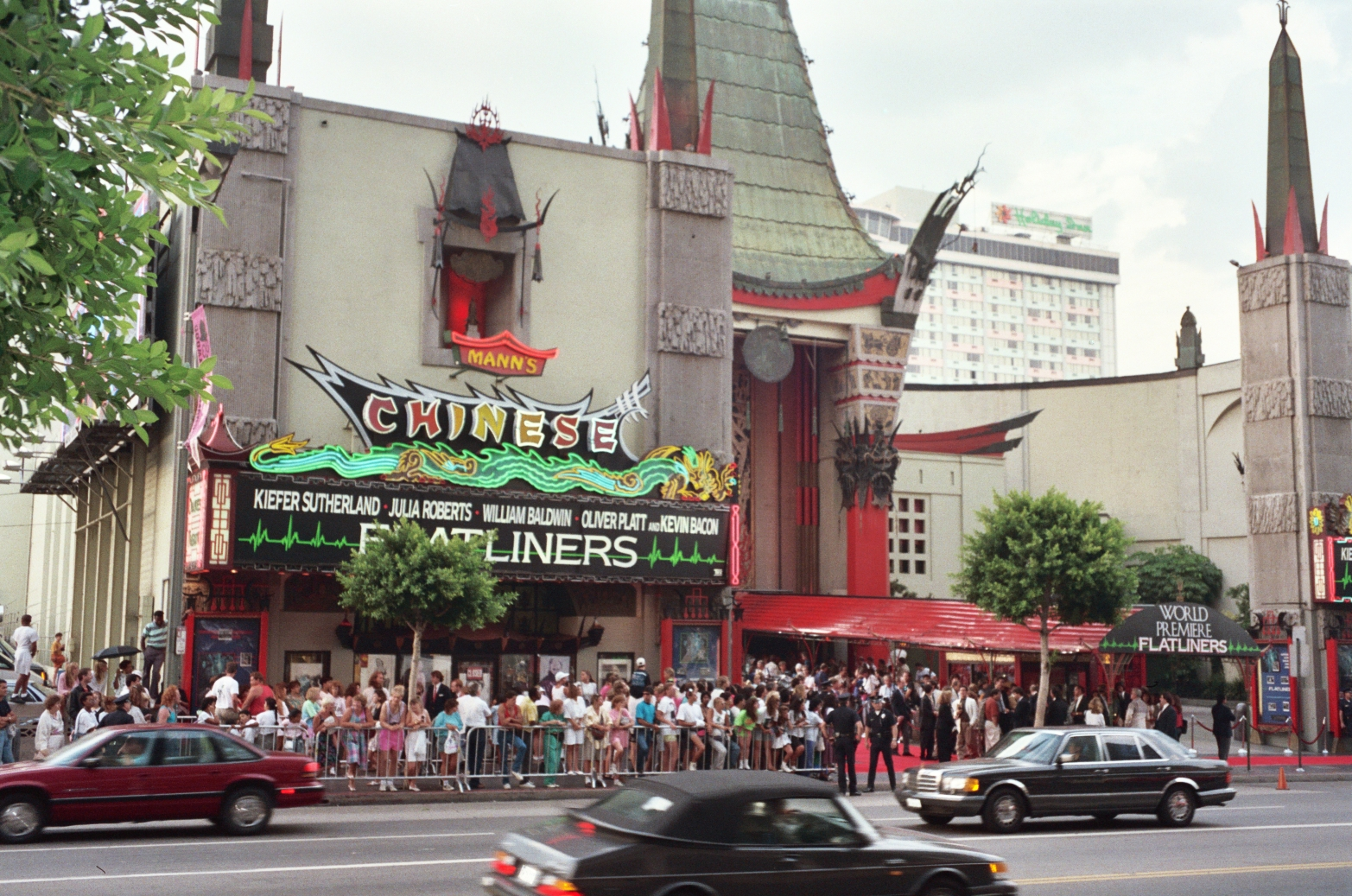
Film premiere for Flatliners, Grauman's Chinese Theatre, Hollywood, 1990

A premiere, also spelled première, (from French: première, 1^{re}, transl. first, 1st) is the debut (first public presentation) of a work, i.e. play, film, dance, musical composition, or even a performer in that work.

== History ==
Raymond F. Betts attributes the introduction of the film premiere to showman Sid Grauman, who founded Grauman's Chinese Theatre. The first ever Hollywood premiere was for the 1922 film Robin Hood, starring Douglas Fairbanks, in front of the Egyptian Theatre. By the late 1920s the red carpet had become synonymous with film premieres.

== Classification ==
There are a number of different types:

Types
Category	Definition	Ref
World	The first public presentation.	
International	The first public presentation outside the country of production.	
Continental	The first public presentation in a specified continent.	
Country	The first public presentation in a specified country.	
Regional	The first public presentation in a specified region.	
State	The first public presentation in a specified country's state.	
City	The first public presentation in a specified city.	
Online	The first presentation as an initial publication on the Internet.	
International online	The first publication on the Internet after public presentation domestically in the country of production.	

A single work will often have many premieres. For example, in film, the 2019 United States movie Aladdin held its world premiere at the Grand Rex in Paris, France, on 8 May 2019, its first regional premiere in Jordan on 13 May 2019, and its United States premiere on 24 May 2019. Likewise, in music, Beethoven's Symphony No. 9 received its world premiere in the Theater am Kärntnertor in Vienna on 7 May 1824, and subsequently received a premiere in England at the Argyll Rooms in London on 21 March 1825.

When a work originates in a country that speaks a different language from that in which it is receiving its premiere, it is possible to have two premieres for the same work, e.g., the French-language version of the play The Maids by Jean Genet received its British premiere (which was also its world premiere) in 1952, and subsequently its English-language premiere in Britain in 1956.

== Festivals ==
=== Significance of a premiere ===
The type of premiers that a work receives will impact on how the work is treated by festivals, including the categorization of the work in screening sessions, e.g. Fantastic Fest, and even as the basis of its submission requirements, e.g. Sundance Film Festival eligibility rules require that United States feature films, both narrative and documentary, have retained their world premier status, whilst international feature films, both narrative and documentary, have retained the international premiere status.

Premiering at a film festival has been used to gain publicity for a film, even without a distributor already in place, and can even allow last minute editing. Director Alex Winter said, of film festival premiers, "It helps me get a sense of what my work is or isn't communicating. We've often made little tweaks and changes after we've premiered it at a few film festivals."

=== Online premieres ===
Concerns existed about online premieres, when in 2020, during the coronavirus pandemic, festivals had to become either partially online, e.g. SXSW and Tribeca, or fully online, e.g. CPH:DOX, Visions du Reel. Director Alex Winter even went so far as to pull his documentary Zappa out of both SXSW and CPH:DOX rather than let the film premiere there, saying "Our main concern was sales. Being online with these festivals would be the equivalent of a streaming distribution deal."

On 29 May 2020, upon the cancellation of a number festivals, including the Tribeca Film Festival, an International film festival called We Are One was organised where films were globally streamed, via YouTube, in an event containing 13 world premieres, 31 online premieres, and 5 international online premiers. Director Lina Soualem, who reluctantly kept her film Their Algeria in for an online premier at We Are One said "At first, your automatic feeling is, 'No, I don't want to do that, ... I felt distressed because this would be the first time I would show an audience my film, so I was upset that it (would have to) be online." but said she relented as "I was observing (the Doha Film Institute's Qumra event) online, and it was a good experience. I spoke to many programmers and professionals, and little by little, I understood we are all in the same situation and times are so uncertain that if I decided to say 'no,' I wouldn't know what would happen next with the film."

Fionnuala Halligan of Screen Daily questioned the legitimacy of the festivals without physically screened premiers, saying "Is premiere status demanded by A-list festivals still valid, and if not world, then national or international, or online – how much do they matter in the time of Covid?" On the complications of incorporating online premiers during the new online reformatting of festivals, Halligan said that another burning question was "Would a geo-locked online premiere at a smaller festival jeopardise a filmmaker's chances for showing their "international premiere" at another, perhaps larger, more covetable event (for which the selection hasn't yet been announced)?"

== See also ==
- Season premiere
- Film festival
- Film release
- Television pilot
- Press line
