= Hawi =

Hawi may refer to:

- Al-Hawi, Hadhramaut, a village in eastern Yemen
- Hawi, Hawaii
- Hawi (film), a 2010 film

== People with the surname ==
- George Hawi, Lebanese politician
- Khalil Hawi, Lebanese poet
- William Hawi, Lebanese politician
