= Red carpet =

Marking route used for arrivals of dignitaries

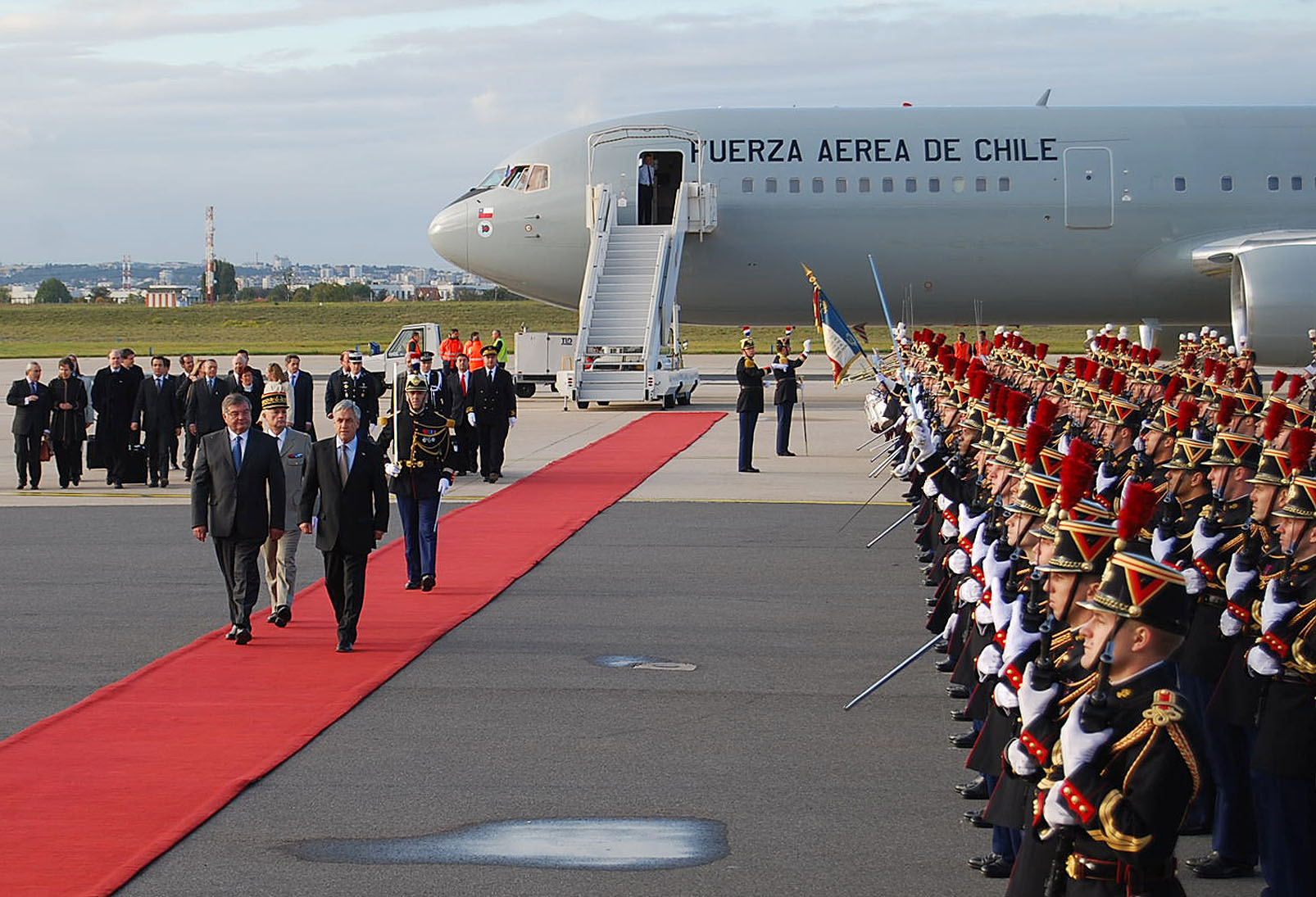
Chilean President Sebastián Piñera arriving in Paris in October 2010

A red carpet is traditionally used to mark the route taken by heads of state on ceremonial and formal occasions, and has in recent decades been extended to use by VIPs and celebrities at formal events.

== History ==
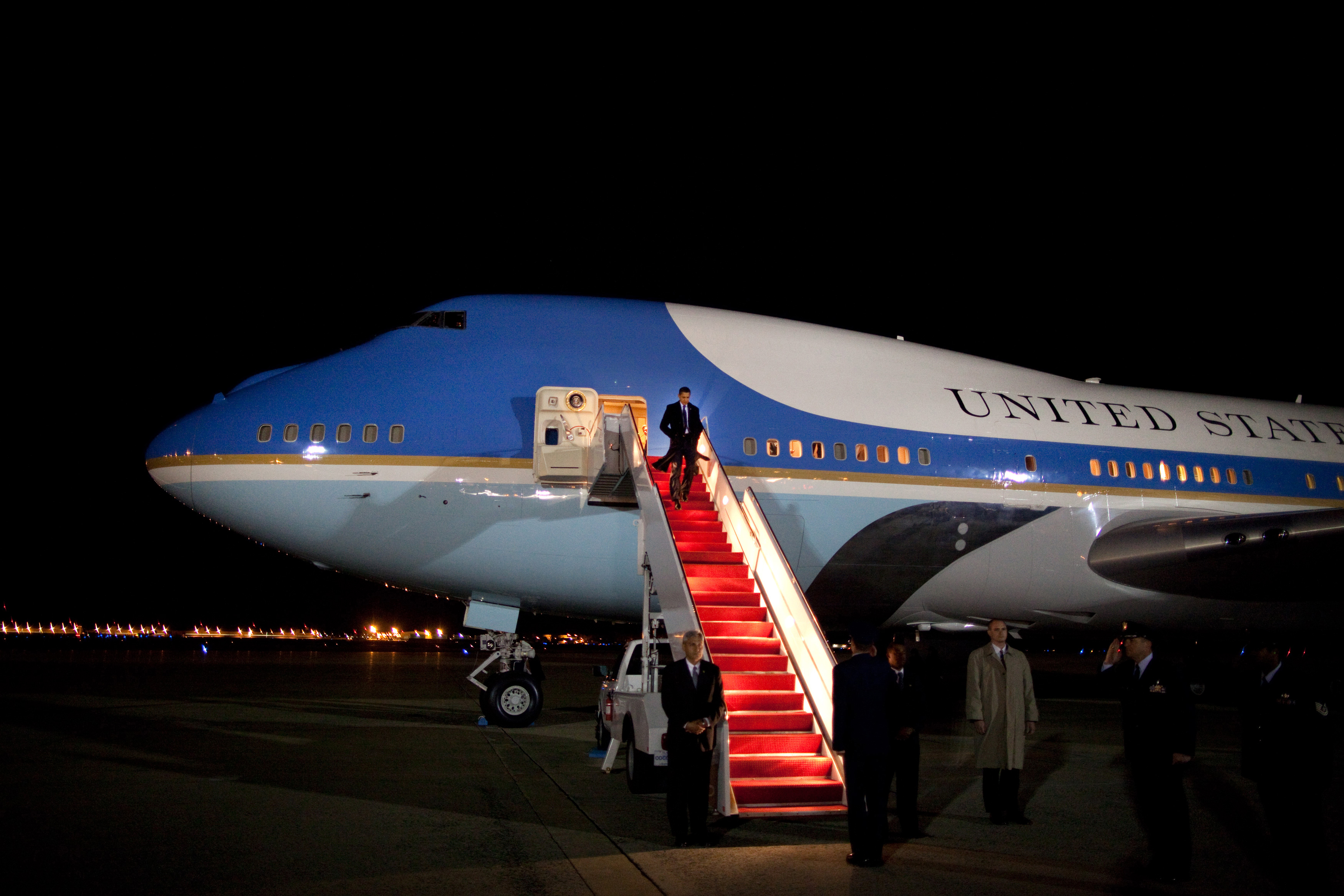
United States President Barack Obama exiting Air Force One on red carpet

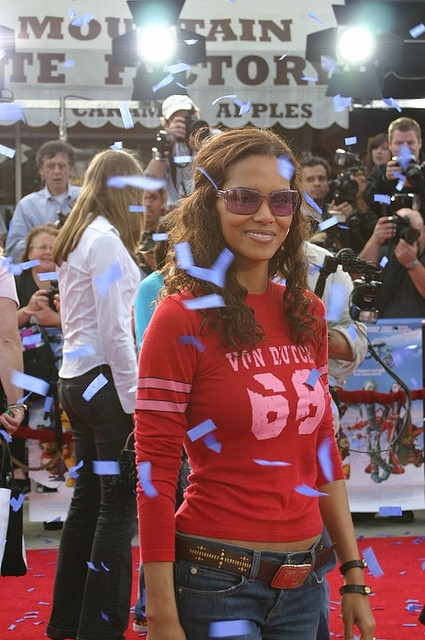
Halle Berry attending the premiere of the movie Robots

The earliest known reference to walking a red carpet in literature is in the play Agamemnon by Aeschylus, written in 458 BC. When the title character returns from Troy, he is greeted by his wife Clytemnestra who offers him a red path to walk upon:

Now, dearest husband, come, step from your chariot.
But do not set to earth, my lord, the conquering foot
That trod down Troy. Servants, do as you have been bidden;
Make haste, carpet his way with crimson tapestries,
Spread silk before your master's feet; Justice herself
Shall lead him to a home he never hoped to see.

Agamemnon, knowing that only gods walk on such luxury, responds with trepidation:

I count it dangerous, being mortal, to set foot
On rich embroidered silks. I would be reverenced
As man, not god. The praise of fame rings clear without
These frills and fancy foot-rugs;

Renaissance paintings often show rugs and carpets in oriental patterns, with red often the main background colour, laid on the steps to a throne, or on a dais where rulers or sacred figures are placed.

A red carpet was rolled out to welcome the arrival of United States president James Monroe in South Carolina in 1821. In 1902, the New York Central Railroad began using plush crimson carpets to direct people as they boarded their 20th Century Limited passenger train. This is believed to be the origin of the phrase "red-carpet treatment".

By the late 1920s the red carpet had become synonymous with Hollywood and film premieres. A crimson-hued carpet was used for the first ever Hollywood premiere, the 1922 premiere of Robin Hood, starring Douglas Fairbanks, in front of the Egyptian Theatre. For the following decades, the red carpet was one of the few places the public could catch a glimpse of stars like Clark Gable, Jimmy Stewart and Grace Kelly.

In 1961, the red carpet was introduced at the Academy Awards at the Santa Monica Civic Auditorium. In 1964, the broadcasters of the ceremony opted to film outside the venue, showing the arrival of guests as they stepped out of their limousines. From this point forward, the red carpet became a globally acknowledged focal point for actors and actresses to make a grand entrance and showcase themselves at the Oscars.

== The entertainment industry and publicity events ==
For at least 4 decades, a red carpet, often called the "Hollywood red carpet" has been regularly used in gala celebrity and entertainment events such as the Academy Awards, Golden Globe Awards, Grammy Awards, Met Gala, and BAFTAs. While the awards ceremonies take place inside the venues, much of the publicity occurs outside, with journalists discussing the red carpet fashions and which famous fashion designers are being worn by the celebrities. Numerous photo-journalists are always present in the press line. The "Hollywood red carpet" has become an important product placement arena for the fashion industry, and it is often coupled with publicity backdrops which contain brand logos or emblems for photography and advertisement purposes.

=== Other colors ===
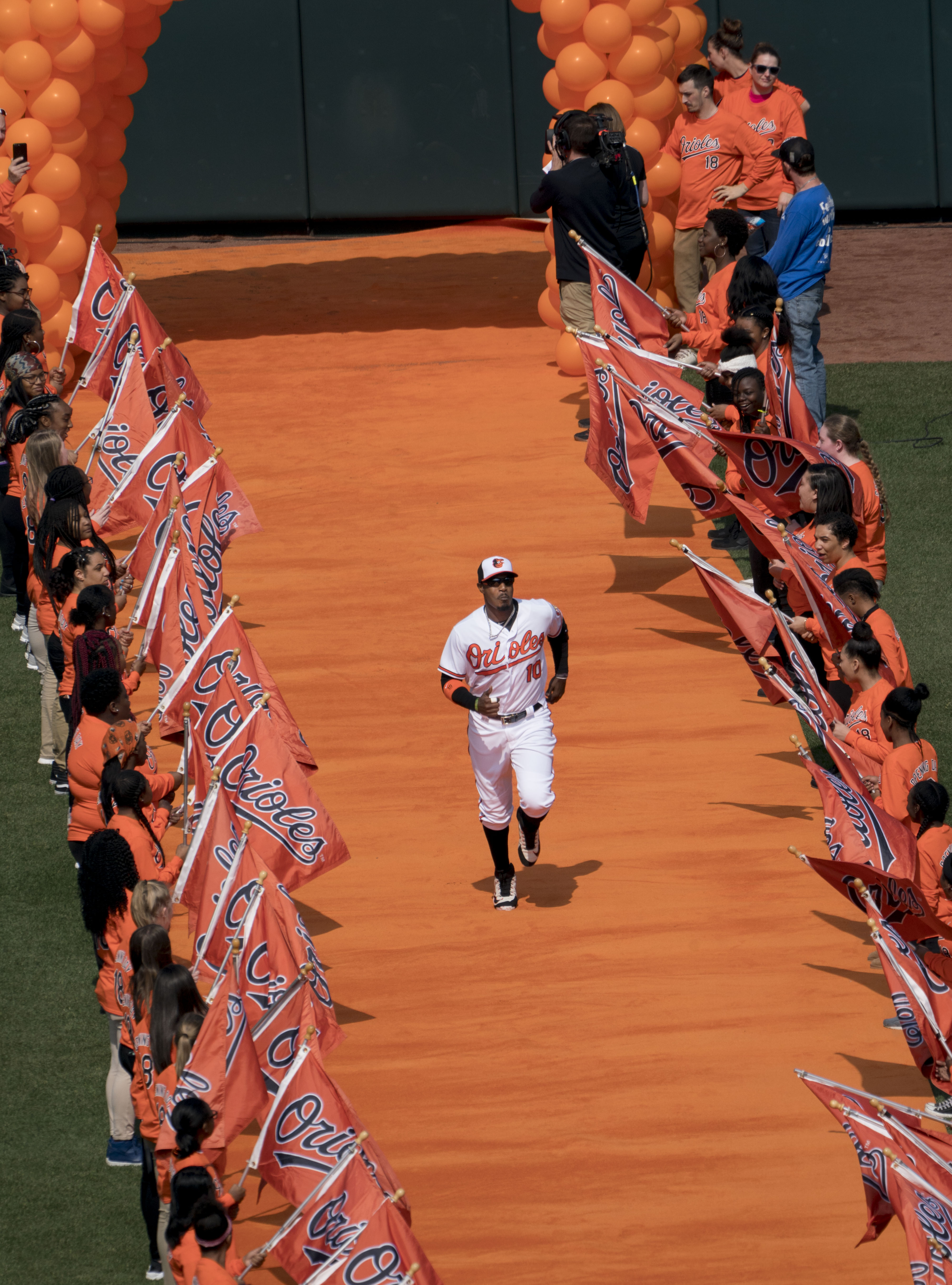
Adam Jones of the Baltimore Orioles jogs down an orange carpet on Opening Day at Camden Yards in 2018. Orange is the team's primary color.

Carpeting in other colors may replace red in some instances to honor a certain cause, such as a "green carpet" to promote environmental awareness; or, for a sponsored event, the sponsor's logo colors, such as the Nickelodeon Kids' Choice Awards, which uses an orange carpet to match the network's primary imaging color; The MTV Video Music Awards have similarly varied, with some editions having used black (2022), white (2016), and blue (2017) carpets.

In 2019, the premiere of the film Detective Pikachu (2019) used a yellow carpet to match the color of its title character Pikachu. The premiere of Sonic the Hedgehog (2020) used a blue carpet to match its namesake character.

At the 95th Academy Awards in 2023, the organizers chose a different champagne color for the first time since the red carpet was introduced, as part of an attempt to better reflect a "day event into the night".

The Jeopardy! Honors event, which was held annually since Season 39 on the eve of the Tournament of Champions, featured a blue carpet, in order to match the color of its background used during clues and dollar amounts shown on the clue board, from inside the Alex Trebek Stage at Sony Pictures Studios.

== Phrases ==
More generally, "red carpet treatment" and "rolling out the red carpet" usually refer to any special efforts made in the interests of hospitality.

== See also ==
- Red carpet fashion
