= 9/11 (2017 film) =

- Theatrical release poster
- Directed by: Martin Guigui
- Screenplay by: Martin Guigui; Steven Golebiowski
- Based on: Elevator by Patrick Carson
- Produced by: Dahlia Waingort; Maj Stermec; Rodric David
- Starring: Charlie Sheen; Gina Gershon; Luis Guzmán; Wood Harris; Olga Fonda; Jacqueline Bisset; Bruce Davison; Whoopi Goldberg
- Cinematography: Massimo Zeri
- Edited by: Eric Potter
- Music by: Jeff Toyne
- Production companies: Sprockefeller Pictures; Sunset Pictures; Black Bear Studios; Thunder Studios; The Film House; Vitamin A Films
- Distributed by: Atlas Distribution Company
- Release date: September 8, 2017
- Running time: 90 minutes
- Country: United States
- Language: English
- Box office: $200,229

9/11 is a 2017 American action drama film directed by Martin Guigui and written by Guigui and Steven Golebiowski. It is based on the stage play Elevator by Patrick James Carson, which takes place during the September 11 attacks at the World Trade Center in New York City. The film stars Charlie Sheen, Whoopi Goldberg, Gina Gershon, Luis Guzmán and Jacqueline Bisset, and was released in the United States on September 8, 2017.

== Plot ==
The film opens with a shot of the Lower Manhattan skyline on the early morning of September 11, 2001. Michael is a bicycle courier and wishes his young daughter a happy birthday before setting out on his delivery route. Metzie is getting coffee at a cafe before heading to the North Tower, where she works as an elevator dispatcher. At 8:00 am, billionaire trader Jeffrey Cage and his wife, Eve, are meeting in the law offices of the North Tower to sign divorce papers. At 8:46 am, Michael, Eve, and Jeffrey are descending in an elevator when American Airlines Flight 11 crashes into the 93rd-99th floors of the building, resulting in the elevator stopping around the 38th floor, and its electronic components to malfunction. Also in the elevator is Eddie, a maintenance man, and Tina, a woman who has come to the WTC to break up with her wealthy lover. They try to open the elevator doors to escape but are unable to do so due to a security locking system.

From the elevator dispatch center on the lower floors of the North Tower, Metzie communicates with the group over the elevator's public address system, telling them that their only hope is to force open the elevator door and send Eddie to the power room to rewire the elevator. The group inside the elevator begin to come up with plans to pry the door open. At first, they use their hands but it is stuck too tightly, then they try to open the emergency shaft above but it can only be opened from the outside.

Metzie informs the group that the firefighters are unable to reach the top floor and they must unbolt the locking mechanism to open the doors. Finally, they pry open the elevator door, Eddie is able to unlock the locking mechanism with a screwdriver, and break through a block of drywall into a janitor's room; only Eve gets out before the elevator lowers due to breaking cables, preventing the others from escaping via the hole. Jeffrey tells Eve that he loves her and promises to meet in the lobby before everyone in the elevator lies on their backs and brace for impact as the elevator begins falling. The elevator speeds down to the lobby level, but everyone survives with injuries. Eve finds a firefighter to help her open the elevator door and everyone gets out except Jeffrey, who is trapped in the elevator as it falls lower. The firefighter goes on top of the elevator, opens the emergency shaft, and reaches out to Jeffrey as the North Tower collapses.

== Cast ==
- Charlie Sheen as Jeffrey Cage
- Gina Gershon as Eve Cage
- Luis Guzmán as Eddie
- Wood Harris as Michael
- Olga Fonda as Tina
- Bruce Davison as Monohan
- Jacqueline Bisset as Diane
- Whoopi Goldberg as Metzie
- Faune A. Chambers as Holly
- Whitney Avalon as Nicki
- Ian Fisher as Fireman

== Production ==
In March 2016, it was announced Charlie Sheen and Whoopi Goldberg would star in Nine Eleven, an action-drama centered around five people trapped in an elevator in the World Trade Center during the September 11 attacks with filming scheduled to take place that month in Long Beach, California. Gina Gershon joined the cast later that month.

During filming, Sheen ate the same meal every day for three weeks to stay in character. The film was mostly shot at Thunder Studios, with additional filming on location in New York City. Due to a lack of studio backing, there were serious financial difficulties during filming. Three weeks before principal photography was set to begin, the production lost much of its financing because of the film’s controversial subject matter. The production also lost a tax credit from the California Film Commission because the production did not meet the job requirements, requiring producer Martin Sprock to fund the production with his own money.

== Release ==
The first trailer was released on July 21, 2017, receiving backlash. Zack Sharf of IndieWire described the film as appearing to be "one of the most offensive films ever made" in part due to "the collapse of the Twin Towers [being] used as a ticking-time clock." The New York Daily News also noted that the trailer had been "panned on social media as 'offensive'." The film was released on September 8, 2017, almost 16 years after the attacks took place.

== Reception ==
=== Box office ===
9/11 grossed $170,000 in the United States and Canada and $30,229 in other territories for a worldwide total of $200,229. The film received a 3-day release in North America, opening in 425 theaters. The film grossed $55,000 its first day and finished the weekend with $170,000, ranking 29th with an average of $400 per theater.

In Portugal, the film finished 16th in its first weekend with $9,588 in 11 theaters, and an average of $871 per screen. In its sophomore weekend, the film decreased 74.6% with $2,432, finishing 25th. The film finished out with $20,407 in box office receipts in the country. In South Africa, the film finished 18th in its first weekend, grossing $4,808 from 10 theaters with an average of $480 per screen. The film dropped 58.7% in its sophomore weekend to 22nd place, with $1,984 and an average of $180 per screen. The film stayed 22nd in its third weekend and finished in the country with $9,822 in box office receipts.

=== Critical response ===
On the review aggregator Rotten Tomatoes, the film has an approval rating of 20%, based on 10 reviews, with an average rating of 2.6/10. On Metacritic, the film has a weighted average score of 20 out of 100, based on 4 critics, indicating "generally unfavorable" reviews.

Kimber Meyers of the Los Angeles Times gave the film a negative review, saying "9/11 trades on the emotional weight of its namesake day, manipulating audiences into feelings that have nothing to do with the mess that is actually on screen." In an equally unfavorable review, Frank Scheck of The Hollywood Reporter noted that 9/11 "proves so exploitative that its end credits' dedication to the victims and first responders feels tawdry". Jezebel reviewer Rich Juzwiak wrote that although the film fades out with the words "Never Forget" written on the screen, "I won't, 9/11, but you've done your damnedest to make me want to."

Alonso Duralde of TheWrap praised the performances of Gina Gershon and Jacqueline Bisset and wrote: "Sixteen years later, 9/11 remains too touchy a subject for a movie as clumsy as 9/11 to get entirely right. And even if the film relies too much on the real-life horror of the actual event to loan it some gravitas, the performances touch the emotions honestly and deservedly."

=== Sheen's history with the 9/11 Truth movement ===
In 2006, Sheen called in to the far-right conspiracy theorist radio program hosted by Alex Jones to voice his support to the then-growing 9/11 Truth movement. Sheen suggested that the Twin Towers had been destroyed due to a controlled demolition, which was then followed by a cover-up by the US government. He went on to state: "It seems to me like 19 amateurs with box cutters taking over four commercial airliners and hitting 75% of their targets -- that feels like a conspiracy theory." In 2006, Sheen spoke at a 9/11 truther convention in Los Angeles with Jones, and later reaffirmed his beliefs about the conspiracy on Jimmy Kimmel Live!

When Sheen was interviewed by The Hollywood Reporter in September 2017, he reaffirmed his belief in the 9/11 truther movement, remarking, "I was not just coming up with stuff about 9/11. I was parroting those a lot smarter and a lot more experienced than myself, who had very similar questions. Not to put this behind us because, as brilliantly written, we must 'never forget,' but there are still a couple of things just rooted in simple physics that beg some measure of inquiry."

Saturday Night Live cast member Pete Davidson, whose firefighter father died in the 9/11 attacks, condemned the film in an Instagram post, citing Sheen's history with the Truther movement. Others characterized director Martin Guigui's decision to cast a vocal 9/11 Truther in a film about the attacks as hypocritical. Co-star Gina Gershon claimed not to have known about Sheen's earlier conspiracy-related statements until after filming on 9/11 had concluded. She remarked that she would have spoken to Sheen about those comments before committing to the project.

== See also ==
- List of cultural references to the September 11 attacks
- Collapse of the World Trade Center
- United 93
- World Trade Center
- List of firefighting films
