= Rudolf Staechelin =

Swiss art collector

Rudolf Staechelin (May 8, 1881 – January 3, 1946) was a Swiss businessman and art collector. He is considered one of the major Swiss collectors of the first half of the 20th century.

== Biography ==
Staechelin was born in Basel, Switzerland, to the master builder and contractor, Gregor Staechelin, and his wife Emma, née Allgeier. His father's family was originally from Istein, Germany. In 1922, he married Emma Mina Finkbeiner.

== Art collection ==
Staechelin's collection initially focused on French Impressionism and Post-Impressionism, later expanding to include East Asian art. In 1931, the Rudolf Staechelin’sche Familienstiftung (Rudolf Staechelin's Family Foundation) was established to act as custodian of the collection. Parts of the collection have been on loan for several decades to the Kunstmuseum Basel and the Musée d'Art et d'Histoire in Geneva.

The collection has included works by Édouard Manet, Claude Monet, Paul Gauguin, Paul Cézanne, Pierre-Auguste Renoir, Edgar Degas, Henri Matisse, Vincent van Gogh, and Pablo Picasso, among others.

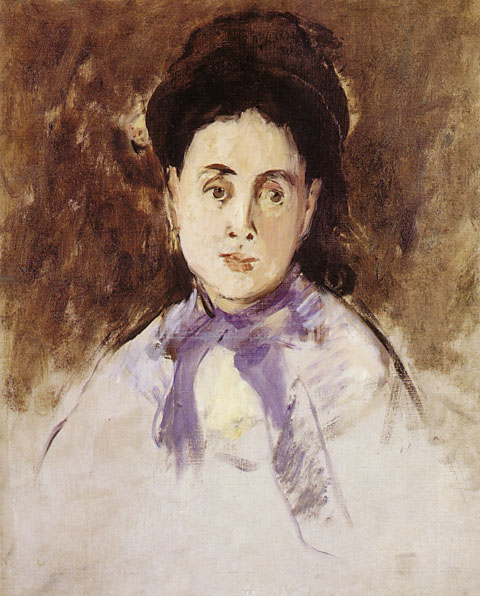
Édouard Manet:
Tête de femme

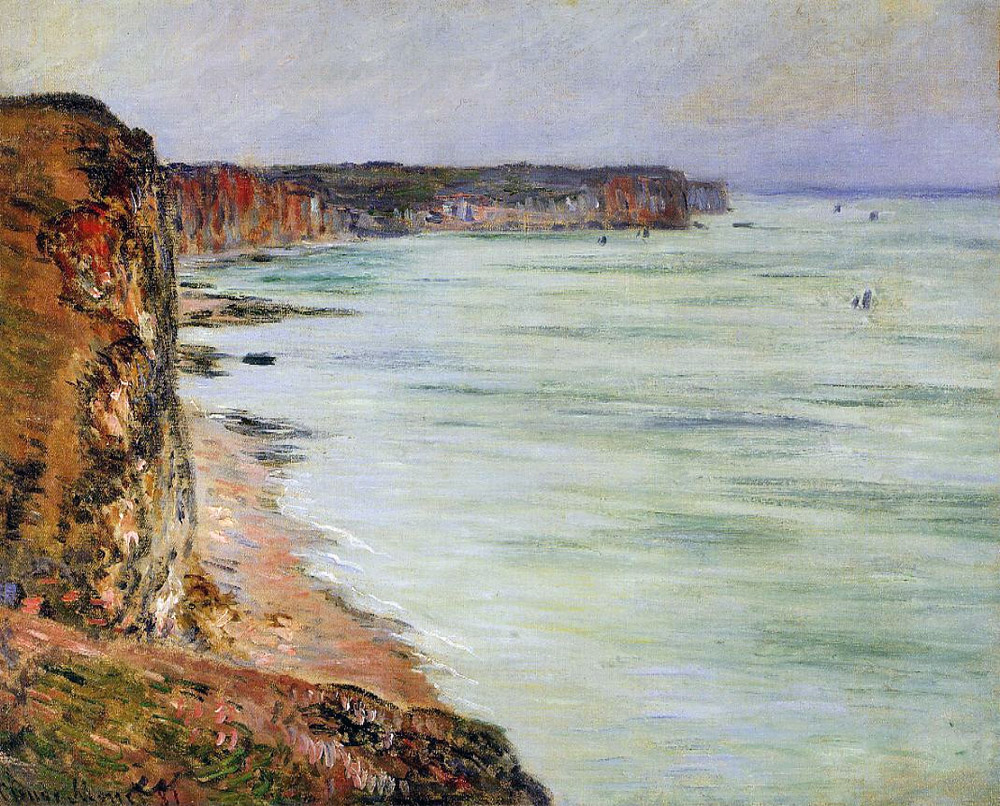
Claude Monet:
Temps calme, Pouurville

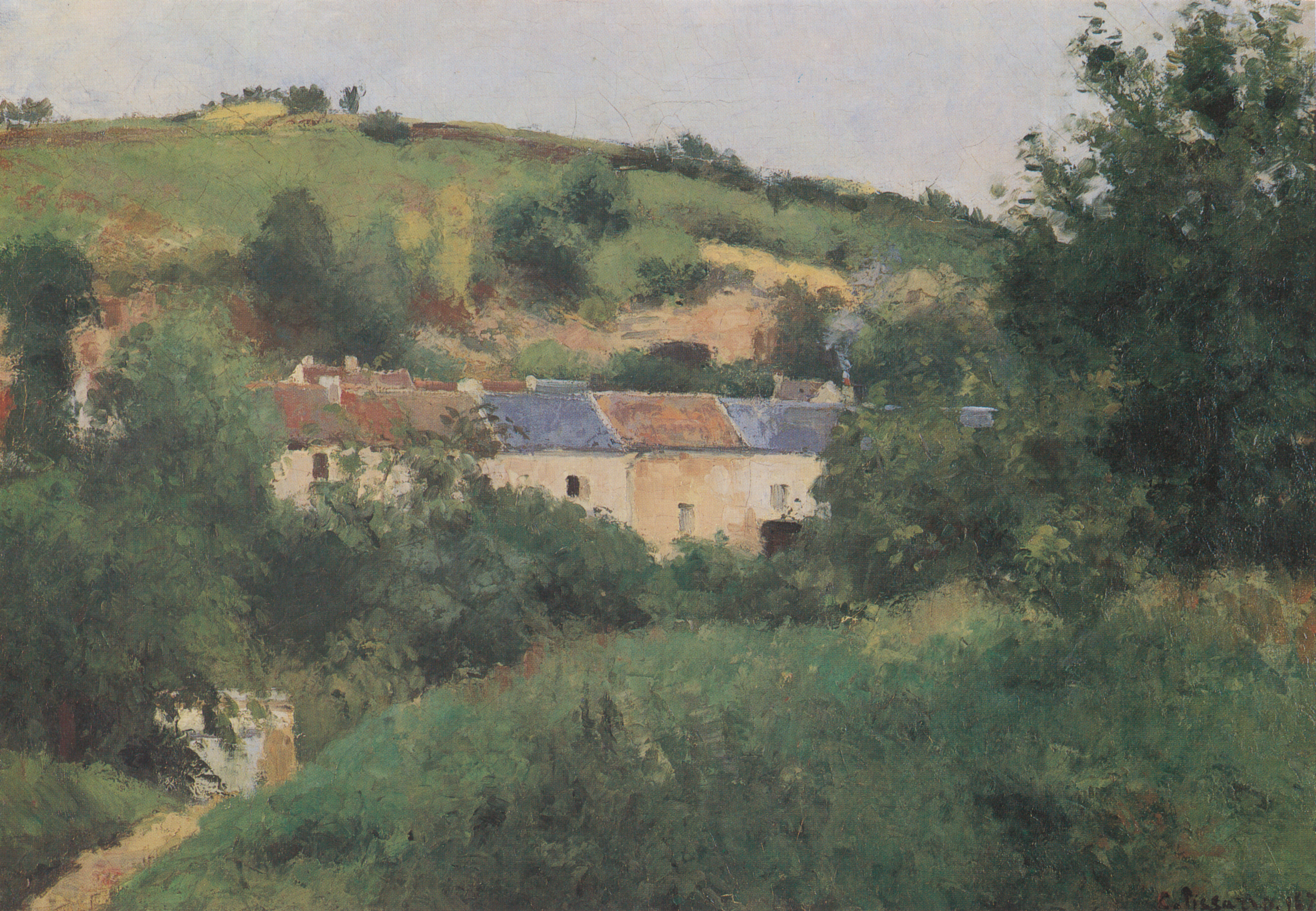
Camille Pissarro:
Le Sentier du Village

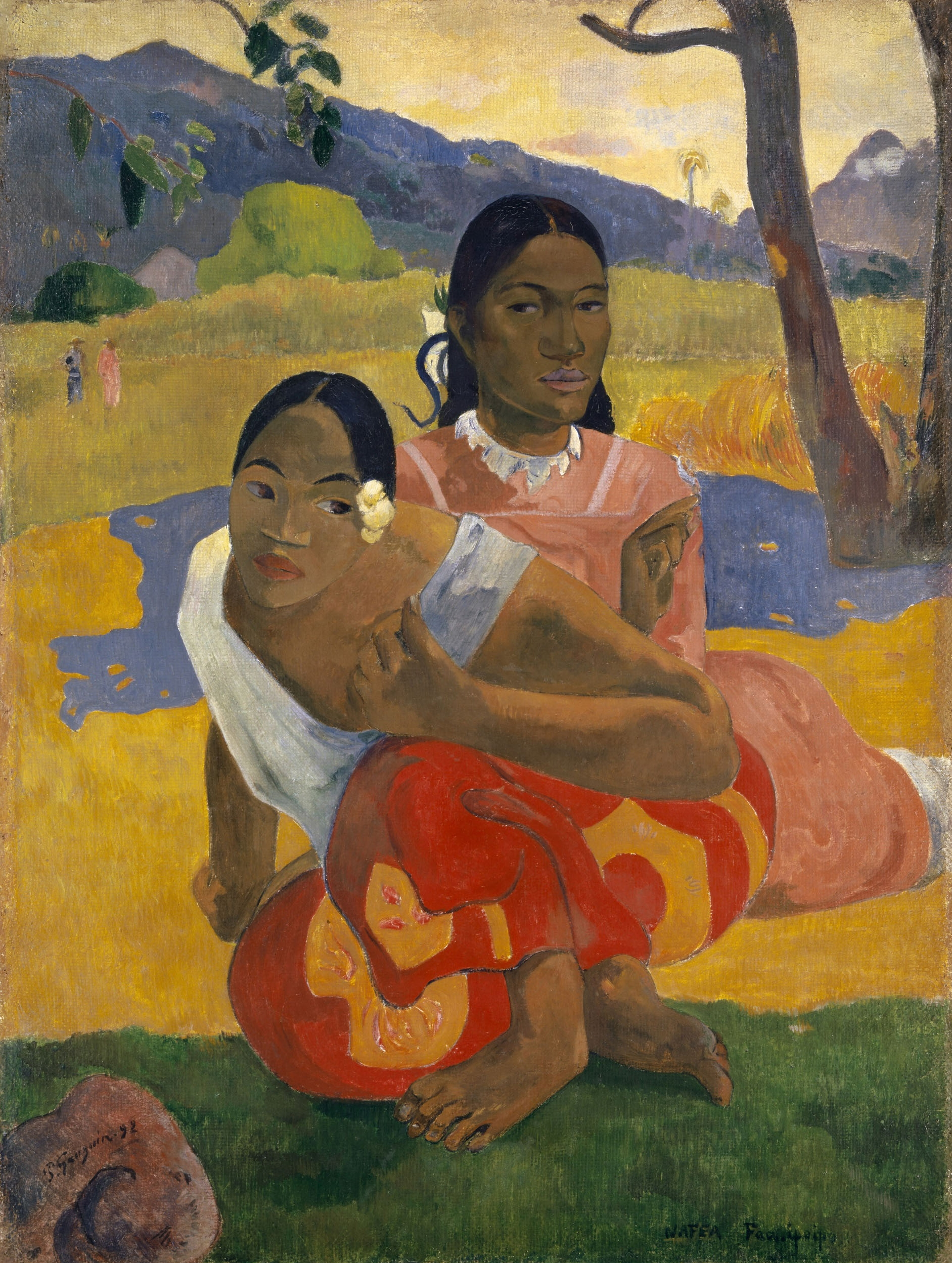
Paul Gauguin:
When Will You Marry?

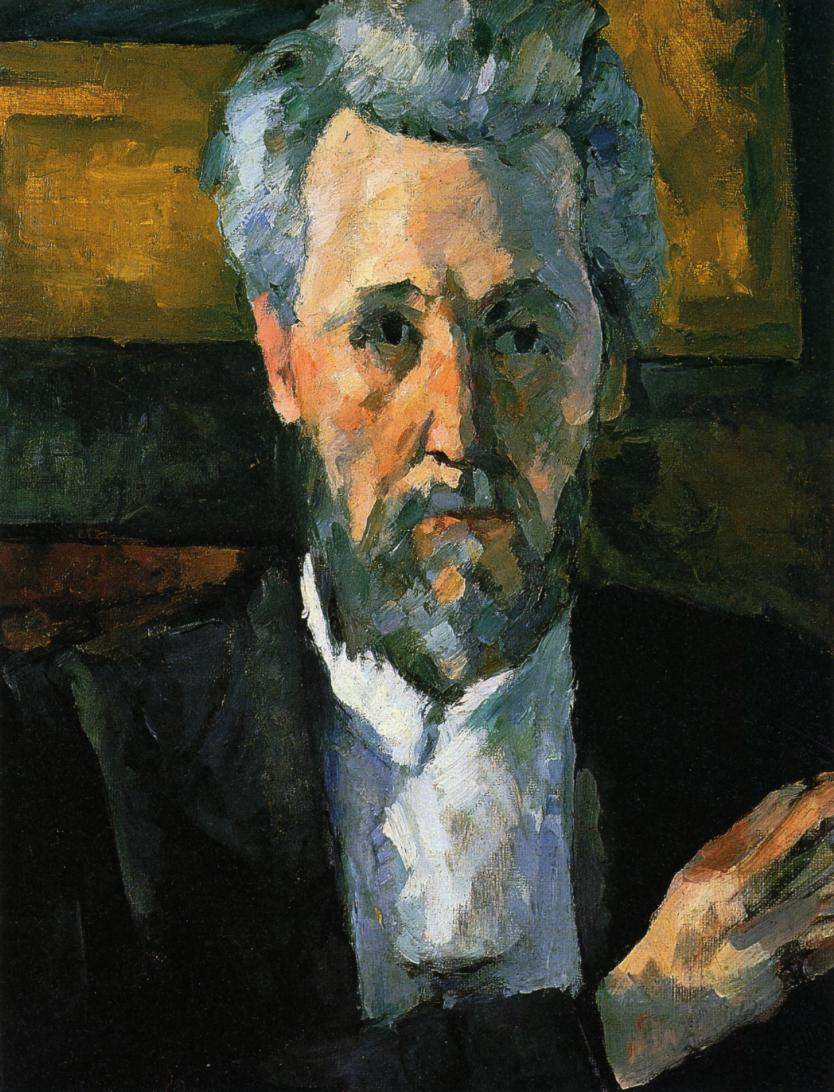
Paul Cézanne:
Portrait of Victor Chocquet

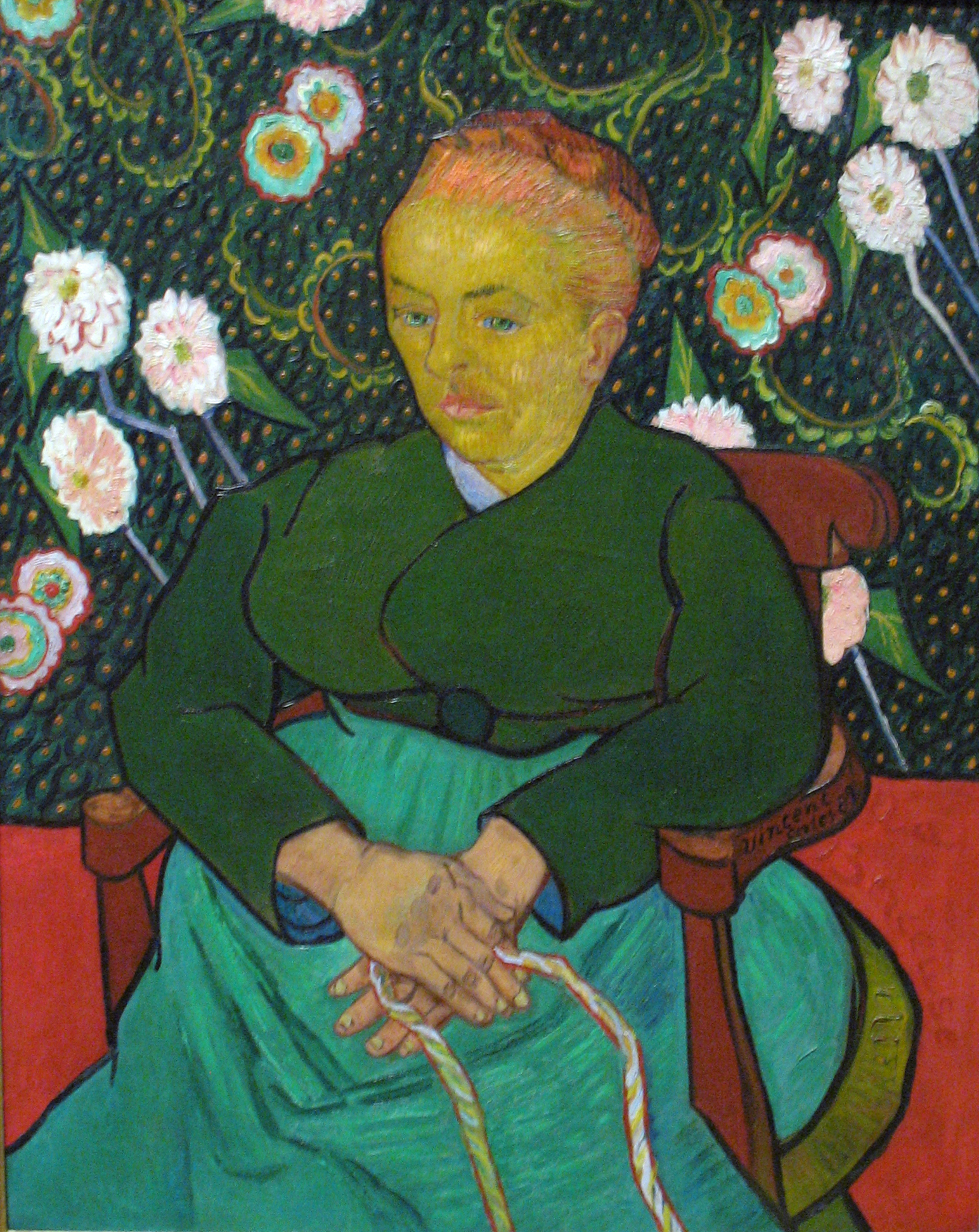
Vincent van Gogh:
La Berceuse

== Exhibitions ==
- Museo Nacional Centro de Arte Reina Sofía, Madrid, Spain, 17 March 2015-14 September 2015

== Sources ==
- Muller, Hans-Joachim (1990). Nafea: Die Sammlung Rudolf Staechelin, Basel (in French and German). Rudolf Staechelin'sche Familienstiftung (Rudolf Staechelin's Family Foundation). Basel: Wiese. ISBN 3909158528.
