= Ein Shams (film) =

- Directed by: Ibrahim El-Batout
- Screenplay by: Ibrahim El-Batout Tamer El Said
- Produced by: Ein Shams Films
- Starring: Hanan Youssef Ramadan Khater Hanan Adel Samar Abdel Wahab Mariam Abodouma
- Cinematography: Hesham Farouk Ibrahim
- Edited by: Ahmad Abdalla
- Music by: Amir Khalaf
- Release date: 2007
- Running time: 90 minutes
- Countries: Egypt; Morocco

Ein Shams is a 2007 film.

== Synopsis ==
From once being the capital of Egypt during the Pharaonic era and a sacred location marked by the visit of Jesus and the Virgin Mary, Ein Shams has become one of Cairo's poorest and most neglected neighbourhoods. Through the eyes of Shams, an eleven-year-old girl who lives in this neighbourhood, the film captures the sadness and magic that envelops everyday life in Egypt. In a series of heart-rending events, the diverse characters of the film showcase the intricacies of Egypt's political system and social structure, and give a glimpse into the grievances of the Middle East region and the complex relationships of its nations.

== Awards ==
- Taormina 2008
- Cine árabe Róterdam 2008
- Cartago 2008
