= Cruel Summer (2012 film) =

- Promotional poster
- Directed by: Kanye West; Alexandre Moors
- Written by: Kanye West; Elon Rutberg
- Story by: Kanye West; Elon Rutberg; Alexandre Moors
- Produced by: Jonathan Lia; Alex Rosenberg (Executive Producer); Amanda Palmer (Executive Producer)
- Starring: Scott Mescudi; Ali Suliman; Razane Jammal; Kanye West; Sean Anderson; Tauheed Epps; Hayat Al Fahad; Terrence Thornton; Chauncey Hollis Jr.; Benjamin Hudson; Teyana Taylor; Cydel Young; Aziz Ansari; Dalal Al Mansour
- Music by: Kanye West
- Distributed by: Donda; Island Def Jam; Doha Film Institute
- Release date: 2012
- Running time: 35 minutes

Cruel Summer is a short film written and directed by American rapper Kanye West that premiered at the Cannes Film Festival in 2012, and was shown out of competition.

A custom pyramid-shaped screening pavilion was constructed for the film's debut, designed by conceptual firms Donda, OMA and 2x4. The theater featured seven screens – three in the front, one on the floor, one on the ceiling and one on both the right and left side of the space. Cruel Summer was shot using a specialized camera rig, which allowed the directors to capture multiple angles simultaneously. This style of filming and screening a movie has since become known as the "Seven Screen Experience".

The film is inspired by the album of the same name by West's record label GOOD Music. It has been described as a "fusion of short film and art", with the Los Angeles Times raving Cruel Summer has a "thumping surround-sound quality that makes a 3-D Michael Bay effort feel like an iPad short."

== Synopsis ==
Rafi (Scott Mescudi), a high-end car thief, falls in love with a blind Arabian princess whose father (Ali Suliman) will only allow them to wed if he can pass a series of three challenges. Loosely based on old Arabian folk tales, the story culminates in a final challenge where Rafi must cure the Princess of her blindness in order to gain her companionship.

== Background ==
Emissaries of West's team, Executive Producer Alex Rosenberg and writer Elon Rutberg, traveled to Dubai, Abu Dhabi and Doha, Qatar in January 2012 to commence initial pre-production. They met with heads of state and prominent government officials, royalty, and private executives in each location to secure funding and shooting permits.

It later emerged that Cruel Summer would be exclusively shot in Doha, the capital city of Qatar. The project was produced in association with the Doha Film Institute, a cultural and film financing organization chaired by Al-Mayassa bint Hamad bin Khalifa Al-Thani, a member of Qatar's royal family and sister of the ruling emir, Sheikh Tamim bin Hamad Al Thani.

Sarah A., a first time Qatari actress played the female lead in Cruel Summer. Never before has a Qatari woman starred in a movie in the country's history.

Production of the film took place in mid-April, just one month before the movie's premiere during Cannes Film Festival. Post-production and editing subsequently occurred in New York City.

West described the seven-screen project as an attempt to "change entertainment experiences. Like if McQueen or Tarsem was to meet the entertainment value of Cirque du Soleil or Walt Disney."

It related to a post-Steve Jobs, post-Windows era, where we're always on our BlackBerry in a ball game or at the movies ... I was very particular about having the screens separate, where your mind puts the screens back together, the way you put memories together. I'm not the best director in the world, but I had an idea that I thought would be amazing to inspire people, like a dream of one day this being the way people watch movies. You know, Tarantino doing a movie like this or a horror movie like this, animation, 3-D ... in this form that surrounds you. People want to go back and see it more and more because they missed something to their left or to their right, and it feels more like the experience of life.

== Reviews ==
Cruel Summer received positive reviews. The Hollywood Reporter called the film "groundbreaking" and exclaimed "It turns out Kanye West didn't just want to make a short film – he wants to completely change the way movies are watched." The Los Angeles Times wrote the film has "new music from West and a thumping surround-sound quality that makes a 3-D Michael Bay effort feel like an iPad short." Rolling Stone commented the piece has "plenty of striking imagery" and praised West's "great visual sense".
