= The Fabulous Picture Show =

- Title card
- Presented by: Amanda Palmer

Production
- Production location: London

Original release
- Network: Al Jazeera English
- Release: November 2006 – 2011

The Fabulous Picture Show is a television series on Al Jazeera English dedicated to international films. It is presented by Al Jazeera entertainment editor Amanda Palmer. The show features reports and interviews with filmmakers and actors, with a focus on independent and international cinema. It also covers international film festivals around the world. FPS is presented from Everyman Cinema in London, where the featured guest has a dialogue with Palmer and answers questions from the audience after a screening of his/her film.

Palmer joined the yet-to-be-launched Al Jazeera English in 2005 to lead the channel's entertainment programming. She created two programs for the network: 48, focusing on travel and culture, and The Fabulous Picture Show. FPS launched in November 2006 alongside Al Jazeera English.
