= Tamer El Said =

Egyptian filmmaker (born 1972)

- Born: 14 August 1972 (age 53); Cairo, Egypt
- Occupation(s): Film director, producer, writer
- Years active: 1998–present

Tamer El Said (Arabic: تامر السعيد, born 1972) is an Egyptian filmmaker. He wrote, produced and directed numerous films including Take Me (2004), an award-winning documentary about five friends who unwittingly became political prisoners in Morocco, and the short film On a Monday (2005) on an old married couple who rediscover their relationship. His first fiction feature In the Last Days of the City was shot in Cairo, Berlin, Baghdad and Beirut and premiered in 2016 at the Berlin International Film Festival. He is co-founder of several independent initiatives in Cairo, including Cimatheque Alternative Film Centre, Mosireen, and Zero Production.

== Early life ==
Tamer El Said was born in August 1972 in Cairo, Egypt. His father Ahmed El Said wrote for the 70s famous children's radio program, A Song and A Tale. In spring 1991, El Said was detained for six weeks by State Security after participating in a students' strike in a demonstration against the participation of the Egyptian troops in the First Gulf War. He studied Film Directing at the High Institute of Cinema, graduating 1998 with Honourable Mention, and received his diploma in 2002.

After graduating, he worked for a couple of years as 1st AD on some of Egypt's bigger feature films, then spent a year directing high end commercials while teaching at both the High Institute of Cinema and the Actor's Studio in Cairo. In 2002 he took on the role of Senior Producer and Artistic Consultant for Nile Productions, moving across to Hot Spot in Dubai in 2003. His time as Senior Producer at Hot Spot saw the company expand dramatically, producing 250 documentaries in 58 countries, and winning several international awards.

== Career ==
Between 1994 and 2004, El Said wrote, produced and directed numerous award-winning shorts and documentaries including On a Monday (2004) and Take Me (2004). In 2006 he co-wrote the feature film Ein Shams (Eye of the Sun, 2008) with Ibrahim El Batout, and later started filming a long-term project about the village of Aytaroun which was destroyed in the 2006 war in Lebanon. In 2008, El Said began working on his first feature film In the Last Days of the City. Shot in Cairo, Baghdad, Beirut and Berlin, the film is on the lives of a group of friends from Egypt, Iraq and Lebanon have been shaped by their cities of birth and the instability of their region.

In 2007, El Said founded Zero Production, an independent production company in Cairo. Zero Production supports independent filmmakers in Cairo and the region whether directly producing, lending equipment or offering work space. El Said is currently in the process of setting up, with Khalid Abdalla and others, Cimatheque, an alternative film centre that aims to offer services and space to help develop and incubate the independent film movement in Cairo through building networks, sharing resources and building an infra-structure for the alternative film platform.

El-Said is member of National Culture Policy Group, an initiative launched in 2009, with the aim to propose a plan of action to better organise cultural endeavours in Egypt.

== Filmography ==
- In the Last Days of the City, Fiction, 118 min, 2016
- On a Monday, Fiction, 10 min, 2005
- Take Me, Documentary, 52 min, 2004
- Music of the nets, Documentary, 26 min, 2000
- Crisscross, Fiction, 20 min, 1998
- Like a feather, Fiction, 12 min, 1996
- Charlie, Fiction, 8 min, 1995
- 18 September, 12 min, 1994
- In the Last Days of the City (Akher Ayyam Al Madina)
- On a Monday (Yom al-Itneyn), short, 2005. Special Jury Award, Sakia Festival for Short Feature Films, Cairo 2005. Silver Hawk for short fiction, 5th Arab Film Festival, Rotterdam 2005. Best film “Faucon d’OR” at 22nd Kelibia International Independent Film Festival, Tunisia, 2005
- Take Me (Ghaeir Khodoni), Egypt/UAE, 2004, 53 min. 2004 Ismailia Film Festival Prize.

== Cimatheque ==
El Said co-founded Cimatheque, a multipurpose space dedicated to celebrating film and supporting the needs of independent filmmakers in Egypt. Built in the context of Egypt's emergent alternative cinema scene and a country in transition, it is conceived as a dynamic work space for independent filmmakers to collaborate, research and network, while addressing essential needs: education, screening and resources. Equipped with a screening room, viewing stations and a specialised library of films and books, Cimatheque aims to enable access to films rarely, if ever, shown in Egypt, featuring a rich variety of international films within a wider screening programme that gives essential exposure to Arab and Egyptian independent films.

Alongside this, Cimatheque provides a year-round educational programme of workshops and courses focusing on key issues like producing, screen-writing, editing and camera work, bringing together local and international filmmakers and industry professionals to exchange skills and experiences. Hosting an analogue film laboratory and accordant training programme, filmmakers are allowed to work with alternative methodologies and film material at affordable rates. Open to the public and filmmakers of all levels of experience, Cimatheque is planned to be a hub for filmmakers and film lovers alike, working to build a strong platform for alternative cinema in Egypt.

Apart from the screening facilities, the Cimatheque space is also planned to feature a cafeteria, workshop space, video library and a laboratory for hand processing and digitalising super 8mm and 16mm film.

== Mosireen ==
Together with Khalid Abdalla, Aida El Kashef, Lobna Darwish, Amr Gharbeia, and Omar Robert Hamilton, Tamer El Said founded Mosireen (means insisting/determined) which have created Tahrir Cinema, erected in the Tahrir square during the January 25th Egyptian revolution. With more members to join at later stages, including Salma El Tarzi, Salma Shamel, Mai Saad, Salma Said, Philip Rizk, Mostafa Bahgat, Jasmina Metwaly, and Sherief Gaber; Mosireen became a 10-member Anarchist revolutionary media collective, located in Downtown Cairo with the aim of supporting all kinds of media. Tahrir Cinema featured a daily set of screenings, mainly of raw footage of the revolution, using a projector it brought material to mass audiences, in the place that is the heart of the revolution.
