= Winter of Discontent (film) =

2013 film

- Directed by: Ibrahim El Batout
- Written by: Ahmed Amer; Ibrahim El-Batout; Yasser Naeim
- Produced by: Ibrahim El Batout
- Starring: Salah Hanafy
- Cinematography: Victor Credi
- Release date: 1 September 2012 (Venice)
- Running time: 96 minutes
- Country: Egypt
- Language: Arabic

Winter of Discontent (Arabic: الشتا إللى فات; translit. El sheita elli fat) is a 2012 Egyptian drama film directed by Ibrahim El Batout. The film was selected as the Egyptian entry for the Best Foreign Language Film at the 86th Academy Awards, but it was not nominated.

== Cast ==
- Salah Hanafy
- Moataz Mosallam as Moataz
- Amr Waked
- Farah Youssef

== See also ==
- List of submissions to the 86th Academy Awards for Best Foreign Language Film
- List of Egyptian submissions for the Academy Award for Best Foreign Language Film
