= White Center (Yellow, Pink and Lavender on Rose) =

1950 painting by Mark Rothko

- Artist: Mark Rothko
- Year: 1950
- Dimensions: 205.8 cm × 141 cm (81.0 in × 56 in)
- Location: The royal family of Qatar

White Center (Yellow, Pink and Lavender on Rose) is an abstract painting by Mark Rothko completed in 1950.

== Description ==
White Center is part of Rothko's distinctive multiform style: several blocks of layered, complementary colors on a large canvas.

The painting is structured vertically, starting with a yellow horizontal rectangle at the top, a black horizontal strip, a narrow white rectangular band and the bottom half is lavender. The top half of the rose ground is deeper in colour and the bottom half is pale. It measures 205.8 × 141 cm.

== 2007 sale ==
The painting was bought in 1960 by Eliza Bliss Parkinson (the niece of Lillie P. Bliss, one of the founders of the Museum of Modern Art) from the Sidney Janis Gallery, New York before being bought in June 1960 by David Rockefeller.

The work was sold in May 2007 by Sotheby's on behalf of David Rockefeller to the royal family of Qatar; Sheikh Hamad bin Khalifa Al-Thani, and his wife, Mozah bint Nasser Al Missned. The painting sold for 72.84 million (USD), then setting the record of the current most expensive post-war work of art sold at auction.

== See also ==
- List of most expensive paintings
