= Al-Hawi, Hadhramaut =

Al-Hawi
- Interactive map of Al-Hawi
- Coordinates: 15.917°N 48.671°E
- Country: Yemen
- Governorate: Hadhramaut Governorate
- Time zone: UTC+3 (Yemen Standard Time)

Al-Hawi is a village in eastern Yemen. It is located in the Hadhramaut Governorate.
