= Doha Film Institute =

Not-for-profit cultural organisation in Doha, Qatar

- مؤسسة الدوحة للأفلام
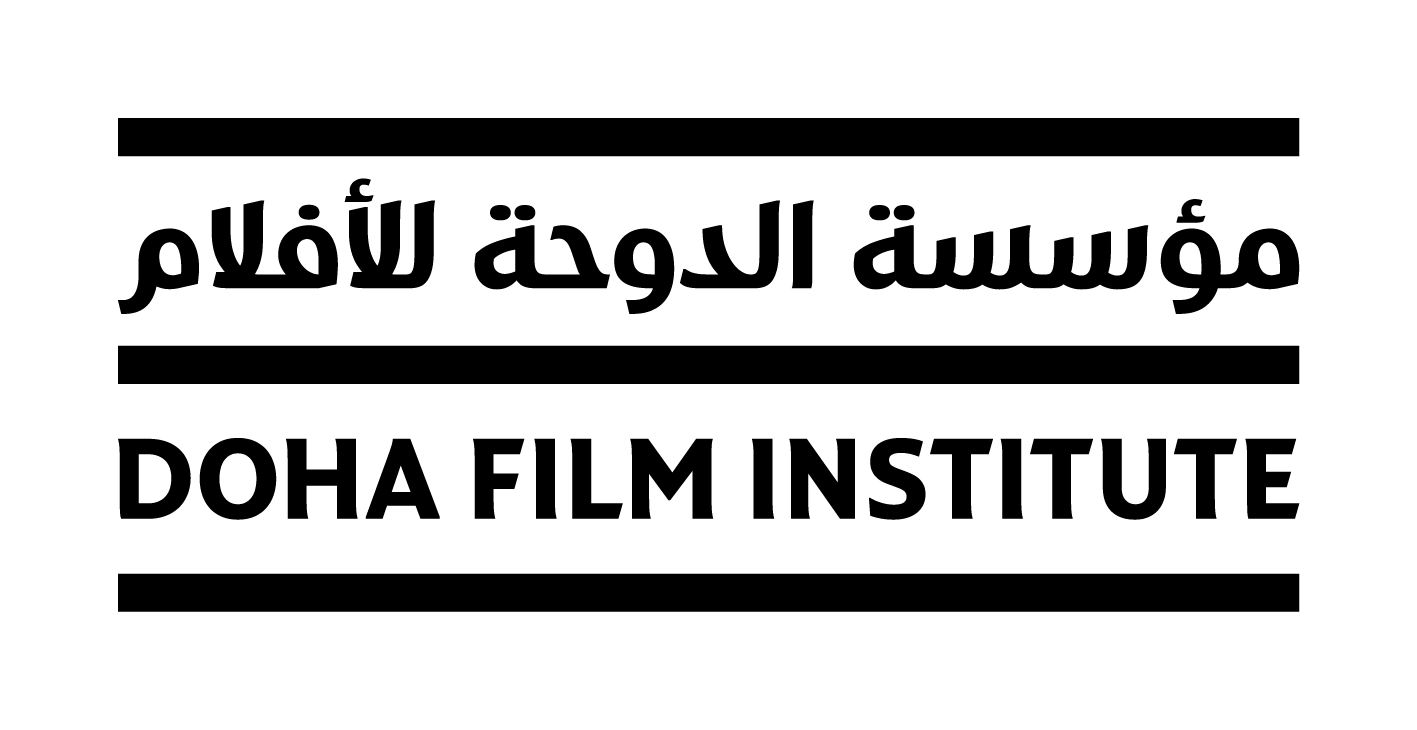
- Doha Film Institute logo
- Formation: 2010
- Founder: Al-Mayassa bint Hamad bin Khalifa Al-Thani
- Type: Nonprofit
- Location: Doha, Qatar
- Services: Film mentorship, funding, film festivals
- CEO: Amanda Palmer (2010-2012); Abdulaziz Al-Khater (2012-2014); Fatma Al Remaihi (2014-present)
- Funding: Government funding
- Website: www.dohafilminstitute.com

Doha Film Institute (DFI) is a nonprofit cultural organisation established in 2010 by Sheikha Al-Mayassa bint Hamad bin Khalifa Al-Thani to support the growth of the Qatari film community and to provide funding and international networking opportunities to creators. DFI hosts two major film festivals, Ajyal Film Festival and Qumra, each year. Since its inception, DFI has financially supported more than 600 projects from development through post-production.

== History ==
Sheikha Al-Mayassa bint Hamad bin Khalifa Al-Thani founded DFI in 2010 to support the Arab film industry, especially in Qatar, as well as creators abroad. In support of the organisation's mission, Al Remaihi, CEO of DFI beginning in 2014, said: "I believe that film as a medium is strongly related to the rich storytelling tradition of the Arab world." Sheikha Al-Mayassa remains involved by being a chairperson for the organisation. Amanda Palmer was DFI's first CEO until stepping down in July 2012 to start a talent and production company. DFI board member Mansour Ibrahim Al-Mahmoud served as acting CEO until banking executive Abdulaziz Al-Khater became CEO that October. Under Al-Khater, DFI split from its partnership with the Tribeca Film Festival, thus ending the Doha Tribeca Film Festival (DTFF). The organisation also saw major reductions in both cultural activities and staffing due to financial problems. The Ajyal Film Festival (2013) and Qumra Film Festival (2014) were launched to replace the DTFF. Fatma Al Remaihi became Acting CEO in August 2014 following his resignation, and permanent CEO in December. Al Remaihi joined DFI in 2009 and was cultural advisor to the first DTFF, as well as DFI's Director of Programmes. In May 2022, she received the Ordre des Arts et des Lettres award from the French government in recognition of her work with DFI.

=== Collaborators ===
In 2012, students from Northwestern University in Qatar (NU-Q) were invited to create short films for the Made in Qatar segment of the DTFF. NU-Q faculty, such as Joe F. Khalil, Tim Wilkerson, Khaled Hroub, Justin Martin, and Scott Curtis, led discussions and panels at the event. In 2013, DFI announced the creation of a $100 million feature film fund in collaboration with Jeffrey Skoll's production company Participant Media though no films were supported and the fund was later cancelled. In 2019, DFI collaborated with the Mumbai Academy of the Moving Image to host the Qatar-India Year of Culture event. In 2022, to celebrate the FIFA World Cup being held in Qatar, DFI and the Qatar Football Association started the Football Filmmaking Challenge, which invited creators ages 18 to 25 to make short films about football.

== Programmes ==
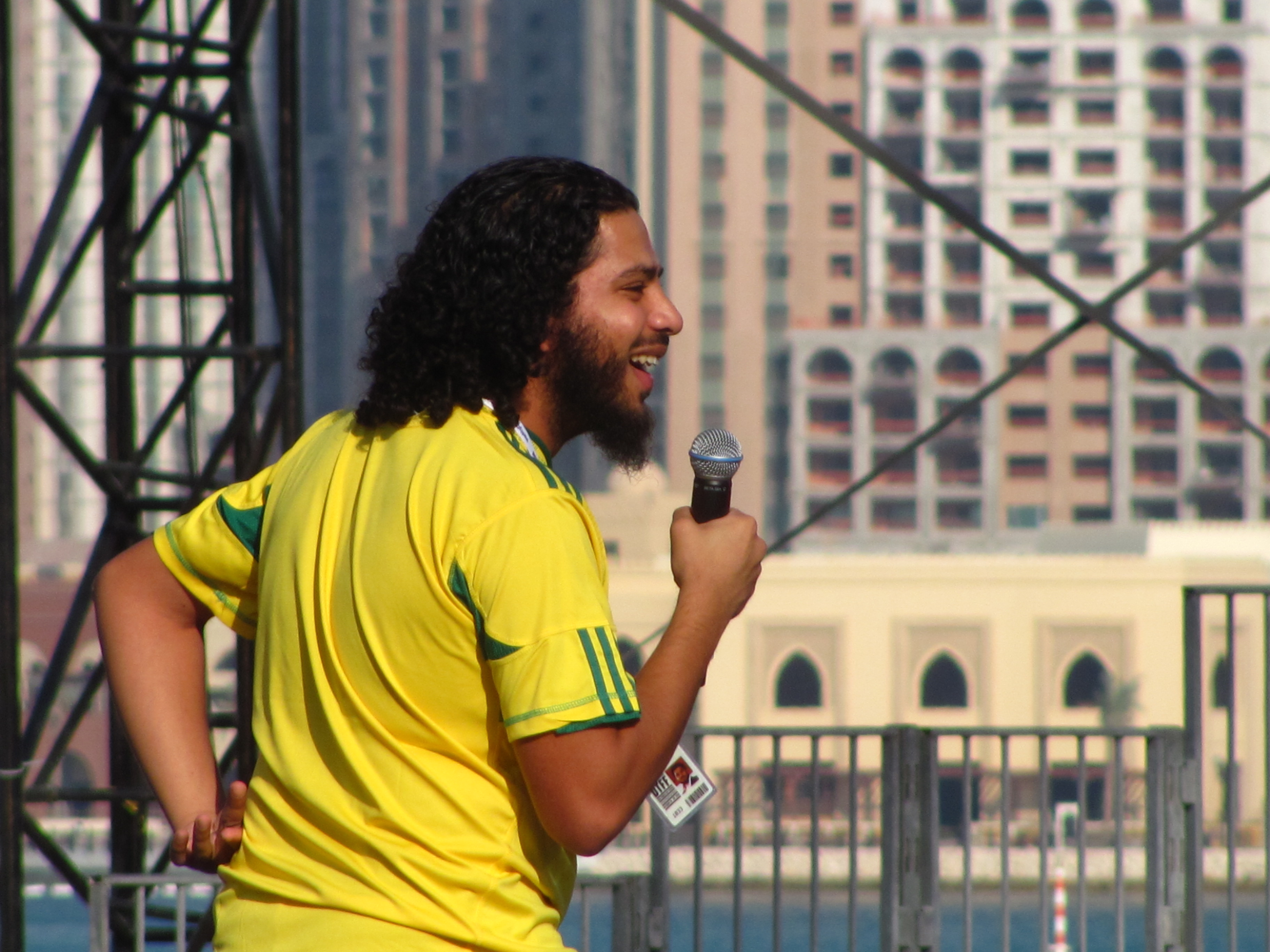
Comedian Hilal Bilal performing at the 2010 DTFF

=== Doha Tribeca Film Festival (2009-2012) ===
In 2009, a pre-launched DFI teamed up with Tribeca Enterprises to start the Doha Tribeca Film Festival. Then-CEO Amanda Palmer was program director for the first three festivals. This festival aimed to continue developing Qatar's film industry. The Made in Qatar series present at the DTFF was later shifted to the Ajyal Film Festival. The session at the 2012 DTFF saw the largest number of films yet presented in this series, including 15 world premieres. The final edition of the festival took place over eight days in 2012 just prior the partnership between the two organisations ending following Palmer's departure from DFI and its replacement with the Ajyal and Qumra festivals under Al-Khater.

=== Ajyal Film Festival (2013-2024) ===
The Ajyal Film Festival was launched in November 2013 to showcase family-friendly films from around the world "designed to nurture minds across generations and support the development of thoughtful future leaders." Ajyal took place over six or seven days in October or November each year. Ajyal ran as a festival until 2024. Since 2025, its youth jury continued as the Ajyal Film Competition within the Doha Film Festival. Amid shutdowns and increased safety measures due to the COVID-19 pandemic, the 2021 edition was conducted in a hybrid format with both online and in-person film screenings. The festival was unique in that its film jury consists of DFI members between ages 8 and 25 who take part in post-viewing discussions and vote for each year's winning films. Those chosen by the jury were given funding for their next film. Jurors themselves were divided into three groups: Mohaq (ages 8–12), Hilal (ages 13–17), and Bader (ages 18–25). In 2021, more than 500 jurors from more than 40 countries participated. In addition to evaluating each film in general, the jury looked specifically at how the film's message can "bring about social change." Ajyal had annual themes as well that lend inspiration to its filmmakers. The 2021 theme was "Press Play," which focused on "mov[ing] forward out of pause mode and rekindl[ing] people's passion for play, exploration, and discovery through shared cultural experiences." The festival also had a Made in Qatar session that showcases short films by Qatari creators. In 2020, Made in Qatar was held drive-in style in Lusail. In addition to the film screenings, Ajyal hosted several special events, including exhibitions, concerts, workshops, installations, live performances, panels, and family activities during the festival.

=== Qumra (2014-present) ===
The Qumra film platform started in March 2014 as a way to showcase up-and-coming filmmakers. In addition to screenings, the festival holds masterclasses and discussions with industry professionals who help guide new filmmakers to making the content of their film internationally accessible. Since its inception, Qumra has evolved beyond the event itself into an "online portal, digital event space, and resource hub, and a unique incubator intended to assist first- and second-time filmmakers from around the world." After being held online from 2020-2022, the 2023 Qumra Film Festival was held in person again and featured 44 films of which 13 were from Qatar itself. The 2026 edition was held online because of the Iran war, with 49 projects from 39 countries participating.

=== Focus on Qatar (2015-2016) ===
Focus on Qatar was a 3-day festival meant to showcased films and filmmakers from Qatar. The festival was held at the MIA, featured over 15 short movies and was opened with a screening of Clockwise, which was Qatars first feature-length movie. The festival was held again in 2016 and showcased seven short documentaries by Qatari filmmakers at the MIA.

=== Ajyal Film Club (2021-present) ===
In 2021, the youth jurors from the Ajyal Film Festival started the free-to-join Ajyal Film Club for people ages eight to 25. Following a viewing of the selected films, which are available on at least one popular streaming platform for accessibility, jurors discuss the films. The club was established to "put the spotlight on pressing global concerns and rally youth dialogue around them through the medium of film." Previous topics include environmental concerns seen through the lenses of The Lorax, Chasing Coral, and Nausicaä of the Valley of the Wind, and the Israeli–Palestinian conflict with a focus on Palestine through The Present, My Neighbourhood, and 200 Meters.

=== Doha Film Festival (2025) ===
The inaugural Doha Film Festival (DFF) was held from 20 to 28 November 2025. Its programme comprises the International Feature Film Competition, International Short Film Competition, Ajyal Film Competition, and Made in Qatar Competition. The DFF 2025 was made up of 97 films from 62 countries, of which 49 were premiers in the MENA region, and four were world premiers. From the films presented, 24 were supported by the DFI and a majority were directed by women. Prizes at the festival totaled more than $300,000 for all four categories.

=== Other ===
In addition to its film festivals, DFI hosts workshops, labs, and masterclasses for creators, including courses focused on screenwriting and producing. Classes are mentored by industry professionals such as Annemarie Jacir, Fx Goby, Patrick Doyle, Richard Peña, Julie Goldman, Ghassan Salhab, Sebastián Sepúlveda, Ahmad Abdalla, Hisham Zaman, Rithy Panh, Kamal Aljafari, Marietta von Hausswolff von Baumgarten, and Ryan O'Nan, who can help students move through the steps of film creation, from screenwriting and development to post-production and marketing. Other events include Cinema Under the Stars, family-friendly outdoor film screenings. In 2025, DFI announced vocational training programmes in a partnership with La Fémis and Gobelins Paris for 2026.

=== Doha Film Festival (2026) ===
The 2026 edition of the festival will be held from 19 November to 27 in the Qatari capital Doha. Yemeni-Scottish film director Sara Ishaq's comedy-drama film The Station will open the revamped festival.

== Funding programmes ==
The DFI Grants program biannually awards creators with funding in both the spring and fall, aiming to "support initiative that identifies and nurtures first- and second-time filmmakers globally." As of 2026, DFI has given financing to more than 1,000 projects. Funding is granted through two arms: the DFI Grants Programme, which "provides development, production and post-production funding to filmmakers from Qatar" and new filmmakers globally, and the Doha Film Institute Co-Financing programme, which "invests in film production through strategic partnerships with film projects." In 2020, DFI announced it would be funding a television show, Oddity Tales from a Strange Land, for the first time. The same year, about half of the spring grants were given to women directors. In 2022, ten films funded at least partially by DFI were chosen for that year's Cannes Film Festival. Backstage, one of the five DFI backed movies shown at 80th Venice Film Festival in 2023, won the Cinema & Arts award, while at the Cannes Film Festival the same year, the lead actress of another DFI backed film, About Dry Grasses, was awarded the Best Actress award. At the 2024 Cannes Film Festival, six DFI-backed movies were shown. 12 DFI-supported films and projects were selected for the 2025 Venice Film Festival. At the 2026 Berlinale, five DFI-supported films were selected and seven were selected for the 2026 Cannes Film Festival.

Examples of films financed or co-financed by the DFI are Theeb, Loving Vincent, The Prophet, The Reluctant Fundamentalist, The Salesman, Black Gold, Kanye West's Cruel Summer, The Attack, Capernaum, It Must Be Heaven, and Of Fathers and Sons.

On 18 February 2024, DFI announced a short film event, featuring films produced by local directors, under “The Made in Qatar Film Competition” banner. The two day competition began 20 February, with the awards being presented the next day. The event was open to the general public for four days following the announcement of the winners.
