= Ibrahim El Batout =

Egyptian filmmaker

- Born: 20 September 1963. Port Said
- Citizenship: Egypt
- Occupation: filmmaker
- Honours: 1991:Honorary Award TBS for the coverage of the first Gulf War

Ibrahim El Batout (Arabic: إبراهيم البطوط) is an Egyptian filmmaker, based in Cairo, Egypt. Born in Port Said on 20 September 1963.

He has worked as a director, producer and cameraman capturing stories mainly about human loss, suffering, and displacement since 1987. He has directed numerous documentaries for international TV channels, such as ZDF, TBS, and ARTE. His documentary work has been honored by the Rory Peck Trust (2003), and has received the Axel Springer Award in Germany (1994 and 2000). As well as that his drama Ein Shams took home the Golden Bull, the top prize at the 54th Taormina Film Festival, 2008.

== Ein Shams (The Eye of the Sun) ==
- Script Tamer El Said and Ibrahim El Batout
- Camera Hesham Farouk Ibrahim
- Editor Ahmed Abdalah
- Music Amir Khalaf
- Sound Mohab Mostafa Ezz
- Art Director Shaima Aziz
- Production and Sales Sherif Mandour
- Cast Hanan Youssef, Boutros Boutros Ghaly, Ramadan Khater, Hanan Adel, Samar Abdelwahab, Mariam Abodouma

Synopsis From once being the capital of Egypt during the Pharaonic era and a sacred location marked by the visit of Jesus and the Virgin Mary, Ein Shams has become one of Cairo's poorest and most neglected neighbourhoods. Through the eyes of Shams, an eleven-year-old girl inhabitant of this neighborhood, the film captures the sadness and magic that envelops everyday life in Egypt. In a series of heart-rending events, the diverse characters of the film showcase the intricacies of Egypt's political system and social structure, and give a glimpse into the grievances of the Middle East region and the complex relationships of its nations.

== Feature films ==
- 2005 Ithaki (D.O.P., Producer, Writer, Director)
- 2008 Ein Shams, The Eye of the Sun (Writer and Director)
- 2010 Hawi (Writer, Director, Producer and DP)
- 2012 Winter of Discontent

== Selected documentaries ==
- 1996 Slavery in Southern Sudan (ZDF)
- 1998 The Beginning of the War in Kosovo (ZDF)
- 1999 The War in Kosovo (ZDF)
- 1999 Nagib Mahfouz: Passage du siecle (ARTE)
- 2000 A Day of an Ambulance Driver in Ramalla, Palestine (ZDF)
- 2001 Three German Women Living in Gaza (WDR Germany)
- 2001 The River that Connects Future EC Countries (ZDF)
- 2002 Pilgrimage to Mecca (ZDF)
- 2002 Drug Addiction in Kuwait (ZDF)
- 2003 Mass Graves in Iraq (ZDF)
- 2004 Baghdad (ZDF)
- 2006 26 Seconds in Pakistan (Islamic Relief Foundation)
- 2007 I am a Refugee in Cairo (Al Jazeera International)

== Awards and honors ==
- 1991:Honorary Award TBS for the coverage of the first Gulf War
- 1994 Axel Springer Award for Female Circumcision in Ethiopia
- 1996 ECHO for The Victim of a War that Ended
- 2000 Axel Springer Award for A Day of an Ambulance Driver in Ramalla
- 2003 Rory Peck Sony International Impact Award Finalist for Mass Graves in Iraq
- 2008 The Golden Tauro at the Taormina Film Festival for Ein Shams
- 2008 The Best First Film Award in Rotterdam Arab Film Festival for Ein Shams
- 2008 Special Jury Mention in Cathage International film Festival For Ein Shams ( Eye of the Sun )
- 2010 Best Arab Film Award Doha Tribeca Film Festival for Hawi
- 2011 The Jury Award Rabat International Film Festival for Hawi
- 2011 Best Film Award Beirut International Film Festival for Hawi
- 2011 Best Screen Play Beirut International Film Festival for Hawi
- 2011 Honorable mention San Francisco Arab Film Festival for Hawi

== External links and references ==
- Ithaki blogspot (Arabic)
- Article about Ibrahim EL Batout in Al-Ahram Weekly (English)
- Article about Ithaki by Joseph Fahim (English)
- Article about Ein Shams by Joseph Fahim (English)
- Article in Al Hayat (Arabic)
- The Rory Peck Awards 2003
- http://www.iloubnan.info/en/detail/16/67528
