= Press line =

Area where members of the media cover an event

Examples of press lines at a film festival (2024)

The term press line typically refers to an area or a setup where members of the media, such as journalists, photographers, and camera operators, are stationed to cover an event. This is often seen at events such as: movie premieres, award shows, product launches, or any public or private event where there is media interest. In these settings, celebrities, VIPs, or event participants walk along a designated path (the “line”) and stop at various points to talk to the press, pose for photos, or give interviews.

This arrangement provides an organized way for the media to get access to the individuals of interest, and ensures that multiple media outlets can cover the event efficiently. The press line is often marked or cordoned off, and is managed by event organizers to maintain order and direct the flow of interactions. Typically, photographers are first and journalists are second.

Before a press line begins, members of the media are typically given a "face sheet." This tool aids journalists and photographers in identifying the individuals they intend to photograph or interview. The face sheet, which can be distributed as a pre-event PDF, or as a printed handout at the press line, is an essential resource for the attending press.
