= The Film House =

- Type: Private
- Headquarters: Doha, Qatar
- Key people: Justin Kramer (CEO)
- Website: www.thefilmhouse.tv

The Film House is a creative film and commercials production company based in Doha, Qatar. Founded in 2012 by Justin Kramer and Omar Khalifa, it specialises in content creation, media development and film production for clients in Qatar and internationally, with an international team of filmmakers, writers, artists and production technicians.

Its services concept development, scriptwriting, live-action production, hybrid production and sound recording, alongside post-production disciplines including editing, motion graphics, visual effects, sound mixing and colour grading. Its work spans social and digital content, television advertising, cinema, festival films, digital signage and public art installations. The company combines creative development with production and post-production, adapting its services to different formats, project requirements and budgets. According to its published company profile, its productions have taken it to every continent.

== Clients ==
The company's published client portfolio includes organisations in broadcasting, technology, sport, fashion, automotive manufacturing, hospitality and Qatar's cultural and public sectors. The names shown in its client portfolio are listed below as examples.

Sector	Clients listed by The Film House
Airlines and tourism	Qatar Airways, AirAsia, Qatar Tourism Authority, Lonely Planet
Media and technology	Netflix, TikTok, Apple, BBC, Samsung, VICE, PBS, CNN, Al Jazeera, The New York Times
Sport and fashion	FIFA, Qatar Football Association, Levi's, Puma, Burberry, New Balance, Gap, DAZED
Automotive	Lexus, Land Rover, Chevrolet
Telecommunications	Vodafone, Ooredoo
Culture and education	Qatar Museums, Qatar Foundation
Hospitality, property and transport	Accor, Mondrian Doha, Mondrian Shoreditch, SLS Dubai, Qatari Diar, Doha Metro
Financial services and consumer brands	Standard Chartered, Red Bull, Air Wick

== Film and Television ==
The Film House has produced numerous short films. The first of which was Kashta (2016), a short film written and directed by A. J. Al Thani and supported by the Doha Film Institute. The film screened in the Made in Qatar programme at the Ajyal Youth Film Festival. The company also worked with artist Sophia Al-Maria on Black Friday, a video and installation shown at the Whitney Museum of American Art in New York in 2016, and worked on the Qatar portions of the BBC drama series McMafia (2018).

In 2024, the company provided local production services for a Qatar Airways in-flight safety film directed by Tim Story and starring Kevin Hart.

In 2025, Deadline reported that the company had established The Film House Originals with support from Media City Qatar. Its initial slate included Jodari Meno, a documentary directed by Jamal Al Khanji about his attempt to catch a world-record dogtooth tuna. The film, backed by The Film House Originals and several partners, was selected for a world premiere in the Special Screenings programme of the 2026 Doha Film Festival.

== Awards ==
The Film House’s website lists recognition from awards programmes including the MarCom Awards, New York Festivals, Dubai Lynx, Cresta Awards, Lisbon Advertising Awards, Hermes Creative Awards, Telly Awards and Loeries. The website presents these programmes collectively as recognition for its films.

At the 2015 Cannes Corporate Media & TV Awards, two Film House productions received Silver Dolphins. Definitely Able Voices, made for British Council Qatar, won in the Sponsoring, Non-profit, Corporate Social Responsibility category. The Master Craftsman – Anvil Rooms won in the Corporate Videos category.

At the 2025 Doha Film Festival, Justin Kramer’s short Fahad the Furious won Best Film in the Made in Qatar competition. Rashid Al Sheeb received the Abdulaziz Jassim Award for Best Performance for his role in the film.
