= Al-Mayassa bint Hamad Al Thani =

Qatari sheikha

Al-Mayassa bint Hamad bin Khalifa Al Thani
- Born: 29 September 1983 (age 43); Geneva, Switzerland
- Spouse: Jassim bin Abdulaziz Al Thani (m. 2006)
- Issue: Mohammed bin Jassim Al Thani; Hamad bin Jassim Al Thani; Abdulaziz bin Jassim Al Thani; Norah bint Jassim Al Thani; Tamim bin Jassim Al Thani
Names
- Al-Mayassa bint Hamad bin Khalifa Al Thani
- House: Thani
- Father: Hamad bin Khalifa Al Thani
- Mother: Moza bint Nasser al-Misnad
- Occupation: Founder and chairperson, Qatar Museums and Doha Film Institute; Vice chair, Education Above All; Council member, Museum of Contemporary Art, Los Angeles and The Guggenheim; Independent director, Soho House

Al-Mayassa bint Hamad bin Khalifa Al Thani (Arabic: المياسة بنت حمد بن خليفة آل ثاني; born 29 September 1983) is the sister of Qatar's ruling Emir Tamim bin Hamad Al Thani, and daughter of the country's former Emir Hamad bin Khalifa Al Thani and his second wife Sheikha Moza bint Nasser al-Misnad. Al-Mayassa was listed as the most influential person in art on Art+Auction's top-10 list and ArtReview's Power 100, and appears on the Time 100, and Forbes' The World's 100 Most Powerful Women. She was listed in the 'Top 100 most powerful Arabs' from 2014 to 2017, as well as in 2021, by Gulf Business. Al-Mayassa serves as Chairperson of Qatar Museums, and it was reported by Bloomberg that her annual acquisition budget on behalf of the organization is estimated at $1 billion.

Al-Mayassa reportedly bought Paul Gauguin's When Will You Marry? in 2015 for $300 million, a record price for a painting. In March 2016, she opened What About the Art?, a new exhibition curated by Chinese artist Cai Guo-Qiang, at Al Riwaq Gallery. Qatar has bought Cezanne's The Card Players in 2012 for $250 million, as well as Mark Rothko's White Center (Yellow, Pink and Lavender on Rose) in 2007 for $70 million, a Damien Hirst pill cabinet for $20 million and works by Jeff Koons, Andy Warhol, Roy Lichtenstein and Francis Bacon. She has staged major exhibitions in Qatar with Takashi Murakami, Richard Serra, and Damien Hirst.

== Education ==
Sheikha al-Mayassa graduated with a B.A. degree in political science and literature from Duke University (Durham, North Carolina, USA) in 2005.

During the 2003–2004 school year, she studied at the University of Paris 1 Pantheon-Sorbonne, and the Institut d'Études Politiques de Paris (known as Sciences Po).

== Career ==
Upon graduation, Sheikha al-Mayassa established the NGO Reach Out To Asia. This organization is a philanthropic effort inspired by the desire to help the victims of recent natural disasters in Asia by providing quality education; it also celebrated the occasion of the 2006 Asian Games in Doha.

Sheikha al-Mayassa is the chairperson of Qatar Museums is responsible for cultivating significant cultural events in the region. She has been profiled extensively in The New York Times.

Sheikha al-Mayassa is chairperson of the Doha Film Institute (DFI), which she founded in 2010. The institute partnered with the Tribeca Film Festival to produce several annual iterations of the Doha Tribeca Film Festival. In February 2013, they announced a $100 million feature film fund with Participant Media, a production company founded by billionaire Jeffrey Skoll, who was the first employee and first president of internet auction firm eBay.

Fashion Trust Arabia (FTA) launched in September 2018 under the patronage of Sheikha Moza bint Nasser as honorary chair and co-chaired by Sheikha al-Mayassa and Tania Fares (Founder of Fashion Trust). FTA is the only initiative of its kind operating in the Arab world, dedicated to finding and nurturing talented designers. She is a member of the board of trustees at Qatar Foundation. In 2018, she was named to a three-year term on the Rhode Island School of Design board of trustees.

In 2021, she became vice chairman of the Education Above All Foundation and an independent director of Soho House.

She is a member of the Leadership Council of The Democracy & Culture Foundation.

In April 2023, Sheikha al-Mayassa was a speaker at the "Art for Tomorrow" conference in Italy, organized by the Democracy & Culture Foundation in collaboration with The New York Times.

In December 2023, she launched her podcast, "The Power of Culture", which focuses on the cultural scene in Qatar.

She is a member of the environmental council of the Museum of Contemporary Art, Los Angeles and of the collections council at The Guggenheim Museum.

== Art collecting ==
Sheikha al-Mayassa's wealth and role as Chairperson of Qatar Museums make her influential among art collectors. Bloomberg reported her acquisition budget on behalf of Qatar Museums is estimated at $1 billion annually.

Sheikha al-Mayassa is said to have purchased the most expensive painting in the world, Paul Gauguin's When Will You Marry? in 2015 for $300 million, Cezanne's The Card Players in 2012 for $250 million, as well as Mark Rothko's White Center (Yellow, Pink and Lavender on Rose) in 2007 for $70 million, a Damien Hirst pill cabinet for $20 million and works by Jeff Koons, Andy Warhol, Roy Lichtenstein and Francis Bacon. She has staged major exhibitions in Qatar with Takashi Murakami, Richard Serra, and Damien Hirst (underwriting his exhibit first at the Tate Modern prior to opening in Doha). The Sheikha oversees a vast array of museums including the I. M. Pei-designed Museum of Islamic Art, Doha, which opened in November 2008, and the Jean Nouvel-designed National Museum of Qatar, which opened in March 2019. The Orientalist Museum by Herzog & de Meuron is slated to open in the coming year.

Sheikha al-Mayassa participated in a TED Talk in February 2012, where she highlighted the importance of the social impact of art. She affirmed that her goal was to create a local collection of art to contribute in shaping the Qatari national identity.

== Controversies ==
In 2019 Sheikha al-Mayassa and her husband were sued by three British and American workers who claimed that they had made them work long hours without overtime. Both Sheikha al-Mayassa and her husband denied this and settled without admission of liability.

== Family ==
Sheikha Mayassa is the sister of the Emir of Qatar, Sheikh Tamim bin Hamad Al Thani. Her father Sheikh Hamad bin Khalifa Al-Thani is the former Emir.

Sheikha Mayassa's mother Sheikha Moza bint Nasser is responsible for opening campuses of several world-class academic institutions in Doha, including Virginia Commonwealth University, Carnegie Mellon University, Georgetown University, Northwestern University, Texas A&M University and Weill Cornell Medical College and the University of Calgary in Qatar.

Her brother Sheikh Mohammed bin Hamad Al Thani is the Chairman of Qatar's winning bid to stage the 2022 FIFA World Cup in Doha.

Sheikha al-Mayassa's father former Emir of Qatar from 1995 to 2013, Sheikh Hamad bin Khalifa Al Thani, established the Qatar Investment Authority, a sovereign wealth fund to manage the country's oil and natural gas surpluses. The Qatar Investment Authority and its subsidiaries have acquired many businesses abroad, including London's department store Harrods from entrepreneur Mohammed Al-Fayed, Paris based department store Printemps, a 75% stake in film studio Miramax, a 2% stake in media conglomerate and Universal Music Group parent company Vivendi, a 1% stake in luxury goods manufacturer Louis Vuitton Moët Hennessy and several other major companies.

=== Marriage and children ===
Sheikha al-Mayassa married Sheikh Jassim bin Abdulaziz Al Thani at Al-Wajbah Palace, Doha, on 6 January 2006. Sheikh Jassim is an elder son of Sheikh Abdul Aziz bin Jassim bin Hamad Al Thani, making them second cousins. Together they have four sons and one daughter.

- Sheikh Mohammed bin Jassim bin Abdulaziz Al Thani.
- Sheikh Hamad bin Jassim bin Abdulaziz Al Thani.
- Sheikh Abdulaziz bin Jassim bin Abdulaziz Al Thani.
- Sheikha Norah bint Jassim bin Abdulaziz Al Thani
- Sheikh Tamim bin Jassim bin Abdulaziz Al Thani.
