= Hawi (film) =

- Directed by: Ibrahim El Batout
- Screenplay by: Ibrahim El Batout
- Produced by: Hossam Elouan; Ibrahim El Batout, Ein Shams Films
- Starring: Hanan Youssef, Sherif El Dessouki, Mohamed El Sayed, Fady Iskandar
- Cinematography: Ibrahim El Batout
- Edited by: Perry Moataz
- Music by: Massar Egbary
- Release date: 2010
- Running time: 112'
- Countries: Egypt; Qatar
- Language: Arabic
- Budget: EGP1,000,000

Hawi (Arabic: هاوي, romanized: Hāwī) is a 2010 Egyptian film directed by Ibrahim El Batout, starred by Mohamed El Sayed, Sherif El Dessouki and Mirette El Hariri.

Shot in Alexandria using non-professional actors and a volunteer crew, the film is inspired by the alternative cinema of Jean-Luc Godard, Dziga Vertov and Abbas Kiarostami.

== Synopsis ==
Youssef, Ibrahim and Fady spent 20 years in the same prison. Youssef has just been released in order to find several confidential documents. After 20 years, Ibrahim wants to see his daughter again. She is rehearsing with the third man, Fady, the musician. Apart from these three men, in The Juggler, we will also meet an old horseman who hopes to heal his beloved animal and a TV presenter who needs a guest for his show. They are all looking for someone or something in this kaleidoscopic portrait of loneliness and despair in today's Egypt.

== Awards ==
The film received awards at the following film festivals:

- Doha Tribeca 2010
- Dubai 2010
