= Cinema of Bahrain =

- No. of screens: 44 (2009)
  - Per capita: 4.0 per 100,000 (2009)

Number of admissions (2009)
- Total: 2,184,612

The cinema of Bahrain is small as its lacks support from the government and the private sector. There are many short films produced by individual filmmakers, and about five feature films in Bahrain's history.

There are a number of theaters in Bahrain showing a mix of Indian, American and Arabic movies. Bahrain also has a cinema club established in 1980, and the Bahraini Film Production Company, established in 2006 to support the Bahraini film industry.

== History ==
The first attempt to create a movie theater in Bahrain was in 1922, on the initiative of Bahraini businessman Mahmood Al Saati. He imported a projector and set up a makeshift cinema at a cottage on the north coast of Manama. The first official cinema was established by Abdulla Al Zayed and associates in Manama, in 1937. The cinema had no air-conditioning or heating system so the cinema was moved to an open-roofed building during the winter season with one of the walls being used as a screen. In 1939, the founder of Saudi Arabia, King Abdul Aziz Al Saud, visited the cinema while on a diplomatic visit with the then-Hakim Hamad ibn Isa Al Khalifa.

During the 1930s and 1940s, films were in black and white with the majority of them being predominantly Egyptian as well as some American films. Westerns and the Tarzan films were reported to have been very popular in the country. Initially, the introduction of cinemas drew criticism from elderly citizens who stated that it "would destroy traditional values".

During the pan-Arab era of the 20th century, Egyptian films enjoyed immense popularity in the country.

== Establishment of cinemas ==
In the early 1940s, the Bahrain Petroleum Company opened a cinema in Awali for its staff. The cinema moved to a different building in Awali in 1958, but finally closed in 1991.

In the 1950s and 1960s, eight new cinemas opened in Bahrain, including the Pearl Cinema, Al Hamra Cinema, Al Nasr Cinema and Awal Cinema, all of which were established in Manama. The first cinema to open in Muharraq was Al Jazira Cinema in 1955 and it is still in use today.

The first modern-style cinema to open in Bahrain was the Delmon Cinema at the Gosi Complex in 1996, but it has since closed. The trend for modern-style cinemas was continued by the Bahrain Cinema Company, which opened cinema complexes at Seef Mall in 1998 and in Saar in 2000 respectively. An independent cinema, Dana Cinema, was opened at the Dana Mall in Manama, in 2002. A 20-screen cinema complex was constructed in the Bahrain City Centre, the largest such cineplex in the Middle East. In July 2015, the country's first IMAX theatre was opened in Seef Mall Muharraq under Novo Cinema. Other cinema companies entered the Bahraini market in the 2010s, such as Mexican company Cinepolis in January 2019.

== Films shot in Bahrain ==
- Ajnabee (2001) - an Indian film set in several countries including Bahrain
- Afghan Muscle (2006) - a Danish/Afghan feature-length documentary covering a group of Afghan bodybuilders who travel to the Middle East
- Cinema 500 km (2006) - a Saudi feature-length documentary about a young Saudi film fan who travels to Manama to attend a cinema, there being none in Saudi Arabia
- Nilavu (2010) - a Malayalam Indian film scripted and directed by Ajith Nair has been filmed in the Kingdom of Bahrain as well as in Kerala, India with a cast of newcomers.
- The Sleeping Tree, a drama directed by Mohammed BuAli, released 13 December 2014 (United Arab Emirates)
- Witness Bahrain, a documentary directed by Jen Marlowe, released in 2014

== Bahrain filmmakers ==
- Khalifah Shaheen: considered the first Bahraini filmmaker.
- Bassam Al-Thawadi: Bassam made the 1st Bahraini feature film in 1990, his films include: Al-Hajiz (The Barrier; 1990), Za'er (Visitor; 2004), A Bahraini Tale (2006)
- Mohammed BuAli: one of the new generation of filmmakers, he started making short films in 2006. He is the most active filmmaker in the Bahraini scene now with many accomplishments since he started his filmmaking career: Between Them (2006), From the West (2007), Absence (2008), The Good Omen (2009), Canary (2010)
- Hussain Al-Hulaibi: with theatre background Hussain made 2 feature films: For Girls (2008), Longing (2010)
- Hussain Al-Riffaei: Hussain made three short films two written by Ameen Saleh: Voices (2012), Dinner (2008), The Cage (2009)
- Zeeshan Jawed Shah: Zeeshan made three feature-length films and one under production, Zeeshan is considered as pioneer of Student Film Projects and is famous for his visual effects and special effects in movies: Paranorma (2010), Gilgamesh Pearl (2011), Silveraven (2012), Dead Sands(IMDB link to Dead Sands) (2013) (Pre-Production), "UCB Multimedia Video Showcase 2013" (2013), Bits of What I Have (2015-16)
- Saleh Nass: Award-winning Bahraini filmmaker. His films have featured in over 30 film festivals around the world, currently in development for his debut feature-length film for cinema: The Traveller (2004), Phone Call (2005), The Body (2006), Lu'bba - Game (2012), Souq Al Markazi - Central Market (2014), Beek - Ab - PickUp (2014)

== See also ==
- Arab cinema
- Cinema of the world
- Cinema of West Asia
