= List of cinema industries by location =

== By continent ==
- Cinema of Africa
- Cinema of Asia
  - Cinema of Central Asia
  - Cinema of East Asia
  - Cinema of South Asia
  - Cinema of Southeast Asia
- Cinema of North America
- Cinema of Europe
- Cinema of Oceania

== By country ==
- Cinema of Afghanistan
- Cinema of Albania
- Cinema of Algeria
- Cinema of Argentina
- Cinema of Armenia
- Cinema of Australia
- Cinema of Austria
- Cinema of Azerbaijan
- Cinema of Bahrain
- Cinema of Bangladesh
- Cinema of Belarus
- Cinema of Belgium
- Cinema of Bhutan
- Cinema of Bosnia and Herzegovina
- Cinema of Brazil
- Cinema of Bulgaria
- Cinema of Burkina Faso
- Cinema of Burma
- Cinema of Cambodia
- Cinema of Canada
  - Cinema of Quebec
- Cinema of Chad
- Cinema of Chile
- Cinema of China
- Cinema of Colombia
- Cinema of Croatia
- Cinema of Cuba
- Cinema of Cyprus
- Cinema of the Czech Republic
- Cinema of Denmark
- Cinema of Ecuador
- Cinema of Egypt
- Cinema of Estonia
- Cinema of Eritrea
- Cinema of Ethiopia
- Cinema of the Faroe Islands
- Cinema of Fiji
- Cinema of Finland
- Cinema of France
- Cinema of Georgia
- Cinema of Germany
- Cinema of Greece
- Cinema of Haiti
- Cinema of Hong Kong
  - Hong Kong action cinema
- Cinema of Hungary
- Cinema of Iceland
- Cinema of India
  - Assamese
  - Bengali
  - Bhojpuri
  - Chakma
  - Chhattisgarhi
  - Deccani
  - Dogri
  - Gujarati
  - Haryanvi
  - Hindi
  - Kannada
  - Kashmiri
  - Konkani
  - Malayalam
  - Marathi
  - Meitei
  - Oriya
  - Punjabi
  - Rajasthani
  - Sanskrit
  - Tamil
  - Telugu
  - Tulu
- Cinema of Indonesia
- Cinema of Iran
  - Iranian New Wave
- Cinema of Iraq
- Cinema of Ireland
- Cinema of Israel
- Cinema of Italy
- Cinema of Jamaica
- Cinema of Japan
  - Japanese New Wave
  - Samurai cinema
  - History of anime
- Cinema of Jordan
- Cinema of Kenya
- Cinema of Korea
  - Cinema of North Korea
  - Cinema of South Korea
- Cinema of Kosovo
- Cinema of Kuwait
- Cinema of Latvia
- Cinema of Lebanon
- Cinema of Lithuania
- Cinema of Luxembourg
- Cinema of Malaysia
  - Malaysian Tamil cinema
- Cinema of Mexico
  - Golden Age of Mexican cinema
- Cinema of Madagascar
- Cinema of Moldova
- Cinema of Mongolia
- Cinema of Montenegro
- Cinema of Morocco
- Cinema of Nepal
  - Tharu cinema
- Cinema of the Netherlands
- Cinema of New Zealand
- Cinema of Niger
- Cinema of Nigeria
- Cinema of Norway
- Cinema of North Macedonia
- Cinema of Oceania
- Cinema of Oman
- Cinema of Pakistan
  - Lollywood
  - Pollywood
  - Cinema of Balochistan
  - Cinema of Sindh
- Cinema of Palestine
- Cinema of Paraguay
- Cinema of Peru
- Cinema of the Philippines
- Cinema of Poland
- Cinema of Portugal
- Cinema of Puerto Rico
- Cinema of Romania
  - Romanian New Wave
- Cinema of Russia
  - Cinema of the Russian Empire
  - History of Russian animation
- Cinema of Saudi Arabia
- Cinema of Senegal
- Cinema of Serbia
- Cinema of Singapore
  - Malaysian and Singaporean Tamil cinema
- Cinema of Slovakia
- Cinema of Slovenia
- Cinema of Somalia
- Cinema of South Africa
- Cinema of the Soviet Union
- Cinema of Spain
  - Catalan cinema
  - Cinema of Galicia
- Cinema of Sri Lanka
  - Cinema of Sri Lankan Tamil
- Cinema of Sudan
- Cinema of Sweden
- Cinema of Switzerland
- Cinema of Syria
- Cinema of Taiwan
- Cinema of Tajikistan
- Cinema of Thailand
- Cinema of Tunisia
- Cinema of Turkey
- Cinema of Turkmenistan
- Cinema of Ukraine
- Cinema of the United Arab Emirates
- Cinema of the United Kingdom
  - Cinema of Northern Ireland
  - Cinema of Scotland
  - Cinema of Wales
- Cinema of the United States
  - Cinema of Florida
  - No wave cinema
  - Cinema of Transgression
- Cinema of Uruguay
- Cinema of Uzbekistan
- Cinema of Venezuela
- Cinema of Vietnam
- Cinema of Yemen
- Cinema of Yugoslavia
  - Yugoslav Black Wave

== By region ==
- Cinema of the Caribbean
- Cinema of Latin America
- Cinema of the Middle East

== See also ==
- Film
- History of film
- World cinema
