= Cinema of Yemen =

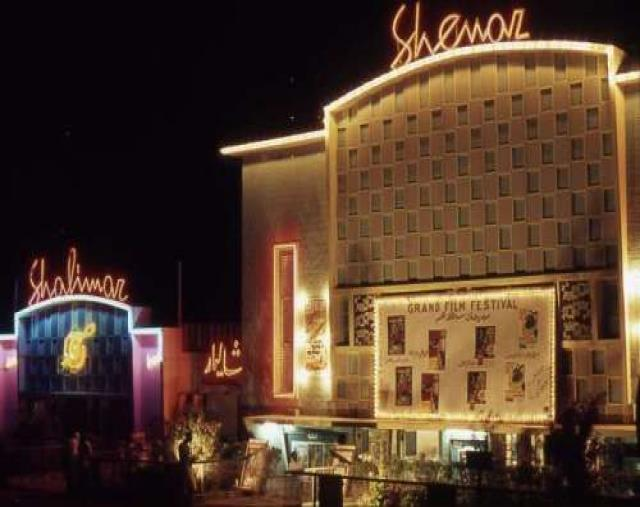
Shahinaz Cinema in Aden (1960)

The cinema of Yemen is relatively obscure, but it has seen glimpses of influence and representation throughout the years. Since the 1920s, when expeditions from Europe arrived in Yemen, the country has been featured in various documentaries and travelogues. These early films introduced audiences to the landscapes, architecture, and culture of Yemen, providing a window into a world they might not have otherwise experienced.

Notable filmmakers like Hans Helfritz, Walter Dostal, Gordian Troeller, Marie-Claude Deffarge, Volker Panzer, and Khadijah al-Salami have contributed to showcasing Yemen's heritage and capturing its essence through their works. Even internationally acclaimed directors like Pier Paolo Pasolini incorporated Yemen's landscapes into their films, adding a touch of exoticism and intrigue to their narratives.

Despite the occasional presence of Yemen in foreign productions, it was not until 2005 that Yemeni cinema gained significant recognition on the global stage. Bader Ben Hirsi, a British filmmaker of Yemeni ancestry, made history with his film "A New Day in Old Sana'a". This romantic drama, seen through the eyes of an Italian photographer, explored love and choices against the backdrop of Sana'a's ancient charm. The film received accolades at the Cairo International Film Festival and was showcased at Cannes, shining a light on Yemeni filmmaking.

The development of Yemeni cinema has been hindered by years of political instability, corruption, and lack of resources. The country's struggles with poverty and limited education opportunities have further restricted the growth of artistic expression, including film production.

In August 2008, Yemen’s Interior Minister Mutaher al-Masri supported the launch of a new feature film to educate the public about the consequences of Islamist extremism. The Losing Bet was produced by Fadl al-Olfi. The plot follows two Yemeni jihadis, who return from years living abroad. They are sent home by an Al Qaeda mastermind to recruit new members and carry out deadly operations in Yemen.

== Films shot in Yemen ==
- The Mulberry House (Yemen/Syria/Egypt/UK/UAE; 2013)
- Karama Has No Walls (Yemen/UAE; 2012)
- The English Sheik and the Yemeni Gentleman (American; 2000)
- Il fiore delle mille e una notte (Italian; 1974)
- Le Mura di Sana (Italian short; 1964)
- Le Schiave Esistono Ancora (Italian; 1964)

== List of Yemeni directors ==
- Bader Ben Hirsi
- Osama Khaled
- Sara Ishaq
- Khadija al-Salami
- Sufian Abulohom
- Yousef Assabahi
- Amr Gamal

== See also ==
- List of Yemeni films of 2023
- Arab cinema
- Cinema of the Middle East
- Cinema of the world
