= Laan (film) =

2011 Djiboutian film

- Directed by: Lula Ali Ismaïl
- Written by: Lula Ali Ismaïl
- Produced by: Lula Ali Ismaïl
- Starring: Lula Ali Ismaïl
- Edited by: Cédric Le Floch, Elisabeth Paquotte
- Music by: Alice Diriney Yabeh, Farah Ahmed Guedi, Guy Bilong
- Release date: 2011
- Running time: 27 min.
- Country: Djibouti
- Languages: French, Somali

Laan (Friends) is a 2011 Djiboutian short film directed by Lula Ali Ismaïl.

== Plot ==
Souad, Oubah and Ayane are three young women in Djibouti who chew on qat and seek love. The three friends met at a young age and have similar experiences. After Souad leaves Djibouti to study abroad, she has trouble finding a lover because she is very demanding and selective when it comes to men. Oubah, meanwhile, is dealing with marital problems that almost leads to a breakdown. Her husband consumes qat frequently and is distancing himself from Oubah. She feels he will leave her, and considers the narcotic leaf worse than a mistress. Ayane is the happiest of the three, as she has a good husband, but also has a deep secret.

== Cast ==
- Fatouma Mohamed Djama
- Lula Ali Ismail
- Fardoussa Moussa Egueh
- Mohamed Ahmed Ismail

== Production ==
Ali Ismaïl had lived in Canada for several years and had roles in some television series, but wanted to make a film. She returned to Djibouti to find inspiration, as she did not have a precise topic, and noticed the prevalence of qat chewing. Ali Ismaïl travelled through Djibouti to seek funds to create the film. She received a positive reaction from many Djiboutians, but was faced with limited resources. She contacted the Ministry of Culture, which replied that it did not have a budget for cinematic productions but was supportive. The working title of the film was Laan iyo qoys ("The leaf (of qat) and the hearth"), emphasizing the role of the plant in the film. In addition to directing, Ali Ismaïl also acted in the film.

== Release and reception ==
The film had its world premiere at the Institut Français Arthur Rimbaud in Djibouti. It was screened at several film festivals in France, Canada, and the United States and was well received. It received an award at the Lausanne Film Festival. Because of the positive response to the film, Ali Ismaïl decided to make a feature film. Her first feature film, Dhalinyaro, was released in 2017.
