= Arab cinema =

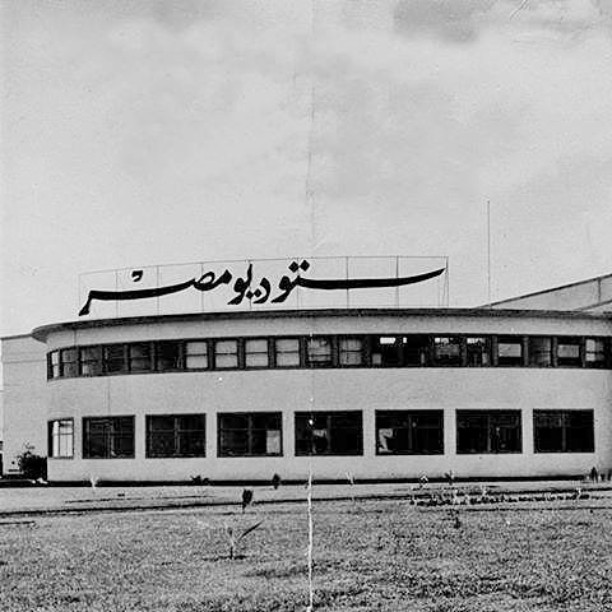
Studio Misr, first national studio of its kind in the Arab world, established in 1935.

Arab cinema or Arabic cinema (Arabic: السينما العربية, romanized: al-sīnemā al-ʿArabīyah) refers to the film industry of the Arab world. Most productions come from Egyptian cinema, and Cairo has been the capital of film industry in the Arab world since the early 20th century to the present day.

The first screening of a motion picture in Egypt occurred in Alexandria in 1896 by the French Lumière Brothers. The Egyptian industry developed from silent movies to talkies, with musicals being the bulk of the productions in the 1930s and 1940s. Of the first Arab-produced films was the 1923 Egyptian film Barsoum Looking for a Job, and Laila, released in Egypt in 1927, while the first Arabic speaking film was Awlad El-Zawat, also released in Egypt in 1932. Studio Misr, founded in 1935, was the first national studio of its kind in the Arab world. The period from the late 1940s to 1960s has been described as "the golden age of Arab cinema", as Arab actors from across the Middle East headed to stardom in Cairo. During this period, notable actors included Hind Rostom, Mahmoud el-Meliguy, Anwar Wagdi, Feyrouz and Soad Hosny. In the 1950s, Egypt's cinema industry was the world's third largest. In 1952, the Egyptian Catholic Center for Cinema Festival was founded to become the first annual film festival in the Arab World. In 1976, the Cairo International Film Festival was established, becoming the first International film festival to be held in the Arab world. Egypt has also contributed to the action genre with actors such as Youssef Mansour who became famous in the 1990s for his martial arts films.

The Egyptian-Jewish Frenkel brothers—Herschel, Shlomo, and David—are regarded as the pioneers of the art of animation in Egypt and the Arab world. Inspired by early American cartoons and silent comedies, they released their first animated film in 1936 titled Mafish Fayda. The first Arabic-language animation series was Mishgias Sawah (1979), released in Egypt, while the first feature-length Arab animated film is The Knight and the Princess, also released in Egypt in 2019. The first television drama in the Arab world, Hareb Min el-Ayyam, was broadcast from Egypt in 1962 during Ramadan. Often called the era of New Arab Cinema, during the mid-1960s to the mid-1970s, the influence of Italian realism and the response to political upheavals combined to create a body of independent Arab films that included traces of Arab melodrama. In 1972, the Kuwaiti drama film Bas ya Bahar became the first narrative feature film in the Gulf, and is considered one of the most important Arabic-language films in Arab filmmaking.

Egypt's domination of Arab cinema has been credited to its development of the dramatic arts, wealth of studios, experienced directors, technicians, film stars, singers and belly dancers. Since the 2010s, a "new wave" of Arab cinema has included films that explore links with genre cinema – including fantasy, sci-fi and horror. Since the Arab Spring, Arab films have also become more political. In what has been described as a "vibrant new era" of Arab cinema, the 2020s has seen a growth in the Saudi film industry, with some stability in Egypt, Tunisia and Morocco. In 2023, the Egyptian 3D horror film Day 13, became the first Arabic 3D film. In the same year, the Saudi horror film, The Cello, became the first Arabic international horror film. Also that year, Sukkar, backed by the Saudi-owned production house MBC Group, was touted as the Arab world's first musical movie in the Western canon. Currently, the Middle East's largest cinema chain is Vox, owned by UAE-based Majid Al Futtaim Cinemas.

== Overview ==
Arab cinema includes films from various countries and cultures of the Arab world and therefore does not have one form, structure, or style. Arab cinema mostly includes films made in Egypt, Lebanon, Syria, Iraq, Kuwait, Algeria, Morocco, and Tunisia; however, by definition, it also includes Bahrain, Djibouti, Jordan, Libya, Oman, Palestine, Qatar, Saudi Arabia, Somalia, Sudan, United Arab Emirates, and Yemen. In its inception, Arab cinema was mostly an imitation of Western cinema. However, it has and continues to constantly change and evolve, as each country in the region has its own unique characteristics and identifiable brand of cinema.

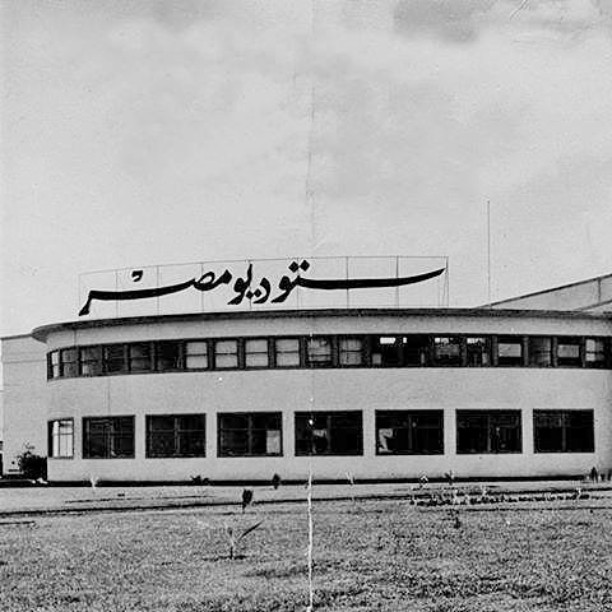
Studio Misr, first major studio production in the Arab World, established in 1935.

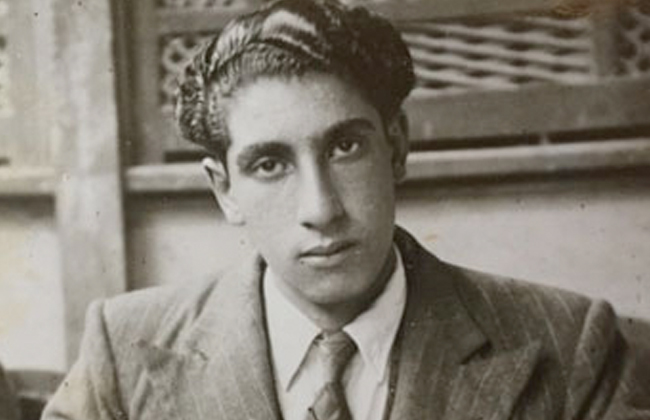
Youssef Wahbi, one of Egypt's pioneers in film industry. Among the most famous Egyptian and Arabic actors and filmmakers.

Egypt, in particular, is a pioneer among Arab countries in the field of cinema. A sustained film industry was able to emerge in Egypt when other parts of the Arab world had only been able to sporadically produce feature-length films due to limited financing. As such, Arabic cinema is dominated by films from Egypt, where three quarters of all Arab movies are produced. According to film critic and historian Roy Armes, Lebanese cinema is the only other cinema in the Arabic-speaking region that could amount to a national cinema.

While Egyptian and Lebanese films have a long history of production, most other Arab countries did not witness film production until after independence. Even at the end of the 20th century, most film productions in countries like Bahrain, Libya, Saudi Arabia, Sudan, and the United Arab Emirates are limited to television or short films.

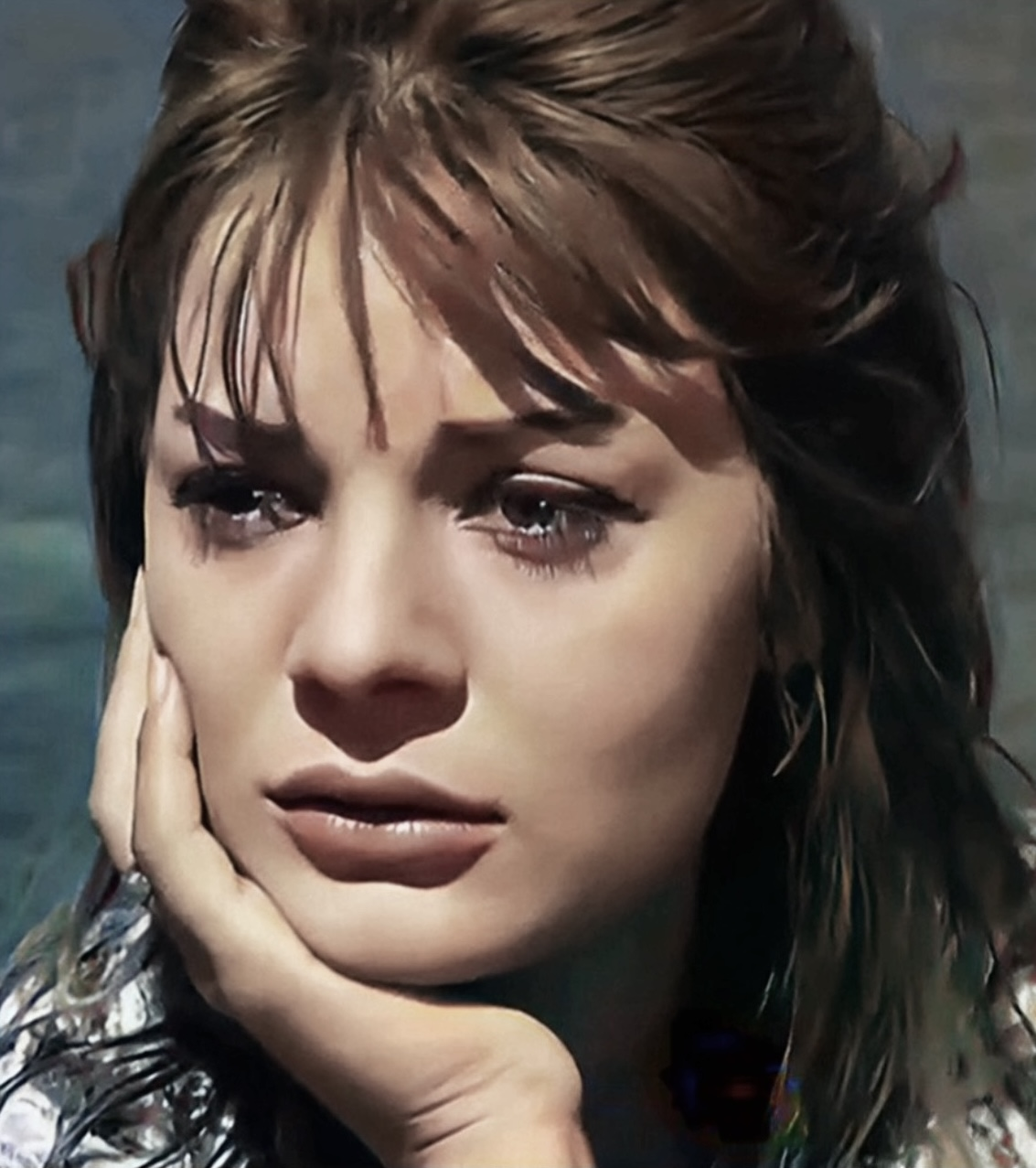
Nadia Lutfi (1937–2020), Egyptian film star

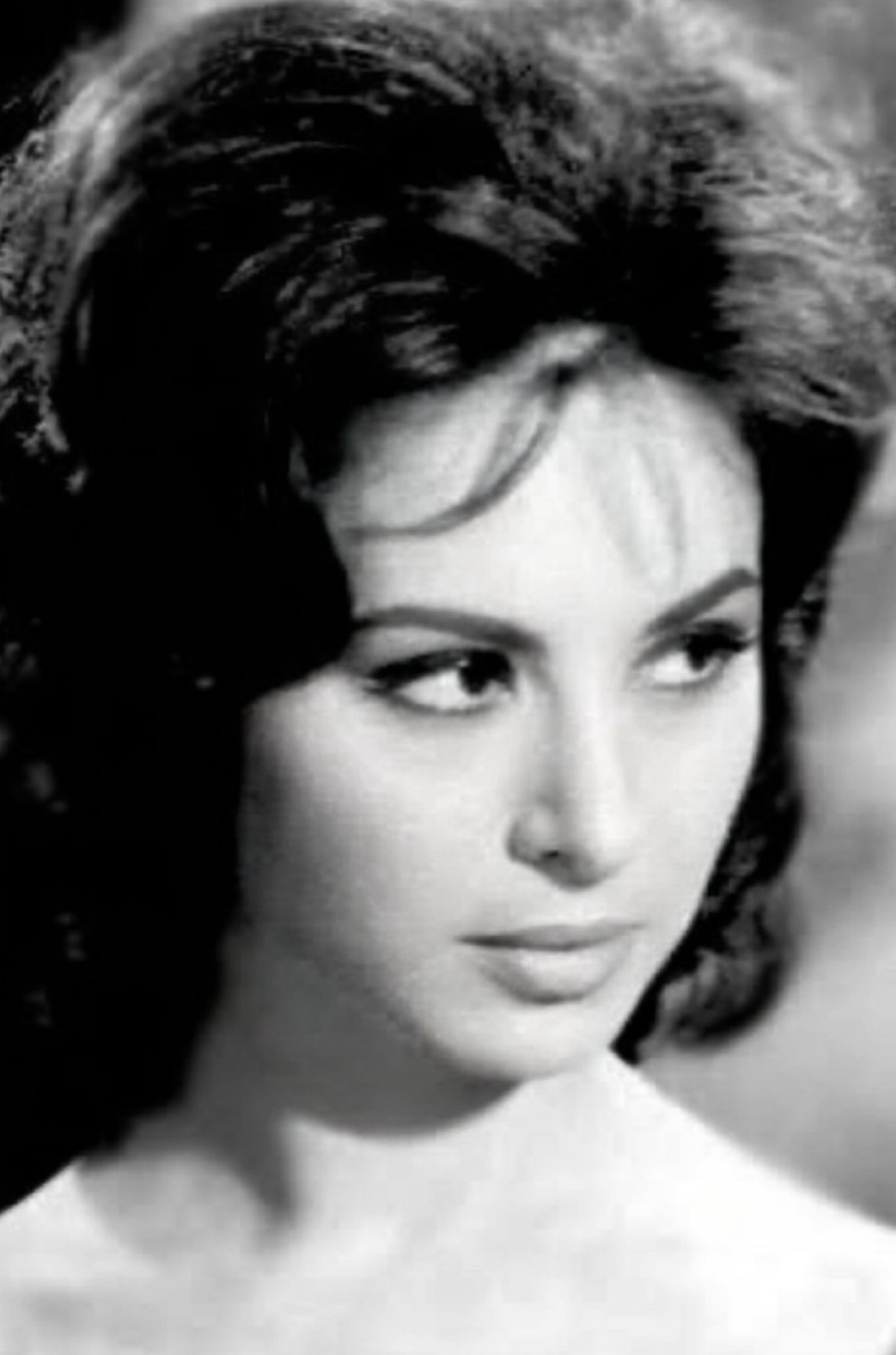
Faten Hamama (1931–2015), Egyptian film star

Elsewhere in North Africa and the Middle East, film production was scarce until the late 1960s and early 1970s, when some filmmakers began to receive funding and financial assistance from state organizations. It was during the post-independence era, when Arab cinema in most countries started. Most films produced at that time were funded by the state and contained a nationalistic dimension. These films helped to advance certain social causes such as independence and other social, economic and political agendas.

There is increased interest in films originating in the Arab world. For example, films from Lebanon, Algeria, Morocco, Palestine, Syria, and Tunisia have been shown more often in local film festivals and repertoire theaters than during the late 1900s.

Arab cinema has explored many topics from politics, colonialism, tradition, modernity and social taboos. It has also attempted to escape from its earlier tendency to mimic and rely on Western film styles. In fact, colonization did not only influence Arab films, but it also had an impact on Arab movie theaters. Also, the portrayal of women became an important aspect. Arab woman shaped a great portion of the film industry in the Arab world by employing their cinematic talents in improving the popularity of Arab films.

However, the production of Arab cinema has also experienced decline, and filmmakers in the Middle East have been trying to "face up to their reality".

== Origins and history ==
Full-length feature films began to be produced locally in the Arab world after the 1920s. For instance, the Egyptian film Laila in 1927. At that time, the process of inserting sound into movies used to be done in Paris, and Egypt was only able to produce two sound films, one titled Awlad Al-Thawat (Sons of Aristocrats) and the other Unshudat Al-Fu’ad (The Song of the Heart). In addition to the Syrian film Al-Muttaham Albari' (The Innocent Accused), presented in 1928, Mughamarat Ilyas Mabruk (The Adventures of Ilyas Mabruk) in Lebanon in 1929. Although these films were produced in the Arab world, they mostly were directed, produced, or showed artistic influence from foreigners or immigrants.

=== Film production in Arab cinema ===
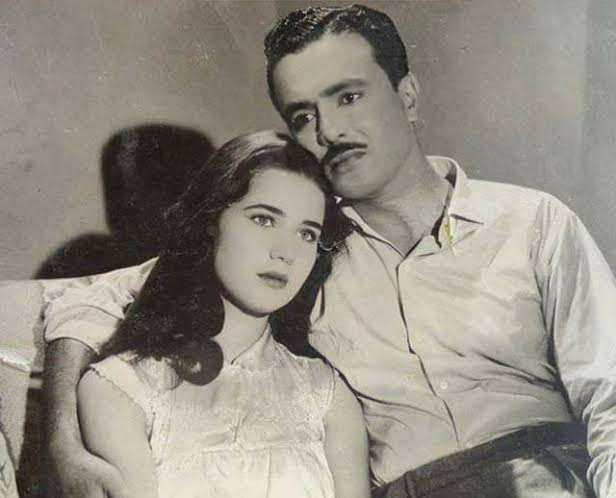
Salah Zulfikar and Zubaida Tharwat in Inni Attahim, 1960.

Arab cinema did not flourish before the national independence of each of them, and even after, the films production of Arab cinema was restricted to short-length films. However, there were exceptions for some of them. For example, Egypt scored the highest number in producing films and produced more than 2,500 feature films. During the 1950s and 1960s Lebanon produced 180 feature films. Two full-length Kuwaiti films were produced at the end of 1970s, and a full-length Bahraini film was produced in 1989. Syria produced around 150 films, Tunisia approximately 130, 100 films were produced each in Algeria and Iraq, almost 70 in Morocco and the films made in Jordan were less than 12.

=== Movie theaters in the Arab world ===
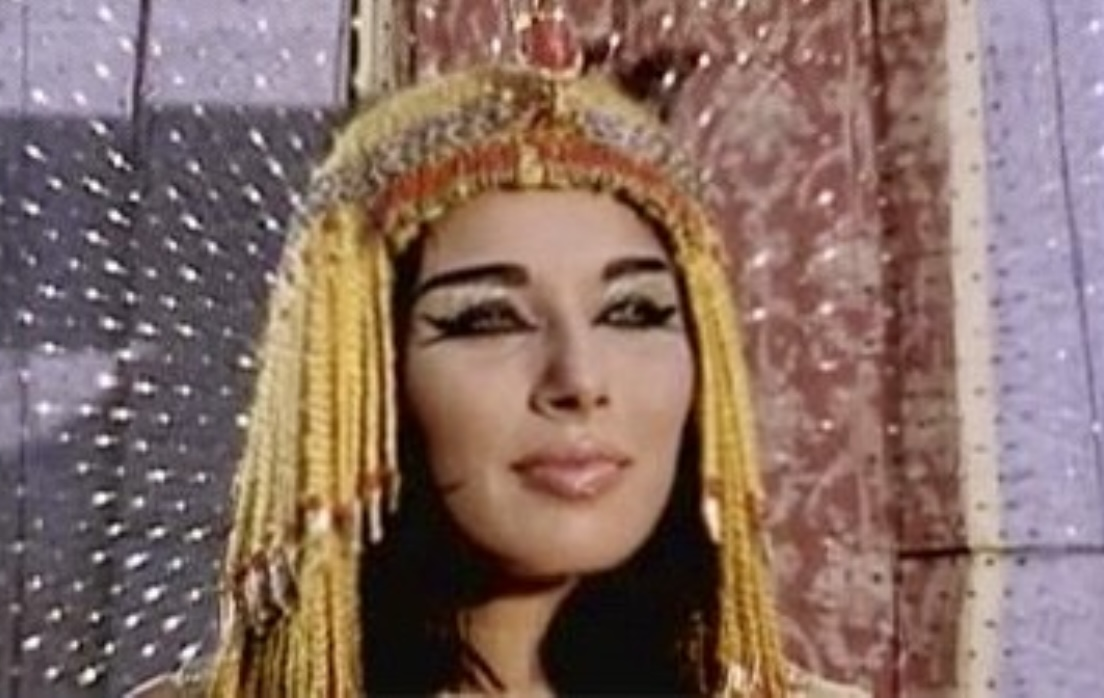
Lobna Abdel Aziz in Bride of the Nile, 1963.

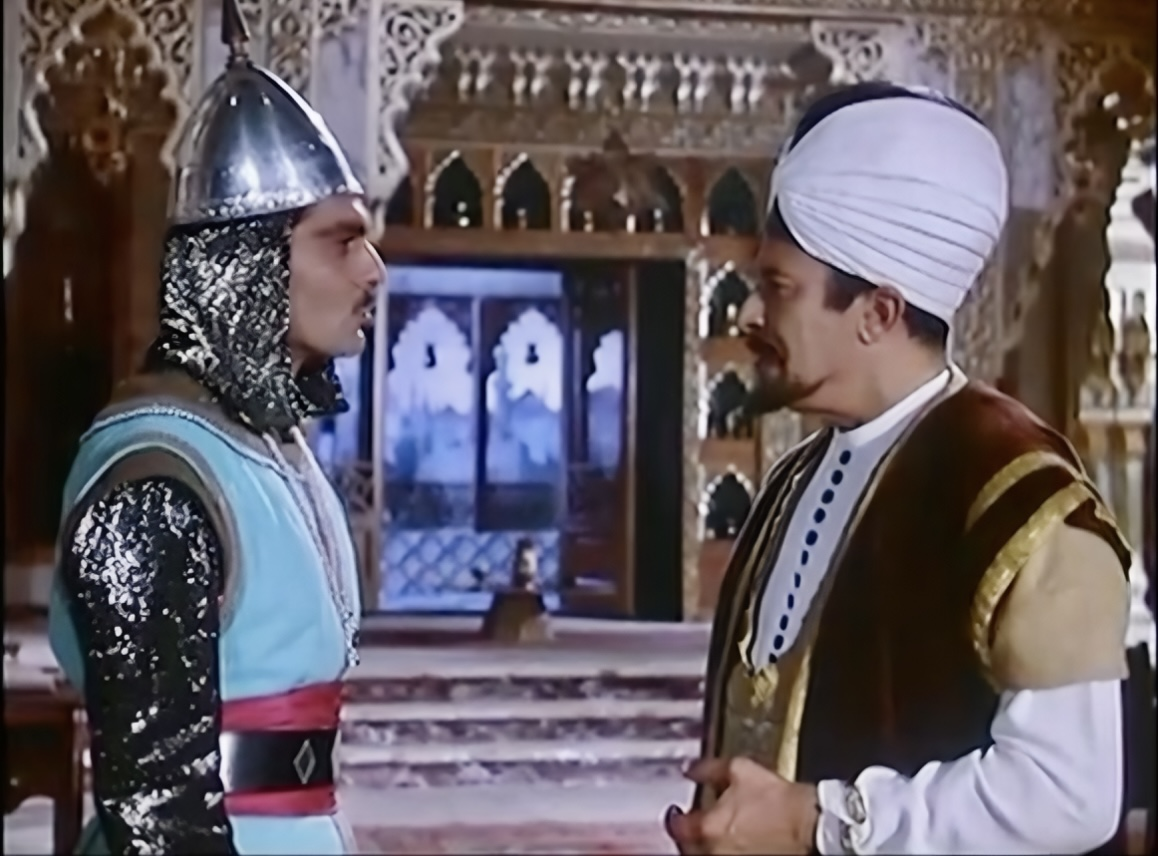
Omar Sharif and Emad Hamdy in The Mamelukes, 1965.

The influence of films and cinemas on Arabs was due to the effect of the West on the Arab world; therefore, natives were not the owners for the movie theaters that are located in their own lands.

The first cinema in Egypt was built by the French company Pathé in 1906 in Cairo, aside from the cinématographe that was owned by the Lumière Brothers in Alexandria and Cairo. In Tunisia, they had the Omnia Pathé, which did not launch before 1907.

In 1908, a cinema called "Oracle" was opened in Jerusalem by Egyptian Jews. Also in 1908, in some of Algerian cities, cinemas were built in places depending on the population of Europeans who lived there, such as in Oran. Less than 20 years later, most of the Arab countries had more than a theatre for films screening. In Saudi Arabia and North Yemen, cinemas were not accepted or were prohibited because of religious objections.

Between the 1960s and 1970s, however, this issue was, in general, solved and accepted by King Faisal of Saudi Arabia. In alliance with the Crown Prince of Saudi Arabia Mohammed bin Salman's vision of 2030, which calls to expand the artistic, cultural, and entertaining fields in the country, there opened the first cinema in Jeddah on 18 April 2018.

=== Impact of conflict on Egyptian and Palestinian cinema ===
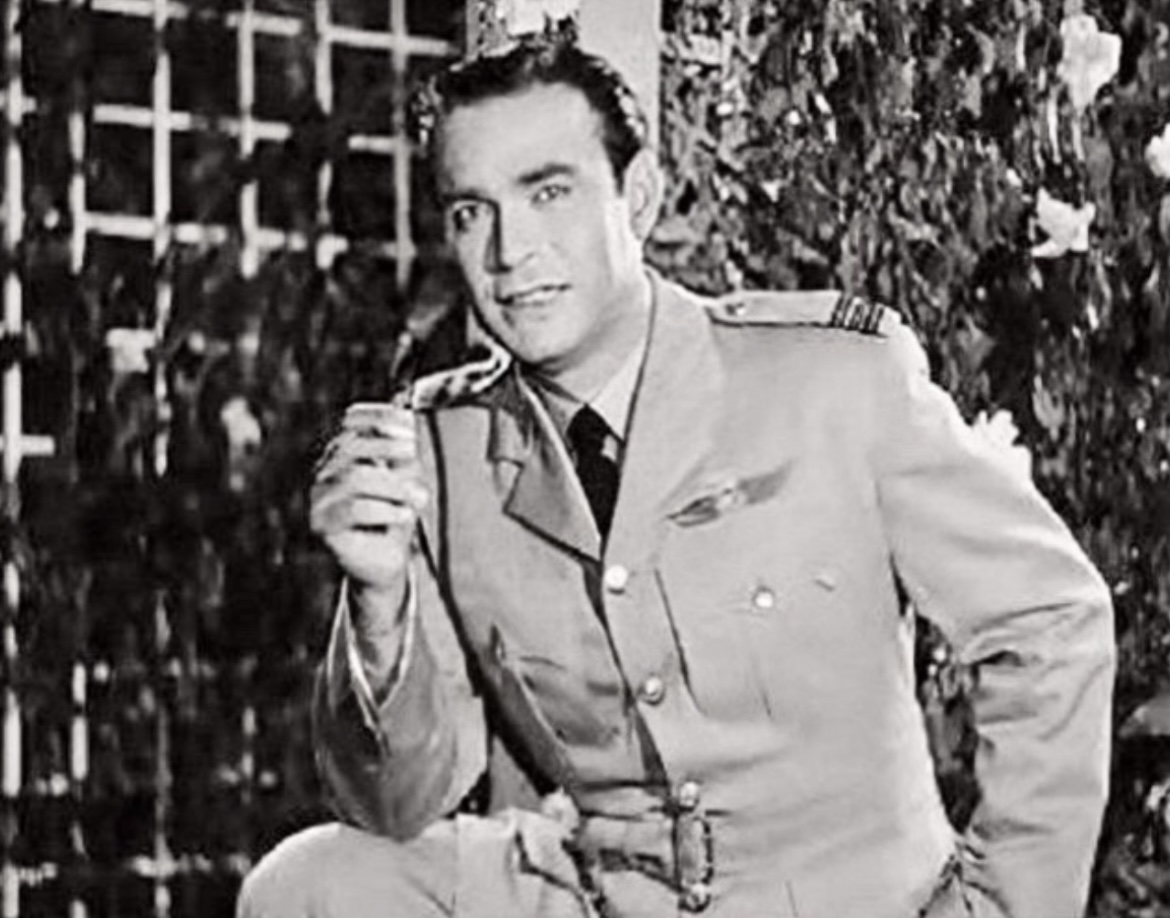
Mahmoud Zulfikar in A Girl from Palestine, 1948.

The history of the Arab cinema was impacted by political challenges such as the Egyptian revolution of 1952, defeat by Israel in 1967, and the Palestinian resistance.

During the 1952 Egyptian revolution, the feudalist system was substituted with a nationalist ideology led by the Rais. This new government had impacted the film industry, in which many of the films produced were 'social realist' works depicting the real life of Egypt. Many of the films produced by Salah Abou Seif in 1952 were neorealism such as Master Hassan, which portrayed the difficulties of the different classes in Cairo. This system is said to be derived from the Italian neorealism, though it was not very successful as only a few films were produced.

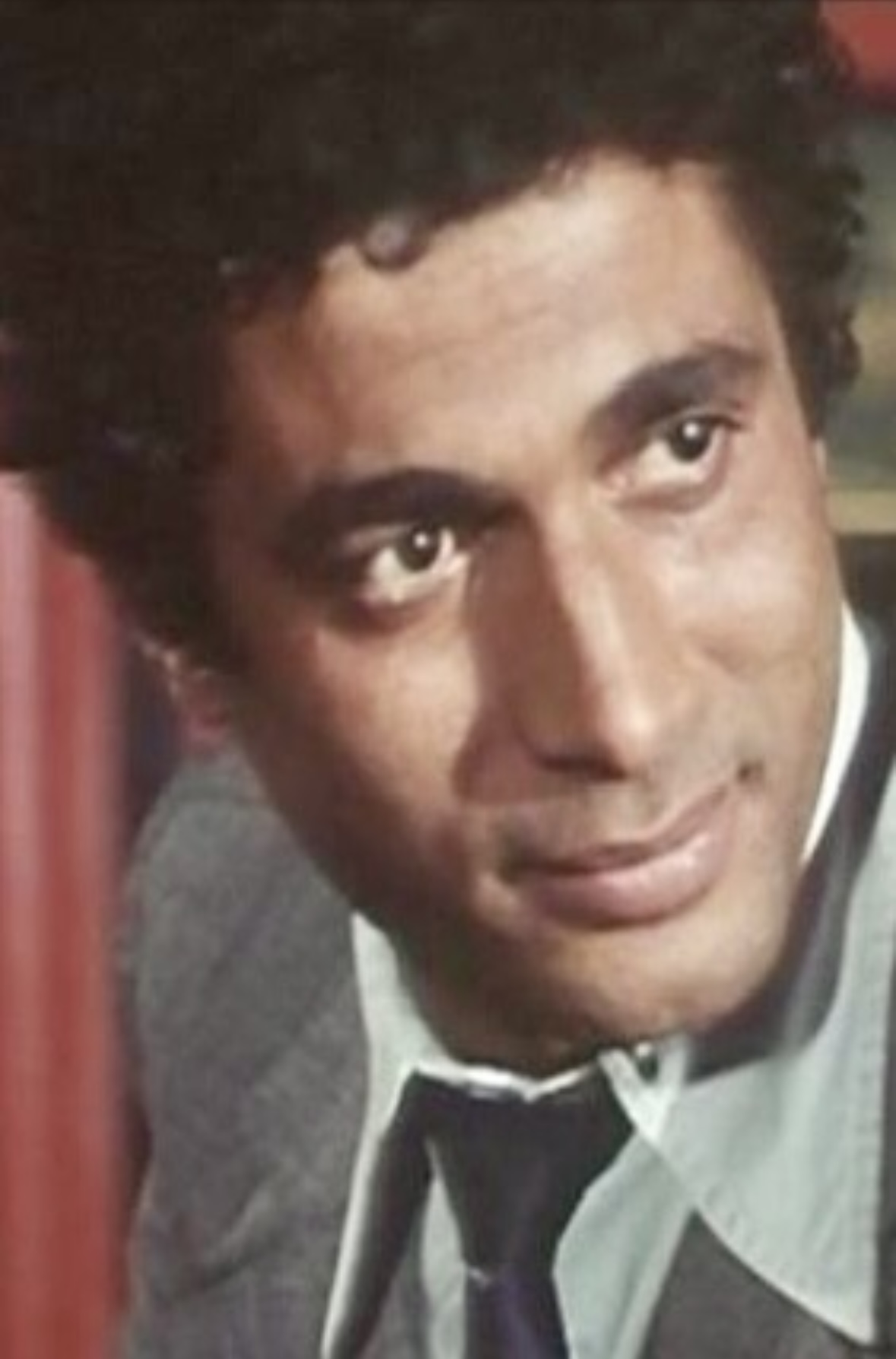
Ahmed Zaki in Alexandria... Why? (1979)

After the Arab nation was defeated by Israel in 1967, an Association of New Cinema was introduced, the representatives of which wrote a manifesto in 1968 calling for "the emergence of a new cinema with deep roots in contemporary Egypt," wherein "It is necessary to establish a real dialogue within the Egyptian culture to create new forms." However, the Palestinian resistance has inspired many of the Arab filmmakers since 1948 to produce films about their struggle. In fact, in 1972, an Association of Palestinians was developed to bring all the Arab filmmakers together whose work was about the Palestinian resistance.

== Role of women in Arab cinema ==
Samia Gamal is regarded as one of the most prominent Egyptian belly dancers in the golden era of Egyptian cinema. Her influence extended beyond the realms of Arabic cinema. She is credited with bringing belly dancing from Egypt to Hollywood and from there to the schools of Europe.

Women succeeded in representing 6% of the total number of feature filmmakers in the Maghreb during the 1990s, and less in percentages in the Middle East. The first 35mm feature film to be directed by an Algerian woman was Rachida (2002), by director Yamina Bachir-Chouikh.

In the 2000s, the number of women in the film medium increased and was likeable in Lebanon, Morocco, and Tunisia. Arab women directors were more considerable to women's lives in the Arab world. Arab women also pioneered in screenwriting, where such people as Algerian novelists and prize-winning Assia Djebar and Hafsa Zinaï-Koudil made their own feature films, released in 1978 and 1993 respectively.

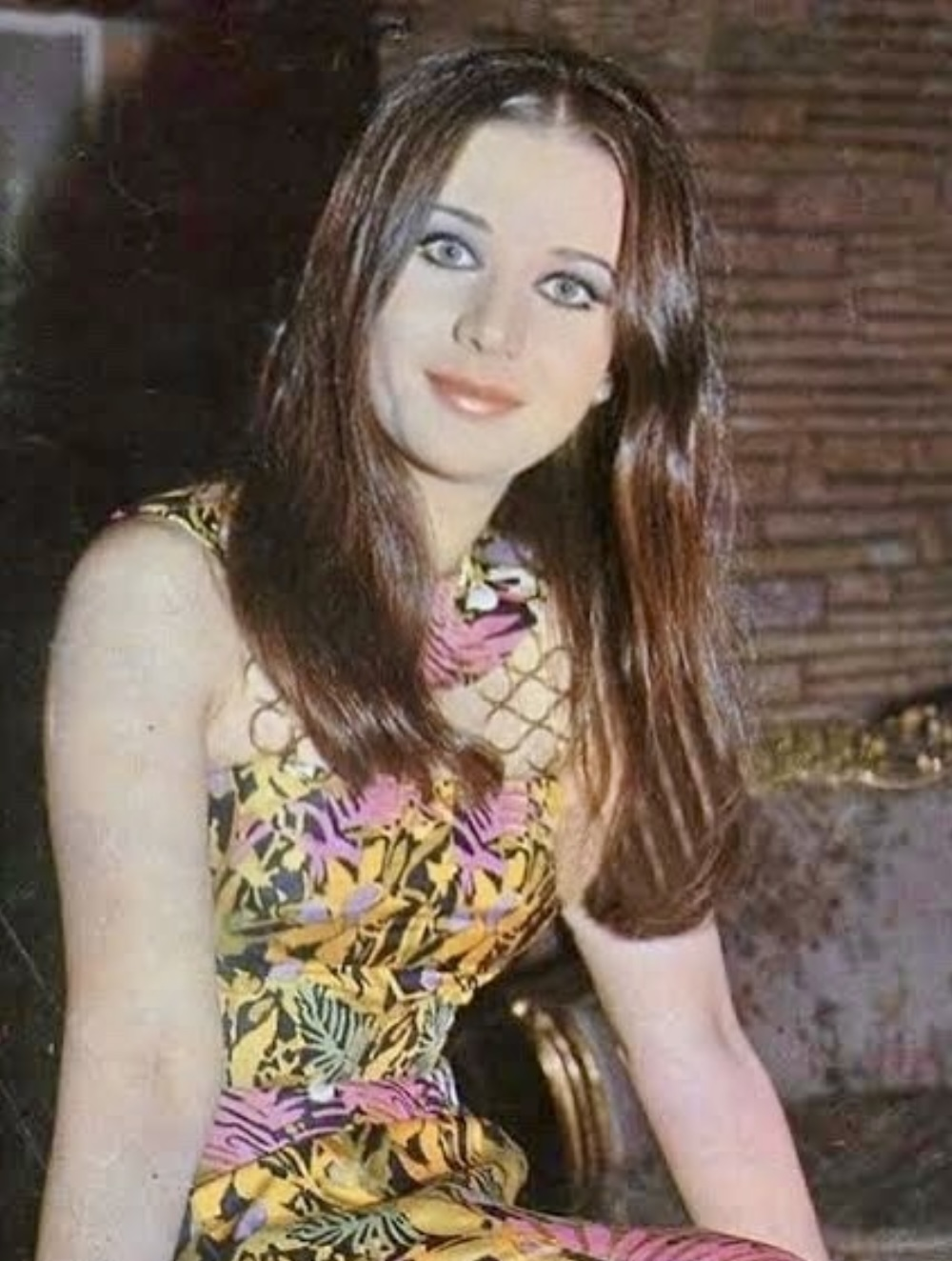
Zubaida Tharwat, (1940–2016), Egyptian film star

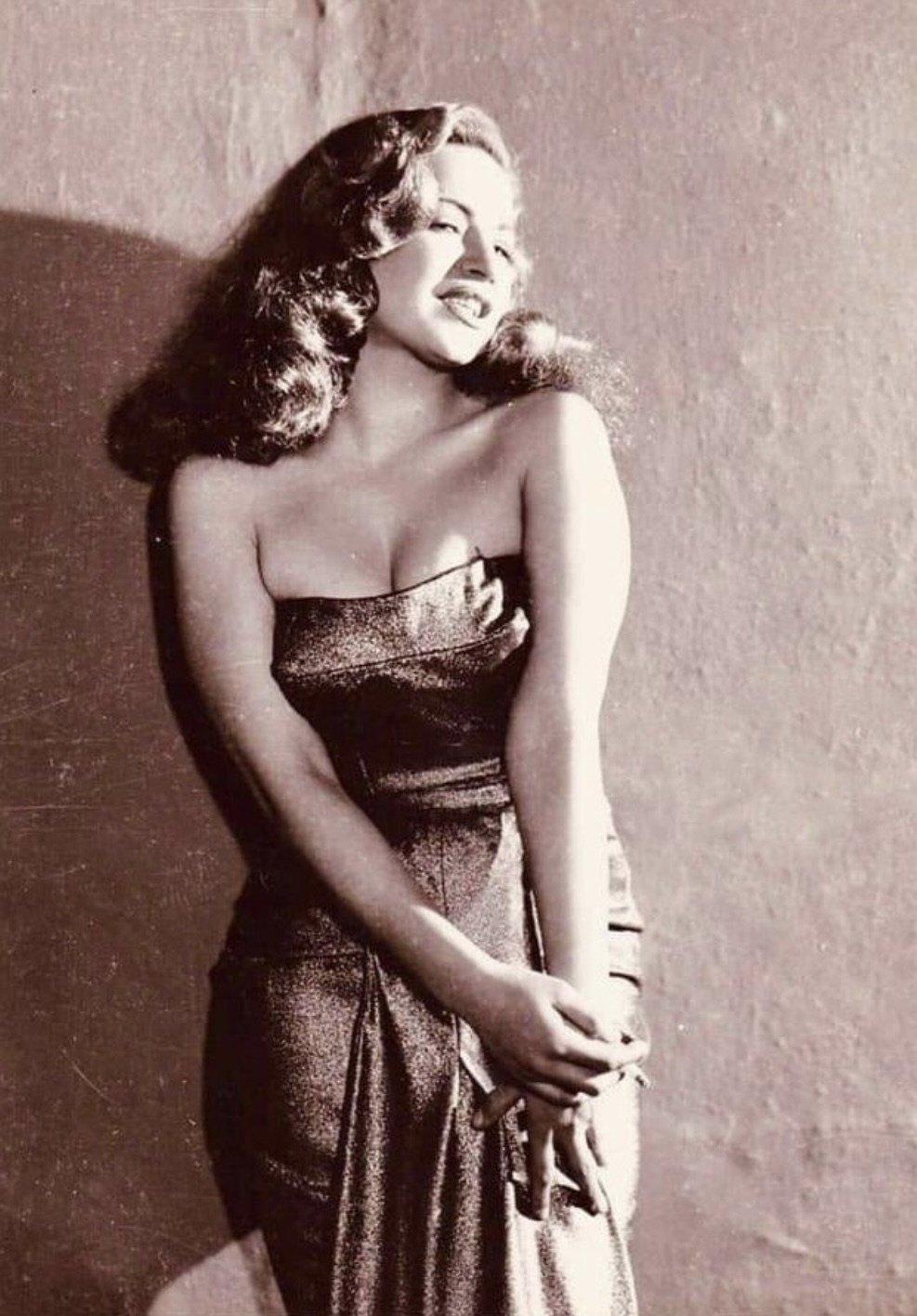
Hind Rostom in the early 1950s. Rostom was considered a sex symbol from a golden era of Egyptian cinema.

Women from the Middle East who were interested in filmmaking were cared of since they, who were born during the 1960s and 1970s, were sent to study about this medium in the United States, such as Najwa Najjar from Palestine and Dahna Abourahme from Lebanon, and others who studied Paris, Canada, and New York. Therefore, the European style in their feature films is noticeable, apart from the effect of colonization. Arab women filmmakers also had an important role in providing sense of civil war traumas that happened during the war, as well as touching on social issues that were specifically related to women, such as sexual abuse.

Pursuing a film career was risky in the 1930s, especially for women, due to their traditional domestic roles at the time. Nonetheless, one of the female pioneers in Egyptian cinema, Bahiga Hafez, assumed a leading role in shaping the emerging film industry as a producer, director, and composer. Hafez's debut film, Al-Dahaia (The Victims, Egypt, 1932), is a highly regarded film within Arab cinema.

== Arab filmmakers born in the 1960s ==
The new generation of filmmakers born in the 1960s had used cinema as a way of expressing their national identity and the political history of their countries, since the Middle East experienced many political upheavals, including wars and invasions. Although these independent filmmakers had their own cinematic approaches, they were heavily influenced by the West, especially by France through European film training and other programs that were offered.

These Arab filmmakers produced films concerning issues related to the freedom of expression and the role of women in society. In fact, filmmakers such as Nadia El Fani and Laïla Marrakchi made films that were sexually explicit and unlikely to be depicted in public Arabic cinemas. These female filmmakers and many others, especially from Lebanon, Tunisia and Morocco focused on shedding light on women's issues on the Arabic screen. However, Armes believes that "the views of the 2000s generation [of filmmakers] are defined by the pressures and possibilities of globalization." Many of the Arab independent filmmakers have hybrid identities and the different personal and global references are reflected in their films, which Rizi describes as "transnationality".

For example, the producer of the Last Friday is Palestinian-Jordanian who was raised in Saudi Arabia and worked in the city of Amman. These cosmopolitan identities of independent Arab filmmakers have given them access to major funding institutions. Furthermore, the rise of new digital technology in the Middle East has aided in the production of documentary films by young filmmakers through the availability of equipment. Thus, the film 5 Broken Cameras by a Palestinian director speaks of the influence of these technologies in the region. Apart from documentaries, feature films covered issues of national identity, life in the diaspora and nostalgia, as they were aiming to connect outsiders with the Arab society. For example, the Algerian feature film Bled Number is about an Algerian who left France and returned to Algeria, where his family greeted him with love and support. These Arab filmmakers have reflected the national, political and historical context of their countries in their films and also discussed issues related to criticism, freedom of expression and women's social roles.

== Festivals ==
There are numerous film festivals that have historically been and are held in various parts of the Arab world to both honor and showcase films from the Arab regions, as well as international standouts.

=== Existing festivals ===
Festival	Location	Description
Aswan International Women's Film Festival	Aswan, Egypt	The Aswan Women's Film Festival was founded in 2016.
Beirut Cinema Platform	Beirut, Lebanon	The Beirut Cinema Platform is held every year in the spring.
Cairo International Film Festival	Cairo, Egypt	This festival has been held annually in Cairo since 1976, and has been accredited by the International Federation of Film Producers Associations. There is also another festival held in Alexandria. Of the more than 4,000 short- and feature-length films made in Arabic-speaking countries since 1908, more than three-quarters were Egyptian.
Carthage Film Festival	Tunis, Tunisia	Created in 1966, this festival takes place in Tunis rather than Carthage, despite its name.
El Gouna Film Festival	El Gouna, Egypt	This annual film festival was established in 2017, and is held in the Red Sea resort town of El Gouna.
Luxor African Film Festival	Luxor, Egypt	Established in 2012, it is an annual film festival for African cinema. In October 2019 the Malmö Arab Film Festival recognized LAFF for having "made great strides and [become] one of the most important festivals specialized in African cinema". The festival is run by the Independent Shabab Foundation (ISF).
Marrakech International Film Festival (FIFM)	Marrakesh, Morocco	FIFM is an annual international film festival that has, since its inaugural year in 2000, been one of the biggest events devoted to Moroccan cinema. It is also the site of the principal photography of many international productions. The festival's jury gathers international writers, actors and personalities, and endeavors to reward the best Moroccan and foreign feature and short films. The FIFM is chaired by Prince Moulay Rachid of Morocco.
Red Sea International Film Festival	Jeddah, Saudi Arabia	Established in 2018 by the Kingdom's first Minister of Culture, Badr bin Abdullah Al Saud, the team includes Saudi and international programmers, curators, and directors – all dedicated to connecting the world through film. The RSIFF brings the best in Arab and world cinema to Jeddah. The Festival showcases new films on the Saudi big screen, alongside retrospective programs celebrating the masters of cinema, the latest Saudi films, and feature and short film competitions. There are also industry events and workshops nurturing the next generation of talent. A comprehensive industry program running alongside the public festival, the Red Sea Souk, is the opportunity to connect with the Arab film scene. In collaboration with the TorinoFilmLab, the Lodge hand-picked twelve emerging filmmakers, pairing each with a mentor to support and enhance their work throughout the creative process. The Red Sea Fund, a $10–million fund aimed at supporting projects with directors from the Arab world and Africa, is set to back more than 100 feature projects in its first year, as well as episodic content, and will also be open to short films from Saudi nationals.
Mogadishu Pan-African and Arab Film Symposium (Mogpaafis)	Mogadishu, Somalia	The inaugural Mogpaafis was held in 1987, bringing together an array of prominent filmmakers and movie experts from across the globe, including other parts of Northeast Africa and the Arab world, as well as Asia and Europe. Held annually in the Somalian capital of Mogadishu, the film was organized by the Somali Film Agency, the nation's film regulatory body.
Tripoli Film Festival	Tripoli, Lebanon	Elias Khallat founded and continues to curate the annual Tripoli Film Festival, held every year in the spring in the city of Tripoli.
Ajyal Film Festival	Doha, Qatar	The Qatari Film Festival Ajyal Film Festival was launched in November 2013, with the aim to foster the film industry within the region and showcasing worldwide representation.

=== Defunct or cancelled festivals ===
==== Dubai International Film Festival ====
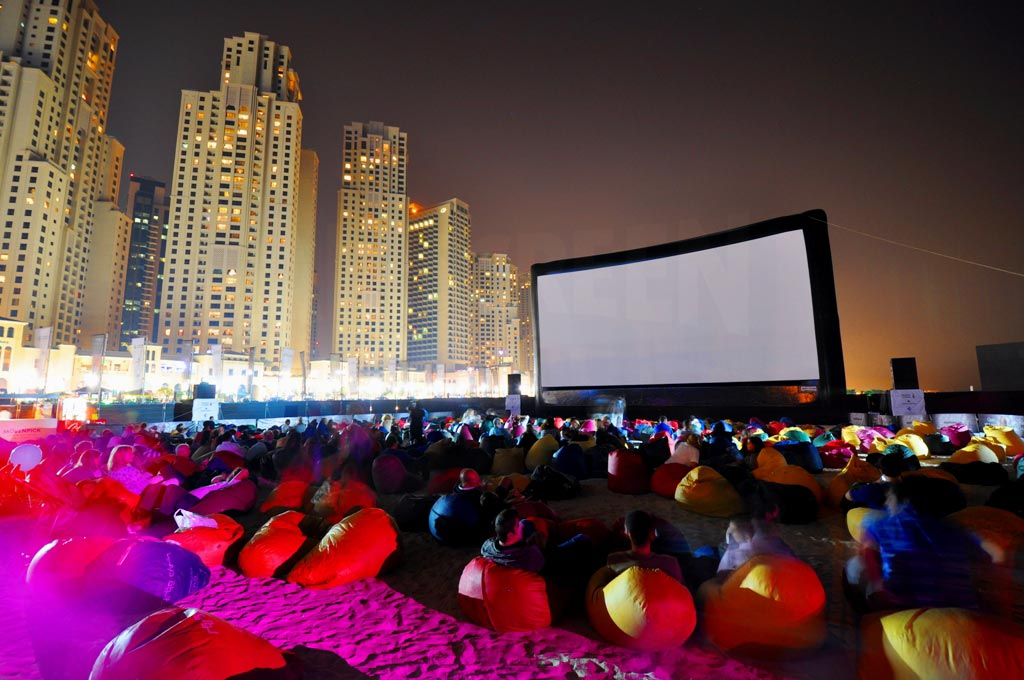
20m wide inflatable projection screen at the 2010 Dubai International Film Festival.

The Dubai International Film Festival (DIFF) was an international film festival based in Dubai, United Arab Emirates. Launched in 2004, it aimed to foster the growth of filmmaking in the Arab world. The DIFF is held under the honorary Chairmanship of Ahmed bin Saeed Al Maktoum. It was a not-for-profit cultural event, presented and organized by the Dubai Technology, Electronic Commerce and Media Free Zone Authority.

DIFF presented cinematic excellence from around the world and offers a high-profile platform for aspiring home-grown talent. The Muhr Award for Excellence in Arab Cinema was launched in 2006, with the aim of recognizing Arab filmmakers both regionally and internationally. In 2008, the Muhr Awards for Excellence were expanded to include two separate competitions, the Muhr Arab Awards, and the Muhr Asia Africa Awards. It also introduced a new program segment dedicated exclusively to Animation.

==== Abu Dhabi Film Festival ====
The Abu Dhabi Film Festival (ADFF) was another key international film festival in the larger Arab region. Created in 2007, the ceremony was held annually in October in Abu Dhabi, UAE by the Abu Dhabi Authority for Culture and Heritage (ADACH), under the patronage of Sheikh Sultan Bin Tahnoon Al Nahyan, Chairman of the ADACH. The ADFF aimed to encourage and foster the growth of filmmaking in the Arab world by showcasing movies from the region alongside standout productions from prominent international filmmakers. The first festival debuted with 152 movies and 186 screenings shown in five Abu Dhabi venues. A total of 76 feature films and 34 short films from over 35 countries competed for the Black Pearl Awards.

==== Doha Tribeca Film Festival ====
The Doha Tribeca Film Festival (DTFF) was an annual five-day film festival founded in 2009 to promote Arab and international film, and to develop a sustainable film industry in Qatar. The Festival was one of Qatar's largest entertainment events attracting over 50,000 guests in 2010.

DTFF was the annual film festival of the Doha Film Institute, an organisation founded by H.E. Sheikha Al Mayassa bint Hamad bin Khalifa Al-Thani which implements, consolidates and oversees film initiatives in Qatar.

The 3rd annual DTFF was scheduled to take place from 25 to 29 October 2011 at Katara Cultural Village, Doha. Approximately 40 films were to be screened at the festival, within various themed sections, showcasing World and Middle Eastern Cinema.

== Support initiatives ==
In conjunction with the European Audiovisual Entrepreneurs (EAVE) professional training, networking and project development organization, the Dubai International Film Festival in 2010 also began offering to filmmakers the Interchange group of development and co-production workshops earmarked for directors, screenwriters and producers from the larger Arab region.

In 2011, the Abu Dhabi Film Festival launched the SANAD development and post-production fund for cineastes from the Arab world. With the goal of encouraging independent and auteur-based cinema, eligible filmmakers now have access to financial grants, screenwriting and pitch workshops, and personal meetings with industry mentors and experts.

The Arab Cinema Center was established by Alaa Karkouti and Maher Diab of MAD Solutions in 2015, with the aim of promoting Arab filmmakers and films. It has a presence at major film festivals, conducting various panels and sessions. It has an annual awards event at the Cannes Film Festival, at which the Critics Awards for Arab Films are presented.

== Censorship and transnational influence on Arab cinema ==
Arab cinema has been shaped by both state censorship and the influence of transnational actors, including external production companies, distribution companies, and public film funds as well as state actors such as occupying powers. Films produced in the Arab world have been often subjected to state censorship on the grounds of political content, violence, torture, nudity, blasphemy and sexual content, though the extent and enforcement of censorship vary across countries. In order to receive financial funding, which is often not available in the MENA region, and to enter the film festival circuit, several Arab film makers have resorted to cooperations with Western production companies and sought financial support from European and American public film funds. This has led to Western involvement in these films, often influencing both their technical direction and content. Some Arab directors have criticized Western production companies and film funds for selecting narratives that affirm their stereotypes of the Arab world. Palestinian film director Suha Arraf described her experience with Western film funds in an interview as follows:

"Europeans want us to focus on their common stereotypes about Palestinian women...They expect us to deal with the relationship between Arabs and Jews, or deal with the separation wall, the conflict between Fatah and Hamas, or draw attention to the backwardness and folklore in our own society. One of the examples is women being killed for what is called 'family honor." Within the Arab film industry, there are voices that call for the end of "total control by large international production and distribution companies".

Egyptian cinema

As Egyptian cinema was the forerunner of Arab cinema, censorship of Arab cinema started simultaneously with its birth. In 1911, Egyptian police chiefs were assigned the task of monitoring cinema movies shown in Egyptian theaters, based on a law on press regulations that had been in force since 1904. Years later, in 1921, official censorship was consolidated which stated that all films that came outside of Egypt had to be approved by the General Security Department of the Ministry of the Interior. Although only imported movies had to pass the General Security Department of the Ministry of the Interior – they constituted the majority of films screened in Egyptian theaters – domestically produced films were also censored by interference of the Al-Azhar al-Sharif Institute. In 1949, the Faruq code, a censorship law, was issued by the Ministry of Social Affairs in order to ban realist films that were described by the Ministry as leftist. During the Nasser era, as, according to Gamal Abdel Nasser, cinema served as a tool for disseminating and achieving revolutionary goals, his regime started exercising censorship over Egyptian film production. The production of historical and political films was allowed on the condition that the films did not criticize the regime From 1971 to 1973, during Anwar Sadat's presidency, Law 35/1978 was issued, which required film producers and performers to be a member of the Federation of Artistic Unions. To become a member, Egyptian film makers and performers had to graduate from a recognized educational institution and be admitted by committees based on criteria such as 'being of sound reputation.' This law therefore prevented independent and amateur productions. Following the rise of Hosni Mubarak, in the 1980s, external non-state actors from the Gulf states began to exert increasing influence on Egyptian cinema, as distribution companies from the Arab states of the Persian Gulf, such as the MBC Group and Rotana Cinema, mostly from Saudi Arabia, owned a substantial amount of archived Egyptian films, which allowed them to gain control over Egyptian cinema production; this resulted into more prudishness in Egyptian films, visible in the sharp decrease of kisses in Egyptian films. After the 2011 revolution, Egypt's state censorship policies did not change significantly, and films and series depicting policemen and members of the army negatively were frequently banned by censorship employees. Since 2017, the Abdel Fattah el-Sisi administration has been more involved in the entertainment sector through the creation of a new regulatory agency and a new firm by the name of United Group for Media Services. This firm owns production companies and Egyptian cinemas, censors content, and decides which productions are allowed to air. Prominent Egyptian film directors such as Khaled Youssef have criticized the increased state control over Egyptian cinema.

Palestinian cinema

Before the foundation of Israel, there were several instances of Palestinian film-making. The first Palestinian film production studio, Studio Palestine, was established in 1945. However, the development of Palestinian cinema was delayed by Nakba, which shattered the Palestinian community. In the 1960s, the first Palestinian films after the Nakba were produced in refugee camps by Palestinian resistance organizations to strengthen and disseminate Palestinian identity and contest Zionist narratives. It was difficult for Palestinian movie makers to reach Palestinians audiences in the West Bank and Gaza, as Israel shut down cinema theaters. In Arab countries, Palestinian film was only screened for a limited public, as Arab institutions disapproved of what they viewed as inciting and nationalist content. Between 1969 and 1974, there was a short period of Palestinian cinema within the Syrian public sector cinema. The production and distribution of these Palestinian films was often obstructed by the Syrian Ministry of Culture and the Syrian military intelligence for their critique of Arab society and Arab leaders. After 1987, Palestinian film making started taking shape in Gaza, the West Bank and inside Israel although often in collaboration with Western television channels and institutions. Arab citizens of Israel, who are Palestinian, face discrimination and struggle to receive funding for their films from the Israeli Ministry of Culture or Israeli foundations. Most of the funding goes to Jewish filmmakers while Arab productions are often rejected on grounds that they are "radically politicized" or "critical of the state of Israel."

Lebanese cinema

While Lebanese cinema suffers relatively less censorship compared to other Arab film industries, there are several instances of state censorship. Lebanon's censorship body is the General Security, which belongs to the Ministry of Interior and is of military nature. Lebanese censorship laws date back to the 1920s and aim to restrict content violating public decency, causing division between Lebanon and friendly countries or igniting sectarian divisions. Lebanon's application of its censorship laws is often inconsistent and at times, influenced by Lebanon's religious authorities. An example of this is Randa Shahal's film Civilized, which the General Security Committee required to obtain approval by both Muslim and Christian clerics.

21st century

In the 21st century, many Arab filmmakers and cultural commentators are concerned about the current state and production of the Arab cinema. In November 2000, Arab filmmakers from eleven countries across the Middle East held a meeting to further address this issue and discuss the future of the Arab cinema, as they are of the opinion that Arab cinema has been declining in popularity and quality. In fact, during the meeting, many of the directors, including the Omani, Kuwaiti, Emirati and Saudi participants believed there wasn't any film industry in their country to talk about. According to the Iraqi director, the film industry in his country has been suffering since the 1990s. The Palestinian filmmaker, Elia Suleiman, said that there are no interesting Arab films to watch any more.

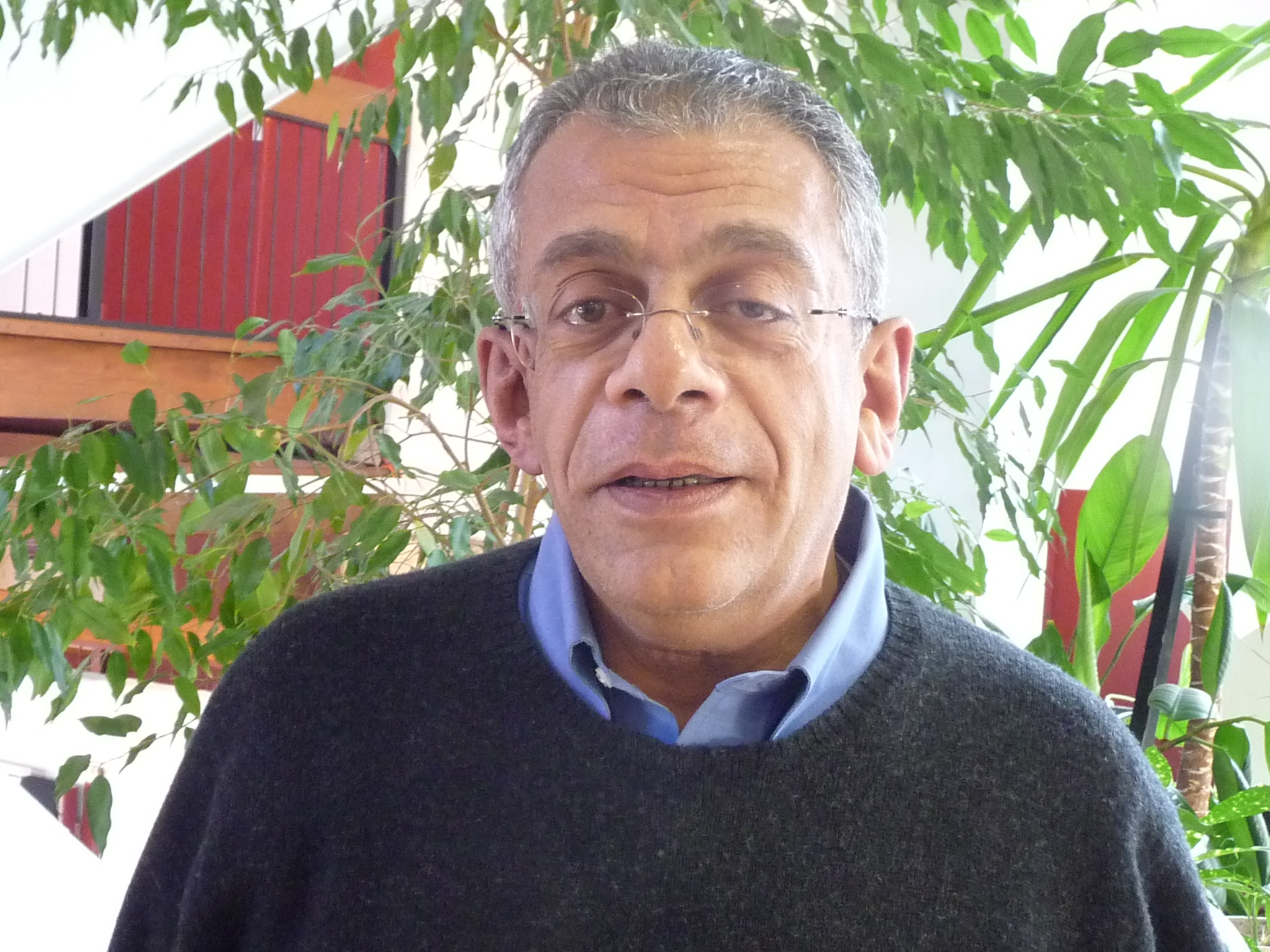
Yousry Nasrallah, Egyptian film director

Moreover, even Egypt, 'the Hollywood of the Arab world' is declining and is unable to compete with Hollywood cinema and the American imported films. As, "the number of domestic productions has dramatically shriveled – from over sixty films a year in the 1960s to a little over a dozen a year today – and even those are being pushed out of theaters by the American imports". One of the solutions, which the Egyptian filmmaker and director of El Medina, Yousry Nasrallah, came up with, is to establish a cinema for screening only Arab films, and he also ensures that there are people who are willing to invest in his project. One of the potential reasons for the decline in the production of the Arab cinema is due to the political conflicts. For example, the Palestinian cinema was introduced in 1976 and has always dealt with politics. Many of the films produced were documentaries about wars and refugee camps. Moreover, filmmakers across the Middle East such as Rashid Masharawi, Ali Nassar and many others began to also develop films on the Palestinian and Israeli conflict.

According to Nana Asfour, the decline of the Arab cinema in the 2000s was partially due to the great restrictions and censorship the Arabs put on directors who produce challenging films such as Ziad Doueiri and Randa Chahal Sabbag and who travel to the West to screen their films. She concludes by saying that "If enough Arab filmmakers follow their [directors'] lead and if enough Arabs learn to appreciate and nurture their domestic talent, Arab cinema could very well find itself a worthy companion to the acclaimed film industry of neighboring Iran."

At the same time, a new generation of Arab filmmakers began to reach international audiences through documentary and hybrid cinema. Syrian filmmaker Feras Fayyad emerged as one of the most prominent figures of this shift, becoming the first Syrian director to receive an Academy Award nomination and the only Syrian filmmaker to be nominated twice, for Last Men in Aleppo (2017) and The Cave (2019). His work, focused on war, survival, and civilian life in Syria, brought contemporary Arab experiences into major global film institutions.

The Saudi horror movie The Cello (2023), which was written by Turki Al-Sheikh, directed by Darren Bousman, and stars Jeremy Irons and Tobin Bell, as well as Elham Ali and Samer Ismail, is regarded as the first Arabic international horror film.

== See also ==
- Cinema of Egypt
- Cinema of Lebanon
- Cinema of Syria
- Cinema of Jordan
- Cinema of Libya
- Cinema of Iraq
- Cinema of Morocco
- Cinema of Algeria
- Cinema of Tunisia
- Cinema of Saudi Arabia
- Cinema of United Arab Emirates
- Cinema of Qatar
- Cinema of Eritrea
- Cinema of Djibouti
- Cinema of Somalia
- Cinema of Kuwait
- Cinema of Bahrain
- Cinema of Oman
- Cinema of Palestine
- Cinema of Yemen
- Cinema of Sudan
- Cinema of South Sudan
- Cinematography studios of the Middle East
