= List of Omani films of 2014 =

The Omani film industry produced two feature films in 2014. This article fully lists all non-pornographic films, including short films, that had a release date in that year and which were at least partly made by Oman. It does not include films first released in previous years that had release dates in 2014.
Also included is an overview of the major events in Omani film, including film festivals and awards ceremonies, as well as lists of those films that have been particularly well received, both critically and financially.

== Minor releases ==
| Title | Director | Release date | Genre | Citation |
|---|---|---|---|---|
| A serious comedy | Lander Camarero | September 2014 (Spain) | Documentary | |
| Operation Oman | Tristan Ofield | | Documentary | |

== See also ==
- 2014 in film
- Cinema of Oman
