= Sempre Xonxa =

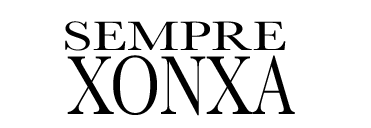
- Directed by: Chano Piñeiro
- Written by: Chano Piñeiro
- Produced by: Manuel Martínez Mallo
- Starring: Uxía Blanco; Miguel Ínsua; Xavier R. Lourido; Roberto Casteleiro; Roberto Vidal Bolaño
- Cinematography: Miguel Ángel Trujillo
- Edited by: Cristina Otero
- Music by: Pablo Barreiro; Carlos Ferrant; Marcial Prado
- Production companies: Baños Films; Biblos Clube de Lectores; Ignacio Benedeti Cinema S.L.; La Voz de Galicia
- Release date: 25 November 1989
- Running time: 114 minutes
- Country: Spain
- Language: Galician
- Box office: €138,638.32

Sempre Xonxa (Galician for Always Xonxa) is a Galician-language film from Galicia, Spain directed and written by Chano Piñeiro and released in 1989. It was the first Galician feature film shot in 35 mm, along with Urxa, by Carlos Piñeiro and Alfredo García Pinal, and Continental by Xavier Villaverde, making it one of the first fiction films in the Galician language. The film is about the emotional consequences of emigration and is set in rural Galicia.

Sempre Xonxa was, during 20 years, the biggest theatrical success for a film in Galician, until 2019 when Fire Will Come eventually attracted more spectators.

== Plot ==
Two boys, Pancho and Birutas, live in the same village and are platonically in love with the local girl Xonxa. But one of the boys, Birutas, has to emigrate with his family, leaving Xonxa and Pancho in the village. When Birutas returns from the United States many years later, having become a rich man, Xonxa is already married to Pancho.

== Cast ==
- Uxía Blanco as Xonxa
- Miguel Ínsua as Birutas
- Xavier R. Lourido as Pancho
- Roberto Casteleiro as Caladiño
- Roberto Vidal Bolaño as D. Xosé Luís
- Rodrigo Roel as Don Camillo, the priest
- Rosa Álvarez as Rosa, Pancho's mother
- Loles León as Minga
- Aurora Redondo as Mamarosa
- Luchi Ramírez as the daughter of Xonxa as a child
- Xaime Nogueira as the son of Xonxa as a child
- María Viñas as Xonxa (adolescent)
- Roberto Fernández as Pancho (adolescent)
- Manuel Alonso as Birutas (adolescent)
- Noela A. Mosquera as Xonxa (baby)
- Giselle Romero as Xonxa (child)
- Xavier Rocha as Pancho (child)
- Miguel A. Gómez Sanz as Birutas (child)
- María Pujalte
- Xosé Manuel Olveira "Pico"
- Manuel Ferrol as Himself

== Production ==
The screenplay for Semper Xonxa met its first draft at the end of 1985, even before Esperanza was shot. Chano Piñeiro found inspiration in the stories of emigration he had heard told in his native Forcarei, and in the villages of Rubillón and Baíste in the municipality of Avión, where he filmed Mamasunción. The film had up to nine versions before the final script in 1988. Between version by version, Chano Piñeiro started looking for places to shoot the film, and found Santa Olaia de Valdeorras, whose village would be the village of Trasdomonte in fiction.

== See also ==
- Cinema of Galicia
