= ElCinema.com =

Egyptian database for movies and actors

elCinema.com
- Website type: Online database of movies, TV series, and celebrities
- Available in: Arabic, English
- Owner: Damlag SAE
- Creator: Damlag SAE
- Website: elcinema.com
- Commercial: Yes
- Registration: Optional
- Users: Over 5 million users per month
- Launched: 2008; 18 years ago
- Current status: Active
- Content license: Proprietary

elCinema.com is the largest Arabic-language online database for film, theater, and television, providing information on Arab and international works since the birth of cinema in the early 20th century. Launched in 2008 by Damlag SAE, an Egyptian telecommunications company, the website offers detailed information about movies, TV series, and stage productions from the Middle East and North Africa region, as well as international works. elCinema.com features biographies, news, reviews, and multimedia content related to Arab cinema, television, and theater. The website is available in both Arabic and English languages and aims to create a rich online community for users of all ages.

== Overview ==
elCinema.com offers a comprehensive database of movies, TV series, and stage productions from the Arab world and beyond, with content spanning from the early days of cinema to contemporary works. Users can browse or search for information on films, TV shows, actors, directors, and other industry professionals. The website also includes movie and TV show reviews, news, and multimedia content such as trailers, photos, and interviews.

In addition to its extensive database, elCinema.com offers a range of services, including an exclusive online ticket booking service in Egypt since 2012, cinema schedules for ten Arab countries, user ratings and discussion forums, a platform for users to post reviews and opinions, a comprehensive guide of all movies currently playing in Egyptian and Arab cinemas, a TV guide for satellite network channels in the pan-Arab region, video browsing, a large collection of rare photos and film posters, a guide to seasonal works, and featured lists of works with various

filters.

== Features ==
=== Database ===
The elCinema.com database contains detailed information on Arab and international films, TV series, and stage productions, including plot summaries, production details, cast and crew lists, and filmography. Users can search the database using various filters, such as country, genre, and production year.

=== Ticket booking ===
elCinema.com offers an exclusive online ticket booking service for cinemas in Egypt, allowing users to reserve seats without waiting in long box office queues. The website also provides cinema schedules for ten Arab countries, including the UAE, Kuwait, Lebanon, Bahrain, Qatar, Saudi Arabia, Oman, Jordan, Iraq, and Syria.

=== Reviews and user-generated content ===
elCinema.com features movie, TV show, and stage production reviews from both critics and users. Registered users can rate and review works on a scale of 1 to 10. The website also offers a platform for users to post their reviews and opinions, fostering a space for constructive dialogue regarding all aspects of the arts.

=== News ===
The website provides the latest news and updates on Arab cinema, television, and theater, including film announcements, industry events, and celebrity news.

=== Multimedia ===
elCinema.com hosts a variety of multimedia content related to Arab cinema, television, and theater, such as movie trailers, behind-the-scenes footage, interviews, and photo galleries. The website also offers a large collection of rare photos, Arab and international film posters, promotional photos, cast and crew photos, and behind-the-scenes photos.

== History ==
Elcinema.com was founded in 2008 by Khaled Bassyouny, an Egyptian passionate about Arabic movies, soap operas, and drama series. Bassyouny established a company called Damlag to manage the website and was listed on a government-run technology incubator program. The company closed successful deals with both local and foreign businesses, including a mobile phone services company that was granted a two-year license to use elCinema.com's electronic content while retaining the intellectual property rights.

In its early days, elCinema.com attracted around 700,000 unique visitors per month, quickly becoming a rising star in the Arabic online movie industry. Bassyouny envisioned elCinema.com as the Middle East's largest Arabic movie database, with plans to build a video platform that would target independent movie making without distribution.

Although the initial user interface was exclusively in Arabic, elCinema.com expanded to include English interfaces in February 2010. The company aimed to become the number one content repository for everything related to the Arabic movie industry, regardless of the language. A revamped version of the website, including social networking functionality, was launched in January 2011, allowing users to invite friends to the movies, like movies, and access a mobile interface.

Elcinema.com's primary sources of revenue have been advertising and content syndication. The website has collaborated with movie distributors to promote new releases and has sold content to other portals, such as du telecoms-owned anayou.com, with whom they signed a two-year syndication agreement.

Over the years, elCinema.com has faced competition from other Arabic online video streaming portals, such as MBC-owned Shahid.net and Forga.com, backed by major shareholders in The Arab Company for Arts & Publishing (FUNUN). Despite the competition, elCinema.com has leveraged its position in the market as the Middle East's largest Arabic movie database, continuing to grow and attract millions of users.

In addition to expanding its language offerings and user interface, elCinema.com has continued to focus on providing an extensive and up-to-date database of Arabic and international works, as well as artist biographies and other related content. As the website has grown, so too has its influence on the Arab entertainment industry, solidifying its position as a key player and essential resource for film, television, and theater information in the region.
