= Cinema of Libya =

The cinema of Libya has had an uneven history. Though there was little local film production in Italian Libya and the Kingdom of Libya, cinema-going became a popular entertainment activity. From 1973 until 2011, Muammar Gaddafi exercised control over the country's cinema mainly through the production of propaganda and government controlled and sanctioned entertainment. Though he encouraged some local filmmaking, his obstruction of foreign film consumption resulted in the closing of most cinemas throughout the country.

Following Gaddafi's ouster in the 2011 civil war, in the post-2011 instability in Libya, hopes for a resurgence of Libyan cinema combine with a lack of infrastructure.

== Pre-1967 cinema ==
The earliest recorded film to be made in Libya was a 1910 French-made documentary, Les habitants du desert de Lybie. Italy, as a colonial power, made some short documentaries about Libya. Libyan battles during World War II were covered in British, German and Italian newsreels. After the war, oil companies and international agencies made occasional documentaries. After independence in 1951, the Kingdom of Libya made some short films about Leptis Magna to encourage tourism. Yet Libya was poor and there was relatively little filmmaking in the country. In 1959 the Ministry of News and Guildance established a cinema division, touring the country with 16mm documentaries and newsreels, and the Ministry of Education and Learning produced some educational films.

Despite the relative lack of cinematic production, film consumption was extremely popular as entertainment. The country's first cinema had been established as early as 1908, though it was reportedly demolished after the Italian invasion of Libya in 1911. The Italians established cinemas, mostly but not exclusively for Italian audiences, in Libya's major cities. From the 1940s until the mid-1960s, Libya boasted a large number of cinemas: around 14 or 20 in Tripoli, and around 10 in Benghazi. Cinemas in Tripoli included the outdoor Arena Giardino and the opulent Royal Cinema, which Gaddafi would rename Al-Shaab (The People).

== Cinema under Gaddafi ==
Gaddafi came to power in the 1969 coup. He regarded foreign films with suspicion, regarding them as American cultural imperialism. Previously the only feature films shot in Libya had been by foreign filmmakers – films like Albert Herman's 1942 A Yank in Libya or Guy Green's 1958 Sea of Sand. The first Libyan feature film, Abdella Zarok's black-and-white When Fate Hardens / Destiny is Hard appeared in 1972. In 1973 the General Council for Cinema was founded, to take control of filmmaking and cinema building in Libya. Foreign films were dubbed into Arabic, and needed to comply with the government's cultural policy, a mix of religious law and nationalism. Most home-made films were documentaries, and social realism was promoted as an ideal for fiction films. The General Council for Cinema continued to operate until 2010. It made documentaries, around 20-25 short films, and helped support the few feature films that were made in the 1970s and 1980s.

Gaddafi exercised direct personal control over film production. For example, he censored the release of a film by Kasem Hwel, Searching for Layla al-‘Amiriya. Gaddafi established a production company to make Egyptian films. In the mid-1970s the government took increasingly direct control of all cinemas, blocking the importation of films, and cinemas began to close.

Alongside Kuwait and Morocco, Gaddafi's government-sponsored Mustafa Akkad's controversial 1976 filmic account of the birth of Islam, The Message. However, many Arab countries would not screen the film, and it triggered a Nation of Islam siege of three office buildings in Washington, D.C. Akkad's Lion of the Desert (1981), funded by Gaddafi's government, was a historical action movie portraying the Bedouin leader Omar Mukhtar resistance against the Italian colonization of Libya. The film was censored in Italy until 2009.

In 2009 it was announced that Gaddafi's son al-Saadi Gaddafi was financing private-equity production company involved in financing Hollywood films like The Experiment (2010) and Isolation (2011). In 2009–2010 foreign companies agreed to refurbish and re-open Libyan cinemas and theatres. However, the 2011 revolution resulted in this work coming to a halt, and much of the equipment was stolen.

== Cinema since 2011 ==
After the fall of Gaddafi, there was widespread desire for Libyan film to re-assert itself. However, cinema's resurgence has been obstructed by fighting and Islamist objections. Young Libyan filmmakers started to make short films, with support from the British Council and the Scottish Documentary Institute. Film festivals in Tripoli and Benghazi were popular but targeted by Islamist militants. The International Mediterranean Film Festival for Documentary and Short Films was established in 2012. In 2013 a cinema club was discreetly established in the basement of a Tripoli art gallery. By 2015 only a single movie house remained in Tripoli, a men-only venue serving action movies to the militias controlling the city.

In December 2017 Erato Festival, a film festival for human rights films was launched in Tripoli. It opened with Almohannad Kalthoum's docudrama Jasmine.

The documentary feature film My Father and Qaddafi, the first feature-length documentary by Libyan filmmaker Jihan K, made its world premiere out of competition at the 82nd Venice International Film Festival, from August 27 to September 6, 2025. The film made history as the first Libyan title to be presented at the Venice International Film Festival.

== See also ==
- Arab cinema
- Cinema of Africa
