= Alexandra Ramniceanu =

French film producer and screenwriter

- Born: Alexandra Ramniceanu; 1976 (age 49–50); Paris, France
- Education: New York University
- Occupations: Screenwriter, producer
- Years active: 2002–present

Alexandra Ramniceanu (born 1976), is a French film producer and screenwriter. She is best known for co-producing the Djiboutian first feature film Dhalinyaro.

== Personal life ==
Ramniceanu was born in 1976 in Paris, France. She was trained at New York University about filmmaking and producing. She also studied finance and business management.

== Career ==
In 2002, she worked as a reader for distributors. She then joined as a production assistant with the independent film producer Steve Suissa at Films de l'Espoir to produce two feature films: Comme Si De Rien n'Était and Le Grand Rôle. Then, the duo produced the short film Meprise which was directed by Eric Le Roux. In 2004, she became one of the first freelance executive producers in France who works in other countries. In 2005, she founded a film production company. In 2006, she produced the film Josephine and the Shadows directed by Roland Topor and Reinhardt Wagner.

In 2014, Ramniceanu co-produced the documentary film OXI, an Act of Resistance directed by Ken McMullen. The film later received nominations for the Prix Sauvage Award for Best Feature Film at the 2016 Festival of European films in Paris. In 2017, she involved as a co-producer for the Djiboutian drama film Dhalinyaro directed by Lula Ali Ismaïl. It is the first feature film in Djibouti cinema history. The film received critical acclaim and won several awards at international film festivals including; Washington, D.C., New York City, Yaoundé, Cologne, and FIFDA. The film won the Best Film Award in the selection Regards sur la Relève at the Festival Vues d Africa in Montreal in 2019.

== Filmography ==
Year	Film	Role	Genre	Ref.
2014	OXI, an Act of Resistance	Producer	Documentary	
2018	Dhalinyaro	Producer, writer	Film	
