= Cinema of Djibouti =

The cinema of Djibouti refers to the film industry in Djibouti. According to UNESCO, the Djiboutian film industry struggles to exist.

== History ==
Storytelling is an ancient custom in the culture of Djibouti. Love of cinema is but a modern, visual incarnation and continuation of this well-established tradition. The earliest forms of public film display in Djibouti were in French. In the 1920s, the first local movie theaters opened, during a time when Djibouti City was growing in size. Film theaters became a place where local residents could watch movies in a relaxed atmosphere. With the development of the local film industry, additional theaters were launched. Among these establishments was the Eden in 1934, Olympia in 1939, Le Paris in 1965, and Al Hilal in 1975.

During the 1970s, the capital city had five movie theaters, with one in each district. Some local film making attempts were carried out with local actors. One was Burta Djinka, a 1972 film in Somali directed by G. Borg. Following independence in 1977, a growing number of government-owned production and distribution companies as well as actual projection theaters sprang up. In the 1990s two of the biggest cinemas, Odeon and Olympia, closed their doors. As of 2021, there were seven cinemas in the country.

In 2014, the first edition of the film festival 'Djibouti fait son cinéma" was organised by the Institut français de Djibouti, which focuses on screening French-language short films.

In 2019, director Lula Ali Ismaïl produced Dhalinyaro, a coming of age story about three Djiboutian teenage girls, which is sometimes considered the first Djiboutian feature film.

== Notable filmmakers ==
- Aïcha Mohamed Robleh
- Lula Ali Ismaïl

== Notable films ==
- Laan (2011)
- Dhalinyaro (2019)

== See also ==
- Arab cinema
