= Cinema of Jordan =

- No. of screens: 24 (2007)
  - Per capita: 0.5 per 100,000 (2007)

Number of admissions (2007)
- Total: 500,000

Gross box office (2007)
- Total: $3.9 million

Jordan has, in recent decades, established itself as an attractive destination for filmmaking for a number of reasons: its variety of locations, infrastructure, sunny weather, governmental support for the film industry, straightforward administrative procedures and financial incentives. A cash rebate is available, which varies between 10% and 25%, depending on spend, and productions are exempt from Jordanian taxes. Combined with the cash rebate, this means that productions may recoup up to 56%.

== International films filmed in Jordan ==
Lawrence of Arabia directed by David Lean and starring Peter O'Toole in 1962, shot in Wadi Rum.

Indiana Jones and the Last Crusade directed by Steven Spielberg and filmed in Petra in 1988.

The Hurt Locker directed by Kathryn Bigelow, which won six Academy Awards in 2010.

Redacted directed by Brian De Palma.

Transformers: Revenge of the Fallen directed by Michael Bay.

Fair Game directed by Doug Liman and starring Sean Penn and Naomi Watts.

Battle for Haditha directed by Nick Broomfield.

Star Wars: Episode IX – The Rise of Skywalker directed by J. J. Abrams.

The live-action Aladdin remake directed by Guy Ritchie and starring Will Smith.

Ridley Scott visited Jordan on several occasions to work on The Martian, All the Money in the World and Prometheus.

Following the success of his film Incendies, Denis Villeneuve shot large parts of Dune and Dune: Part 2 in Jordan.

== Local cinema industry ==
In parallel to the increasing number of international productions, the domestic cinema industry has also developed rapidly after a long dormant period that was mainly characterized by the production of TV series. A breakthrough came with the release of "Captain Abu Raed" in 2007 by Amin Matalqa, which was hailed as the first Jordanian film in decades. Many independent films followed, including "Transit Cities", "Recycle", "Blessed Benefit", "3000 Nights", and "Salma's Home".

In 2015, a Jordanian feature narrative film titled "Theeb", by Naji Abu Nowar, was short-listed at the 88th Academy Awards for Best Foreign Language Film. Also of note was the selection of the début feature "Inshallah a Boy" by Amjad Al-Rasheed at the Critics Week at Cannes Film Festival in 2023. The latter was strongly supported logistically and financially by the Royal Film Commission – Jordan. The recent success of ground-breaking films has given Jordanians faith that they can compete on the global stage with true and uncompromising cinema.

== Film incentives ==
The development of the local industry and the attractiveness of the Kingdom were largely crafted by The Royal Film Commission – Jordan (RFC), which was established in 2003 as a public institution, with the aim of encouraging filmmakers from Jordan and the region to express themselves through filmmaking and providing a place where people from the Middle East can freely make films in collaboration with the world's most talented filmmakers. Before the RFC, there were a few initiatives to support filmmakers at a smaller scale such as the Amman Filmmakers Cooperative. The RFC offers comprehensive production services, multiple training opportunities targeting different levels of filmmaking and organizes non-commercial screenings all year round. In addition, the RFC runs six film centers in the Kingdom. The RFC runs an annual fund of US$650,000. Several award-winning Jordanian movies were granted funds, such as: "Daughters of Abdul Rahman" by Zaid Abu Hamdan, "Farha" by Darin Sallam, "The Alleys" by Bassel Ghandour.

Other cinema-related initiatives in Jordan include the following:

- In 2008, the Red Sea Institute of Cinematic Arts, a graduate school offering a Master of Arts in Cinematic Arts, was established. Over 100 filmmakers graduated from RSICA, most of which are active as film and education professionals in Jordan and the region. The school was closed down six years later due to lack of funding.
- By 2023, Jordan has signed two co-production treaties: one with Canada and the second with the Flanders (Belgium).
- The Amman International Film Festival – Awal Film was established. It is the first international film festival of its kind in the Kingdom. It is mainly dedicated to first-time achievements in the domain of filmmaking, with a focus on Arab cinema. It quickly gained regional and international recognition.
- In 2023, Olivewood Studios, the first of its kind in Jordan, was opened 10 kilometers away from the center of Amman. They include two purpose-built soundstages totalling 3,000 m^{2}, along with production offices, wardrobe, equipment storage and green rooms. The completion of the studios and backlot (68,000 m^{2}) mark a new stage in the Kingdom's plans in the audio-visual sector.

== See also ==
- Arab cinema
- Egyptian cinema
- List of Jordanian films
- Cinema of the world
