= Cinematography studios of the Middle East =

Cinematography Studios of the Middle East refer to the film production companies within the geographical region commonly known as the Middle East.

== History ==
Cinema in the Middle East dates back to the early 1900s, following the advent of moving pictures in the late 19th century. Initial film studios were largely state-owned, with the objective of promoting national narratives and cultural identity. In the 1940s and 1950s, the 'Golden Age' of Middle Eastern cinema emerged, primarily from Egypt, which is dubbed the "Hollywood of the East." Studios like Studio Misr and Al-Ahram played an instrumental role in the proliferation of Middle Eastern cinema, producing influential films like "The White Rose" (1933) and "The Song of Hope" (1937). The 1960s to 1980s saw a decline in film production due to various political and economic factors. However, the 1990s marked a resurgence with the advent of the Iranian New Wave and the establishment of new film studios such as Majid Majidi's Film Workshop.

== Major studios ==
- Studio Misr (Egypt)
- Egyptian Media Production City (Egypt)
- Majid Majidi's Film Workshop (Iran)
- Image Nation Abu Dhabi (UAE)
- Royal Film Commission (Jordan)

== See also ==
- Cinema of the Middle East
- Iranian New Wave
- Arab cinema
