= Bits of What I Have =

- Directed by: Saleh Sharif
- Written by: Saleh Sharif
- Story by: Saleh Sharif
- Produced by: Ibrahmem AlRabeh
- Starring: Bahadır Elmas; Mustafa Akyıldız; Yudum Yelda Akyıldız; Mehmet Kutlukan
- Cinematography: Emrah Karakurum
- Edited by: Diren Can Oztemel
- Production companies: Marsala Studio Saudi Arabia, Bicycle Films Bahrain
- Release date: 2015
- Running time: 60 minutes
- Country: Bahrain
- Language: Turkish
- Budget: US$12000

Bits of What I Have is a Bahraini movie shot in Turkey, The film is produced by Ibrahem AlRabeh and Zeeshan Jawed Shah, and is written and directed by Saleh Sharif. The film is about two days in the life of an ageing writer who is in the brink of extinction and a youthful soul who is in utter need of inspiration and happens to seek it in the arms of an anguished writer.

== Synopsis ==
The film follows two days in the lives of an aguing writer and young person seeking inspiration who becomes involved with him. The older man was writer who was well known in his generation, but following the deaths of his wife and daughter, he has been unable to complete his book .He has become increasingly bitter towards the world and the people around him. The book he was working on is regarded as comparable to his earlier work, and possibly of greater quality.The man has not left his house for a long time and refuses to participate in social activities. He has withdrawn into his home, where he engages in the act of vandalism within his private space.

Though the world must have forgotten him and his words, there still resides a young man who has found bliss in his company but due to certain circumstances has not been able to visit the writer for about two weeks now.

The young man happens to be a teacher in a school teaching children English literature and tries to inspire his students with inadequate or rather grim methods. He is married to a young woman who tries to keep him happy with what she knows of happiness.

The young couple is expecting their first child and instead of getting closer they move further apart from each other. Their relationship is tested when the young man starts to see the world from the old man's gloomy perceptive and starts to question his place in society and in this world.

As the old man and the young man argue and question their place in society, they find out that they both aren't that further apart from each other. Though they have lived in a different time and era but their outlook towards the decaying world and humanity remains the same.

The meaning of existence and one's right to their own free will are reflected in the film. And the question that “is one truly the master of his own craft?” is touched during the course of the film.

== Cast ==
- Bahadır Elmas as Young Teacher
- Mustafa Akyıldız as Old Writer
- Yudum Yelda Akyıldız as Young Teacher's Wife
- Mehmet Kutlukan as Young Teacher's Father in Law
- Semra Engin as Young Teacher's Mother in Law
- Mehmet Senyer as Young Teacher's in Laws
- Erdi Kabakuşak as Young Teacher's in Laws
- Güleycan Düzgün as Young Teacher's in Laws

== Crew ==
- Saleh Shairf Director & Writer
- Ibrahem AlRabeh Producer
- Zeeshan Jawed Shah Co-Producer
- Nurcan Bektas script translator
- Zahid Balooshi, Nurcan Bektas, and Saleh Shairf Associate Producers
- Emrah Karakurum Cinematographer
- Diren Can Oztemel Editor
- Güleycan Düzgün and Erdi Kabakusak Production Designer
- Erdi Kabakusak Art Director
- Güleycan Düzgün Costume Designer
- Zahid Balooshi Assistant Director
- Ekrem Ekici Camera Assistant
- Mertkan Kaya Steadi-Cam Operator
- Diren Can Oztemel Focus Puller
