= Cinema of Galicia =

Cinematography in Galicia refers to films made in Galicia or by Galicia-related filmmakers. Galician cinema consists of films in Galician language, although the majority of those productions is also (partially or totally) made in Spanish. To a lesser extent, some Galician films include Portuguese-Galician coproductions, such as The Rye Horn, some using Portuguese-language.

== History ==
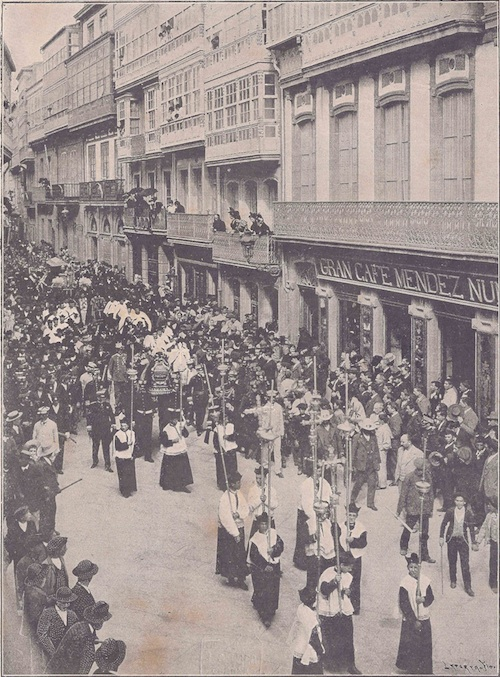
Photograph taken in A Coruñaat the time of the filming of Entierro del General Sánchez Bregua (1897)

=== Until the Spanish Civil War ===
After the arrival to Galicia of the first film projectors, there were some pioneer filmmakers who worked in the region. The first operator to film in Galicia was José Sellier. This photographer from A Coruña, of French origin, bought a cinematograph from the Lumière brothers with which he exhibited films in his studio on rue de Santo André in A Coruña. For the shows he shot the first Galician films, such as Orzán, oleaje, Fábrica de gas or Plaza de Mina. Entierro del General Sánchez Bregua stands out among them since it is possible to know the date of filming, June 20, 1897.

Among the first notable filmmakers to have worked in Galicia are Xosé Gil (Miss Ledyia, 1916) or José Signo (La tragedia de Xirobio, 1930). Spanish films of the time set in Galicia include La Casa de la Troya and were filmed on location, or works of foreign directors, such as Carmiña, flower of Galicia carried out by the Italian Rino Lupo (although the interior scenes were carried out in Porto).

=== Spanish Civil War – 1975 ===
There are documentaries on the topics of emigration and exile (rescued, for some of them, at the end of the 20th century). The more distinguished figure among Galician documentary filmmakers of that time is Carlos Velo (1909–1988). Before being exiled during the Spanish Civil War, he made documentary shorts, before moving to Mexico, where he became a prominent film director. Other prominent Galician film personalities of the time include the actor Fernando Rey and the director and writer Manuel Mur Oti.

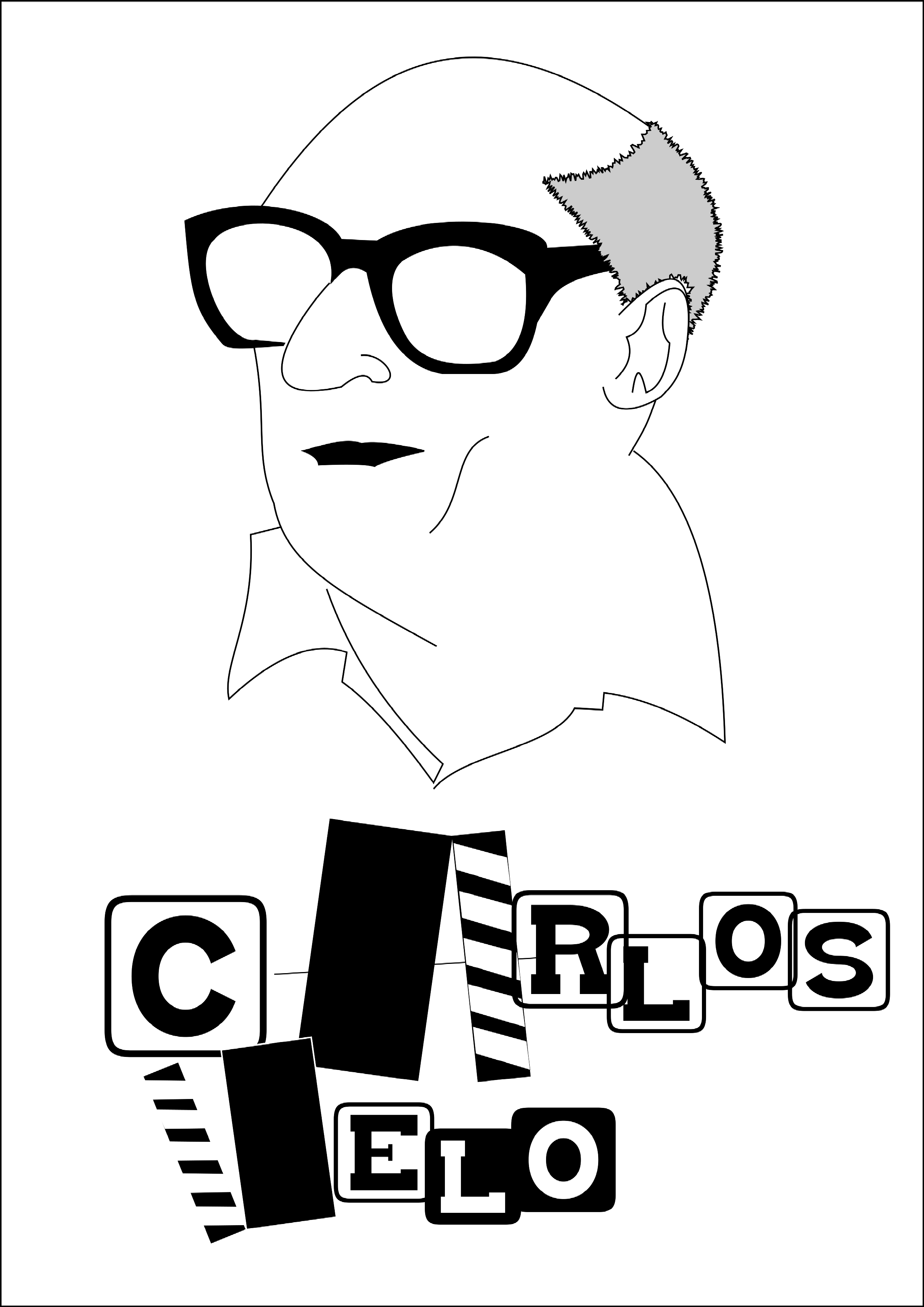
Carlos Velo, a prominent figure of Galician cinema.

=== New Galician Cinema ===
From the late 1990s onwards, several Galician actors contributed to the notoriety of Galician cinema; they include Tamar Novas, breakthrough actor at the Goya Awards for his role in Mar adentro (2004), Tacho González, Luís Tosar, Manuel Manquiña, Javier Gutiérrez, winner of the Best actor award at the San Sebastián International Film Festival and the Goya Awards, Nerea Barros, breakthrough actress at the Goya Awards for her role in La isla minima (2014), Fran Lareu, Federico Pérez Rey, María Bouzas, Manuel Burque, breakthrough actor at the Cinematographic Writers Circle Medals for his role Requirements to be a normal person (2015), Mónica Camaño, Cristina Castaño, Xúlio Abonjo, Christian Escuredo, recognized for his participation in the Portuguese film Assalto ao Santa María (2008), Santi Prego, Alfonso Agra, Chechu Salgado, recognized for his role in the series Pátria (2020), Mario Casas, Nancho Novo or Eva Fernández.

==== Animation ====
Since the early 2000s animation has become an important part of the Galician film industry. Animation films produced in Galicia include O bosque animal (2001; 509.132 spectators as of 2004).

== Films shot in Galicia ==
- The Blind Sunflowers, filmed in Ourense
- Julieta: Almodovar's film was partially shot in Ares and Mugardos
- The Beasts

== Biggest box office successes ==
Sempre Xonxa was, during 20 years, the biggest theatrical success for a film in Galician, until 2019 when Fire Will Come eventually attracted more spectators.
