= Bader Ben Hirsi =

Al-Bader Ben Yahya al-Hirsi, commonly known as Bader Ben Hirsi, (Arabic: بدر بن هرسي, born 1968) is an English playwright and director of Yemeni ancestry.

== Early life and education ==
Hirsi's father, Yahya al-Hirsi al-Ban, was from the city of Lahij. Al-Ban moved from Yemen to Britain in the 1960s, and it was in that country that Bader Ben Hirsi was born and raised, along with six brothers and seven sisters. Hirsi received a degree in business from the University of Buckingham, and worked in London as an investment banker for several years. However, he decided to move into drama, and received a degree in drama production from Goldsmiths College, part of the University of London. Three of his plays, A Boring Affair, Claptrap, and On the Side of the Angels, were performed at the Edinburgh Fringe in Edinburgh, Scotland.

One of his sisters married Prince Muhammad al-Badr as his third wife.

== Professional career ==
In 1995, Hirsi visited Yemen for the first time, and in 1996, he married a native Yemeni woman. In 1998 he had his first daughter, Thea and two years later another daughter, Lana, then a son, Xane in 2004. In 2000, Hirsi released the documentary The English Sheikh and the Yemeni Gentleman, which he directed and produced with the help of British expatriate Tim Mackintosh-Smith.

In 2005, he released A New Day in Old Sana'a (a romantic drama shot in Sanaa, the capital), which became the first feature-length film to be shot in Yemen and the first Yemeni film to be shown at the Cannes Film Festival. Hirsi himself had a cameo as a djinni at the end of the film. After the film won the award for best Arabic film at the Cairo International Film Festival, Egypt's Ministry of Culture presented him with an award of £E100,000 for "his role in promoting Arabic films."
