= A New Day in Old Sana'a =

2005 Yemeni film by Bader Ben Hirsi

- Film poster
- Directed by: Bader Ben Hirsi
- Written by: Hirsi
- Produced by: Ahmed Abdali
- Cinematography: Muriel Aboulrouss
- Edited by: Andrew Lloyd
- Distributed by: Felix Films Entertainment Limited
- Release date: 2005
- Running time: 86 minutes
- Country: Yemen
- Languages: English; Arabic

A New Day in Old Sana'a is a 2005 romantic drama film directed by Bader Ben Hirsi, a British playwright and director of Yemeni ancestry, and produced by Ahmed Abdali. It was shot in Sanaa, the capital of Yemen, and was the first Yemeni film to be shown at the Cannes Film Festival.

The film was advertised as the first film to come out of Yemen.

The running time of the film was 86 minutes, and versions were released in English and Arabic (with English subtitles).

In addition to Cannes, the film was screened at the Cairo International Film Festival; after its showing in Cairo, Hirsi received a prize of £E100,000 from the Egyptian Ministry of Culture.

== Plot ==
The film is shown through the eyes of Federico, a photographer from Italy. Tariq (a friend of Federico) is scheduled to marry Bilquis, the daughter of a rich judge. However, while out in the city one night, he catches sight of a woman he believes to be Bilquis, and falls in love with her. The woman turns out to be a nagsh (a black plant applied like henna) artist named Ines, and Tariq ends up having to choose between the two. The film ends with a shot of a jinn, played by Hirsi himself.

== Cast ==
- Sahar Alasbahi as Amal
- Dania Hammoud as Ines
- Redha Khoder as Bilquis
- Paolo Romano as Federico
- Nabil Saber as Tariq
- Bader Ben Hirsi as a djinn
