= Cinema of Oman =

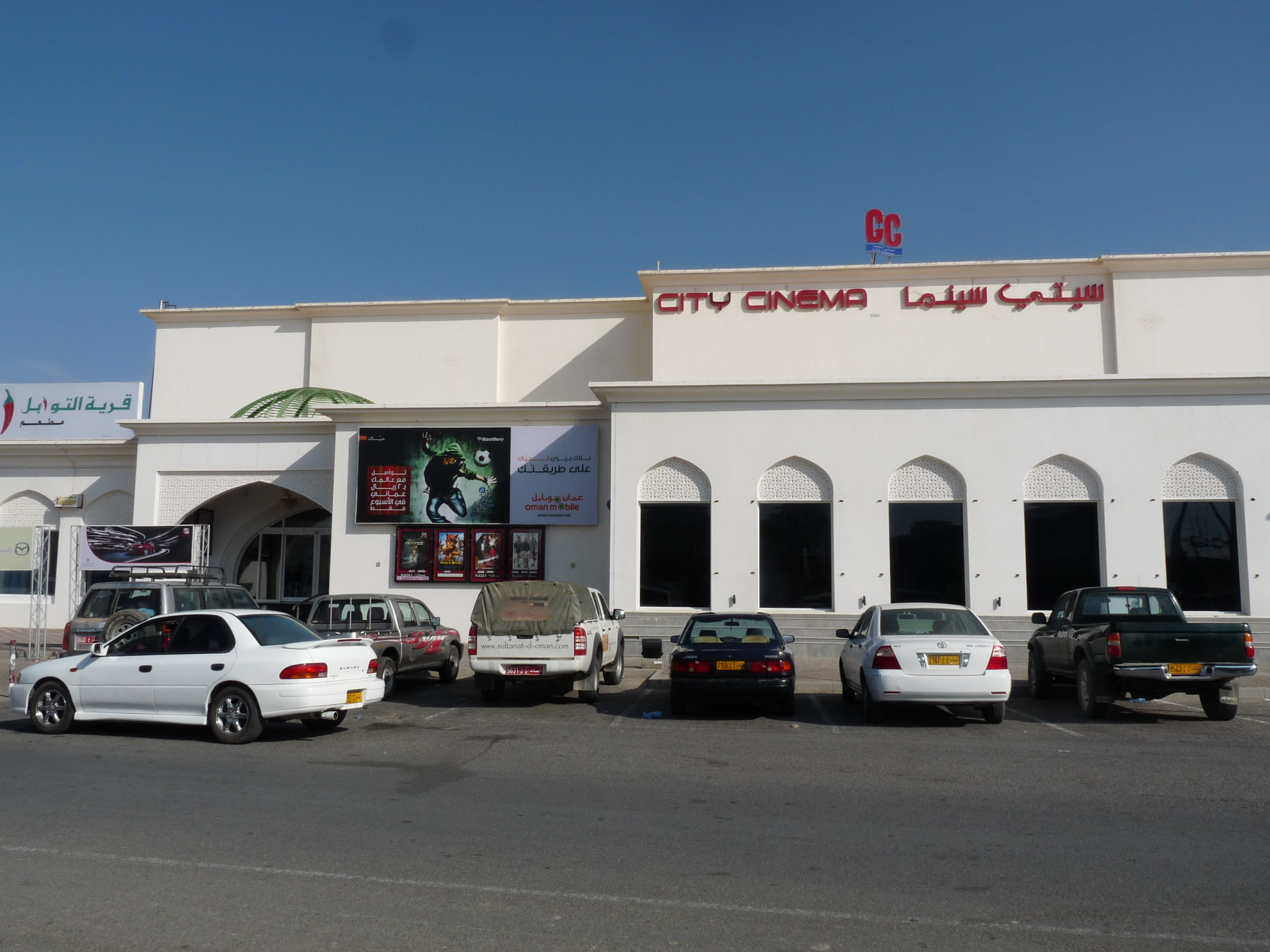
- Cinema in Sur

Gross box office (2012)
- Total: $1.3 million

The cinema of Oman is very small. There is only one Omani film, Al-Boom (2006), as of 2007. Partly inspired by Samuel Beckett's Waiting For Godot, Al-Boom deals with the challenges facing a small fishing community.

A joint US-Indian-Omani production, Pirate's Blood, starring Sunny Leone was co-produced by Stegath Dorr in 2008. Stegath Dorr's film Blood Desert was released in 2014, many years after it premiered at the 2006 Oman Film Festival. A few Hollywood movies have been partly filmed in the country.

An annual film festival is held in Muscat.

== Films shot in Oman ==
- Blood Desert (filmed in 2006)
- Killer Elite (2011)
- Operation Oman (2014)
- Pirate's Blood (Hollywood) (2010)
- Given more than i had (Bollywood, Director - Renny Johnson) (2016)
- Personal Shopper (Hollywood) (2016)
- Once Upon ay Time in Mumbai Dobaara! (2013)
- Agent_(film) (2023)
- Dard (2024)

== See also ==
- Arab cinema
- Cinema of West Asia
- Cinema of the world
