= Dead Sands =

Dead Sands (film)
- Directed by: Ameera Al Qaed
- Written by: Ahmed Zayani
- Produced by: Ameera Al Qaed; Ahmed Zayani; Noor Al Ebrahim
- Starring: Bu Idrees Mughal; Fatima Senay Dincsoy; Miraya Varma
- Cinematography: Ameera Al Qaed; Ahmed Kooheji
- Edited by: Ameera Al Qaed
- Music by: Various Artists
- Production companies: Fantasy Features; NYIT
- Release date: November 20, 2013
- Running time: 97 minutes
- Country: Bahrain
- Languages: English, Arabic, Urdu
- Budget: BHD 5K (estimated)

Dead Sands is a Bahraini multi-lingual horror-comedy film directed by Ameera Al Qaed and produced by Zeeshan Jawed Shah, Ameera Al Qaed, Ahmed Zayani, and Noor Al Ebrahim, starring various debuting actors. The screenplay is written by Ahmed Zayani. The film is widely regarded as being the first zombie film produced in Bahrain. The film is sponsored by Ahmed Zayani and Sons, Bahrain Cinema Company, and NYIT Bahrain, Dead Sands' media sponsor is local youth magazine CoEds and Daily Tribune.

== Plot ==
In the wake of a viral outbreak throughout Bahrain, a group of strangers become acquainted with each other when they realize that they must unite to ward off the undead plague.

== Cast ==
- Şenay Dincsoy as May
- Miraya Varma as Samara
- Bu Idrees Mughal as Wolf
- Abdulwahab Basil as Friday
- Aysha Burashid as Dahlia
- Nujood Al Mahmood as Dr. Farah
- Ahmed Al-Qaed as Abdulrahman
- Heba Hisham as Reem
- Mahdi Rafea as Mahdi
- Emad Al-Jeri as Fahad
- Baraa Abdulla as Baraa
- Noor Nooruddin as Sara
- Saleh Al-Derazi as Jamal
- Ahmed Zayani as TJ
- Mohammed Zayani as Damien
- Mohammed Junaid as Junaid
- Lubna Hussain Kazmi as Lana
- Mohammed Zubari as Jassim
- Zeeshan Jawed Shah as Aslam
- Omar Ashraf
- Noora Khan as Sana
- Saleh Al-Saati as Salman
- Anne Mary as Tooms
- Mila K. Killer as Mila
- Maha Al Zaidy as Girl in the Umm Hamar part
- Alex as Alex
- Yousaf Zarka as Joe
