= Abdellah Rezzoug =

Libyan film director

- Born: Libyan
- Occupation: filmmaker
- Notable work: When Fate Hardens *Symphony of Rain

Abdellah Rezzoug or Abdella Zarok was a Libyan filmmaker. In the early 1970s he made the first Libyan feature film, When Fate Hardens.

== Films ==
- When Fate Hardens / Destiny Is Hard (Indama Yaqsu al-Zaman), 1973.
- Symphony of Rain (Ma’azufatu al-matar), 1991.
