= Frenkel brothers =

Three Egyptian Jewish brothers that pioneered animated film in Egypt

Frankel brothers

The Frenkel brothers were three Egyptian Jewish brothers – Herschel Frenkel (1902–1972), Salomon "Shlomo" Frenkel (1912–2001), and David Frenkel (1914–1994) – who pioneered animated film in Egypt. Their first successful film, Mafish Fayda (1936), made its protagonist Mish-Mish Effendi the first Arab cartoon star. After Israel's declaration of independence, the brothers emigrated to France. There they continued to make films, but without the success they had enjoyed in Egypt. They made over thirty films in total.

== Early life ==
=== Egypt ===
Herschel, Shlomo and David were three of six brothers born into a family of Belarusian Jewish origins. Their father Bezalel was a furniture maker with a big commercial success; however, after experiencing indiscriminate violence directed at Jews (a pogram) in czarist Russia, the family emigrated to Palestine, then part of the Ottoman Empire. In 1914, with the outbreak of World War I, the Frenkel family was once again forced to leave or face persecution and the family moved to Egypt from Jerusalem.

Their first film, Marco Monkey was strongly criticized by Al Ahram in 1936. As a result, they hired collaborators to improve their later work. At the National Festival of Egyptian Cinema in 1936, they showcased eight black-and-white animated shorts, documentaries and advertising spots. Mafish faida (1936), introducing the character Mish Mish Effendi, was a huge success, and stayed in Egyptian cinemas until 1939. The character's success led to demand from the government for use in national propaganda films. National defence, screened in 1940, was in support of efforts to modernize the Egyptian army. Enjoy your food! was another Mish Mish short, set in a circus. The brothers made about a dozen Mishmish Effenfi cartoons. After the war the brothers also started to make commercials: Bravo Osman was a commercial for Vim powder.

=== France ===
After Israel’s independence in 1948, Jews were expelled from Egypt and the Frenkel family moved to Paris, where the brothers tried to make a French version of Mish Mish, Mimiche, who wore a beret instead of a fez. The brothers continued producing a film a year, pairing Mimiche with another character Jenny, who was later combined with a character called Danny. However, they did not find commercial success. They also continued making commercials. In Atomic Experience, a mad scientist throws the world off balance, sending the Eiffel Tower, Arc de Triomphe, the Egyptian Pyramids and the Sphinx all into the air.

== Film rediscovery ==
The Egyptian movies of the Frenkel brothers were rediscovered in 1995, and restored for presentation at several film festivals. The brothers were the subject of a 2019 documentary Bukra fil Mish-Mish, directed by Tal Michael.

== Mish Mish Effendi ==
Mish Mish Effendi
- Mish Mish Effendi character
- First appearance: Mafish Fayda (1936)
- Last appearance: Mon Chien, mon ame et moi (1953)
- Created by: Frenkel brothers
- Designed by: David Frenkel
- Voiced by: Frenkel brothers

In-universe information
- Gender: Male
- Nationality: Egyptian

Mish Mish Effendi is an Egyptian Character created by the Frenkel Brothers and is the first Arab character. MIsh Mish Effendi debuted in the short "Mafish Fayda" in 1936. his last appearance was in the short "Mon chien, mon ame et moi" in the 1950s. Mish mish effendi had 7 films that was produced between 1936 and the 1953.

Here's a list of Mish Mish effendi shorts:

=== 1936 ===
No.	Title	Release date	Country
01	Mafish Fayda (It's useless / Nothing to do)	1936	Egypt

=== 1939 ===
No.	Title	Release date	Country
02	Mish Mish el shater (Mish Mish The Brave)	1939	Egypt

=== 1940 ===
No	Title	Release date	Country
03	Al difau `al watani (National Defense)	1939	Egypt

=== 1946 ===
No.	Title	Release date	Country
04	Bilhana oushefa (enjoy your food / bon apetit)	1946	Egypt

=== 1948 ===
No.	Title	Release date	Country
05	Mish mish yarqus ma'a a Sabah	1948	Egypt

=== 1950 ===
No.	Title	Release date	Country
06	Abu ras nashfa	1950	Egypt

=== 1950s ===
No.	Title	Release date	Country
07	Mon Chien, mon ame et moi	1953	France

== All Films ==
- Marco Monkey un singe sympa, 1935.
- Mafish Fayda (It's Useless/Nothing To Do), 1936.
- Mish Mish el shater (Mish Mish the Brave), 1939.
- Al difau `al watani (National Defence), 1940
- Bilhana Oushefa (Enjoy your Food / Bon Appétit), 1946
- Bravo Osman, 1949/1950. Screened at the 19th Torino Film Festival, 2001.
- Simfoniyya ala difaf al Nil, 1949
- Sunlight, 1949
- Abu ras nashfa, 1950
- Al walad al nagib (The prodigal son). Commercial, 1951.
- Une expérience atomique (Atomic Adventure). Commercial, 1954.
- Aventures et fantaisies
- Mon chien, mon âme et moi, 1953
- Oeil Pour Oeil
- C'est arrivé au zoo, 1954
- Le stylo magique
- Le grand triomphe
- Noël parisien
- La Bolte magique
- Le Trésor insaisissable
- Reve du Beau Danube bleu (Dream of the Beautiful Blue Danube), 1964
