= Lula Ali Ismaïl =

Djibouti-Canadian filmmaker

- Born: 1978 (age 46–47); Djibouti
- Occupations: Director; writer; actress
- Years active: 2011–present

Lula Ali Ismaïl (Somali: Luula Cali Ismaaciil) (born 1978) is a Djibouti-Canadian film director and screenwriter. She is the first woman from Djibouti to produce a film, earning her the nickname of the "first lady of Djibouti cinema." Her first film, a fiction short titled Laan (2011) was screened at the 2012 Vues d'Afrique festival in Montreal, and at FESPACO in 2013. Her second film and first feature, Dhalinyaro, was co-written with Alexandra Ramniceanu and Marc Wels and released in 2017. A co-production between Djibouti, France, Canada and Somalia, and entirely filmed in Djibouti, it is the country's first feature film.

== Biography ==
Ali Ismail was born in Djibouti in 1978 to an Issa family, and in 1992 settled in Montreal, Quebec, Canada, as part of a wave of immigrants who left the poor and politically unstable African country. The youngest of eight children, she studied office automation, and worked as a legal assistant for seven years, but developed an interest in the world of acting and cinema, and began to take courses on the subject. At first, she played minor roles at several television series in Quebec, but found more interest in filmmaking.

== Career ==
In 2012, Ali Ismail created her opera prima, a short film (27 minutes) called Laan (Friends), a story about Souad, Oubah and Ayane, three young women in Djibouti who chew on qat and seek love. Ali Ismail also played one of the lead roles in it. The film described everyday life in her country. It was the first film directed by a woman from Djibouti. Ali Ismail relates that the funds needed for this film were raised mainly with the help of her family and friends. When she arrived in Djibouti, she contacted the Ministry of Culture for support, but the government did not have a budget for such projects. Nevertheless, she carried on with the project, thus setting the cornerstone of a film industry in the country. The film has been shown at different festivals in Africa, Europe and North America, and has been well received by the critics.

In 2014, Ali Ismail filmed her first full-length movie, Dhalinyaro (Youth). The film follows three young women from different socio-economic backgrounds. It was supported by the Organisation internationale de la Francophonie, and was co-produced in Canada, Somalia, France and Djibouti, where it was filmed in its entirety. The film was premiered in 2017 in Djibouti, and it was attended by the ministers of Education, Communication and Culture.

In July 2024, it was announced that Ali Isamail would direct the screen adaption of The Youth of God, a novel by Somali-Canadian author Hassan Ghedi Santur. The novel was longlisted for Canada Reads in 2020 and was a finalist for the 2019 Pius Adesanmi Memorial Award for Excellence in African Writing.

== Filmography ==
- Laan, 2011
- Dhalinyaro / Jeunesse [Youth], 2017
