= Dhalinyaro =

2018 Franco–Djiboutian film

- Directed by: Lula Ali Ismaïl
- Written by: Lula Ali Ismaïl; Alexandra Ramniceanu; Marc Wels
- Produced by: Lula Ali Ismaïl; Alexandra Ramniceanu; Jean-Frédéric Samie; Gilles Sandoz
- Starring: Amina Mohamed Ali; Tousmo Mouhoumed Mohamed; Bilan Samir Moubus
- Cinematography: Jean-Christophe Beauvallet
- Edited by: Sylviane Gozin
- Music by: Philippe Jakko
- Production company: Samawada Films
- Release date: July 2017
- Running time: 86 minutes
- Country: Djibouti
- Language: French

Dhalinyaro (Youth) is a 2017 Djiboutian drama film directed by Lula Ali Ismaïl where she became the first Djiboutian film director. It is co-produced by Ali Ismaïl along with Alexandra Ramniceanu, Jean-Frédéric Samie and Gilles Sandoz for Samawada Films. The film stars Amina Mohamed Ali, Tousmo Mouhoumed Mohamed, and Bilan Samir Moubus in main roles. It is the first feature film in Djibouti cinema history which had its premiere in July 2017.

The film follows three young women from different socio-economic backgrounds. It was supported by the Organisation internationale de la Francophonie, and was co-produced in Canada, Somalia, France and Djibouti. It was filmed entirety in Djibouti. The film received critical acclaim and won several awards at international film festivals.

== Cast ==
- Amina Mohamed Ali as Deka
- Tousmo Mouhoumed Mohamed as Asma
- Bilan Samir Moubus as Hibo
