= Roy Armes =

British film scholar

Roy Armes (born March 16, 1937) is a British professor emeritus and film scholar who has written numerous books on the history of filmmaking and select filmmakers.

He wrote a treatise on the film Omar Gatlato and books on Alain Robbe-Grillet and Alain Resnais.

== Books ==
- Armes, Roy (1966). French Cinema Since 1946. Vol. 1. ISBN 9789100031961.
- Armes, Roy (1966). French Cinema Since 1946. Vol. 2.
- Armes, Roy (1968). The Cinema of Alain Resnais.
- Armes, Roy (1976). The ambiguous image: Narrative style in modern European cinema. Bloomington, Ind. [usw.]: Univ. Pr. ISBN 9784366018008. OCLC 902125049.
- Armes, Roy (1978). A critical history of the British cinema. New York: Oxford Univ. Press. ISBN 978-0-19-520043-0.
- Armes, Roy (1987). Third World Film Making and the West. University of California Press. ISBN 9780520908017.
- Armes, Roy (2001). On video. Studies in communication (Repr ed.). London: Routledge. ISBN 978-0-415-00717-7.
- Armes, Roy (2005). Postcolonial Images: Studies in North African Film. Indiana University Press. ISBN 9780253217448.
- Armes, Roy (2006). African Filmmaking: North and South of the Sahara. Indiana University Press. ISBN 9780253218988.
- Armes, Roy (2008). Dictionary of African filmmakers. Bloomington, Ind.: Indiana University Press. ISBN 978-0-253-35116-6.
- Armes, Roy (2010). Arab Filmmakers of the Middle East: A Dictionary. Indiana University Press. ISBN 9780253004598.
- Armes, Roy (2015). New voices in Arab cinema. Bloomington, Ind: Indiana University press. ISBN 978-0-253-01516-7.
