= Cinema of Eritrea =

The history of cinema in Eritrea dates back to the country's colonial rule under the Kingdom of Italy.

== History ==
A small theater, Cinema Dante, set up shop in Asmara in 1910, making it one of the first "movie theaters" in Africa.

The Italian missionary film was first introduced in a 1922 work produced in the country by Capuchin monks collaborating with the colonial government. In connection with the growth of Italian cinema in the 1930s, so too did the rise of cinema occur in Asmara, Eritrea. In 1937, Asmara's Opera was converted into a dual-use theatre and cinema. By the following year, Asmara had a total of nine movie theatres, all Art Deco.

Cinema Roma was for whites-only until 1941 when the Italians were ousted. After 1941, the theater mainly played Indian movies. Many Eritrean actors moved to Italy, contributing to Italy’s post-war "Movie Boom for Negro Actors".

After cable TV and movie streaming was deployed, the interest to view foreign movies lowered. Many cinemas reconverted in showing domestic productions only, and European soccer games.

Despite the country's independence, film screenings in Eritrea are mostly still confined to English and Italian language movies.

During the armed conflicts of the 1990s, a community of amateur movie makers was created around the socio-drama the events. The first Eritrean movie subtitled in English was Minister (written by Efrem Kahsay), but Barud 77 (1996, dir. Bereket Yohannes) is considered Eritrea's first feature film.

== Gallery ==
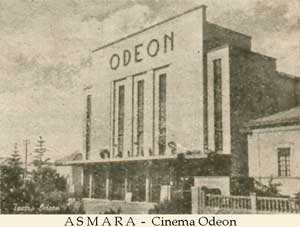
Cinema Odeon, 1930s.

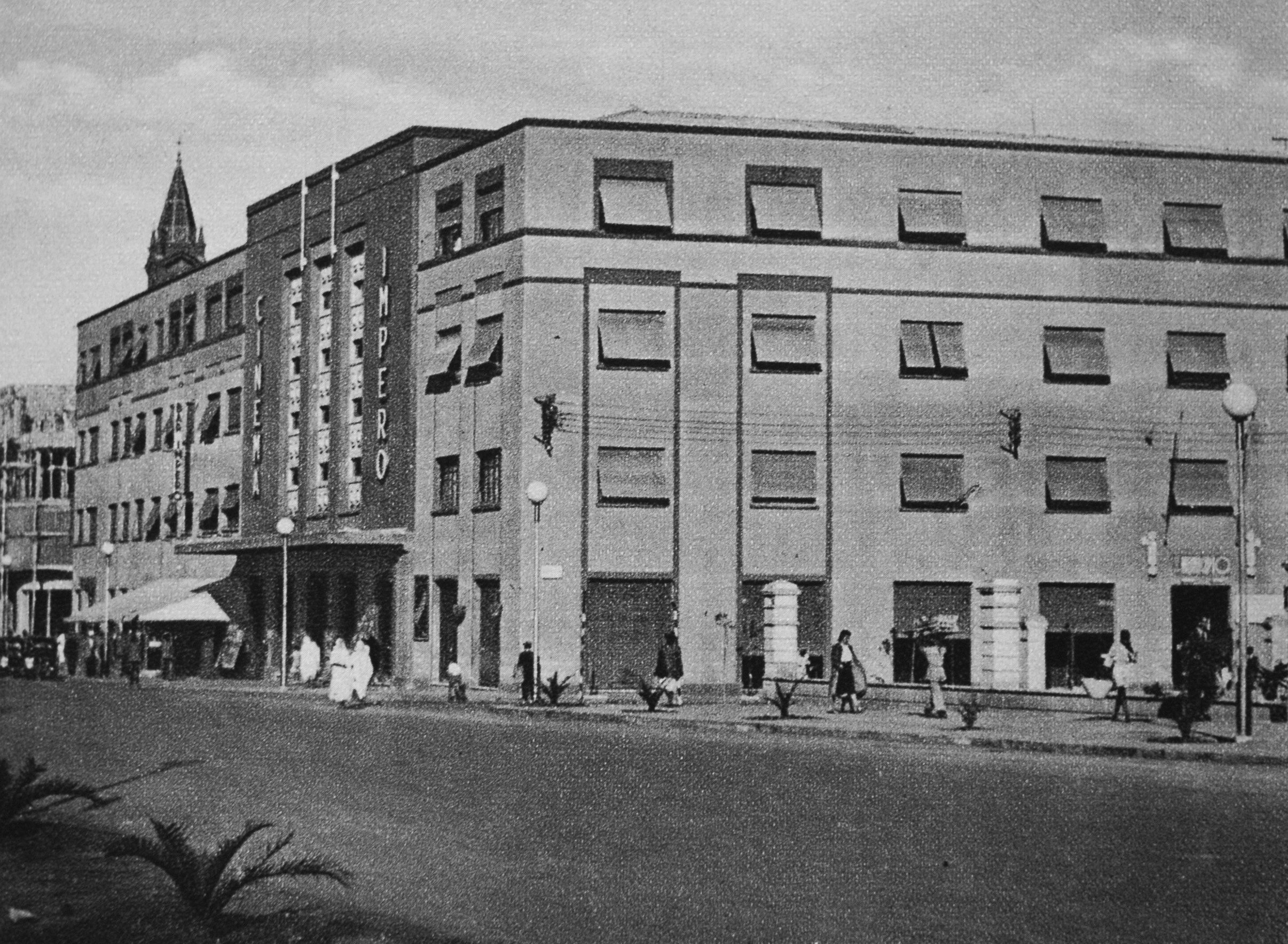
Cinema Impero, Asmara, 1930s.

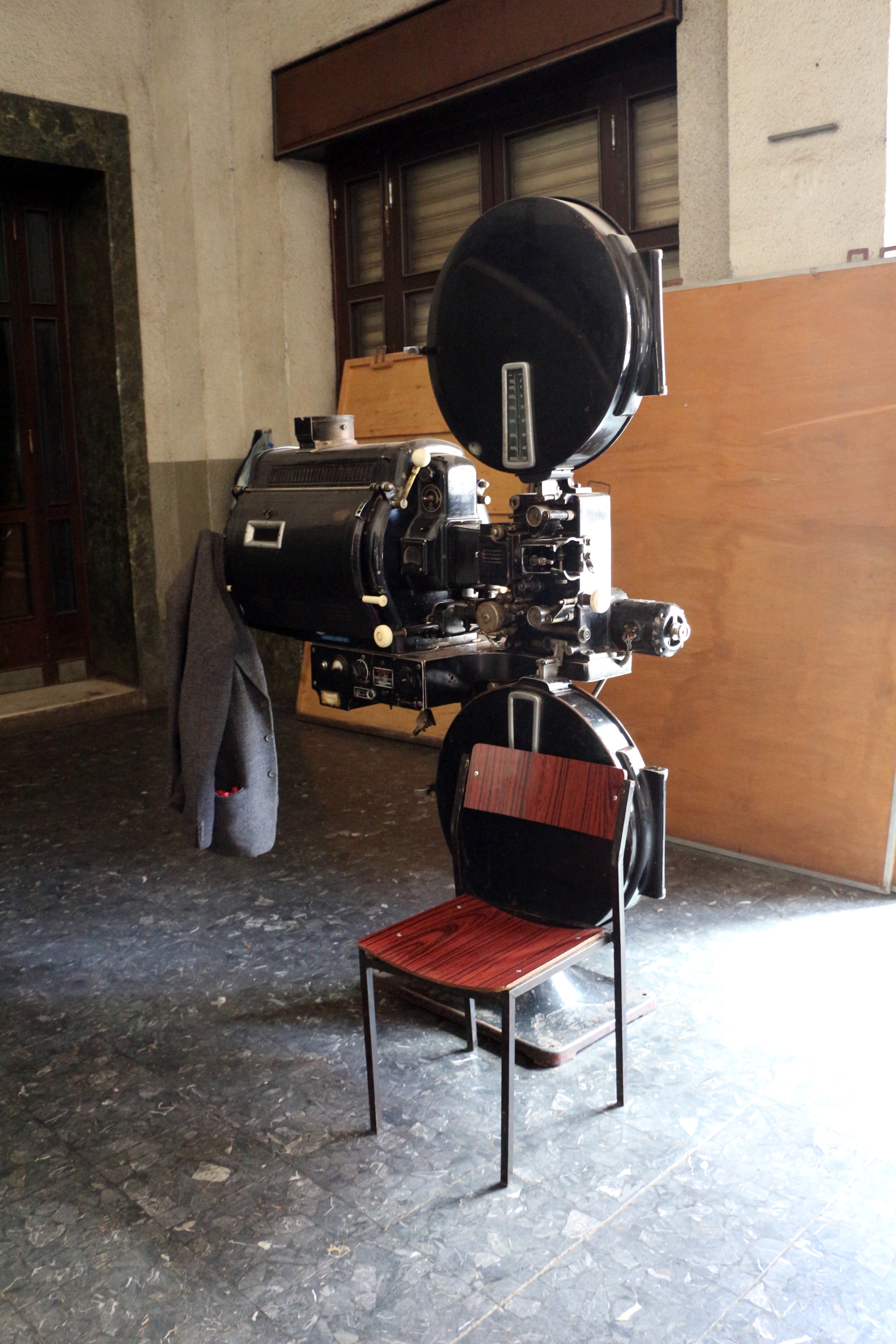
Old camera constructed in Cinema Impero.

== Production ==
Films like Eva Nera were produced in Eritrea and shown the culture and differences between the Eritrean people. Directed by Giuliano Tomei, it was told through a viewpoint of Domenico Meccoli.

European influence continues to this day, such as "European Film Weeks", which have been held annually for the last 15 years. Almost 100% of the films produced in Eritrea fall under the "Fiction" category.

The National Union of Eritrean Youth and Students owns three cinemas, including The Impero cinema, but there is no film school per se in the country. The government gets involved in financing film projects, but only those that demonstrate a moral stance.

== See also ==
- Arab cinema
- Cinema Impero
