= Roberto Vidal Bolaño =

Galician playwright and actor

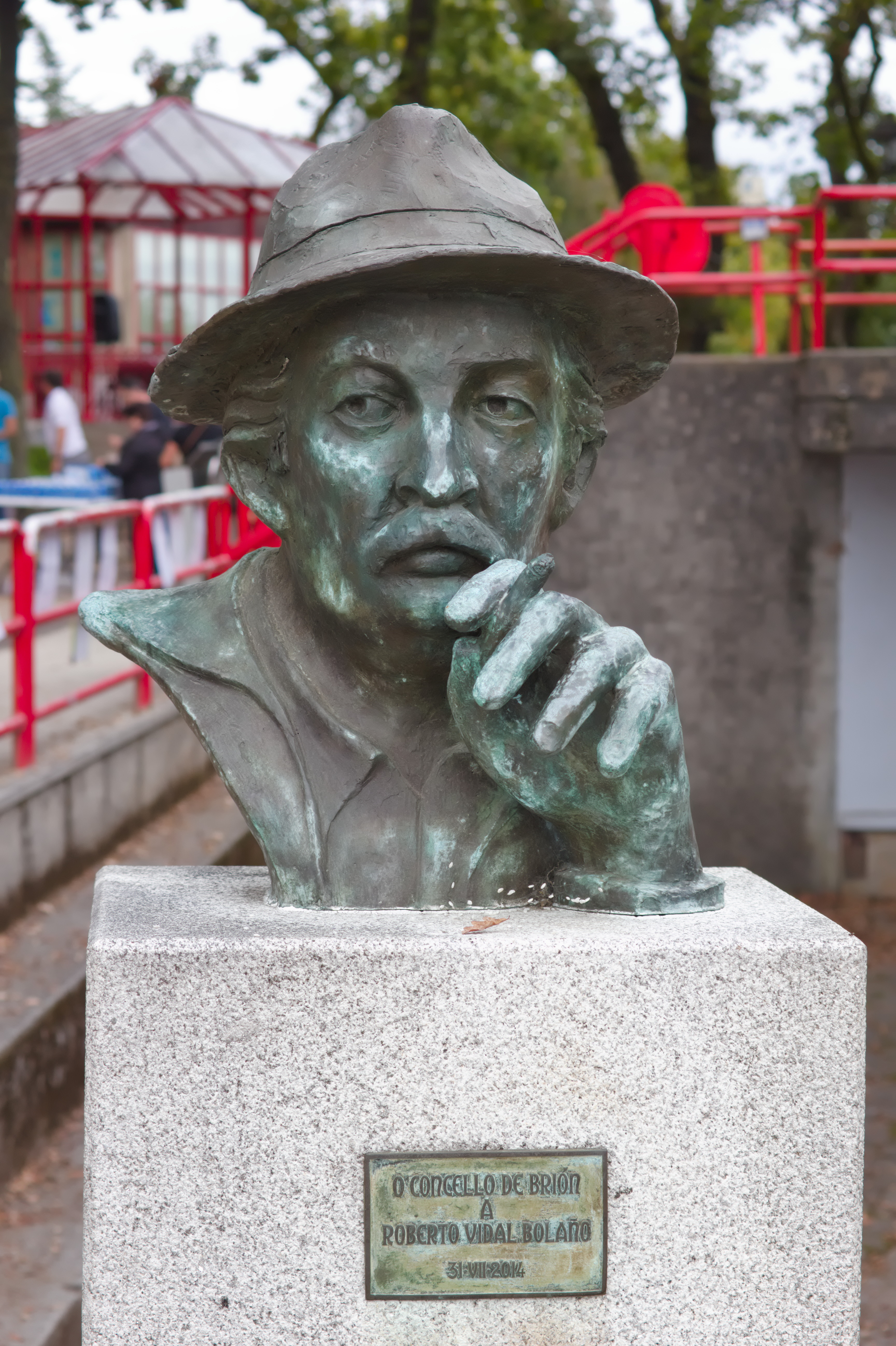
- Born: Roberto Vidal Bolaño; 31 July 1950; Santiago de Compostela, Galicia
- Died: 11 September 2002 (aged 52); Santiago de Compostela, Galicia
- Occupations: Writer, actor
- Spouse(s): Laura Ponte Santasmarinas; Belén Quintáns López
- Children: Roi Vidal Ponte; Carme Vidal Quintáns

Roberto Vidal Bolaño (31 July 1950 – 11 September 2002) was a Galician playwright and actor. Galician Literature Day is dedicated to him in 2013.

== Works ==
- Laudamuco, señor de Ningures (1976, Pico Sacro) ISBN 978-84-85170-16-6.
- Bailadela da morte ditosa (1980, 1992, Sotelo Blanco) ISBN 84-86021-97-9.
- Agasallo de sombras (1992, El Correo Gallego) ISBN 978-84-85553-97-6.
- Cochos (1992, Sotelo Blanco) ISBN 978-84-7824-071-5.
- Días sen gloria (1992, Deputación da Coruña) ISBN 978-84-86040-63-5.
- Saxo tenor (1993, Xerais) ISBN 978-84-7507-715-4.
- As actas escuras (1994).
- Touporroutou da lúa e do sol (farsada choqueira para actores e bonecos, ou viceversa) (1996, AS-PG) ISBN 84-921126-0-3.
- Doentes (1998, Deputación da Coruña).
- A ópera de a patacón: versión libre para charanga e comediantes pouco ou nada subsidiados (1998, Xerais) ISBN 84-8302-277-X.
- Rastros (1998, Positivas) ISBN 978-84-87783-50-0.
