= Khaleej Aden Troupe =

Yemeni theatre company

The Khaleej Aden Troupe is a theatre troupe based in Aden, Yemen. It was founded in 2005 by Yemeni director Amr Gamal.

== History ==
The troupe was founded on 5 May 2005, with their first performance being a production of Aiyla.com/family.com, a play written by founder Amr Gamal. The play drew an audience of about 350. They were first based out of Cinema Hurricane in Aden, but later also put on productions in Sanaa.

By 2008, the troupe's productions were reliably drawing about 800 people. In 2010, the troupe traveled to Berlin to perform Mak Nazl, a musical that they had premiered in Sanaa in late 2009.

By the late 2010s, due to the Yemeni civil war, the troupe was staging performances in wedding halls, as many theaters had been destroyed. In September 2019, the troupe put on the play Ala Hurkruk, a "satirical musical performance" about the annoyance and suffering caused by the war, in Al Sheikh Othman. Performances were held three times a week to audiences of about 400 people each.

The troupe has resisted societal pressure to stage separate performances for men and women.

== Productions ==
- Aiyla.com (English: Family.com) (2005)
- Mak Nazl (2009)
- Red Card (November 2010)
- Sewage
- Ala Hurkruk (English: On the Edge) (September 2019)
- Aiyla.com (English: Family.com) (2021)
- Hamlet (2023)
