= 10 Days Before the Wedding =

2018 film directed by Amr Gamal

- Directed by: Amr Gamal
- Screenplay by: Amr Gamal; Mazen Refa'at
- Produced by: Mohsen Alkhalifi; Amr Gamal
- Cinematography: Aimen Almekhlafi
- Edited by: Aimen Almekhlafi
- Music by: Salem Fadaq
- Production company: Adenium Production
- Release date: 21 August 2018; Aden
- Running time: 120 minutes
- Country: Yemen
- Language: Arabic

10 Days Before the Wedding is a 2018 Yemeni romantic comedy film directed by Amr Gamal. It was Yemen's official submission for the 91st Academy Award for Best International Feature Film.

The film premiered in Aden City on August 21, 2018, becoming the first film to be commercially released in Yemen in four decades.

10 Days Before The Wedding was a big commercial success in Yemen and received widespread critical acclaim. It was screened at a number of film festivals such as the Jaipur International Film Festival, Pune International Film Festival, Zanzibar International Film Festival, San Diego Arab Film Festival, Casablanca Arab Film Festival, and Aswan International Women's Film Festival.

== Plot ==
A number of obstacles stand in the way of a young Yemeni couple, as only 10 days are left before their wedding. Each obstacle is, in one way or another, caused by the aftermath of the 2015 war in Yemen.

Rasha and Ma'moon, a young Yemeni couple, were set to get married, but the war of 2015 stood in the way of their wedding. After so much suffering, they tried the best they could to make it happen in 2018. Yet again, obstacles appear, but this time it's not the war; it's the aftermath.

Starting from searching for an apartment at a reasonable price, having to deal with war dealers who control the city, clashing with armed militias, and facing the suffocating economic crisis in Yemen, the couple races against time to make sure that the wedding, which is scheduled to take place in 10 days, takes place on time.

== Cast ==
- Sali Hamada as Rasha
- Khaled Hamdan as Ma'amon
- Mh'd Nagi Break as Salim
- Qassem Rashad as Mushtaq
- Bakkar Basaraheel as Waleed
- Abeer AbdulKareem as Samar

== Production ==
In the spring of 2018, Director Amr Gamal began the production of his first feature film, 10 Days Before the Wedding. The film premiered in Aden during the summer of the same year, becoming the first film to be commercially released in Yemen in four decades.

As a result of the destruction of the infrastructure in Aden due to successive wars and the deterioration of cinemas due to negligence, the producers had no choice but to rent two wedding halls to screen the movie inside.

The work team constructed two wooden screens, each measuring 4 meters by 6 meters. These screens were painted white, and the film was projected onto them using two low-cost projectors.

The film was shot on a budget of $33,000. It was sponsored by Yemeni businessmen in return for playing their advertisements on the screen before the beginning of the film.

The film was shot entirely in Aden City, and filming lasted only one month.

== Release ==
The premiere of the film took place in Aden City on August 21, 2018. The film achieved great commercial success, as the screenings lasted for more than eight months. The film also participated in a number of international and Arab festivals and won a number of awards.

All attempts by the production team to screen the film in other Yemeni cities outside Aden failed. In Taiz City, extremists opposed the idea of screening the film in Taiz through mosque pulpits and threatened the production team. Armed extremists also burned posters of the film in the streets of the city.

All attempts to show the film in Hadhramaut and Sana'a also failed.

The film opened commercially in the United Arab Emirates on March 7, 2019.

Later, the film became Yemen's official submission for the Academy Award for Best International Feature Film 2019.

== Reception ==
The film achieved great commercial success in Aden City, as the screenings lasted for more than eight months and 70,000 tickets were sold.

The film received great critical acclaim, as all Yemeni newspapers wrote about it, and many local and international television channels were keen to cover the screenings, which were described at the time as unexpected and surprising.

== Awards and nominations ==
Year	Award	Category	Nominee(s)	Result	Ref.
2019	Jaipur International Film Festival	Best Film	10 Days Before The Wedding	Nominated	
2019	Jaipur International Film Festival	Best Makeup and Hairstyle	10 Days Before The Wedding	Won	
2019	Jaipur International Film Festival	Best Costume Design	10 Days Before The Wedding	Won	
2019	Aswan International Women's Film Festival	Best Film	10 Days Before The Wedding	Nominated	
2019	Aswan International Women's Film Festival	Best Film (Special Jury Prize)	10 Days Before The Wedding	Won	
2019	San Diego Arab Film Festival	Best Film (Audience Award)	10 Days Before The Wedding	Won	
2019	Amman Arab Film Festival	Best Film (Audience Award)	10 Days Before The Wedding	Won	
2019	Casablanca Arab Film Festival	Best Film	10 Days Before The Wedding	Nominated	
2019	Casablanca Arab Film Festival	Best Writing	10 Days Before The Wedding	Won	
2019	Zanzibar International Film Festival	Best Film	10 Days Before The Wedding	Nominated	

== See also ==
- List of submissions to the 91st Academy Awards for Best Foreign Language Film
- List of Yemeni submissions for the Academy Award for Best Foreign Language Film
- The Burdened
