= Nada al-Ahdal =

Human rights activist from Yemen

Nada Al-Ahdal
- Born: 3 March 2003 (age 23); Zabid, Yemen
- Organization: nadafund.org
- Known for: Child marriage claims
- Relatives: Abdel Salam al-Ahdal
- Website: www.nadaalahdal.com

Nada Al-Ahdal (Arabic: ندى الأهدل; born March 3, 2003) is a human rights activist and resident of Yemen known for escaping two different child marriage pacts her parents had made for her. In 2013, al-Ahdal posted a YouTube video decrying child marriage and her being forced into marriage contracts, which quickly went viral and prompted coverage of Yemen's continued practice of child marriage.

In 2022 she won the Arab Woman Award for her activities as a social activist.

Al-Ahdal later founded the Nada Foundation, a Britain-based organization named after her. In recognition of her activism, she won the Arab Woman Award for the year 2021 from the Arab Foundation in London. Additionally, she serves as an ambassador for Do for Good in Spain. Currently, Al-Ahdal is pursuing studies in international law in Britain, where she also resides.

== First marriage pact ==
According to Nada al-Ahdal and her uncle Abdel Salam al-Ahdal, at 10 years 3 months old, she was to be married off to a wealthy expatriate. Her parents accepted money from the suitor, but her uncle told the man that al-Ahdal was not nearly modest enough for him in an effort to scare him away. Abdel stated "When I heard about the groom, I panicked. Nada was not even 11 years old; she was exactly 10 years and 3 months. I could not allow her to be married off and have her future destroyed.” Having the suitor lose interest, al-Ahdal continued to live with her parents but later left and fled to her uncle. At the time of the agreement, the suitor was 26 years old, 16 years older than al-Ahdal. The agreed amount for al-Ahdal was $2000.

== Second marriage pact ==
In 2013, then at age 10, al-Ahdal uploaded a 2.5 minute video to YouTube which quickly went viral. In the video, al-Ahdal accused her parents of trying to get her married in exchange for money. The video was released with al-Ahdal speaking Arabic, but a YouTube user translated the video and uploaded it to YouTube with English captions. Reddit user Syd_G shared al-Ahdal's YouTube video on the site, prompting even more social media sharing. The video received over seven million views in three days.

Al-Ahdal's sister had recently been married off at age 14, with al-Ahdal soon to be engaged at 12 to be married in the "near future". In the video, al-Ahdal started off by saying "It's true that I ran away from my family. I can't live with them anymore. Enough. I want to go live with my uncle. What about the innocence of childhood? What have the children done wrong? Why do you marry them off like that?" She continued, saying that she would rather die than be married off, citing lost educational opportunities, suicide among young brides and early death. She also talked about her aunt who was married off at age 14, who endured abuse by her much older husband before finally dousing herself in gasoline and setting herself on fire.

Al-Ahdal ran away from home to escape the marriage and was quickly taken in by her uncle, a montage and graphics technician at a TV station.

== Controversy ==
Many Middle East media outlets have decried al-Ahdal's claims as fabricated or a deception of Yemeni and Islamic custom. The Yemen Post has accused her of trying to ruin Yemeni and Islamic customs. The Arab magazine The Majalla claims that because of her uncle's media connections, he tried to exploit al-Ahdal by "turn[ing] the young school girl into Yemen’s new Nujood [Ali]" so that they will be able to abolish child marriage in Yemen. Al-Ahdal's parents stated that her claims were fabrications and that the video was scripted by her uncle. However, contrary to what her parents stated, Nada Al-Ahdal said they threatened to honor kill her if she refused the first marriage pact.

== Impact ==
Al-Ahdal's claims have raised the discussion of child marriage in international media. Articles from across the globe are often citing the Human Rights Watch's research, which states that Yemen has no minimum age for marriage, and that about half of all women married in Yemen are married off as children. In an article about al-Ahdal, the International Political Forum stated "Some statistics can help put her story in context: According to the United Nations, one out of nine girls in developing countries will be married by age 15, and an estimated 14.2 million girls a year will probably become child brides in the next decade."

Al-Ahdal and the child marriage pacts have been covered in CNN, The Huffington Post, the BBC and many other media outlets. Reports of the incident by global media brought attention to the issue of child marriage.

== Works ==
On December 3, 2015 The Story of the Girl Who Stood Up for Against Child Marriage was published by the Michel Lafon Company in French, co-written by al-Ahdal and Yemeni director Khadija al-Salami. The first version is in French, titled La rosée du matin. Another version in Polish is titled Jedenastoletnia zona.

Al-Ahdal took part in the movie I Am Nojoom, Age 10 and Divorced.

MBC 1 has produced a detailed investigative press of her story.
