= Amina al-Ruhaif =

Yemeni woman

Amina al-Ruhaif (also known as Amina Ali Abulatif al Tuhaif) is a Yemeni woman who was sentenced to death at age 14 for killing her husband, Hezn Hasam Qabail. al-Ruhalf's death sentence was later revoked due to international outcry, and she was instead imprisoned for 9 years. al-Ruhaif was arrested in 1998 and a government-appointed doctor established that at the time of the crime she was between 14 and 15. She has continually maintained her innocence.

== Early life ==
al-Ruhaif was married as a child to Hezn Hasam Qabail (when she was eleven). She was raised in a rural area in Yemen and she did not attend school.

== Murder ==
=== Other suspects ===
al-Ruhaif claims that her husband's cousin strangled Hezn Hasam Qabail to death. At the time, the two were having a land dispute. This cousin is also on death-row for the same murder.

Critiques of al-Ruhaif's trial also argue that the force required to strangle a full grown man, and then drag his body to the cistern to make it look as if he had drowned, would have taken substantial strength beyond that of a child. al-Ruhaif has also stated she was tortured into confessing.

=== Death sentence ===
al-Ruhaif did not have proper legal representation, and was scheduled for execution in 2002 (when she would be old enough to be hanged under Yemen's laws).

This sparked controversy because of her age. In Yemen, children can only receive the death sentence if they are at least 15 years old at the time of the murder (and the medical doctor was unsure of her exact age). al-Ruhaif did not have any documents proving her age and the government thus went forth with prosecuting her as an adult despite the doctor's findings. Yemen has also signed the UN Child Rights Convention, which states that children cannot receive capital punishment (meaning only 18 year olds can get the death sentence).

==== Rape and pregnancy ====
al Tuhaif was raped by a prison guard while at al-Mahaweet prison and subsequently became pregnant. The pregnancy resulted in Yemen being unable to carry out the death sentence because Yemeni law states a mother cannot be executed until the child is two (when they are no longer breastfeeding).

==== Stay of execution ====
A stay of execution was granted until 2005, due to the pregnancy.

==== Demand for new trial ====
Various celebrities, non-profits and international organizations demanded a new trial for al-Ruhaif. From Lilli Gruber, Emma Bonino, to Amnesty international.

==== Blood money paid ====
After the controversy, Yemen officials used the Sharia Law alternative to the death penalty, which is to pay the victim's family "blood money." The payment is considered an acceptable alternative to execution. Dr Attard Montalto offered to pay the sum, however, the relatives already refused an offer of blood money arguing that accepting money for the woman's release would imply they were accepting that a family member of theirs had committed the murder without al-Ruhaif's involvement.

==== Released for time served ====
Due to the controversy and her age, al-Ruhaif was released after she served the maximum youth sentence of 10 years.

== Film ==
Filmmaker Khadija Al-Salami, created the documentary is Amina (2006), which was screened during the Arab Film Festival in October in the San Francisco Bay Area. Khadija Al-Salami appealed directly to the president of Yemen, Ali Abdullah Saleh, to overturn al-Ruhaif's conviction.
