= List of submissions to the 89th Academy Awards for Best Foreign Language Film =

2016 Best Foreign Language Film submissions
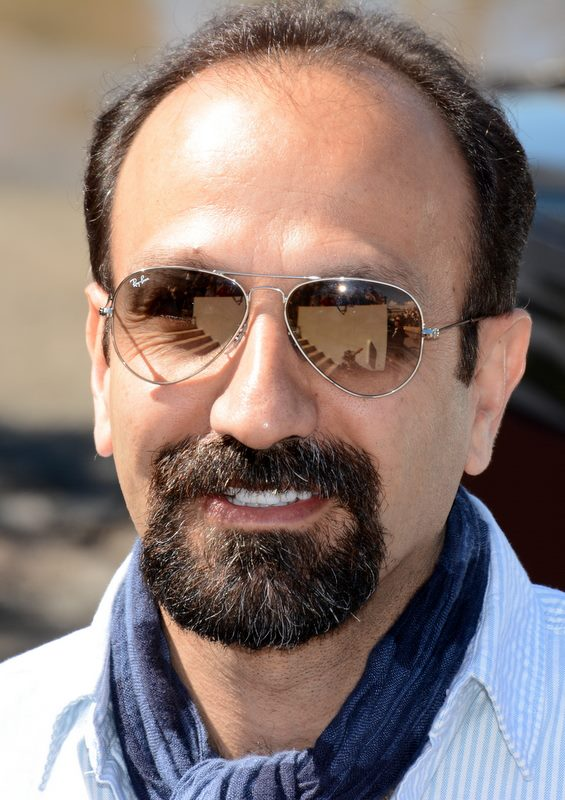
- Asghar Farhadi directed The Salesman, which won the year's award.

Highlights
- Oscar winner: (Iran) The Salesman
- Submissions: 89
- Debuts: 1
- Total eligible: 85

This is a list of submissions to the 89th Academy Awards for the Best Foreign Language Film. The Academy of Motion Picture Arts and Sciences (AMPAS) has invited the film industries of various countries to submit their best film for the Academy Award for Best Foreign Language Film every year since the award was created in 1956. The award is presented annually by the Academy to a feature-length motion picture produced outside the United States that contains primarily non-English dialogue. The Foreign Language Film Award Committee oversees the process and reviews all the submitted films.

For the 89th Academy Awards, the submitted motion pictures must have first been released theatrically in their respective countries between 1 October 2015 and 30 September 2016. The deadline for submissions to the Academy was 3 October 2016. 89 countries submitted films, and 85 were found to be eligible by AMPAS and screened for voters. Yemen submitted a film for the first time. After the 9-film shortlist was announced on 15 December 2016, the five nominees were announced on 24 January 2019.

Iran won the award for the second time with The Salesman by Asghar Farhadi, his second win after A Separation (2011). He did not attend the ceremony to accept the award in protest of then new travel policies banning Iranians traveling to the United States.

== Submissions ==
Submitting country	Film title used in nomination	Original title	Language(s)	Director(s)	Result
Afghanistan	Parting	رفتن	Persian, Dari	Navid Mahmoudi	Not on the final list
Albania	Chromium	Krom	Albanian	Bujar Alimani	Not nominated
Algeria	The Well	Le puits / البئر	Arabic, French	Lotfi Bouchouchi	Not nominated
Argentina	The Distinguished Citizen	El ciudadano ilustre	Spanish	Gastón Duprat and Mariano Cohn	Not nominated
Armenia	Earthquake	Երկրաշարժ / Землетрясение	Armenian, Russian	Sarik Andreasyan	Disqualified
Australia	Tanna		Nivhaal Southwest Tanna, Kwamera	Martin Butler and Bentley Dean	Nominated
Austria	Stefan Zweig: Farewell to Europe	Vor der Morgenröte	German, English, Brazilian Portuguese, French, Spanish, Russian	Maria Schrader	Not nominated
Bangladesh	The Unnamed	অজ্ঞাতনামা	Bengali	Tauquir Ahmed	Not nominated
Belgium	The Ardennes	D'Ardennen	Antwerps Brabantian, French, Dutch	Robin Pront	Not nominated
Bolivia	Sealed Cargo	Carga sellada	Spanish	Julia Vargas-Weise	Not nominated
Bosnia and Herzegovina	Death in Sarajevo	Smrt u Sarajevu	Bosnian, French, English	Danis Tanović	Not nominated
Brazil	Little Secret	Pequeno Segredo	Brazilian Portuguese, English	David Schurmann	Not nominated
Bulgaria	Losers	Каръци	Bulgarian	Ivaylo Hristov	Not nominated
Cambodia	Before the Fall	មុនពេលបែកបាក់	Khmer, English, French	Ian White	Not nominated
Cameroon	Yahan Ameena Bikti Hai	यहां अमीना बिकती है	Hindi	Kumar Raj	Not on the final list
Canada	It's Only the End of the World	Juste la fin du monde	French	Xavier Dolan	Made shortlist
Chile	Neruda		Spanish, French, Dutch, Mapudungun	Pablo Larraín	Not nominated
China	Xuanzang	大唐玄奘	Mandarin, Sanskrit	Huo Jianqi	Not nominated
Colombia	Alias Maria	Alias María	Spanish	José Luis Rugeles	Not nominated
Costa Rica	About Us	Entonces nosotros	Spanish	Hernán Jiménez	Not nominated
Croatia	On the Other Side	S one strane	Croatian	Zrinko Ogresta	Not nominated
Cuba	The Companion	El acompañante	Spanish	Pavel Giroud	Not nominated
Czech Republic	Lost in Munich	Ztraceni v Mnichově	Czech, French, English	Petr Zelenka	Not nominated
Denmark	Land of Mine	Under sandet	Danish, German, English	Martin Zandvliet	Nominated
Dominican Republic	Sugar Fields	Flor de azúcar	Spanish	Fernando Báez Mella	Not nominated
Ecuador	Such Is Life in the Tropics	Sin muertos no hay carnaval	Spanish, English, German	Sebastián Cordero	Not nominated
Egypt	Clash	اشتباك	Arabic	Mohamed Diab	Not nominated
Estonia	Mother	Ema	Estonian	Kadri Kõusaar	Not nominated
Finland	The Happiest Day in the Life of Olli Mäki	Hymyilevä mies	Finnish, English	Juho Kuosmanen	Not nominated
France	Elle		French	Paul Verhoeven	Not nominated
Georgia	House of Others	სხვისი სახლი	Georgian, Russian	Rusudan Glurjidze	Not nominated
Germany	Toni Erdmann		German, English, Romanian, French	Maren Ade	Nominated
Greece	Chevalier		Greek, English	Athina Rachel Tsangari	Not nominated
Hong Kong	Port of Call	踏血尋梅	Cantonese, Mandarin	Philip Yung	Not nominated
Hungary	Kills on Wheels	Tiszta szívvel	Hungarian, Serbian	Attila Till	Not nominated
Iceland	Sparrows	Þrestir	Icelandic	Rúnar Rúnarsson	Not nominated
India	Interrogation	விசாரணை	Tamil, Telugu	Vetrimaaran	Not nominated
Indonesia	Letters from Prague	Surat dari Praha	Indonesian, Czech, English	Angga Dwimas Sasongko	Not nominated
Iran	The Salesman	فروشنده	Persian	Asghar Farhadi	Won Academy Award
Iraq	El Clásico	ئێل کلاسیکۆ	Central Kurdish, Arabic, Spanish	Halkawt Mustafa	Not nominated
Israel	Sand Storm	عاصفة رملية / סופת חול	Arabic	Elite Zexer	Not nominated
Italy	Fire at Sea	Fuocoammare	Italian, Sicilian, French, English	Gianfranco Rosi	Not nominated
Japan	Nagasaki: Memories of My Son	母と暮せば	Japanese	Yoji Yamada	Not nominated
Jordan	3000 Nights	٣٠٠٠ ليلة	Arabic, Hebrew	Mai Masri	Not nominated
Kazakhstan	Amanat	Аманат	Kazakh, Russian	Satybaldy Narymbetov	Not nominated
Kosovo	Home Sweet Home		Albanian	Faton Bajraktari	Not nominated
Kyrgyzstan	A Father's Will	Атанын керээзи	Kyrgyz, English	Bakyt Mukul and Dastan Japar Uulu	Not nominated
Latvia	Dawn	Ausma	Latvian	Laila Pakalniņa	Not nominated
Lebanon	Very Big Shot	فيلم كتير كبير	Arabic, French, English	Mir-Jean Bou Chaaya	Not nominated
Lithuania	Seneca's Day	Senekos diena	Lithuanian, Russian, Estonian	Kristijonas Vildžiūnas	Not nominated
Luxembourg	Voices from Chernobyl	La supplication	French	Pol Cruchten	Not nominated
(North Macedonia) Macedonia	The Liberation of Skopje	Ослободување на Скопје	Macedonian, German, Bulgarian	Rade and Danilo Šerbedžija	Not nominated
Malaysia	Beautiful Pain	Redha	Malay	Tunku Mona Riza	Not nominated
Mexico	Desierto		Spanish, English	Jonás Cuarón	Not nominated
Montenegro	The Black Pin	Igla ispod praga	Montenegrin	Ivan Marinovic	Not nominated
Morocco	A Mile in My Shoes	مسافة ميل بحذائي	Arabic	Said Khallaf	Not nominated
Nepal	The Black Hen	कालो पोथी	Khasa Prakrit	Min Bahadur Bham	Not nominated
Netherlands	Tonio		Dutch	Paula van der Oest	Not nominated
New Zealand	A Flickering Truth		Dari	Pietra Brettkelly	Not nominated
Norway	The King's Choice	Kongens nei	Norwegian, Danish, German, Swedish	Erik Poppe	Made shortlist
Pakistan	Mah-e-Mir	ماہ میر	Urdu	Anjum Shahzad	Not nominated
Palestine	The Idol	يا طير الطاير	Arabic	Hany Abu Assad	Not nominated
Panama	Salsipuedes		Spanish	Ricardo Aguilar Navarro and Manuel Rodríguez	Not nominated
Peru	Videophilia (and Other Viral Syndromes)	Videofilia (y otros síndromes virales)	Spanish, English	Juan Daniel F. Molero	Not nominated
Philippines	Ma' Rosa		Filipino	Brillante Mendoza	Not nominated
Poland	Afterimage	Powidoki	Polish	Andrzej Wajda	Not nominated
Portugal	Letters from War	Cartas da Guerra	Portuguese	Ivo M. Ferreira	Not nominated
Romania	Sieranevada		Romanian	Cristi Puiu	Not nominated
Russia	Paradise	Рай	Russian, German, French, Yiddish	Andrei Konchalovsky	Made shortlist
Saudi Arabia	Barakah Meets Barakah	بركة يقابل بركة	Arabic	Mahmoud Sabbagh	Not nominated
Serbia	Train Driver's Diary	Дневник машиновође	Serbian	Miloš Radović	Not nominated
Singapore	Apprentice		Malay, English	Boo Junfeng	Not nominated
Slovakia	Eva Nová		Slovak	Marko Škop	Not nominated
Slovenia	Houston, We Have a Problem!	Houston, imamo problem!	Slovene, Serbian, Croatian, Bosnian, English	Žiga Virc	Not nominated
South Africa	Call Me Thief	Noem My Skollie	Kaaps	Daryne Joshua	Not nominated
South Korea	The Age of Shadows	밀정	Korean, Japanese, Mandarin, English	Kim Jee-woon	Not nominated
Spain	Julieta		Spanish	Pedro Almodóvar	Not nominated
Sweden	A Man Called Ove	En man som heter Ove	Swedish, Persian	Hannes Holm	Nominated
Switzerland	My Life as a Zucchini	Ma vie de Courgette	French	Claude Barras	Made shortlist
Taiwan	Hang in There, Kids!	Lokah Laqi / 只要我長大	Atayal, Mandarin	Laha Mebow	Not nominated
Thailand	Karma	อาปัติ	Thai	Kanittha Kwanyu	Not nominated
Tunisia	As I Open My Eyes	À peine j'ouvre les yeux / على حلة عيني	Arabic, French	Leyla Bouzid	Not on the final list
Turkey	Cold of Kalandar	Kalandar Soğuğu	Turkish	Mustafa Kara	Not nominated
Ukraine	Ukrainian Sheriffs	Українські шерифи	Ukrainian, Russian	Roman Bondarchuk	Not nominated
United Kingdom	Under the Shadow	زیر سایه	Persian	Babak Anvari	Not nominated
Uruguay	Breadcrumbs	Migas de pan	Spanish	Manane Rodríguez	Not nominated
Venezuela	From Afar	Desde allá	Spanish	Lorenzo Vigas	Not nominated
Vietnam	Yellow Flowers on the Green Grass	Tôi thấy hoa vàng trên cỏ xanh	Vietnamese	Victor Vũ	Not nominated
Yemen	I Am Nojoom, Age 10 and Divorced	أنا نجوم بنت العاشره ومطلقة	Arabic	Khadija al-Salami	Not nominated

== Notes ==
- Afghanistan submitted Parting by Navid Mahmoudi, but it was not included on the list of eligible contenders announced by the Academy.
- Armenia submitted Earthquake by Sarik Andreasyan, but it was disqualified for not meeting the submission requirements.
- Austria submitted Stefan Zweig: Farewell to Europe by Maria Schrader, but it was reportedly rejected by the Academy for not being an Austrian film. The film was ultimately included on the list of eligible contenders announced by the Academy.
- Brazil had three films withdrawn from consideration; Don't Call Me Son by Anna Muylaert, Neon Bull by Gabriel Mascaro, and To My Beloved by Aly Muritiba. This was in protest of the appointment of Marcos Petrucelli as a member of the committee, due to his pre-established criticism of Aquarius by Kleber Mendonça Filho after the cast and crew of the film protested in Cannes against the Impeachment of Dilma Rousseff. Although Aquarius was seen as the front-runner, it was not chosen by the committee, generating disapproval and more controversy over the relations between the film and Brazil's new government.
- Cameroon submitted Yahan Ameena Bikti Hai by Kumar Raj, but it was not included on the list of eligible contenders announced by the Academy.
- Tunisia's submission was originally reported to be The Flower of Aleppo by Ridha Behi. However, this was later changed to As I Open My Eyes by Leyla Bouzid. Neither film was included on the list of eligible contenders announced by the Academy.
