= About Us (film) =

2016 film

- Film poster
- Directed by: Hernán Jiménez
- Written by: Hernán Jiménez
- Produced by: Chris Cole; Laura Avila Tacsan
- Starring: Hernán Jiménez; Noelia Castaño; Marina Glezer
- Cinematography: Ben Hardwicke
- Edited by: Hernán Jiménez
- Music by: Mark Orton
- Production companies: Evoke; LaLaLa Productions
- Release dates: 9 April 2016 (Panama); 5 May 2016 (Costa Rica)
- Running time: 97 minutes
- Country: Costa Rica
- Language: Spanish

About Us (Spanish: Entonces Nosotros) is a 2016 Costa Rican romantic comedy-drama film written and directed by Hernán Jiménez, who also stars with Noelia Castaño and Marina Glezer. It was selected as the Costa Rican entry for the Best Foreign Language Film at the 89th Academy Awards but it was not nominated.

== Cast ==
- Hernán Jiménez as Diego
- Noelia Castaño as Sofia
- Marina Glezer as Malena

== See also ==
- List of submissions to the 89th Academy Awards for Best Foreign Language Film
- List of Costa Rican submissions for the Academy Award for Best Foreign Language Film
