= Hernán Jiménez =

Costa Rican director (born 1980)

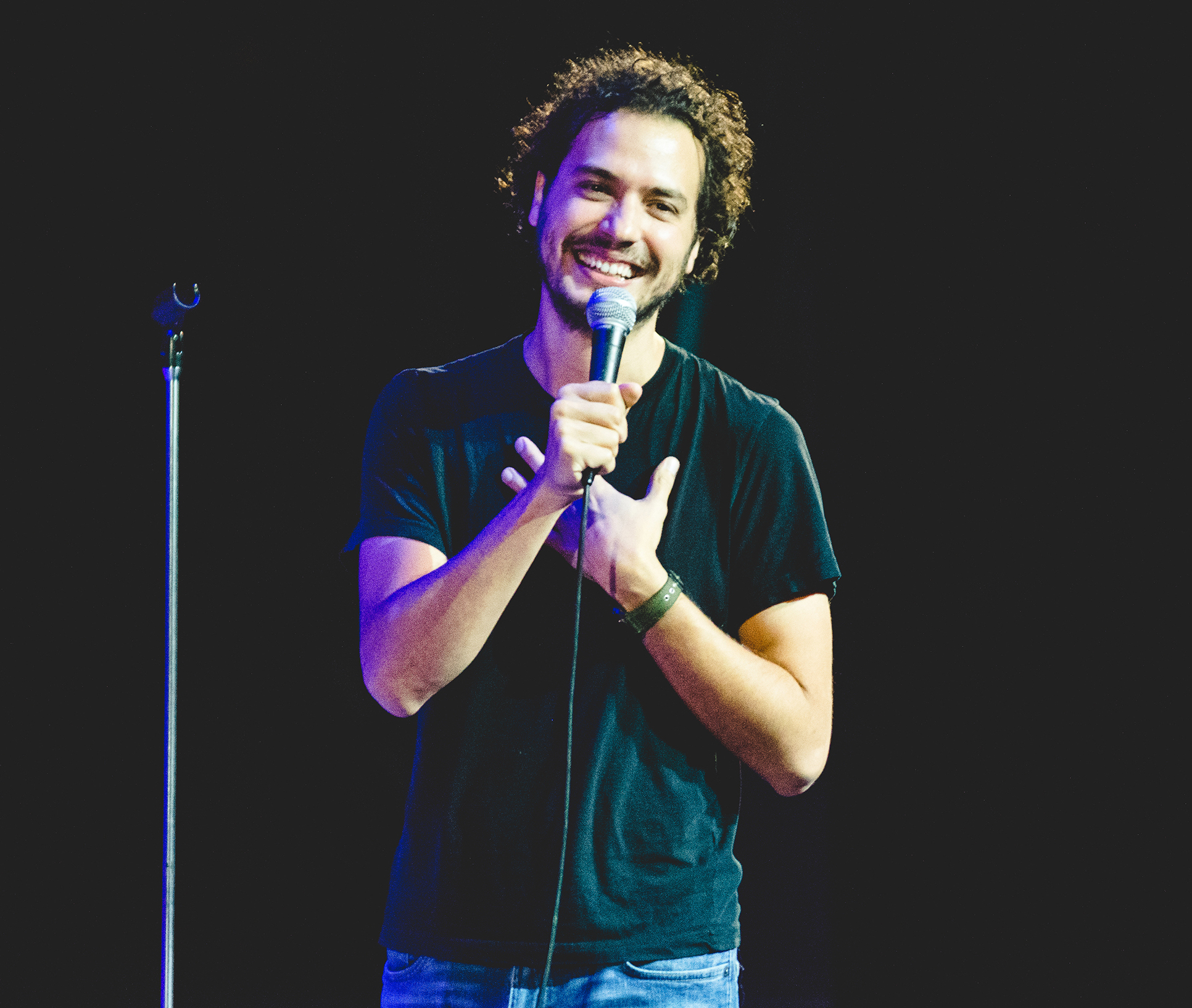
- Born: April 22, 1980 (age 46); San José, Costa Rica
- Education: San Francisco Art Institute (BFA); Columbia University (MFA)
- Occupations: Film director, screenwriter, actor, comedian
- Years active: 2005–present
- Website: hernanjimenez.com

Hernán Jiménez (born 1980) is a Costa Rican film director, screenwriter, actor and stand-up comedian.

== Early life and education ==
Jiménez was born in San José, Costa Rica. and left the country when he was 16 to attend Pearson College UWC in British Columbia, Canada. Jiménez earned a BFA in film from San Francisco Art Institute and an MFA in screenwriting and directing at Columbia University. He trained as an actor at the National Theatre School of Canada in Montreal.

== Career ==
=== Stand-up comedy ===
Jiménez started out as a stand-up comedian in Costa Rica. He consistently performs sold-out shows at venues across Costa Rica, and has written and starred in five stand-up comedy television specials since 2012, including, "Se despichó Tere", which shattered attendance records locally and sold over 80,000 tickets. In 2024 he launched his new stand up special "Gato x Liebre", which once again topped attendance records and was later recorded at the iconic Teatro Melico Salazar in San José.

=== Filmmaking ===
Jiménez's debut feature, A ojos cerrados, premiered in Costa Rica in 2010. The film is about a successful young executive who must choose between honoring her grandmother and an important work project.

With money made from his first film and his stand-up comedy act, Jimenez funded his second feature, El regreso (The Return). Jiménez wrote and directed the film and starred as Antonio, who after a decade living in New York City returns to Costa Rica for a visit and is confronted with his past. It won Best International Feature Film at the 2011 HBO New York International Latino Film Festival, and premiered theatrically in Costa Rica in September 2011.

His follow-up, the romantic comedy Entonces nosotros (About Us), stars Jiménez as Diego, who is trying to salvage his relationship with his longtime girlfriend Sofia (Noelia Castaño). It premiered at IFF Panama in April 2016 and in theaters in Costa Rica in May 2016. It had the second-best opening weekend for a local film in the history of Costa Rican cinema. In October 2016, the film was selected to be the Costa Rican entry for Best Foreign Language Film at the 89th Academy Awards.

In 2017, Jiménez wrote and directed his feature film and English language debut Elsewhere, starring Parker Posey, Aden Young, Ken Jeong, Beau Bridges, Jacki Weaver and Jackie Tohn. The film was shot near Vancouver, British Columbia and premiered on January 24, 2020.

He co-wrote the biopic A Million Miles Away for Amazon Studios, based on the life of NASA astronaut José Hernández, starring Michael Peña. The project was directed by Alejandra Márquez Abella and produced by Mark Ciardi.

Jiménez directed the Netflix romantic comedy Love Hard, starring Nina Dobrev, Jimmy O. Yang and Darren Barnett. The film premiered on November 5, 2021, and became the # 1 movie on Netflix worldwide. The film was produced by Mary Viola and McG under their banner Wonderland Sound and Vision.

In 2025 Jiménez wrote and directed the Costa Rican film ABRIL, starring Maricarmen Merino, François Arnaud and Lara Yuja. Later in the year Jiménez will direct the film Getting Rid of Matthew, based on the novel by Jane Fallon, starring Lucy Hale, Heather Graham and Luke Wilson. The film is produced by Alloy Entertainment.

== Filmography ==
=== Feature films ===
Year	Title	Credited as	Role	Notes
2010	A ojos cerrados (Eyes Closed)	Writer, director, producer, editor		
2012	El regreso (The Return)	Writer, director, executive producer, editor	Antonio	Won Best International Feature Film, nominated for Best Director at 2011 New York International Latino Film Festival; Won Best Film, Best Actor, Best Actress at the Icaro Film Festival
2015	Viaje		Taxista	Premiered at 2015 Tribeca Film Festival
2016	Entonces nosotros (About Us)	Writer, director, editor	Diego	Costa Rican entry for Best Foreign Language Film at 89th Academy Awards
2018	Elsewhere	Writer, director, editor		
2021	Love Hard	Director		The film was released on Netflix on November 5 and was number one in 87 countries by November 7, 2021.
2026	Abril	Writer, director, producer, editor, cinematographer	Julián	Won Best International Feature Film at 2026 New York International Latino Film Festival

=== Short films ===
Year	Title	Credited as	Notes
2005	Avería de la conciencia	Writer, director	
2005	Doble llave y cadena	Writer, director, producer, cinematographer, editor	Documentary short
2008	Una tarde cualquiera	Writer, director, producer, cinematographer, editor	
2010	The Red Bridge	Writer, director, producer, cinematographer, editor	
2013	Tamarindo	Writer, director, editor	

=== Stand-up specials ===
Year	Title	Credited as	Role	Notes
2012	¡Esto es en serio!	Writer, director	Himself	Comedy special
2013	Vamos por partes	Writer, director	Himself	Comedy special
2015	¡Así quién no!	Writer, director	Himself	Comedy special
2017	¿Quién dijo miedo?	Writer, director	Himself	Comedy special
2019	Se despichó Tere	Writer, director	Himself	Comedy special
2024	Gato por liebre	Writer, director	Himself	Comedy special
