= Love Hard =

2021 film by Hernán Jiménez

- Official release poster
- Directed by: Hernán Jiménez
- Written by: Danny Mackey; Rebecca Ewing
- Produced by: McG; Mary Viola
- Starring: Nina Dobrev; Jimmy O. Yang; Darren Barnet
- Cinematography: Shane Hurlbut
- Edited by: Priscilla Nedd-Friendly
- Music by: Mark Orton
- Production company: Wonderland Sound and Vision
- Distributed by: Netflix
- Release date: November 5, 2021
- Running time: 105 minutes
- Country: United States
- Language: English

Love Hard is a 2021 American romantic comedy film directed by Hernán Jiménez and written by Danny Mackey and Rebecca Ewing. Starring Nina Dobrev, Jimmy O. Yang, and Darren Barnet, the film follows a young woman who travels to her online crush's hometown for Christmas but discovers she has been catfished. It was produced by Wonderland Sound and Vision and filmed in Vancouver from October to November 2020. It released by Netflix on November 5, 2021.

The title is a portmanteau of Love Actually and Die Hard, the respective favorite Christmas films of main characters Josh and Natalie.

== Plot ==
Natalie Bauer is a Los Angeles-based dating column writer who documents her disastrous dates she meets via a dating app. After deciding to expand the app's search radius, Natalie matches with a man named Josh Lin and forms a strong connection to him through many long phone calls. She decides to travel to his hometown in Lake Placid, New York, to surprise him for Christmas, promising her boss this will be the end to her dating disasters. However, she soon discovers that she has been catfished by Josh, who used another man's pictures. Natalie is angry, but learns that the man whose pictures Josh used, Tag Abbott, is Josh's childhood friend who lives in the same town. Josh offers to set them up if she pretends to be his girlfriend for the holidays, and Natalie agrees to stay with the Lin family.

Josh sets Tag up to meet Natalie and introduces her as his cousin. Natalie lies about her interest in Henry David Thoreau and rock climbing to impress Tag. Tag invites her to climb at a climbing gym, where she hides her fear of heights from Tag and Josh helps her down. Tag invites Natalie on more dates.

Natalie meets Josh's brother Owen, the more successful sibling who constantly demands the Lin family's attention. When Natalie and Josh receive praise for their duet of "Baby, It's Cold Outside" during Christmas caroling, Owen becomes jealous and announces his and his wife's pregnancy. To steal the spotlight back, Josh proposes to Natalie on the spot, to which she feels pressured to say yes. Josh reassures Natalie that he will tell his family they did not work out after the holidays. Natalie learns of Josh's candle-making hobby, which he started to remember the scent of his grandfather after he died. She encourages him to make a business out of it.

Josh and Natalie's engagement announcement is printed in the local newspaper, prompting the two to spend the early morning picking up all the papers across town so Tag does not see the news. Natalie goes through Josh's real dating app profile and tells him to have more self-confidence and use pictures that better highlight his strengths. When vegetarian Natalie prepares to eat at a steakhouse on a date with Tag, Josh bitterly tells Natalie she should not lie or compromise her beliefs for Tag. They fight when Natalie reminds him of his lie. While Natalie and Tag leave dinner, Tag admits that he stopped celebrating Christmas a long time ago. Natalie realizes that Tag is not the man that she thought he was, and Tag kisses her.

The next morning, the two offer a Q&A session about online dating to residents of a nursing home at the behest of Josh's grandmother. The session quickly spirals into chaos when many of the resident attendees become interested in presenting false or misleading information about their disabilities and insecurities in order to attract potential partners. Josh offers a monologue about truth and honesty, reminding the residents to be true to themselves. During this monologue, he appears to recognize his own feelings for Natalie, and Natalie, taken aback by the honest moment, seems to recognize developing feelings as well. The residents disregard this and stop paying attention to Josh and Natalie, going on with their own lives. Josh appears distraught but has also recognized his feelings, and a need to be honest and forthcoming with Natalie and others, even despite his own insecurities.

The Lin family throws Josh and Natalie a surprise engagement party at the steakhouse that Tag's family owns. Tag introduces Natalie to his parents as his girlfriend. Natalie's boss arrives and tells Owen about Natalie's dating column. Owen tells Josh that Natalie is just with him for her next story. Natalie gives a speech telling the truth to everyone at the party, including Tag, and then leaves the Lin household. Encouraged by Natalie, Josh tells his father that he no longer wants to run the family store and wishes to start a candle business.

Waiting at the lodge overnight before her morning flight, Natalie sees Josh's new profile on the dating app, which highlights the real him. She realizes she is in love with Josh and returns to his house, where they share a kiss.

== Cast ==
- Nina Dobrev as Natalie Bauer
- Jimmy O. Yang as Josh Lin
- Darren Barnet as Tag
- Harry Shum Jr. as Owen Lin
- Althea Kaye as Grandma June Lin
- James Saito as Bob Lin
- Rebecca Staab as Barb Lin
- Matty Finochio as Lee
- Heather McMahan as Kerry
- Mikaela Hoover as Chelsea Lin
- Sean Depner as Chip

== Production ==
In August 2019, Netflix announced that it had acquired Danny Mackey's and Rebecca Ewing's romantic comedy spec script Love Hard, which was described as "When Harry Met Sally meets Roxanne". McG and Mary Viola were set to produce the film through their company Wonderland Sound and Vision.

In August 2020, it was announced that Hernán Jiménez would direct the film, and that Nina Dobrev, Jimmy O. Yang and Charles Melton would star. In October 2020, it was announced that due to Melton's schedule conflicts with the TV series Riverdale, he had been replaced by Darren Barnet. Harry Shum Jr., James Saito, Mikaela Hoover and Heather McMahan were also added to the cast.

Filming took place in Vancouver, British Columbia, Canada, from October 9 to November 21, 2020. The Lin home is located in New Westminster, British Columbia, and Boundary Bay Airport stood in for Lake Placid Airport.

== Reception ==
The film was released on November 5 and was number one in audience popularity on Netflix in 87 countries by November 7, 2021.

On review aggregator Rotten Tomatoes, the film holds an approval rating of 50% based on 32 reviews, with an average rating of 5.9/10. The website's critics consensus reads, "Love Hard's interesting setup and charming cast have a definite rom-com appeal, even if the story never quite develops its main characters' love connection." On Metacritic, the film has a weighted average score of 42 out of 100, based on eight critics, indicating "mixed or average" reviews.

== See also ==
- List of Christmas films
