= James Saito =

Japanese-American actor

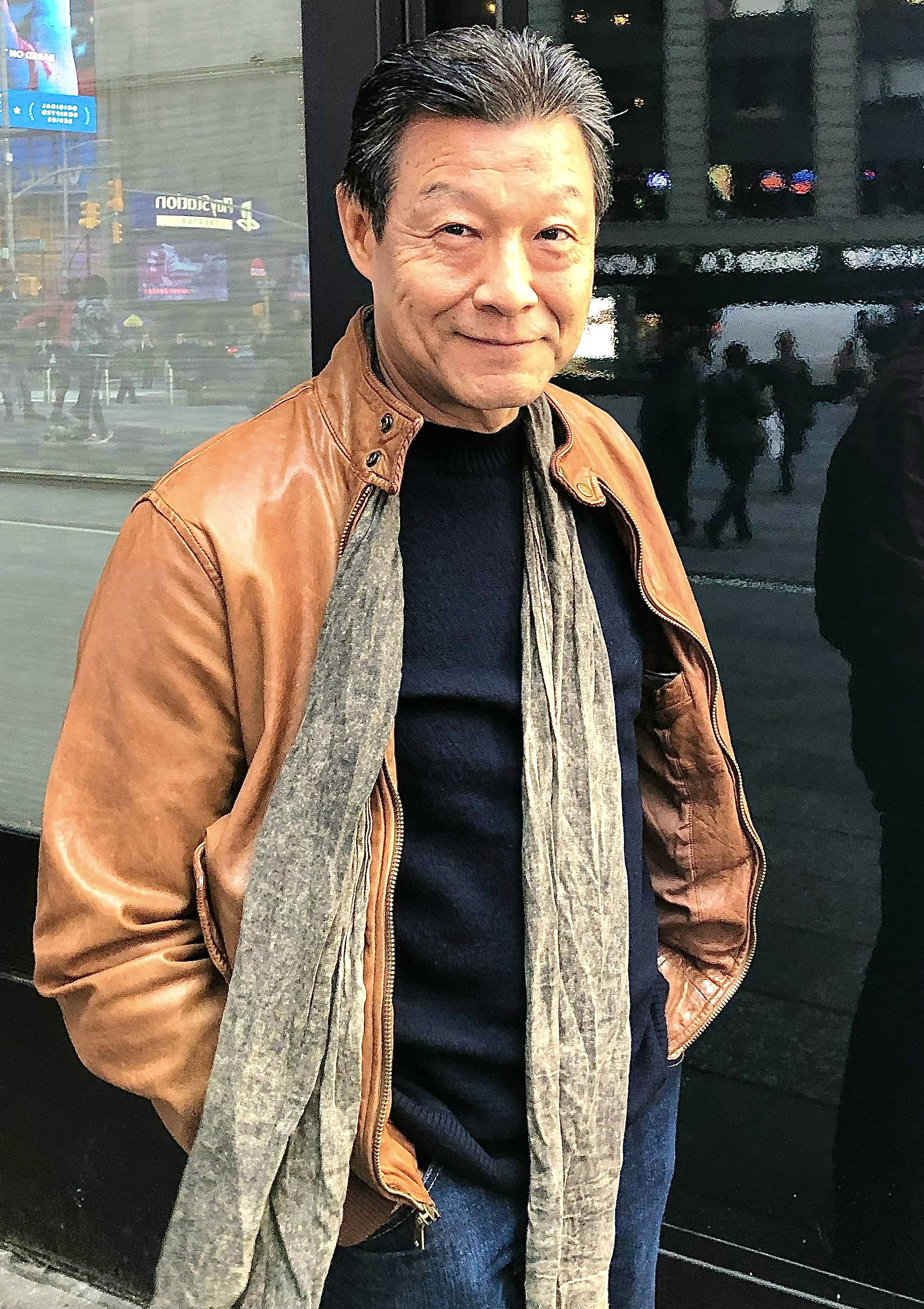
- Education: University of California, Los Angeles
- Occupation: Actor
- Years active: 1976–present

James Saito is an American actor who is best known as the original Shredder in Teenage Mutant Ninja Turtles, Dr. Chen in the ABC series Eli Stone, and Joseph in The Company You Keep. His credits also feature Netflix’s Always Be My Maybe, Love Hard, Dash & Lily, and Altered Carbon, as well as Amazon’s Modern Love. His film work includes Life of Pi, Big Eyes, and The Thomas Crown Affair, alongside numerous other film and TV appearances. He is a member of Academy of Television Arts & Sciences and Academy of Motion Picture Arts and Sciences.

== Early life ==
Saito's parents are of Japanese descent. He graduated from Hamilton High in LA and the University of California, Los Angeles with a degree in acting. He later studied acting with actress Uta Hagen at HB Studio, located in New York City. He was in the last group of students who studied with Sanford Meisner on the island of Bequia in the Grenadines and then continued with Meisner in North Hollywood.

== Career ==
Saito launched his acting career in 1976 with the landmark television film Farewell to Manzanar.Throughout the 1980s and 1990s, he became a familiar face on television, guest-starring in classic series such as , M*A*S*H, Hart to Hart ,The Incredible Hulk (1978 TV series), The Greatest American Hero, MacGyver, and Miami Vice.

In 1990, Saito portrayed the iconic villain Shredder (Oroku Saki) in the original live-action film Teenage Mutant Ninja Turtles. His film career expanded with roles films including Hot Dog... The Movie (1984), To Be the Best (1993) alongside Anthony Hopkins, Henry Fool (1997), The Devil's Advocate (1997), Home Alone 3 (1997), The Thomas Crown Affair (1999), and Pearl Harbor (2001). He later appeared in I Think I Love My Wife (2007), director Ang Lee's Academy Award-winning Life of Pi (2012), director Tim Burton's Big Eyes (2014), While We're Young (2015), and Wilson (2017).

On television, Saito appeared in procedural dramas and hit series including Law & Order, Sex and the City, Law & Order: Criminal Intent, 30 Rock, Blue Bloods, Hawaii Five-0, Person of Interest, Madam Secretary, House of Cards, The Deuce, Elementary, Iron Fist, Broad City, Grey's Anatomy, The Terror and Prodigal Son. He played Dr. Chen as a main cast member in the ABC series Eli Stone (2008–2009) and portrayed Tokugawa Ieyasu in the BBC docudrama series Heroes and Villains (2008).

As a stage actor, Saito received an Obie Award in 2007 for his performance in Julia Cho's play Durango at The Public Theater in New York City.

In recent years, Saito has starred in several streaming and network projects. He played Harry Kim in the popular Netflix romantic comedy Always Be My Maybe (2019), Kenji in the Amazon anthology series Modern Love (2019), and Latching in the Netflix miniseries Dash & Lily (2020), as well as appearing in Altered Carbon. In November 2021, he featured as Bob Lin in the Netflix film Love Hard, and later joined the cast of the ABC drama series The Company You Keep (2023) as Joseph Nishimura.

== Filmography ==
=== Film ===
Year	Title	Role	Notes
1980	The Idolmaker	Eddie	
1984	Hot Dog…The Movie	Kendo	
1984	The Adventures of Buckaroo Banzai Across the 8th Dimension	Masado Banzai, Buckaroo's Father	Scenes deleted
1987	Beyond the Next Mountain	Sniper	
1989	Mortal Sins	Park Sung	
1990	Teenage Mutant Ninja Turtles	The Shredder	Voiced by David McCharen
1993	Silent Cries	Japanese Soldier	
1995	The Hunted	Nemura	
1995	Die Hard with a Vengeance	Korean Proprietor	
1997	Henry Fool	Mr. Deng	
1997	The Devil's Advocate	Takaori Osumi	
1997	Home Alone 3	Korean Mob Boss	
1999	The Thomas Crown Affair	Paul Cheng	
2000	Useless	Executive Oki	Short film
2000	Aloha	James	Short film
2001	Pearl Harbor	Japanese Aide #1	
2001	Love the Hard Way	Akiri	
2001	Another Bed	Bruce	Short film
2003	Robot Stories	Roy / Groper	
2006	Brother's Shadow	Line Boss	
2007	I Think I Love My Wife	Mr. Yuni	
2007	Ghosts of the Heartland	John Lu	
2012	Life of Pi	Older Insurance Investigator	
2013	From the Rough	Won-Sik	
2014	While We're Young	Dr. Nagato	
2014	Big Eyes	Judge	
2017	Wilson	Warren Kudo	
2017	The Only Living Boy in New York	James	
2019	Long Shot	Minister Kishido	
2019	Always Be My Maybe	Harry	
2020	Tigertail	Hank	
2021	Love Hard	Bob Lin	
2026	California Scenario	Bill	

=== Television ===
Year	Title	Role	Notes
1976	Farewell to Manzanar	Richard Wakatsuki	TV movie
1976	Baa Baa Black Sheep	Third commando	Episode: "Up for Grabs"
1977	Baa Baa Black Sheep	Ensign Kira	Episode: "Divine Wind"
1977–1981	M*A*S*H	South Korean Soldier / Park	3 episodes
1978	The Paper Chase	Kai	Episode: "Bell's in Love"
1979	The Paper Chase	Student #1	Episode: "The Apprentice"
1979	Lou Grant	Steve Nakajima	Episode: "Hype"
1980	Enola Gay: The Men, the Mission, the Atomic Bomb	Lieutenant Tatsuo Yamato	TV movie
1980	The Golden Moment: An Olympic Love Story		TV movie
1981	The Waltons	Japanese Sergeant	Episode: "The Last Ten Days"
1981	Soap	Hiro	1 episode
1981	The Misadventures of Sheriff Lobo	Steven Chiu	Episode: "The Roller Disco Karate Kaper"
1981	The Two Lives of Carol Letner	Professor	TV movie
1981	The Incredible Hulk	Viet Interpreter	Episode: "Viet"
1981	The Fall Guy	Police Officer	Episode: "Japanese Connection"
1981	Bosom Buddies	The Man	Episode: "All You Need Is Love"
1982	The Greatest American Hero	Kelly Kim	Episode: "The Hand-Painted Thai"
1982	Tales of the Gold Monkey	Japanese Lieutenant	Episode: "Once a Tiger..."
1983	The Renegades	Sam Chow	Episode: "On the Pad"
1983	Girls of the White Orchid	Officer #1	TV movie; alternative title Death Ride to Osaka
1983–1984	Knots Landing	Reporter	2 episodes
1984	Hart to Hart	Yamahiro	Episode: "The Dog Who Knew Too Much"
1984	Scarecrow and Mrs. King	Ronnie Quan	Episode: "The Mole"
1984	T.J. Hooker	Lab Technician	Episode: "Hot Property"
1984	Charles in Charge	Chinese Food Delivery Man	Episode: "Pilot"
1985	Street Hawk	Joe Ching	Episode: "Chinatown Memories"
1985	Covenant	Cabbie	TV movie
1985	MacGyver	Ming	Episode 1.2: "The Golden Triangle"
1985	Alfred Hitchcock Presents	Anesthesiologist #1	Episode: "Night Fever"
1985	Crazy Like a Fox	Chinese Henchman	Episode: "Year of the Fox"
1985	Miami Vice	Howie Wong	Episode: "Golden Triangle: Part 2"
1986	Blood & Orchids	Halehone	TV movie
1986	The Young and the Restless	Roy Namaguchi	2 episodes
1986	The A-Team	Kwai Li	Episode: "The Say U.N.C.L.E. Affair"
1987	Hill Street Blues	Bob Ashahina	Episode: "Days of Swine and Roses"
1987	Airwolf	Tim Shimizu	Episode: "X-Virus"
1988	Miami Vice	Ma Sek	Episode: "Heart of Night"
1988	C.A.T. Squad: Python Wolf		TV movie
1988	War and Remembrance	Operations Officer (Yamato)	TV Miniseries; Episode: "Part 3"
1989	Gideon Oliver	Johnny Chen	Episode: "Tongs"
1990	Counterstrike	General Loctuck	Episode: "Power Play"
1990	Top Cops	Johnny Kai	Episode: "Paul LeBoeuf/Johnny Kai"
1990	True Blue		Episode: "Chinatown"
1992	To Be the Best	Tony Chiu	TV movie
1994	Law & Order	Mr. Tanaka	Episode: "Scoundrels"
1994–1995	New York Undercover	Detective Chang	2 episodes
1995	Star Trek: Voyager	Nogami	Episode: "The 37s"
1996	Gargoyles	Taro (voice)	Episode: "Bushido"
1996	The Tomorrow Man	Dr. Lorechi	TV movie
1999	Sex and the City	Korean Man	Episode: "Ex and the City"
2000	Strangers with Candy	Drug Tester	Episode: "Blank Relay"
2000	Law & Order	Yoshi Yoshimura	Episode: "Dissonance"
2001	100 Centre Street		2 episodes
2001	The Atlantis Conspiracy	Police Officer	TV movie
2002	Third Watch	Sgt. Yee	Episode: "The Long Guns"
2004	Law & Order: Criminal Intent	Mr. Miyazaki	Episode: "Great Barrier"
2005	Starved	Captain Wong	Episode: "Thank You, I Love You"
2006	As the World Turns	Kano Yamamoto	2 episodes
2008	Heroes and Villains	Ieyasu Tokugawa	Episode: "Shogun"
2008–2009	Eli Stone	Dr. Frank Chen	Main cast
2009	The Unit	Chu	Episode: "Chaos Theory"
2010	Rubicon	Mooney	Episode: "The Truth Will Out"
2010	Blue Bloods	Dennis Eng	Episode: "Chinatown"
2011	Too Big to Fail	Chinese Official	TV movie
2011	One Life to Live	Judge Lee	9 episodes
2012	30 Rock	Chef	Episode: "Leap Day"
2012	Person of Interest	Glen	Episode: "Bury the Lede"
2013	Hawaii Five-0	David Toriyama	Episode: "Ho'onani Makuakane"
2014	Madam Secretary	Japanese Foreign Minister Shimbakura	Episode: "Just Another Normal Day"
2016	House of Cards	Dr. Krebs	Episode: "Chapter 50"
2017	The Deuce	Kim	2 episodes
2018	Paterno	Doctor	TV movie
2018	Instinct	Haru Onishi	Episode: "Heartless"
2018	Marvel's Iron Fist	Yu-Ti	Episode: "The City's Not for Burning"
2018	Elementary	Dr. Ken Fukata	Episode: "Uncanny Valley of the Dolls"
2019	Broad City	Trang	Episode: "Bitcoin & the Missing Girl"
2019	Modern Love	Kenji Inouye	Episode: "The Race Grows Sweeter"
2019	Prodigal Son	Dr. Higa	Episode: "The Surgeon"
2020	Altered Carbon	Tanaseda Hideki	Main role season 2
2020	Grey's Anatomy	Hershel Roberts	Episode: "Sing It Again"
2020	Dash & Lily	Arthur Mori	Recurring role
2023	The Company You Keep	Joseph	Main role
