= The Burdened =

- المرهقون
- Directed by: Amr Gamal
- Written by: Amr Gamal; Mazen Refaat
- Produced by: Mohsen Alkhalifi; Amr Gamal; Amjad Abu Alala
- Cinematography: Mrinal Desai
- Edited by: Heba Othman
- Music by: Chen Ming-chang
- Production company: Adenium Productions
- Distributed by: Films Boutiques (International); MAD solutions (Middle East)
- Release date: 18 February 2023 (Berlin)
- Running time: 91 minutes
- Countries: Yemen; Sudan; Saudi Arabia
- Language: Arabic

The Burdened (Arabic: المرهقون, romanized: al-Murhiqūn) is a 2023 drama film based on a true story. It is the second film directed by the Yemeni filmmaker Amr Gamal who co-wrote the script with Mazen Refaat. The film premiered in the Panorama section of the 73rd Berlin International Film Festival, winning the Audience Award (second place) and the Amnesty Award.

With this participation, it became the first Yemeni film ever to be officially selected for screening at the Berlinale.

It received widespread critical acclaim, and then it was screened at a number of international film festivals such as the Chicago International Film Festival, Sydney International Film Festival, Palm Springs International Film Festival, Shanghai International Film Festival, Seattle International Film Festival, Beijing International Film Festival, Valencia International Film Festival, Taipei International Film Festival, and Durban International Film Festival.

The film was selected for Yemen's official submission for the Best International Feature Film at the 96th Academy Awards.

== Plot ==
The film, set in 2019, tells a true story about a young Yemeni middle-class couple, Ahmed and Israa, and their three children in the city of Aden, Yemen. Israa discovers that she is pregnant again, causing shock to the couple, who lost their jobs after the civil war in 2015, which led to a crippling economic crisis in Yemen. Unable to afford the costs of raising an additional child, the couple decide to have an abortion.

In a society where abortion is culturally and religiously condemned, the family faces difficulties in accessing medical assistance due to the refusal of many doctors to help them with the abortion, and they avoid traditional methods due to Israa's anemia.

The couple turns to Israa's close friend, Dr. Mona, for help. Mona strongly refuses to help and warns Israa against having an abortion. When the couple reaches a dead end with doctors, Ahmed is able to find traditional midwifery services capable of performing the abortion at home. Mona discovers this and intervenes to stop the process at the crucial moment.

Finally, Mona is persuaded to help, and she decides to perform the procedure herself after seeing Israa's desperation. After the procedure, Mona suffers from intense regret and ignores Israa's attempts to contact her, while Israa feels fear and sorrow about the tension in her relationship with Mona, but Ahmed convinces her of the importance of continuing life for the sake of their children.

The film ends with a new day in Aden, where the family heads to the children's school, and on the parents' faces, there is a mixture of temporary relief and fear of the future.

== Cast ==
- Khaled Hamdan as Ahmed
- Abeer Mohammed as Isra'a
- Samah Alamrani as Muna
- Islam Saleem as Anwar
- Roaa Al-Hamshari as Nouran
- Omar Elyas as Nawar

== Production ==
In 2021, director Amr Gamal started shooting his second feature film, The Burdened, which was shot entirely in Aden City with a joint Yemeni and foreign crew. Due to the complex political situation in Yemen, filming continued for 70 days. Filming began on August 24, 2021, and ended on November 10, 2021. During filming, the cast and crew were stuck in a hotel in Aden for five days due to armed confrontations surrounding the hotel.

The Burdened is a co-production between Yemen, Sudan, and Saudi Arabia with the participation of artists and technicians from Yemen, Sudan, Egypt, Lebanon, India, the United Kingdom, Taiwan, and the Czech Republic.

The pre-production and production of the film were funded by Yemeni businessmen and the Yemeni government. As a result of the great success of the director's first film, 10 Days Before the Wedding, local businessmen, the government, and the Southern Transitional Council were interested in supporting his new film.

Later the film received post-production funding from the Karlovy Vary International Film Festival, Malmo Arab Film Festival, and the Red Sea International Film Festival.

== Release ==
On 18 February 2023, The Burdened became the first Yemeni film to be screened at the Berlin International Film Festival. It was later screened at a number of international film festivals, including those in Sydney, Shanghai, Beijing, Valencial, Taipei, and Durban. The film was commercially released in theaters in Taiwan on August 11, 2023, and in France, its commercial screenings began on January 31, 2024.

== Reception ==
The Burdened has received widespread critical acclaim from both film critics and audiences. The film won several awards at several international film festivals. Jonathan Romney of Screen International said, "What’s striking is how extremely spare and to the point Gamal’s storytelling style is: there’s zero fat on the bones of this story, giving the film a taut directness". Jay Weissberg of The Film Verdict said, "a rigorously controlled, moving evocation of a family exhausted by the difficulties of keeping it all together".

== Awards and nominations ==
Year	Award	Category	Nominee(s)	Result	Ref.
2023	Berlin International Film Festival	Amnesty Award	The Burdened	Won	
2023	Berlin International Film Festival	Panorama Audience Award	The Burdened	Won; Second Place	
2023	Valencia International Film Festival	Best Film	The Burdened	Nominated	
2023	Valencia International Film Festival	Jury Prize (Best Director)	The Burdened	Won	
2023	Valencia International Film Festival	Jury Prize (Best Writing)	The Burdened	Won	
2023	Durban International Film Festival	Best Film	The Burdened	Nominated	
2023	Durban International Film Festival	Best Writing	The Burdened	Won	
2023	Taipei Film Festival	Best Film (Grand Prize)	The Burdened	Nominated	
2023	Taipei Film Festival	Best Film (Special Jury Prize)	The Burdened	Won	
2023	Chicago International Film Festival	New Directors Competition	The Burdened	Won	
2023	Palm Springs International Film Festival	Best Foreign Language Film	The Burdened	Nominated	
2023	Palm Springs International Film Festival	New Voices Grand Jury Prize	The Burdened	Nominated	
2024	Seattle International Film Festival	New Directors. Competition.	The Burdened	Nominated	

== See also ==
- 10 Days Before the Wedding
- List of submissions to the 96th Academy Awards for Best International Feature Film
- List of Yemeni submissions for the Academy Award for Best International Feature Film
