= Sealed Cargo (2015 film) =

2015 film

- Film poster
- Directed by: Julia Vargas-Weise
- Written by: Juan Claudio Lechín; Julia Vargas-Weise
- Produced by: Pilar Valverde; Julia Vargas-Weise
- Starring: Gustavo Sánchez Parra
- Cinematography: Milton Guzmán
- Edited by: Daniel Prync; Miguel Pérez
- Release dates: 28 August 2015 (Venezuela); 25 February 2016 (Bolivia)
- Running time: 107 minutes
- Country: Bolivia
- Language: Spanish

Sealed Cargo (Spanish: Carga Sellada) is a 2015 Bolivian drama film directed by Julia Vargas-Weise. It was selected as the Bolivian entry for the Best Foreign Language Film at the 89th Academy Awards but it was not nominated.

== Plot ==
A police mariscal and his crew try to dump a mysterious freight of toxic minerals from a train, but the population has been alarmed.

== Cast ==
- Gustavo Sánchez Parra as Mariscal
- Luis Bredow as Agustin Klinger
- Fernando Arze as Antonio Urdimala
- Daniela Lema as Tania Tintaya
- Marcelo Nina as Choque
- Prakriti Maduro as Nena

== See also ==
- List of submissions to the 89th Academy Awards for Best Foreign Language Film
- List of Bolivian submissions for the Academy Award for Best Foreign Language Film
