= Julia Vargas-Weise =

Bolivian photographer, educator, and filmmaker (1942–2018)

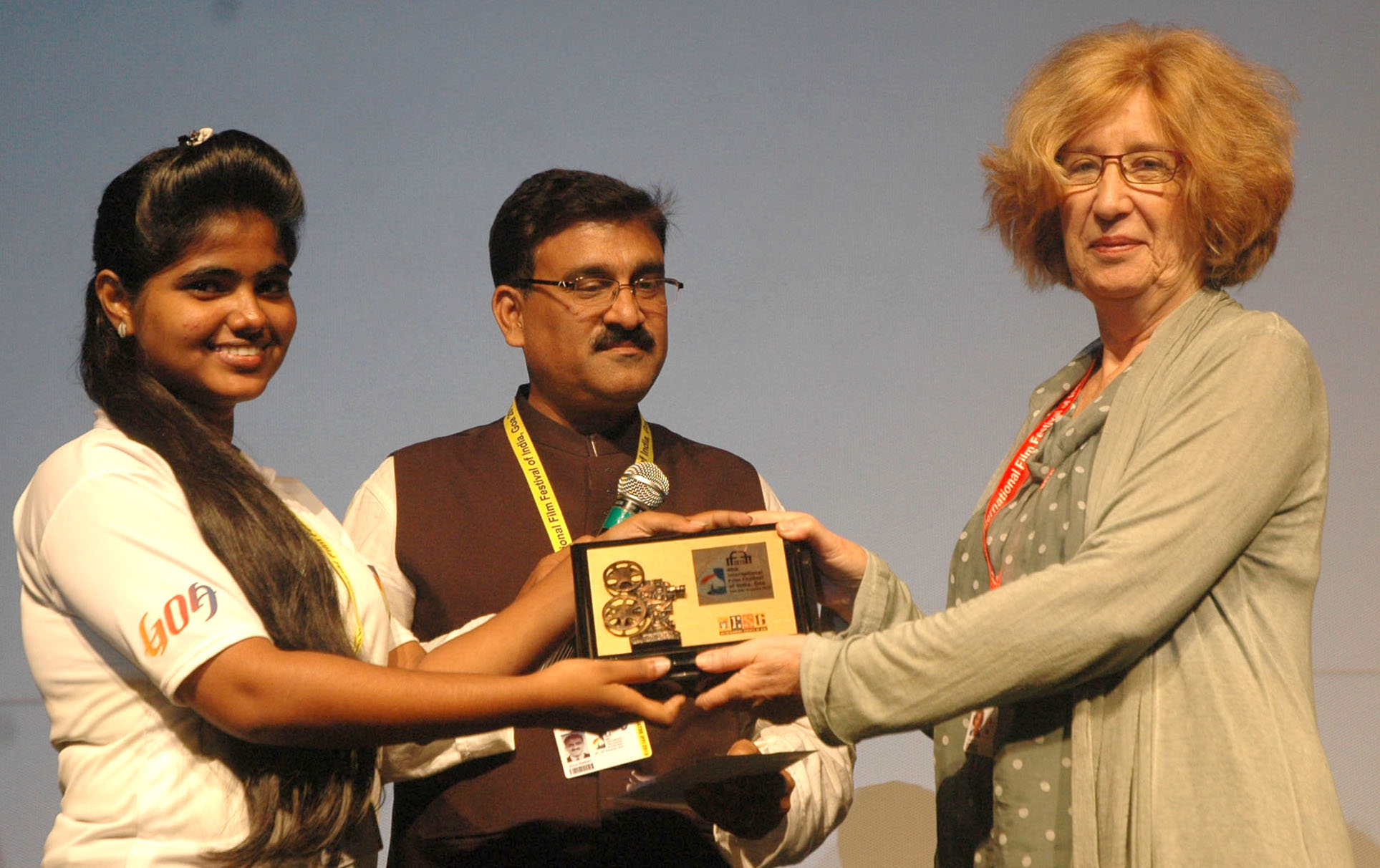
- Julia Vargas-Weise, IFFI (2015)
- Born: 1942; Cochabamba, Bolivia
- Died: 1 April 2018 (aged 76); Barcelona, Spain
- Occupations: Photographer, screenwriter, educator, film director
- Notable work: Sealed Cargo

Julia Vargas-Weise (1942 – 1 April 2018) was a Bolivian photographer, screenwriter, educator, and film director.

== Biography ==
Julia Vargas-Weise was born in Cochabamba in 1942. She trained professionally at the Ecole des Arts et Métiers in Vevey, Switzerland.

She became known as the first female professional photographer in Bolivia. She overcame discrimination to obtain fair recognition and valuation of her work, and from 1963 to the end of her life, she participated in 30 international photo exhibitions, including 17 solo exhibitions.

In 1980, she founded and directed a non-governmental organization which held audiovisual workshops for children and adolescents. In 1984, she worked in the film industry for the first time, as a still photographer for the feature Los Hermanos Cartagena. She went on to direct three films, including 2015's Sealed Cargo, which was selected as Bolivia's entry for the Academy Award for Best Foreign Film, but was not nominated. It also won special jury awards at the International Film Festival of India and the WorldFest-Houston International Film Festival.

Julia Vargas-Weise died in Barcelona on 1 April 2018 at age 76.

== Awards ==
- 2016: Best Director for Sealed Cargo at the Marbella International Film Festival
- 2017: Award for Contribution to Bolivian Cinema and Audiovisual Arts at the 17th Santa Cruz International Film Festival (FENAVID)

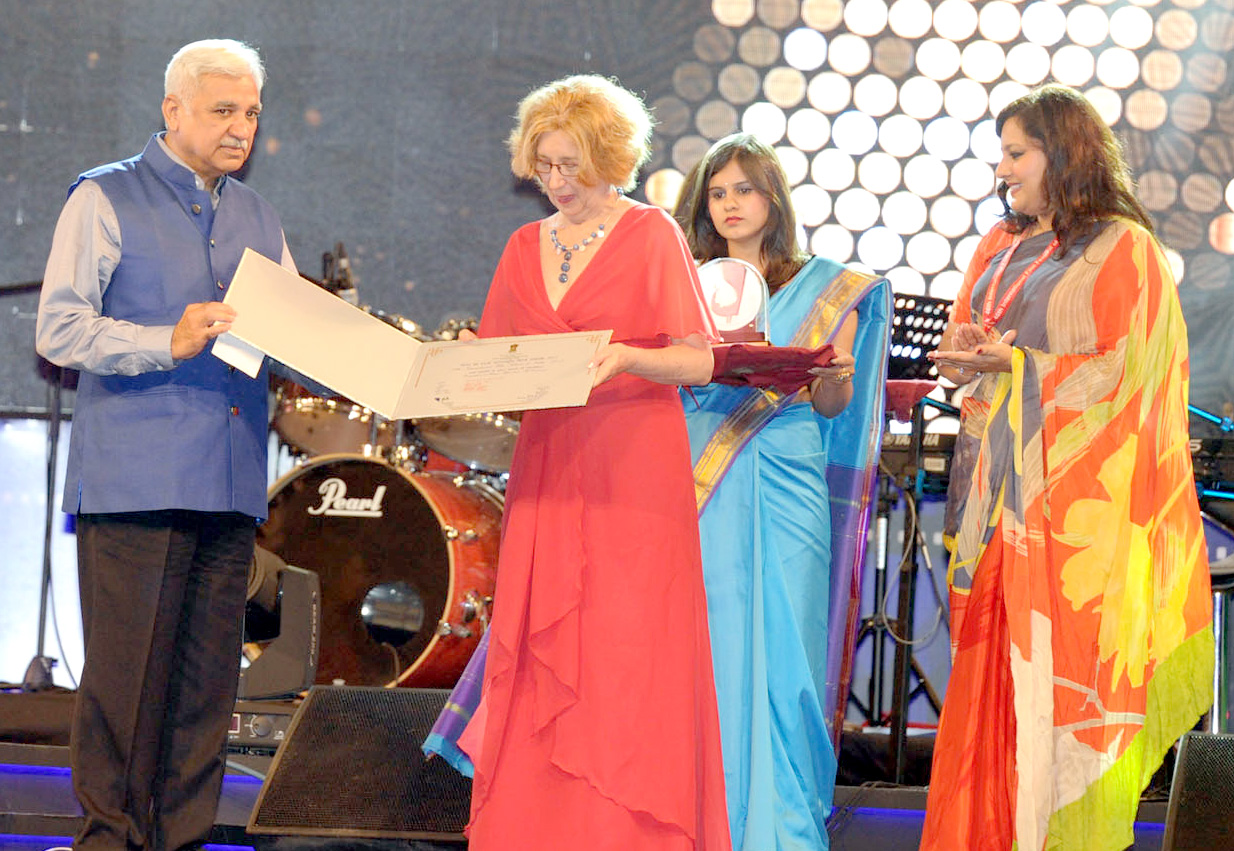
Julia Vargas receiving the Special Jury Award for the film Sealed Cargo, at IFFI (2006)

== Filmography ==
- Esito sería... (2004)
- Patricia, una vez basta (2006)
- Sealed Cargo (2015)

== Books ==
- Tierra adentro: obra fotográfica (1987)
