= Jimmy O. Yang =

Hong Kong-American comedian and actor (born 1987)

- 歐陽萬成
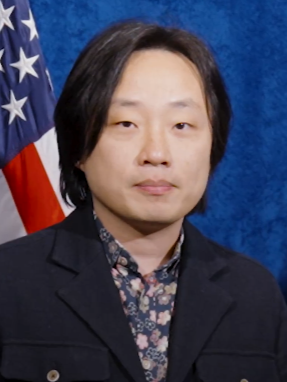
- Yang in 2024
- Born: Au-yeung Man-sing; June 11, 1987 (age 39); British Hong Kong
- Other names: Jimmy Ouyang; Jimmy O'Yang
- Education: University of California, San Diego (BA)
- Occupations: Actor, stand-up comedian
- Years active: 2008–present
- Father: Richard O. Yang

Chinese name
- Traditional Chinese: 歐陽萬成
- Simplified Chinese: 欧阳万成
Transcriptions
Standard Mandarin
- Hanyu Pinyin: Ōuyáng Wànchéng
- IPA: [óʊ.jǎŋ wân.ʈʂʰə̌ŋ]
Yue: Cantonese
- Yale Romanization: Āu-yèuhng Maahn-sìhng
- Jyutping: Au^{1}-joeng^{4} Maan^{6}-sing^{4}
- IPA: [ɐw˥.jœŋ˩ man˨.sɪŋ˩]
- Website: jimmycomedy.com

Jimmy O. Yang (Chinese: 歐陽萬成, Cantonese Romanisation: Āu Yèuhng Maahn Sìhng; born June 11, 1987) is a Hong Kong–American stand-up comedian and actor. As an actor, he is best known for starring as Jian-Yang in the HBO comedy series Silicon Valley, as Dr. Chan Kaifang in the Netflix comedy series Space Force, as Bernard Tai in the Warner Bros. Pictures romantic comedy film Crazy Rich Asians and as Josh Lin in the Netflix romantic comedy film Love Hard.

== Early life ==
Yang's parents were both from Shanghai and later moved to Hong Kong, where he was born. In 2000, when Yang was 13, his family immigrated to the United States and settled in Los Angeles, California. His aunt and grandmother were already living in the U.S.; his parents joined them primarily to allow Yang and his brother, Roy, access to a better education. Yang enrolled at John Burroughs Middle School for eighth grade, then later attended Beverly Hills High School.

Yang graduated from the University of California, San Diego with a degree in economics in 2009. The commencement speaker at his college graduation was his future Silicon Valley showrunner and fellow UCSD alumnus Mike Judge.

== Career ==
Yang did his first stand-up set at 21 years old as "Lowball Jim" at the Ha Ha Comedy Club between June 2008 and June 2009 in North Hollywood, Los Angeles.

After graduation, he interned at the financial consulting firm Smith Barney in Beverly Hills, California, but found it unfulfilling and turned down its return offer. Instead, he returned to San Diego to finish his graduation requirements. He stayed in the city afterward, where he sold used cars, DJed at a strip club, and seated customers at a comedy club to support himself while doing stand-up sets for free at The Comedy Palace. There he met his mentor, Sean Kelly, a stand-up comedian who ran the venue and later created the reality show Storage Hunters.

When Yang moved back to Los Angeles, he signed up with Central Casting, due to their low barrier of entry, and with various casting websites. He was spurred to consider acting when a friend told him there was money to be made in residual checks from commercials. In the interim, he did stand-up sets around Southern California and signed up for acting classes. He eventually found acting representation through the Vesta Talent Agency.

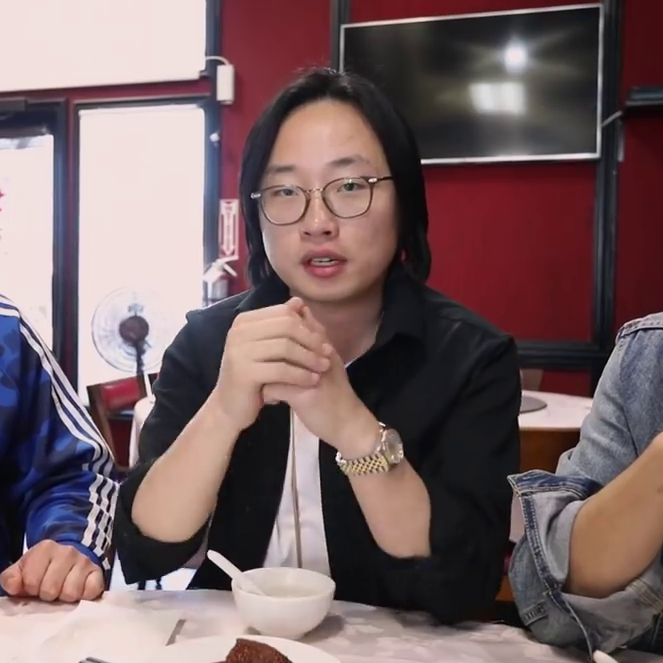
Yang in 2018

Yang made his television debut on the CBS series 2 Broke Girls in 2012, and his first late-night stand-up appearance on The Arsenio Hall Show in 2014. He played Tang-See in season 9 of It's Always Sunny in Philadelphia, and appeared in an episode of Criminal Minds as Nathan Chow, a high-school student who suffered a psychotic break. He was a writer/consultant for the Harlem Globetrotters, and voiced roles in the video game Infamous Second Son.

He initially appeared on Silicon Valley in a guest role, making scale, then $900 per episode. He appeared in three episodes and spent the money on a Prius so he could drive for Uber to earn money between the show's first and second seasons. For season 2, he was promoted to series regular. Prior to the announcement, he had landed a series-regular role on the Yahoo! Screen original television show Sin City Saints. He turned down the offer because it would have required him to quit Silicon Valley, which ran from 2014 to 2019.

Yang's first dramatic role was as Dun "Danny" Meng, a Chinese immigrant who is carjacked by the Tsarnaev brothers, in the 2016 action drama Patriots Day.

In 2018, he played Bernard Tai in the romantic comedy film Crazy Rich Asians, directed by Jon M. Chu.

On September 26, 2019, it was announced that Yang was cast as Dr. Chan Kaifang in the Netflix comedy series Space Force.

In 2020, he starred opposite Ryan Hansen in two films, Like a Boss and Fantasy Island, released a month apart. In the first film, their characters were business partners; and in the second, they were step-siblings who were strongly fond of each other.

Yang's comedy special Good Deal was released on Amazon Prime Video on May 8, 2020. In 2021, he starred opposite Nina Dobrev in Netflix's Love Hard, his first romantic film. His second comedy special, Guess How Much? was released on Prime Video on May 2, 2023.

Yang starred as the voice of the Monkey King in Netflix's animated movie, The Monkey King, which debuted August 18, 2023.

In 2024, Yang played the lead role in the Hulu series Interior Chinatown as Willis Wu. Also in 2024, Yang guest starred in the TikTok short series Natural Habitat Shorts, as the voice of Fathah Christmas, a porcupine.

=== Author ===
Yang is also the author of How to American: An Immigrant's Guide to Disappointing Your Parents, a book where "he shares his story of growing up as a Chinese immigrant who pursued a Hollywood career against the wishes of his parents." Mike Judge wrote the foreword.

Yang has also continued doing stand-up comedy; in 2018, he appeared on a tour titled after the book.

== Personal life ==
Along with English, Yang speaks Shanghainese, Cantonese and Mandarin Chinese. Yang's father, Richard Ouyang, later signed with the same talent agency and has appeared in several films, including playing the father of his son's character in Patriots Day.

Yang became an American citizen in 2015. He has a YouTube channel with a focus on cooking.

Yang was previously in a relationship with Brianne Kimmel, an American venture capitalist.

== Name ==
The "O." in Yang's name is not a middle initial, but rather part of his family name. Yang's family name in Mandarin Chinese is Ouyang 歐陽 OH-yahng, but as this proved difficult for non-Mandarin speakers to pronounce due to the confluence of four vowels at the beginning, he began writing it as "O. Yang" as a phonetic cue.

== Works ==
=== Television ===
Year	Title	Role	Notes
2012	2 Broke Girls	Person in Line	Episode: "And the Secret Ingredient"
2013	Agents of S.H.I.E.L.D.	Chinese Teenager #1	Episode: "Girl in the Flower Dress"
2013	It's Always Sunny in Philadelphia	Tang-See	Episode: "Flowers for Charlie"
2014	Things You Shouldn't Say Past Midnight	Phil	Recurring
2014	New Girl	Steve	Episode: "Dice"
2014	Criminal Minds	Nathan Chow	Episode: "Burn"
2014–2019	Silicon Valley	Jian-Yang	Recurring role (season 1); main role (seasons 2–6)
2015	Battle Creek	Chang	Episode: "Mama's Boy"
2016	Those Who Can't	James Chen	Guest, 3 episodes
2016	Broken	Donny	Guest, 3 episodes
2016–2017	American Dad!	Hisashi / Frat Guy (voice)	2 episodes
2018	Another Period	Eng Bunker	Episode: "Lucky Chang's"
2018	The Simpsons	Sun Tzu (voice)	Episode: "No Good Read Goes Unpunished"
2018	Drunk History	Genghis Khan	Episode: "The Middle Ages"
2018–2019	Fresh Off the Boat	Horace	3 episodes
2020	We Bare Bears: The Movie	Joey Raccoon (voice)	TV movie
2020–2022	Space Force	Dr. Chan Kaifang	Recurring role (Season 1); main role (season 2)
2022	Beavis and Butt-Head	Doctor #2 (voice)	Episode: "The Kidney/The Good Deed"
2023	American Born Chinese	Ao Guang	Episode: "Make a Splash"
2024	Sausage Party: Foodtopia	Energy Drink (voice)	Episode: "Fifth Course"
2024	Gremlins: The Wild Batch	Little Big (voice)	Episode: "Always Be Ready for Adventure"
2024	Interior Chinatown	Willis Wu	10 episodes
2024	Jentry Chau vs. the Underworld	Peng Chau (voice)	4 episodes
2024	Natural Habitat Shorts	Fathah Christmas Porcupine	1 episode

=== Film ===
Year	Title	Role	Notes
2013	The Internship	Wa Zao	Uncredited
2016	Patriots Day	Dun Meng	
2017	El Camino Christmas	Mike the Cameraman	
2018	Juliet, Naked	Elliot	Uncredited
2018	Life of the Party	Tyler	
2018	Crazy Rich Asians	Bernard Tai	
2018	The Happytime Murders	Officer Delancey	
2019	The Lego Movie 2: The Second Part	Zebe (voice)	
2020	Like a Boss	Ron	
2020	Fantasy Island	Brax "Tattoo" Weaver	
2020	The Opening Act	Will Chu	
2021	Wish Dragon	Short Goon (voice)	
2021	Love Hard	Josh Lin	
2022	Beavis and Butt-Head Do the Universe	Flight Specialist Jung / Jeff (voice)	
2022	Minions: The Rise of Gru	Henchman #1 (voice)	
2022	Easter Sunday	Marvin	
2022	Me Time	Stan Berman	
2023	80 for Brady	Tony	
2023	Rally Road Racers	Zhi (voice)	
2023	The Monkey King	The Monkey King (voice)	
2025	Roofman	Used Car Salesman	
2026	Rock Springs	He Yew	
2026	Kung Fu Soccer	Stadium manager	
2026	Hexed †	TBA (voice)	

=== Video games ===
Year	Title	Role	Notes
2014	Infamous Second Son	Male Pedestrian #5	Voice

=== Stand-up tours ===
Year	Title	Notes
2018	How to American	Performed six shows at Punch Line San Francisco from May 25 to 27, 2018.
2019–2020	Good Deal	Toured cities including San Francisco, Seattle, Philadelphia, New York and San Jose. Later developed into his first comedy special, which premiered on Amazon Prime Video in 2020. Filmed at Neptune Theater in Seattle.
2022–2023	Guess How Much?	Tour locations include: USA: San Francisco (Golden Gate Theatre), Chicago and New York; Australia: Brisbane (The Tivoli), Melbourne (Playhouse), and Sydney (Just For Laughs, Sydney Opera House).; Later developed into his second comedy special, released on May 2, 2023, on Amazon Prime Video.
2024–2025	Big & Tall	Tour locations include: USA: San Francisco (Golden Gate Theatre), San Diego (Civic Theatre), New York (Carnegie Hall), Boston, Chicago, Phoenix, Los Angeles (The Forum), Minneapolis, Nashville, Washington D.C., Houston, Honolulu and Las Vegas; Canada: Vancouver（Orpheum）; Hong Kong; Five shows to be performed in Hong Kong at the Hong Kong Coliseum from June 13 to 16.: Macau; Three shows to be performed in Macau at Broadway Macau from July 4 to 6.: UK: London (Wembley Arena); Netherlands: Amsterdam (RAI Theater); Australia: Brisbane, Sydney, Melbourne

=== Books ===
How to American: An Immigrant's Guide to Disappointing Your Parents (2018)
