= Amr Gamal (director) =

Yemeni film director

- عمرو جمال
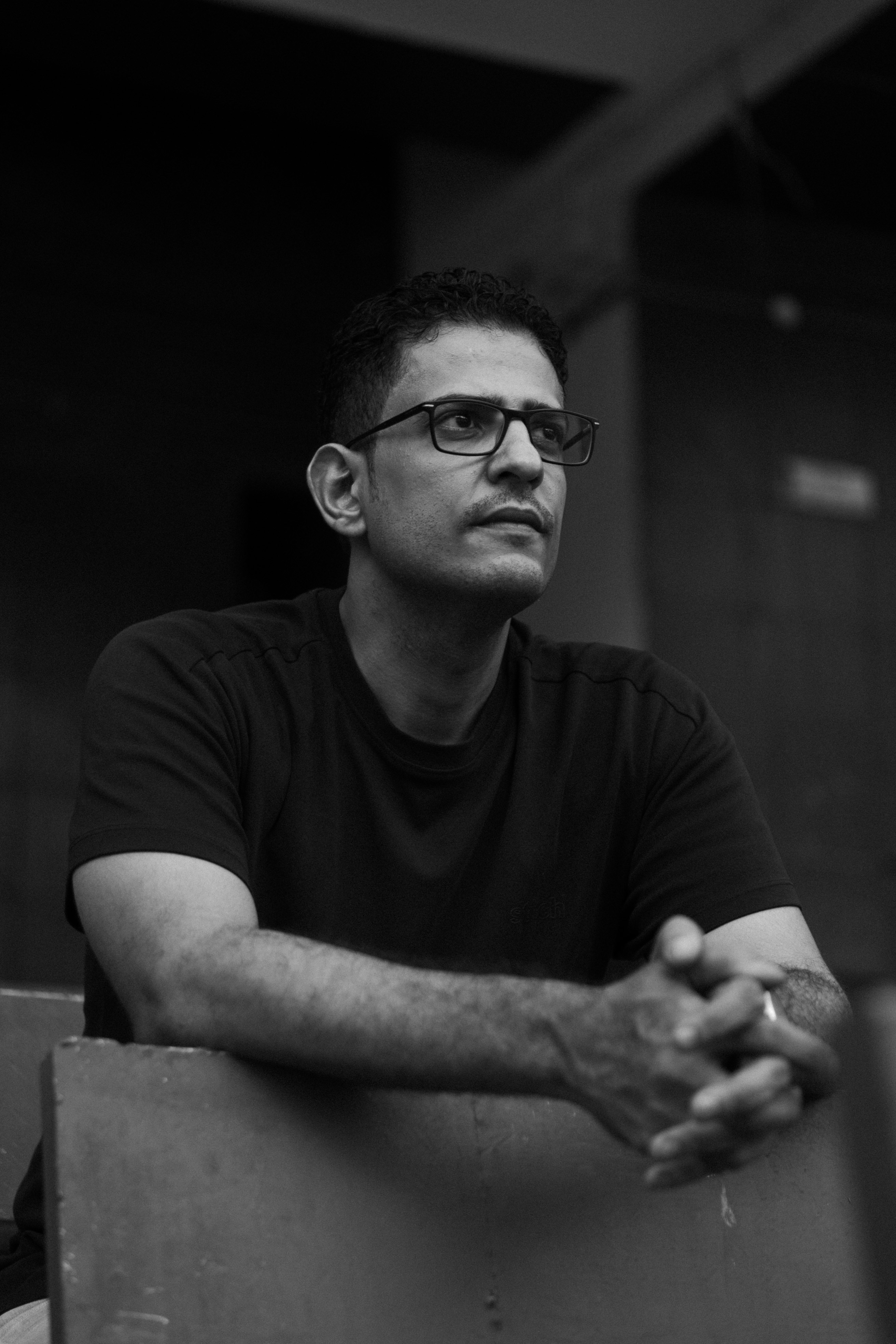
- Born: 14 July 1983 (age 43); Poznań, Poland
- Education: University of Aden
- Occupations: Film director, screenwriter, film producer
- Years active: 2005–present
- Notable work: 10 Days Before the Wedding; The Burdened
- Website: https://theamrgamal.info/

Amr Gamal (Arabic: عمرو جمال; born 14 July 1983) is a Yemeni film and theatre director, producer, and writer. He founded Khaleej Aden Theater Troupe in the Yemeni city of Aden in 2005 to revive commercial theater in Yemen after a years-long hiatus due to the consequences of the 1994 civil war.

In 2018, Amr directed his first feature film, 10 Days Before the Wedding, which achieved great public success in Yemen and became Yemen's official entry for the International Feature Film category at the 91st Academy Awards.

His second film, The Burdened (2023), became the first Yemeni film to be screened at the Berlin Film Festival. The film also participated in a number of prestigious international film festivals and won many awards.

== Early life ==
Amr was born in Poznan, Poland to Yemeni parents who were studying there. Amr returned to Aden with his parents in 1989, where he attended primary and secondary school and graduated from the Faculty of Engineering at the University of Aden in 2007.

Amr's relationship with theater started with the school theater, where he led the theater troupe of Lutfi Jafar Aman High School in 1999 and then led the Aden City School Theater Troupe in 2000.

In 2001, Amr received the Prestigious President of Yemen Award in playwriting for his play The Sixth Column, becoming the youngest Yemeni to win this award at the time.

== Film career ==
In the spring of 2018, Amr began the production of his first feature film, 10 Days Before the Wedding. The film premiered in Aden during the summer of the same year, becoming the first film to be commercially released in Yemen in four decades.

As a result of the destruction of the infrastructure in Aden due to successive wars and the deterioration of cinemas due to negligence, Amr was forced to rent two wedding halls to show the movie inside. Amr asked his team to build plywood screens in the two halls, and then they painted them white to screen the movie on them.

The premiere of the film took place in Aden on 21 August 2018, at the two wedding halls, with five screenings daily in each hall. The film achieved great commercial success, as the screenings lasted for more than eight months. Later, the film became Yemen's official selection for the Oscar for Best Foreign Film of 2019. The film also participated in a number of international and Arab festivals and won a number of awards.

In 2021, Amr Gamal started shooting his second feature film, The Burdened, which was shot entirely in Aden with a joint Yemeni and foreign crew. In February 2023, The Burdened became the first Yemeni film to be screened at the Berlin International Film Festival, and the film also won a number of awards at international festivals. The Burdened was a co-production between Yemen, Sudan, and Saudi Arabia with the participation of artists and technicians from Yemen, Sudan, Egypt, Lebanon, India, the United Kingdom, Taiwan, and the Czech Republic. It also receives post-production funding from the Karlovy Vary International Film Festival and the Red Sea International Film Festival.

== Theater career ==
In 2005, Amr Gamal and his colleagues founded Khaleej Aden Theater Troupe, a theater troupe that has revived commercial theater in Yemen since the interruption of commercial theatrical performances after 1994 civil war in Yemen.

Amr wrote and directed nine plays between 2005 and 2023, and his play Ma'ak Nazel became the first Yemeni play to be performed in Europe, where it was performed in 2010 at the GRIPS Theater in Berlin for two consecutive days. Tickets were sold out days before the live performances.

=== Khaleej Aden Theater Troupe ===
Amr and his colleagues founded Khaleej Aden Theater Troupe in Aden City in May 2005. The troupe's debut was through the play Family Dot Com, written and directed by Amr Gamal, which was performed on May 5, 2005, as part of the "Second Aden Theater Nights Festival".

Before founding Khaleej Aden Troupe, the founding members worked together on short plays written and directed by Amr Gamal as part of school theater activities between 1998 and 2001.

As a result of the 1994 civil war in Yemen, most of the theaters in Aden City were destroyed, and thus most commercial theater performances stopped. Some theatrical troupes that remained active at the time performed their plays as part of national theater festivals or within government national celebrations, which were rarely organized.

Due to all these circumstances, the members of Khaleej Aden troupe, led by Amr Gamal, began looking for alternative options in order to secure a venue to perform their commercial plays, and they chose the Hurricane Cinema Theatre, which is considered one of the oldest cinemas in the Arabian Peninsula, as it was opened in Aden during the 1950s.

Hurricane Cinema opened its doors to Khaleej Aden Troupe in 2006. This partnership between the cinema and the troupe bore fruit, as during the years between 2006 and 2023, all of the troupe's plays that were hosted by the cinema were a great commercial success.

With an estimated audience of 350 people, Khaleej Aden troupe performed its first play, Family Dot Com, at the Hurricane Cinema Theatre in 2006. The success of the play led to increased public interest in attending the next Khaleej Aden troupe plays, so many Yemenis were traveling to Aden specifically to attend theatrical performances during the holiday seasons. By 2008, the number of attendees exceeded 800 per performance, and the troupe also performed more than one play in the city of Sana'a.

In June 2010, Khaleej Aden became the first Yemeni troupe to perform one of their plays in Europe, as the troupe performed Ma'ak Nazel, directed by Amr Gamal, at the GRIPS Theater in Berlin.

In January 2023, Gamal directed Khaleej Aden Troupe's Adeni Arabic production of Hamlet (originally by the English playwright William Shakespeare). The play was performed on a specially built stage in Aden's Legislative Council[ar], formerly St. Maria's Church. To achieve this performance, the troupe restored the historic church building, which was partially damaged due to the 2015 war, from its own budget.

Hamlet was funded in cooperation with the British Council, which linked the Khaleej Aden Troupe with Shakespeare's Globe Theater in London and the Volcano Theater in Wales, which provided counseling and training sessions for the troupe members for a full year. The Adeni version of Hamlet received wide media attention, most notably the arrival of The Sunday Times correspondents from London to Aden to cover the premiere for the prestigious newspaper. The expanded report was published on the pages of the newspaper in the issue of March 19, 2023.

== Filmography ==
- 10 Days Before the Wedding, 2018 (Director, Writer, Producer)
- The Burdened, 2023 (Director, Writer, Producer)

== Theater ==
- The Sixth Column, 2000 (Director, Playwright, Actor)
- Family Dot Com, 2005 (Director, Playwright, Producer)
- Pygmalion, 2009 (Director, Producer)
- Ma'ak Nazel, 2009 (Director, Adaptation, Producer)
- Red Card, 2010 (Director, Playwright, Producer)
- Reckless Renovation, 2014 (Director, Playwright, Producer)
- Hamlet, 2023 (Director, Producer)

== Awards and nominations ==
Year	Award	Category	Nominee(s)	Result	Ref.
2023	Berlin International Film Festival	Amnesty Award	The Burdened	Won	
2023	Berlin International Film Festival	Panorama Audience Award	The Burdened	Won; Second Place	
2023	Valencia International Film Festival	Best Film	The Burdened	Nominated	
2023	Valencia International Film Festival	Jury Prize (Best Director)	The Burdened	Won	
2023	Valencia International Film Festival	Jury Prize (Best Writing)	The Burdened	Won; Shared with: Mazen Refa'at	
2023	Durban International Film Festival	Best Film	The Burdened	Nominated	
2023	Durban International Film Festival	Best Writing	The Burdened	Won; Shared with: Mazen Refa'at	
2023	Yerevan International Film Festival	Best Asian Film	The Burdened	Nominated	
2023	Taipei Film Festival	Best Film (Grand Prize)	The Burdened	Nominated	
2023	Taipei Film Festival	Best Film (Special Jury Prize)	The Burdened	Won	
2019	Jaipur International Film Festival	Best Film	10 Days Before the Wedding	Nominated	
2019	Aswan International Women's Film Festival	Best Film	10 Days Before the Wedding	Nominated	
2019	Aswan International Women's Film Festival	Best Film (Special Jury Prize)	10 Days Before the Wedding	Won	
2019	San Diego Arab Film Festival	Best Film (Audience Award)	10 Days Before the Wedding	Won	
2019	Amman Arab Film Festival	Best Film (Audience Award)	10 Days Before the Wedding	Won	
2019	Casablanca Arab Film Festival	Best Film	10 Days Before the Wedding	Nominated	
2019	Casablanca Arab Film Festival	Best Writing	10 Days Before the Wedding	Won; Shared with: Mazen Refa'at	
2019	Zanzibar International Film Festival	Best Film	10 Days Before the Wedding	Nominated	
