= Elsewhere (2019 film) =

2019 American comedy-drama film

- Film poster
- Directed by: Hernán Jiménez
- Written by: Hernán Jiménez
- Produced by: Chris Cole; J. Todd Harris
- Starring: Aden Young; Parker Posey; Ken Jeong; Beau Bridges; Jacki Weaver
- Cinematography: Glauco Bermudez
- Edited by: Miguel Coto Coto
- Music by: Mark Orton
- Production companies: Evoke; Branded Pictures Entertainment; Brightlight Pictures
- Distributed by: Freestyle Digital Media
- Release date: November 14, 2019 (Napa Valley Film Festival)
- Running time: 98 minutes
- Country: United States
- Language: English

Elsewhere is a 2019 American comedy-drama film written and directed by Hernán Jiménez and starring Aden Young, Parker Posey, Ken Jeong, Beau Bridges and Jacki Weaver.

== Plot ==
Carpenter Bruno (Aden Young) and his wife Lydia built their dream home on Lydia's father's property. When Lydia dies without leaving a will, Bruno is evicted and moves into his father's shed. Marie (Parker Posey) purchases Bruno's former home and hires Bruno to help her remodel it. Bruno and Marie fall in love and enter a romantic relationship. While he is renovating the kitchen, Bruno finds Lydia's will, which leaves the home to Bruno. Marie is then evicted and Bruno moves into the home.

== Cast ==
- Aden Young as Bruno
- Parker Posey as Marie
- Ken Jeong as Felix
- Beau Bridges as Dad
- Jacki Weaver as Mom
- Jackie Tohn as Rita Maloney
- Scott Hylands as Mr. Black
