= Brianne Kimmel =

American venture capitalist

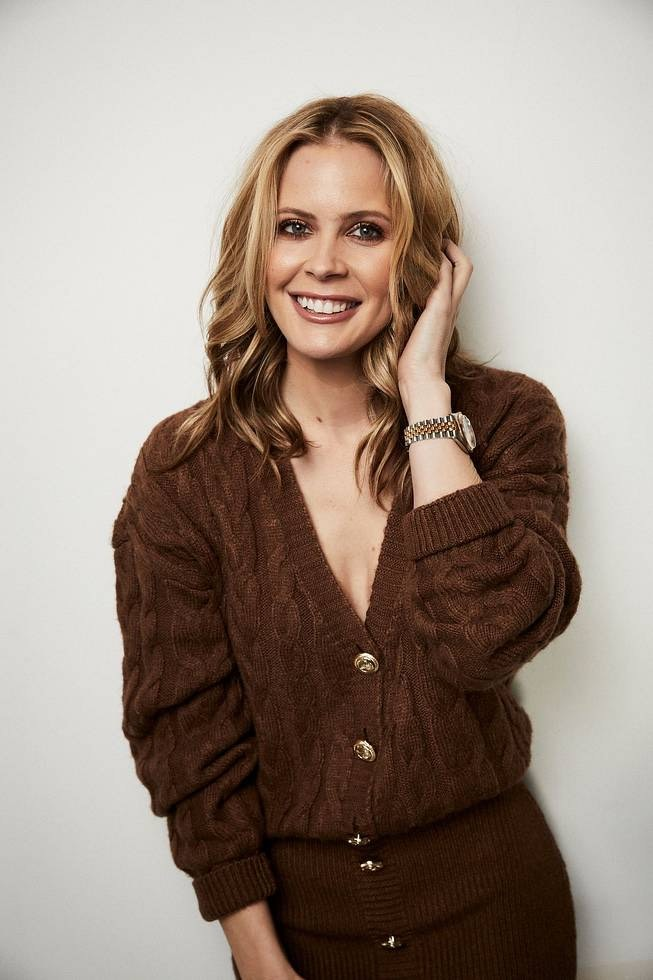
- Kimmel in 2023
- Education: Kent State University
- Occupation: Venture Capitalist
- Known for: Founder, Worklife Ventures
- Website: briannekimmel.com

Brianne Kimmel is a Ukrainian-American venture capitalist and angel investor. She is the founder and managing partner of Worklife Ventures, a venture capital firm she founded in 2019.

== Early life and education ==
Kimmel is originally from Ukraine but grew up in Youngstown, Ohio. She attended a semester at Barclay College in Haviland, KS in 2010. She earned a degree in journalism from Kent State University.

== Career ==
After graduation, Kimmel went to Sydney where she worked at an advertising agency. She later moved back to the United States where she worked for Expedia and taught classes at General Assembly. She developed the concept for a venture capital fund while working at Zendesk.

Kimmel launched Worklife Ventures in 2019, raising $5 million in capital. An additional $35 million was raised in 2022 with the total market cap of all portfolio companies in the fund reaching $40 million value the same year.
