= Mak Nazl =

- Music: Birger Heymann
- Basis: Linie 1
- Premiere: October 15, 2009: Sanaa, Yemen

Mak Nazl (Arabic: معك نازل) is a Yemeni Arabic-language adaptation of the German musical Linie 1, originally written by Volker Ludwig for the Berlin-based GRIPS Theater. The adaptation was created by the Khaleej Aden Theater Troupe, directed by Amr Gamal, and premiered in 2009. Mak Nazl is widely regarded as a landmark in Yemeni theater, praised for its cultural adaptation, exploration of social issues, and its groundbreaking international success, becoming the first Yemeni play to be performed in Europe.

== Background and origins ==
Linie 1, a musical that debuted in 1986 in Berlin, was written by Volker Ludwig for the GRIPS Theater, known for its socially conscious performances aimed at young audiences. The play follows the journey of a runaway girl on the Berlin subway and her interactions with various characters who represent the diversity and social challenges of urban life. Linie 1 became one of Germany's most iconic theatrical works, translated into over 20 languages and performed worldwide.

The Yemeni adaptation Mak Nazl was conceived after The German House in Yemen, impressed by the success of the Khaleej Aden Theater Troupe, proposed that the troupe adapt Linie 1 for Yemeni audiences. Amr Gamal, the director and founder of the troupe, took on the challenge of adapting the play, transforming it into a uniquely Yemeni narrative that resonated with local audiences while maintaining the universal themes of the original work.

== Plot ==
The Yemeni version of Linie 1 centers on Amal, a young rural woman who falls victim to a "tourist marriage"—a practice where wealthy men from neighboring countries temporarily marry Yemeni women, only to abandon them after a short period. Amal is left pregnant and alone in her village after her husband disappears. A year later, she learns that her husband has returned to Aden and sets out on a journey to find him. Lost and vulnerable at the bus station, Amal meets a diverse group of young people from Aden, each representing different aspects of the city's social fabric. Through her interactions, she learns about the struggles of urban life, the challenges faced by Aden's youth, and ultimately finds solace in a new relationship with a young man from the city.

The play retains the structure of Linie 1 but grounds its characters and narrative firmly in the Yemeni context, addressing local issues such as economic hardship, social injustice, and the pressures faced by marginalized groups.

== Production history ==
=== Premiere and early performances ===
Mak Nazl premiered on 15 October 2009 at the Cultural Center in Sana'a, where it ran for one week. Following its successful run in Sana'a, the play was performed for an entire season at the historic Hurricane Cinema in Aden. This venue, which had been one of the few spaces for cultural expression after the destruction of many theaters following Yemen's 1994 civil war, became a symbolic setting for the revival of Aden's theatrical tradition.

The play's popularity grew rapidly, and it was broadcast on Yemeni television, allowing a wider national audience to experience the production. The broadcast further cemented Mak Nazl 's status as a cultural phenomenon, and the play became widely discussed across the country.

=== International performance in Berlin ===
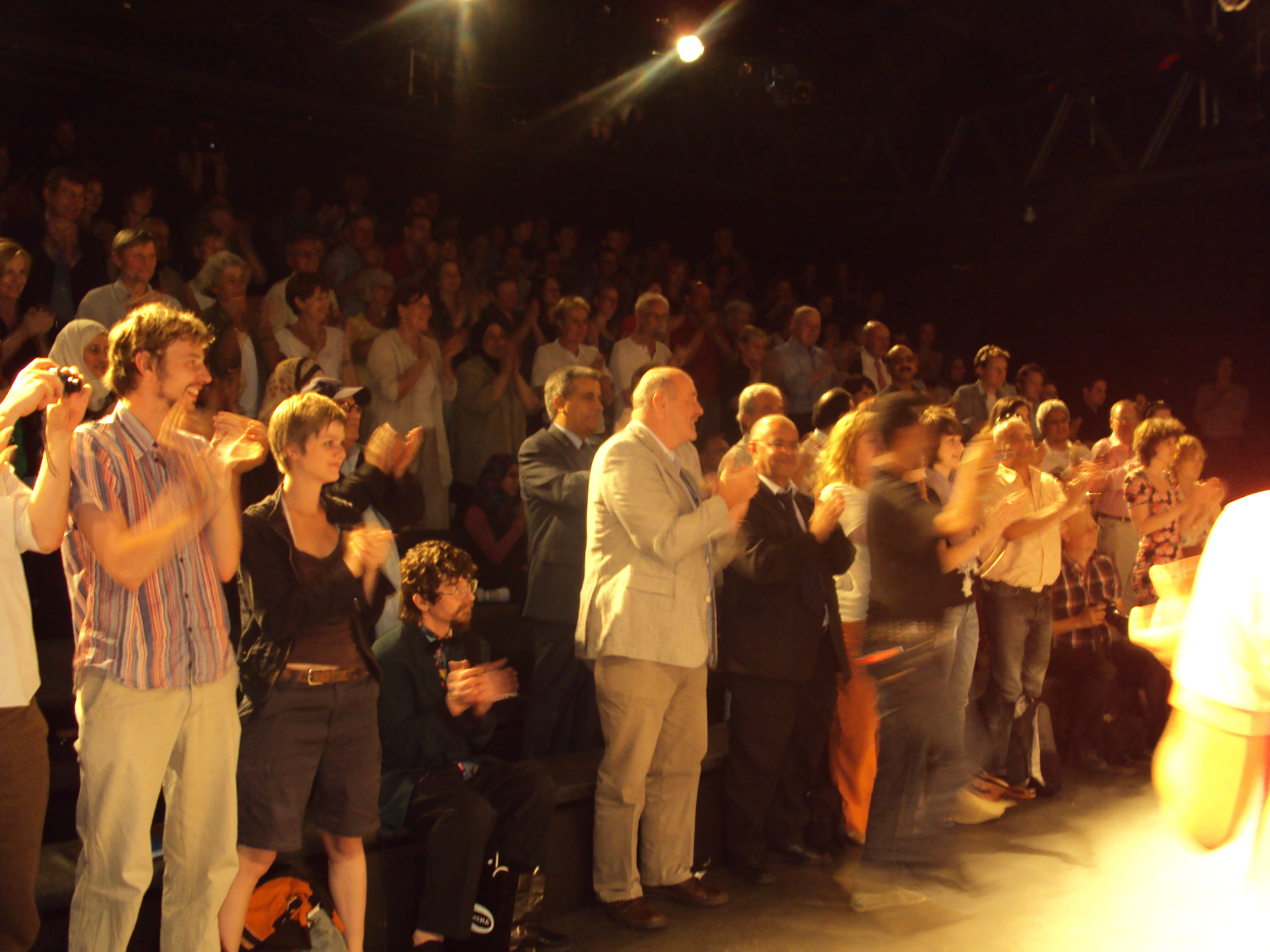
Audience giving a standing ovation following a performance of Mal Nazl in Berlin

On 11 and 12 June 2010, the Khaleej Aden Theater Troupe performed Mak Nazl at the Grips Theater in Berlin, making it the first Yemeni play ever performed in Europe. The performance was facilitated by the German House in Yemen, which supported the troupe's travel and promotion. The musical continued to be performed in Arabic, with German subtitles provided. The Berlin performances were met with enthusiasm, with tickets selling out days in advance. The play received a standing ovation that lasted for nearly eight minutes—a rare honor in Berlin's theater scene. The German press praised the production for its originality and for successfully conveying Yemeni culture to a European audience, despite the language barrier.

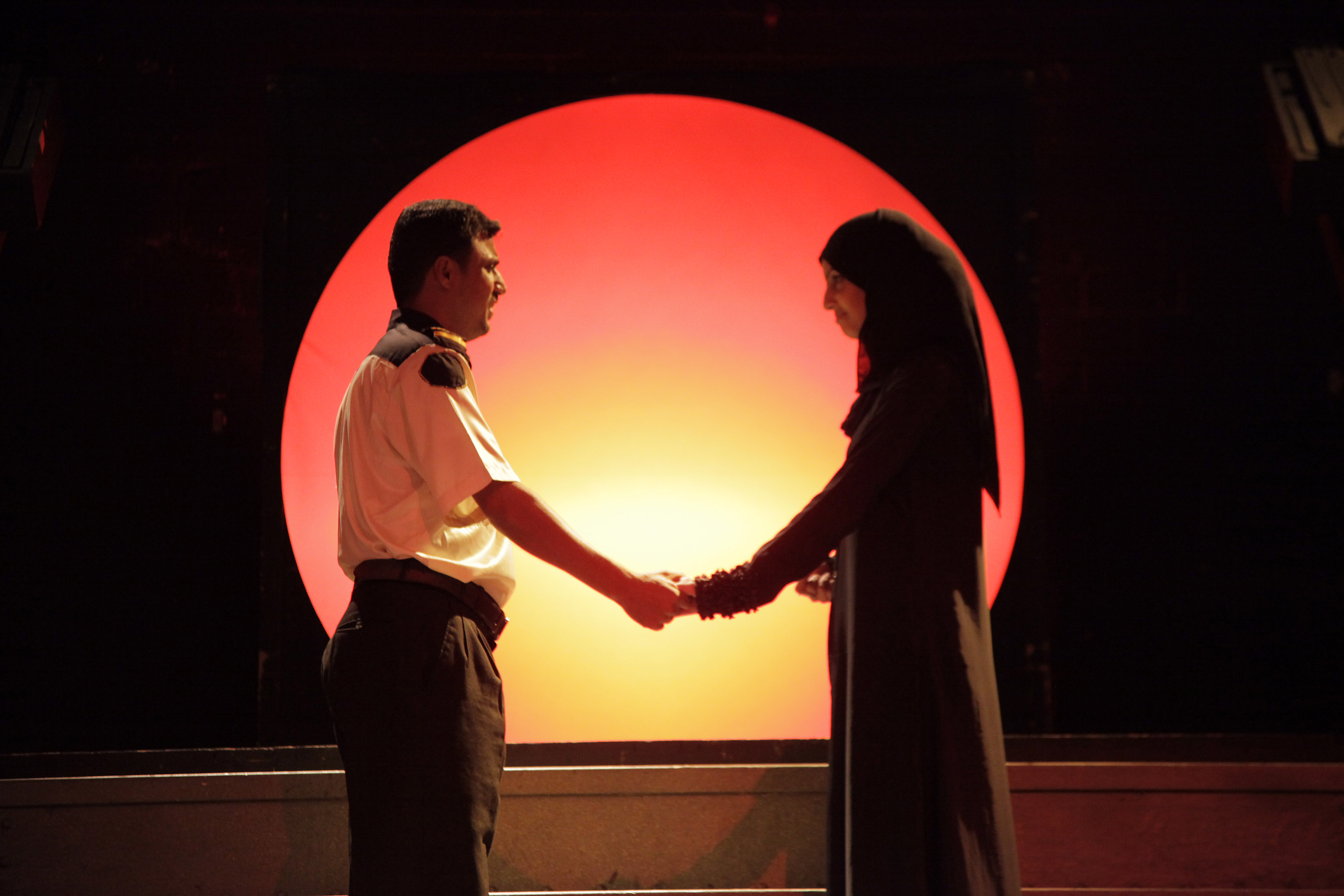
Khaled Hamdan and Ghida Gamal in the final scene of Mak Nazl, performed at Grips Theater in Berlin.

== Themes and cultural significance ==
Mak Nazl, through the character of Amal, tackles the issue of temporary marriages, a practice that leaves many Yemeni women in vulnerable situations. This adaptation also addresses broader themes of marginalization, economic struggles, and the quest for personal agency.

One of the key elements of Mak Nazl's success was its ability to blend local Yemeni culture with the universal themes of Linie 1. The play is infused with references to Aden's cultural heritage, including its dialect, traditional clothing, and music, which resonated deeply with Yemeni audiences. At the same time, the play's focus on societal issues such as unemployment, urbanization, and the generational divide allowed it to connect with audiences on a broader scale.

== Music and choreography ==
The original score of Linie 1, composed by Birger Heymann, was rearranged by Yemeni composer Marwan Al-Hammadi. Director Amr Gamal also rewrote the lyrics of the songs in the Adeni dialect, ensuring that the music reflected Yemeni cultural identity. The songs were performed by prominent Yemeni singers, including Shorouq, Hadeel Al-Hamshari, Moath Khan, and Yasser Shan. The music was produced at the Yemeni House of Music under the supervision of renowned Yemeni musician Fouad Shargabi.

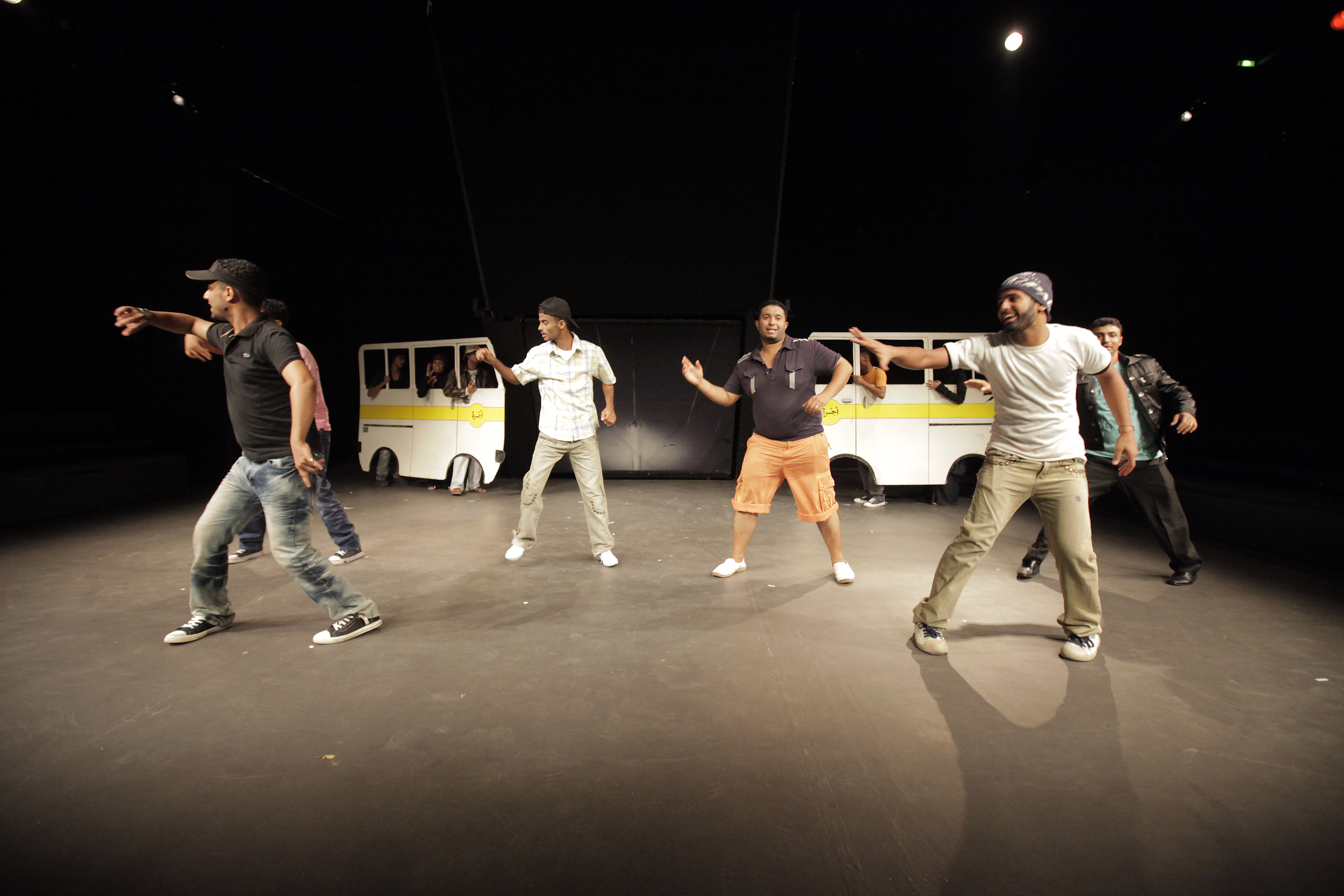
Actors from the Khaleej Aden Theater Troupe dance during a performance of Mak Nazl at Grips Theater in Berlin.

Choreography was led by Osama Bakkar, who blended traditional Yemeni dance with the expressive movements typical of musical theater. This fusion of music and dance helped convey the emotional depth of the characters and their struggles, while also entertaining audiences with dynamic performances.

== Cast and characters ==
In keeping with the original format of Linie 1, Mak Nazl featured an ensemble cast, with actors portraying multiple characters throughout the play. Some of the key cast members included:

- Fouad Huwaidi as Uncle Saber, Tariq, the Husband
- Adnan Al-Khidr as Bibo, Khadooj, Hassan
- Raed Taha as Mahmoud, Kamal, Loul, Hawa
- Qasim Rashad as Fadl the Drunk, Noori
- Gaida Gamal as Manal, Suad, Amal
- Suad Nasser / Amani Al-Dhamari as Amal
- Khaled Hamdan as Ahmed
- Huda Hassan as Ahmed's Mother

== Critical reception ==
Mak Nazl received widespread acclaim both domestically and internationally. Dr. Mubarak Salmeen, a renowned Yemeni poet and former President of the Union of Yemeni Writers and Authors in Aden, wrote in Althaqafiah (27 December 2009) that the play "touched the hearts of the audience, instilling love in their veins, which is reflected in the roots of Aden's history." Similarly, Abdul Rahman Abdo, a well-known Yemeni critic, praised the play for its cultural depth and universal relevance, calling it "a true reflection of Aden's rich cultural heritage, yet it also addresses universal human concerns".

Mak Nazl also saw success in Berlin. Alexander Eldeek of Al Hayat (18 June 2010) remarked that the play's ability to captivate international audiences while remaining deeply rooted in Yemeni culture was a testament to its power. Afrah Naser echoed this sentiment in her Yemen Today cover story (July 2010), highlighting the pride felt by both Arabs and Yemenis in the play's achievements abroad. Silke Bartlick of Deutsche Welle (19 June 2010) commended director Gamal and his team for their skillful integration of German and Yemeni cultural elements, creating a hybrid performance that appealed to audiences in both countries.
