= I Am Nojoom, Age 10 and Divorced =

2014 film

- Film poster
- Directed by: Khadija al-Salami
- Written by: Khadija al-Salami
- Starring: Reham Mohammed
- Release date: 11 December 2014 (Dubai IFF)
- Running time: 96 minutes
- Country: Yemen
- Language: Yemeni Arabic
- Box office: $108,240

I Am Nojoom, Age 10 and Divorced (Arabic: أنا نجوم بنت العاشرة ومطلقة, romanized: ‘anā Nujūm bint al-ʿāšara wa-muṭlaqa, lit. 'I am Nujūm, a girl of ten and divorced') is a 2014 Yemeni drama film directed by Khadija al-Salami. It was selected as the Yemeni entry for the Best Foreign Language Film at the 89th Academy Awards, the first time that Yemen had submitted a film for consideration. However, it was not nominated. The film is based on the story of Nujood Ali, who sought divorce from her abusive husband at age 10.

== Plot ==
Nojoom, a ten year old Yemeni girl, asks a judge in Sana'a to grant her a divorce from a horrible marriage after she was married away to prevent a public scandal following the rape of her sister.

== Cast ==
- Reham Mohammed as Nojoom
- Adnan Alkhader as Judge

== Reception ==
On the review aggregator website Rotten Tomatoes, 100% of 7 critics' reviews are positive, with an average rating of 7/10. The Hollywood Reporter gave the film a positive review, describing it as "gritty and realistic" for focusing on a child's perspective, and finding it to be overall "admirably outspoken and direct, full of authentic local color with just a touch of poetry."

== See also ==
- List of submissions to the 89th Academy Awards for Best Foreign Language Film
- List of Yemeni submissions for the Academy Award for Best Foreign Language Film
