= Hamlet in Aden =

2023 theatrical performance

Hamlet, one of William Shakespeare's most celebrated plays, was performed in "Adeni Arabic" in Aden, Yemen, in January 2023 under the name Hamlet in Aden. The production was organized by Khaleej Aden Theater Troupe and directed by Amr Gamal.

== Background ==
Aden has had a strong relationship with theater since the early 20th century. The first recorded theatrical performance in the city took place in 1905, performed by an Indian theater troupe that visited the city. This visit sparked a growing interest in theater among the local people, laying the groundwork for Aden's theatrical tradition.

In 1910, Master Hamoud Al-Hashimi, a cultural icon later known as the "King of Cinema" for his role in opening many cinemas in Aden, translated Shakespeare's Julius Caesar into Arabic. This translated play was performed by students at the Residency School in Crater, now the Military Museum, marking the first time local actors performed a play in Arabic in Aden.

== Development and support ==
The Khaleej Aden Theater Troupe, founded in 2005, has been dedicated to preserving the endangered Adeni dialect and revitalizing the local theatrical scene. Director Amr Gamal, who leads the troupe, conceived the idea to stage Hamlet in Aden after watching some filmed productions of Shakespeare's plays that were broadcast for free on YouTube by the Globe Theatre during the COVID-19 pandemic. This vision attracted the support of the British Council, which became a major sponsor of the production. The Council facilitated collaboration with the Globe Theatre in London and Volcano Theatre in Wales, providing online workshops and training sessions for the troupe over two years, led by British experts in Shakespearean theater.

=== Translation ===
Khaleej Aden Theater Troupe, under the direction of Amr Gamal, has worked to safeguard the endangered Adeni dialect of Arabic. After first translating the play in classical Arabic, Adeni poet Amr Al-Eryani translated Hamlet into the Adeni dialect. Together, they selected and incorporated rare Adeni phrases and terms, in an effort to preserve them and to further enrich the translation.

By staging Hamlet in their local dialect, Khaleej Aden Theater Troupe aimed to provide Yemeni audiences, especially the younger generation, with access to high-caliber literary theater while honoring and preserving their linguistic heritage.

== Venue and restoration ==
Khaleej aden troupe: hamlet was staged at the historic Legislative Council building, a building constructed during British colonial rule in 1871. Originally built as the Church of St. Maria, it was later transformed into the Legislative Council of Aden in 1947. The venue was chosen for its Victorian architectural style, which complemented the atmosphere of the play set in 17th century Europe.

The Legislative Council had suffered partial damage during the Battle of Aden in 2015 war, and its restoration became a key component of the Hamlet project. Khaleej Aden Theater Troupe financed simple restoration efforts using funds from the production's budget, focusing on the interior and surroundings to make the building suitable for the performance. This funding was provided to the local authority and The General Directorate of Antiquities, who supervised and executed the restoration.

One of the main goals of staging the play at the venue was to draw attention to the building's historical importance and push for its complete restoration. The play's success and widespread media coverage brought the issue to the forefront, leading UNESCO to take on the building's full restoration.

== Production ==
The troupe held ten performances of the show from 7 to 16 January 2023, all of which sold out. Each performance ran for three hours. The actors wore traditional Yemeni dress while portraying the famous scene of the actors arriving at Elsinore Castle.

=== Casting ===
The casting for Khaleej Aden Troupe: Hamlet incorporated both members of the troupe and actors from outside. Among the cast were older, experienced actors whose opportunities had been limited due to political restrictions imposed between 1994 and 2011, which severely impacted the cultural scene in Aden. These restrictions greatly reduced the number of theatrical productions and stifled the cultural development of the city. This production offered these veteran actors a chance to return to the classic works they had performed in the 1970s and 1980s.

In addition to these seasoned performers, young actors from the Hadhramaut Governorate were recruited. These actors had previously been unable to participate in major theatrical productions due to the distance of their governorate from Aden and Sanaa, where theatrical activity, though limited, is more active. One of these young actors played the role of Horatio. Director Amr Gamal encouraged him to retain his Hadhrami dialect, reasoning that since Horatio is not from Denmark, it would be logical for him to speak in a dialect different from Aden's, adding a layer of linguistic richness to the play.

The actresses were also carefully selected. One was the veteran theatrical actress Shorouk, who played the role of Gertrude, alongside two newcomers making their acting debut. Nour Zaker, playing Ophelia, told the Agence France-Presse that being an actress "was difficult because ... society does not easily accept these things", though her "family did not object". The actresses' appearance on stage without a hijab was surprising to some audience members, reflecting a shift in cultural norms over the decades. Despite facing online bullying, the actresses remained steadfast, performing without the hijab until the final show.

The production also included a number of young actors making their first stage appearances. These newcomers were selected through auditions with director Amr Gamal. Additionally, Gamal invited the Sama Aden Folk Dance Troupe to participate, portraying the visiting theater troupe at Elsinore Castle.

Casting also saw other difficulties; one actor left Yemen for France, while another died prior to the production's premiere.

The role of Hamlet was played by Ahmed Al-Yafei, who underwent extensive rehearsals with the director for five months. His performance was well received by both the audience and critics.

==== Cast list ====
- Ahmed Al-Yafei as Hamlet
- Shorook Mohammed as Gertrude
- Kassem Omar as Claudius
- Qassem Rashad as Marcellus, Gravedigger, Osric
- Amr Bassem as Laertes, member of the theater group
- Samir Seif as the ghost, the sailor, the priest
- Matlub Gharamat as Polonius
- Ahmed Yahya as Bernardo, Chief Representative, British Ambassador
- Hassan Irfan as Horatio
- Nasir Ahmed as Rosenkrantz
- Omar Mujalad as Francisco, Guildenstern
- Nour Zaker as Ophelia
- Faisal Al-Awali as Fortinbras

== Public response ==
The announcement of Hamlet performances in Aden was received with interest by the public, and tickets for the shows sold out within two days of becoming available. Audiences responded positively to the performances once they began, and Gamal explored extending the play's run.

Some online extremists discouraged attendance, saying that the troupe was involved in a conspiracy to spread Christianity, as the venue was once a church. They also suggested that the play contained Christian themes. Authorities ensured security at the legislative council to protect the audience, and the public turned out in large numbers at the legislative council, eager to attend the play.

The play ran for ten days, despite public demand for an extension. Funding secured from the British Council and local businessmen covered expenses for this limited run. Staging productions in Aden is costly due to the lack of infrastructure, leading to high rental prices for essentials like lighting, sound systems, venues, security, and cleaning staff. Moreover, a large electric generator and fuel were necessary due to Aden's severe electricity crisis over the years. These expenses exceeded ticket sales capacity, especially with economic hardships post-war. Therefore, ticket prices were kept affordable, each costing no more than a dollar and a half.

== Critical Response ==
The international press has hailed Hamlet in Aden as a remarkable cultural achievement that resonates with Yemen's struggle and resilience. Le Monde highlights director Amr Gamal's pivotal role in revitalizing the arts in southern Yemen, emphasizing the play's symbolic impact as both an artistic and cultural milestone amid conflict. Taipei Times praised the adaptation for offering a "unique cultural respite" to audiences.

Agence France-Presse, as republished in several other news platforms, wrote that the production "offers respite from war", "has resurrected hopes of a cultural revival", and "has turned a centuries-old tale into a platform to reflect on the troubled times in the country today." Al Jazeera and The Times commended the production's ambition and boldness, while L'Express celebrated its success in reconnecting Yemenis with their rich cultural heritage, showing art's enduring power in the face of adversity.
