= Aswan International Women's Film Festival =

Egyptian film festival honoring women

Aswan International Women's Film Festival AIWFF
- Location: Aswan, Egypt
- Established: 2017
- Founded by: Ministry of Culture; Ministry of Tourism; National Council for Women
- Festival date: February
- Language: International
- Website: aiwff.org

The Aswan International Women's Film Festival (AIWFF) is an annual film festival held in Aswan, Egypt. Founded in 2017 and held in February, the festival was founded by Egyptian screenwriter Mohamed Abdel Khalek. It is the first annual Egyptian film festival focused on women's issues and filmmakers, with an emphasis on Egypt and the broader MENA region.

== History ==
The festival, established in 2017 by Mohamed Abdel Khalek, is one of Egypt's premier film events. It is held under the patronage of the Egyptian ministries of Culture, Tourism, and Social Solidarity, and in association with the National Council for Women, the Aswan Governorate, and Aswan University, among others.

Abdel-Khalek described the festival as having four pillars: a showcase for films that address women's issues; a forum for women's issues convening activists from around the world; workshops for young filmmaking trainees; and a networking event for film producers.

The festival attracts a national and international audience of celebrities and politicians such as Nelly Karim, Yosra El Lozy, Madeleine Tabar, Randa El Behery, Danny Glover, Barbara Bouchet, and Victoria Abril.

Every edition honors a prominent woman. These have included: Djamila Bouhired, an Algerian militant nationalist who fought against French colonial rule, at the 2nd edition in 2018; Mohsena Tawfik, a veteran actress of Egyptian film and television, at the 3rd edition in 2019; French actress and director Marilyne Canto at the 6th edition in 2022; and Syrian actress Kinda Alloush at the 9th edition in 2025.

As of 2020, over 250 students, of which the majority were girls, have been trained at festival workshops.

== See also ==
- List of women's film festivals
