= Jaipur International Film Festival =

Indian Film festival

- Location: Jaipur, India
- Founded: 2009
- Most recent: 2026
- Hosted by: Jaipur International Film Festival Trust
- No. of films: 329 films from 67 countries
- Festival date: Opening: 8 January 2027; Closing: 12 January 2027
- Website: www.jiffindia.org

Current:19th Jaipur International Film Festival
- 18th 17th

The Jaipur International Film Festival (JIFF) is held annually in Jaipur, India, since 2009. The festival is conducted by the Jaipur International Film Festival Trust.

The Jaipur International Film Festival started in 2009 under Hanu Roj.

The 8th edition of JIFF took place from 2 January 2016 with Prakash Jha as the Chief Guest. The 10th JIFF was held on 6–10 January 2018. The 12th JIFF was held on 17–21 January 2020

The 13th Jaipur International Film Festival (JIFF) was held from 15 to 19 January 2021 in Jaipur, India.
