= Khadija al-Salami =

Yemeni filmmaker

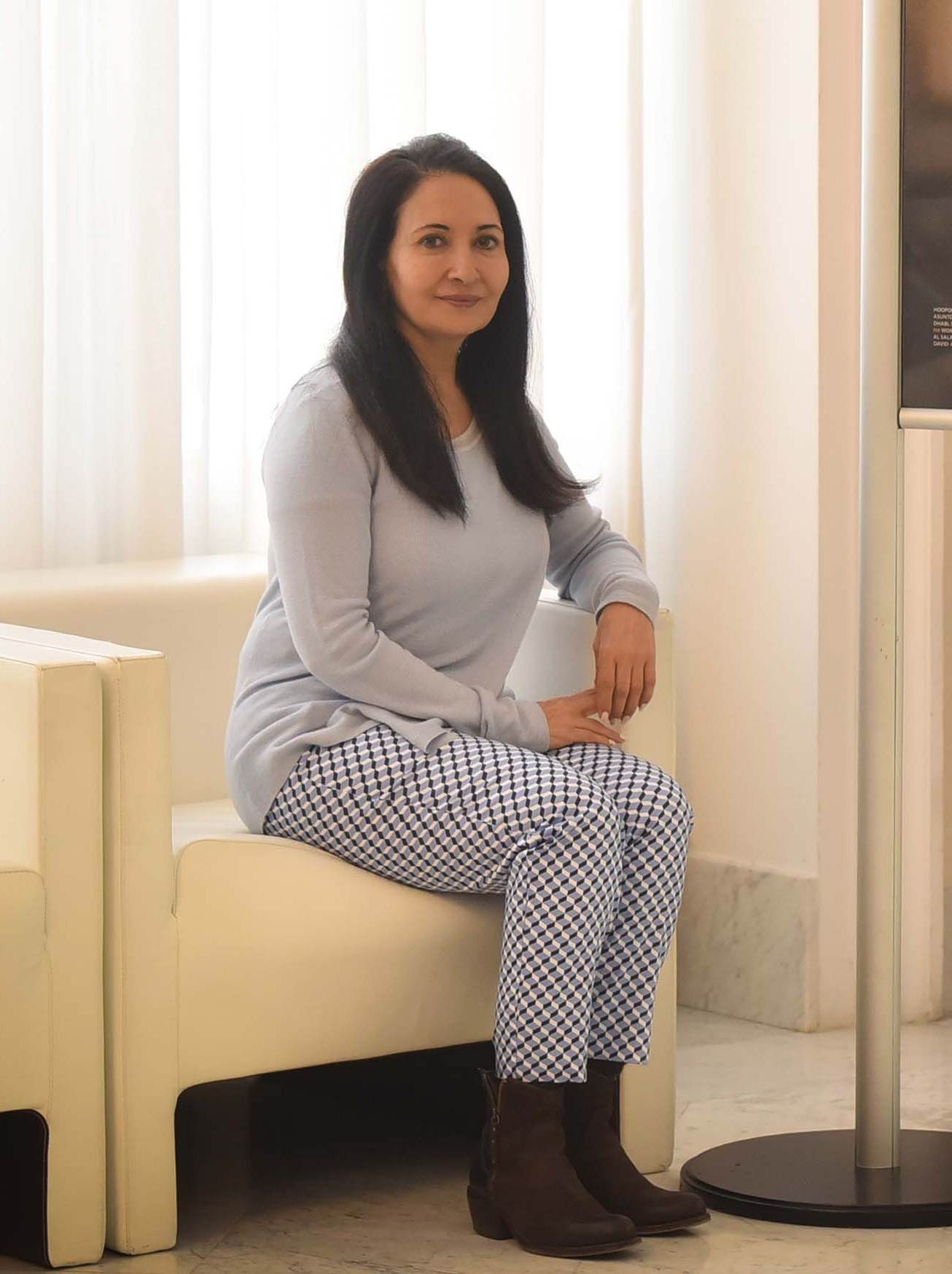
Khadija Al-Salami (2016).

Khadija al-Salami (Arabic: خديجة السلامي; born November 11, 1966) is the first Yemeni female film producer and director. Al-Salami currently resides in Paris, France. She has been nominated and also won awards at film festivals such as the Dubai International Film Festival and Vesoul Asian Film Festival. Her semi-autobiographical 2014 film, I Am Nojoom, Age 10 and Divorced was submitted to the Academy Awards, but was not selected.

== Early life and education ==
Khadija al-Salami was born on November 11, 1966 in Sanaa, Yemen. At an early age, al-Salami was sent to live with relatives after her mother divorced her father over severe domestic abuse. At age 11, she was forced by her grandmother into an early marriage and was raped by her husband. Some weeks later her husband returned her to her uncle, who immediately disowned her and returned her to her single mother. She escaped the immense family and society pressure by finding employment with the local television station and simultaneously attending school in the mornings which was her only output for happiness. At the age of 16, she received a scholarship to finish secondary school in the United States. Subsequently, she enrolled at the Mount Vernon College for Women, in Washington, D.C. After a period in Yemen and Paris, she returned to Washington to earn her Master's degree in communications at the American University. For her thesis, she produced her first film.

== Career ==
Al-Salami began her career making documentaries, whose primary foci are women, including A Stranger in her Own City (2005) about exile and how home can keep one trapped with the traditions one grew up in. She was inspired to create this film from her own experiences with arranged marriage as well as the experience of a young girl by the name of Najmia who was 13 years old at the time. She said enjoyed filming her because of her carefree spirit and of how she had reminded al-Salami at her age. Al-Salami stated that it was "never aired on Yemeni television as they were not used to such controversial subject matter". Another of her documentaries, Scream (2013) is about the roles of women during Yemen's 2011 uprising. Al-Salami has produced several documentaries for various television networks in France and Yemen.

Her 2014 film, I Am Nujood, Age 10 and Divorced, which was shot entirely in Yemen, recounts the true story of Nujood Ali, Yemen's most famous child bride, who was married off at ten and filed for divorce in court. Al-Salami did not want to tell only Nujood's story, but also her own and that of many other Yemeni child brides to allow other young girls to understand the effects of these marriages. Unlike most of her subsequent films, this one was only shot in Yemen, and she currently resides in Paris, This movie won her the best feature film at the Dubai International Film Festival and was also shown at other festivals. I Am Nojoom, Age 10 and Divorced, became the first Yemeni film to be submitted for consideration for the Academy Award for Best Foreign Language Film at the 89th Academy Awards.

She has also co-authored with her current husband, the American Charles Hoots, an autobiography, The Tears of Sheba.

Al-Salami currently serves as Press and Cultural attaché and Director of the Yemeni Information Centre at the Embassy of Yemen in Paris.

== Works ==
Year	Works
1991	Hadramaout: Crossroads of Civilizations
1994	Le pays suspendu
1995	Women of Islam
1997	Land of Sheba
2000	Yemen of a Thousand Faces
2005	A Stranger in Her Own City
2006	Amina
2013	Scream
2014	I Am Nojoom, Age 10 and Divorced
2015	La rosée du matin (French), with Nada al-Ahdal
2016	Jedenastoletnia zona (Polish), with Nada al-Ahdal

== Awards and nominations ==
Festival	Year	Award	Category and/or Film
Dubai International Film Festival	2014	Muhr Award- Winner	Best Feature Film: I am Nujood, Age 10, and Divorced (2014)
Dubai International Film Festival	2006	Muhr Award- Winner	Best Documentary- Silver: Amina (2006)
Vesoul Asian Film Festival	2006	Youth Award- Winner	Une étrangère dans sa ville (2005)
Vesoul Asian Film Festival	2005	Youth Award- Nominee	Les femmes et la démocratie au Yémen (2003)
