= Cinema of Kuwait =

- No. of screens: 61 (2010)
  - Per capita: 2.3 per 100,000 (2010)

Number of admissions (2008)
- Total: 2,200,000

Gross box office (2008)
- Total: $19.8 million

Cinema in Kuwait was introduced in the mid-20th century. The dominance of American cinema posed a problem in the formation of Arab cinema in general and of Kuwaiti cinema in particular. French film critic Guy Hennebelle argued that Arab intellectuals became convinced that only by imitating the American culture could they overcome national cultural decline and backwardness. This caused an absence of local Kuwaiti works of cinematic art. However, Kuwaitis preserved their national identity by producing local content in television. They planned a balance between preserving their national identity while also satisfying other preferences. The dependence of Kuwaiti cinema was rooted in the domination of American and other foreign-produced films.

In 1971, Khalid Alsidiqq directed the first Kuwaiti feature film that talked about local cultural heritage and history. The Kuwaiti cinema industry now employs a strong usage of local culture and tradition. In 1972, Kuwait produced their first feature film Bas ya Bahr (The Cruel Sea) which talks about common life in the pre-oil discovery period when fishing was a predominant occupation. This initiated the local film industry to be one of the most famous and acknowledged feature film of the era. Later in 1976, Kuwait produced its second feature film The Wedding of Zain.

There are female actresses who had a prominent role in shaping local cinema such as Souad Abdullah and Hayat Al Fahad, long considered an iconic Kuwaiti actress who had a prominent role in shaping local cinema to the present day.

In 1954, the Kuwait National Cinema Company was established. Being the first leading entertainment company in Kuwait and in the Gulf, in 2005 it released its Cinematic brand and theatre in the country, Cinescape. Kuwait was the first country in the Middle East and the second worldwide after Australia to ease M-NET payment, improving audience experiences in the cinema.

== History ==
Cinema in Kuwait was affected by the dominance of Hollywood on the cinematic world as most of the portrayed films were American made. It was dominated with Western movies, while the local television channels was dominated widely with Kuwaiti made movies and television series. Most of its portrayed films were in foreign languages imported from other countries. There is a clear dominance of Hollywood movies in Kuwaiti theaters. On average, the percentage of American movies are 80 percent, while other movie content produced by countries such as Egypt, India and Britain never exceeded 38 percent of the movies premiered. In a period of eight weeks only once a Kuwaiti made movie was shown in the cinemas. This is due to the fact that Kuwait is a rather small country that is saturated with expatriates. The domination of American film and other foreign produced films has the Kuwaiti cinema imitate and depend on it for so long. It was in 1971 that the young talent of Khalid Alsidiqqi that emerged and directed the first Kuwaiti feature film that talks about its cultural heritage and history.

Kuwait began producing their own television content in 1961, which was early comparing to other countries in the region, thus it instantly gained popularity and admiration from surrounding gulf countries. This drove them forward to launch their own satellite. KTV 1 is one of the oldest television broadcast channels established in Kuwait. The Kuwaiti satellite was able to cover the gulf and reach further regions such as North America, which was difficult to accomplish at that time period in 1997. They had a vision which was “to spread Kuwaiti produced news, information, and cultural programming all around the globe.” (P.434). they wanted to share their culture and convey it to other nationalities. Kuwait was and still named ‘عروسة الخليج’ which translated to The Bride of The Gulf, this nickname was initiated by the Gulf countries to Kuwait for its history in films and music, etc. Kuwait is the birthplace of film in the Gulf, it was not until the release of Bas ya Bahr that it was recognized and known by Khalejis for its films and their artistry in showing the cultural and heritage of the Kuwaiti citizens and the Khaleji community in general.

=== Bas ya Bahr (1972) ===
Bas ya Bahr (en: Enough of the sea) is a film produced in Kuwait, directed by Khalid Alsiddiq. It is significant because it is Kuwait's first feature film. Actors who had a prominent role in the movie were Mohammed Al-Mansour, Amal Bakr, Saad Al-Faraj and Hayat El-Fahad. The film was in black and white and its duration was an hour and 41 minutes. Before the drastic changes that took place in Kuwait due to the discovery of oil, pearl diving was one of the main income sources people had. The events happen to a typical Kuwaiti family, a young man seeks to marry the girl he loves (“Nura”) however many obstacles come in his way. The first issue is that he does not have enough money to propose thus her father stands in their way. He wants to marry off his daughter to someone with a decent amount of money in possession. “Moussaed” insisting on his decision to pearl dive finds his father also preventing him from diving, fearful of the many dangers in the sea that his son could come across. Eventually his father allows him to pursue what he wants. Moussaed excessively trying hard to obtain the pearls lead to his death. In his final dive, he found a huge pearl that was taken to his family as a gesture of his braveness and determination. His mother then goes to sea with grief and sorrow in her heart and yells “Bas ya Bahr” which translates in to “enough of the sea”. It was the first Kuwait produced film that reached the 45th Academy Awards as Best Foreign Language film, however, it was not nominated.

==== Urs AL-Zayn The Wedding of Zein (1976) ====
It is the second feature film to be produced in Kuwait, it was directed by the famous Kuwaiti director Khalid Alsiddiq. This film was based on a novel of the same name Urs Al-Zaynor The Wedding of Zein by Al-Tayyib Saleh. The film cast who were prominent in the film are Ali Mahdi as Zein, Ibrahim Hujazi as Haneen and Tahiya Zaroug as Nama. The film duration was 90 minutes and it was their first color film to be produced in Kuwait. The film talks about Zein who is perceived as an amiable buffoon clown by the village people, as his declaration for loving the village maidens brings nothing but laughs to the village. But to Haneen, a Muslim holy man, he has genuine pity and peace for Zein. As well as the young beautiful girl in the village who sees the most in Zein than other villagers.

In 1978, Kuwait submitted the film to the 51st Academy Awards as representative for Best Foreign Language film category, but it did not get nominated and Kuwait has not submitted another film since.

=== Drive-in Cinema ===
Kuwait pioneered in delivering a different and unique cinema experience in the Gulf region, they built a couple of drive-in cinemas. The only country in the Gulf region with that kind of cinema. Families, friends and even individuals could stop by and watch a movie while sitting comfortably in their cars. The major drive-in cinema was set up on the Sixth ring road, others were scattered in the city. However, in modern days these cinemas are either replaced with a more contemporary building or demolished.

=== Accolades ===
Falafel Cart, released in 2019 by director Abdullah Al-Wazzan became Kuwait's first film to be officially selected at the prestigious Hiroshima International Animation Festival in Japan where it received a "Best of the World" honorable mention. In 2021 the film won best animated short film at the Burbank International Film Festival in California, United States. In 2019, Falafel Cart was submitted for the 92nd Academy Awards in the short animated film category, making it Kuwait's first short film to ever be submitted to the Academy Awards.

== Role of women ==
=== Hayat Al Fahad ===
Hayat Al Fahad was born on April 18, 1948. She is an actress, broadcaster, writer and producer. Al Fahad is one of the prominent artist in Kuwait and the Gulf region as a whole. Hayat Al Fahad moved from her city on the age of fifteen year-old and lost her father in the same year as well as stopped her education journey at that age. However, she self-taught herself and managed to teach herself how read and write in both Arabic and English. Al Fahad started her journey in the art world when a famous artist visited the hospital she works in and offered her a role. It was not long until she appeared on her first television show Bojassom Familyin 1964 and continues ever since until she gain her independence and class in the cinematic industry of Kuwait and the Gulf region as a whole. One of her most known works are Bas Ya Bahr (1972), My Aunt Qumasha (1983), Ruqaia and Sabecha, (1986), جرح الزمن The Wound of Time (2001) which were Kuwaiti produced television shows, and عندما تغني الزهور When The Flowers Sing (2005) which was a Qatari produced television show. Aside from being an actress, Hayat Al Fahad has written several dramas and films in her career that were broadcast and had their own success, دمعة يتيمThe orphan tear, الأخت صالحة The Sister Saleha’,and الحريمwhich is The Ladies.

=== Souad Abdullah ===
Souad Abdullah is a Kuwaiti actress. She was born in Basra, Iraq, on September 2, 1950. After the death of her father, her mother married a Kuwaiti businessman and they both left for Kuwait. Abdullah then married a Kuwaiti director, Faisal Al Dahi, and gained Kuwaiti citizenship. Abdullah is considered one of the most iconic actresses in the history of Kuwaiti cinema. She started her journey in acting in 1963 with the late artist Mohammad El Nashmi in a TV series called Television’s Majlis ديوانية التلفزين, then she started doing theatre in 1964 with the Kuwaiti Theatre band فرقة المسرح الكويتي with the play Her Luck Breaks Rocks حظها يكسر الصخر directed and produced by Mohammad El Nashmi in 1965. Souad Abdullah is the first Khaleji artist to host talk and competition shows where she hosted Ramadan talk shows as she co-starred with the late artist Abdulhussain Abdulredha. Throughout her acting history, Abdullah left a trail of artistry to the Kuwaiti and Khaleji audience. Moreover, she co-starred in television soap operas alongside Hayat Al Fahad and Abdulhussain Abdulredha. She joined Abdulredha in several shows such as Private Lesson درس خصوصي and Salmia’s Bachelor عزوبي السالمية. Also, she co-starred with Al Fahad in one of that era's successful soap operas, Ruqaia and Sbeeka (1986), My Aunt Qumasha (1983) and Went and did not come back (1982). In addition, in the 90s Abdullah started doing TV soap operas and melodramas and she continues until now. Souad Abdullah was named the Cinderella of the Khaleji cinema and the Pearl of creativity. She gained such names due to her talent and artistry in acting and shaping Kuwaiti and Khaleji cinematic history.

== Kuwait National Cinema Company ==
Kuwait National Cinema Company (KNCC) was established in 1954. It is the leading entertainment in Kuwait and in the entire region as well. Ownership and operation of cinema theaters as well as providing large printing services and through its main branches it provide real estate investments, producing and distribution of movies. In 1966, KNCC used shopping centers as prime locations for screen theaters and began to modernize older theaters to enhance its image. In addition, KNCC introduced the first E-Ticketing service in 2003 where customers are able to purchase and book their ticketing online using debit and credit cards. Moreover, in 2005 KNCC increased its support to modernize cinema sectors by introducing the M-NET payment method. This is a payment method to ease the purchasing process for customers where they can pay for their ticket using their mobile phone. As a result, Kuwait became the second country in the world to ease and enable mobile phone payments after Australia.

=== Cinescape ===
In 2005, Kuwait National Cinema Company introduced its new brand, Cinescape. Its initial release goal is to provide the customers a superior viewing experience. This concept was rolled throughout all KNCC locations with their main targeted audience being the youth of Kuwait. Its main features include Dolby Cinema (improvements in sound), 4DX (motion chairs, environmental effects such as wind, bubbles and scent), ScreenX (multi-projection platform with a 270 degree viewing experience), IMAX theatre (aural and visual improvements), ELEVEN (improvements in sound system and picture performance by utilizing Barca laser projection).

== Regulations ==
In Kuwait, the Ministry of Information is responsible for regulating movies. The ministry can cut scenes they consider inappropriate. Films connected to politics, sexuality, religion, or extreme violence can be censored.

== Films shot in Kuwait ==
- Bas Ya Bahar (Kuwaiti movie; 1972)
- The Silence - الصمت (Kuwaiti movie; 1976)
- The Wedding of Zein (Kuwaiti movie; 1976)
- Ahmad Al Sane's Life (African documentary; 1976)
- The Message (international movie; 1976)
- Baraka (American documentary; 1982)
- The Trap - الفخ (Kuwaiti movie; 1983)
- Les Anges (Tunisian; 1984)
- Lektionen in Finsternis (German short documentary; 1992)
- Fires of Kuwait (American short documentary; 1992)
- Kallu Kondoru Pennu (Malayalam movie; 1998)
- The Youngest Son (Kuwaiti movie; 2001)
- Sedra (short Kuwaiti movie; 2001)
- Shabab Cool (Kuwaiti movie; 2002)
- VeTool (Documentary; 2004)
- Desert Sky (American documentary; 2005)
- Losing Ahmad (Documentary; 2006)
- 365 Boots on Ground (American documentary; 2005)
- Cute (Kuwaiti movie; 2008)
- The Sniper (Kuwaiti movie; 2008)
- Amreeka (American movie; 2009)
- Al Denjewana (Kuwaiti movie; 2009)
- Kahin Na Kahin Milenge (Indian movie; 2009)
- Mustache (Kuwaiti movie; 2010)
- Whispers of Sin (Kuwaiti movie; 2010)
- Heaven's Water (Kuwaiti movie; 2010)
- The Waves Will Carry Us (Kuwaiti movie; 2011)
- Tora Bora (Kuwaiti movie; 2011)
- Sneeze (Kuwaiti movie; 2011)
- The Detective (Kuwaiti movie; 2011)
- Saloon (Kuwaiti movie; 2012)
- Vanish (Kuwaiti movie; 2012)
- Someone (a.k.a. Fulan) (Kuwaiti movie; 2012)
- Al Salhiyah (Kuwaiti movie; 2012)
- Vanish (Kuwaiti movie; 2012)
- Sera al-Ahibbah (Kuwaiti movie; 2013)
- Dinosaur (Kuwaiti movie; 2013)
- The Carpet (a.k.a. Al Zooliyyah) (Kuwaiti movie; 2014)
- Playtime (Kuwaiti movie; 2013)
- Sinaryu (Kuwaiti movie; 2013)
- 090 (Kuwaiti movie; 2014)
- Kan Refeeji (Kuwaiti movie; 2014)
- Cut: Unforgettable Night (Kuwaiti movie; 2014)
- Alisa Khatafha Jamil (Kuwaiti movie; 2014)
- Between Love and Marriage (Indian movie; 2015)
- Victor (Kuwaiti movie; 2015)
- Habeb Alarth (Kuwaiti movie; 2015)
- When You Free Your Residents (Kuwaiti movie; 2015)
- Burning Wells (Indian movie; 2018)
- Falafel Cart (Short Film; 2019)

== Kuwaiti directors ==
- Khalid Al Siddiq
- Mohamed Al-Sanousi
- Ahmad Alkhalaf
- Sadeq Behbehani
- Zeyad Al-Husaini
- Abdullah Boushahri
- Walid Al-Awadi
- Farah ALHashem
- Tareq Al-Zamel
- Haya Alghanim
- Abdullah Al-Wazzan

== See also ==
- Arab cinema
- Cinema of the Middle East
- Cinema of the world
- Cinema of West Asia
