= List of Kuwaiti films =

An A-Z list of films produced in Kuwait:

== 0-9 ==
- 090 (فلم) - 2014

== A ==
- Abo oyoun - 2018
- Alisa Khatafha Jamil - 2014
- Les Anges - 1984

== B ==
- The Cruel Sea (Bas ya Bahar) - 1971

== D ==
- Dreams Without Sleep - 2002

== F ==
- Falafel Cart - 2019

== H ==
- History of Fear - 2014

== J ==
- Just Like You Imagined - 2003

== L ==
- Losing Ahmad - 2006

== M ==
- The Message - 1976

== N ==
- The Narrow Frame of Midnight - 2014

== S ==
- Second Blood - 2016
- Second Blood 2: Back in the Army - 2018
- Songs of Freedom and Exile - 2014
- Storm from the South - 2006

== T ==
- Theeb - 2014

== V ==
- The Valley - 2014

== W ==
- The Wedding of Zein - 1976
- Whispers of Sin - 2010

== Y ==
- Les Yeux du golfe - 1984)
