= List of Kuwaiti submissions for the Academy Award for Best International Feature Film =

Best International Feature Film submissions from Kuwait

Highlights
- Debut: 1972
- Submissions: 2
- Nominations: none
- Oscar winners: none

Kuwait has submitted films for the Academy Award for Best International Feature Film category since 1972. (Note: The category was previously named the Academy Award for Best Foreign Language Film, but this was changed to the Academy Award for Best International Feature Film in April 2019, after the Academy deemed the word "Foreign" to be outdated.) The award is handed out annually by the United States Academy of Motion Picture Arts and Sciences to a feature-length motion picture produced outside the United States that contains primarily non-English dialogue.

As of 2026, Kuwait has submitted only two films, but neither of them were nominated. Its last submission was made in 1978.

== Submissions ==
The Academy of Motion Picture Arts and Sciences has invited the film industries of various countries to submit their best film for the Academy Award for Best International Feature Film since 1956. The International Feature Film Committee oversees the process and reviews all the submitted films. Following this, they vote via secret ballot to determine the five nominees for the award.

Below is a list of the films that have been submitted by Kuwait for review by the academy for the award by year and the respective Academy Awards ceremony.

Year (Ceremony)	Film title used in nomination	Original title	Language	Director	Result
1972 (45th)	The Cruel Sea	بس يابحر	Arabic	Khalid Al Siddiq	Not nominated
1978 (51st)	The Wedding of Zein	عرس الزين	Arabic	Khalid Al Siddiq	Not nominated

== See also ==
- List of Academy Award winners and nominees for Best International Feature Film
- List of Academy Award-winning foreign language films
- Cinema of Kuwait
