= Stanley (1999 film) =

- Directed by: Suzie Templeton
- Written by: Suzie Templeton
- Edited by: Tony Fish; Suzie Templeton
- Music by: Jonny Templeton; Sam Butterfield
- Release date: 1999
- Running time: 7 minutes
- Country: United Kingdom
- Language: No dialogue

Stanley is a 1999 award-winning stop motion animated short film written, directed and animated by Suzie Templeton. It was made at the Surrey Institute of Art & Design, University College, now the University for the Creative Arts in England.

== Synopsis ==
While his frustrated wife wreaks violence and death in the kitchen, Stanley finds love in a giant cabbage he is growing in his back yard.

== Awards ==
- Best College Student Animation: 2000 Nashville Independent Film Festival, USA
- Luna de Bronce: 2000 International Film Festival Cinema Jove, Spain
- Grand Prize: 2000 Dervio International Cartoons and Comics Festival, Italy
- Prizewinner – Student Film Showcase: 2000 Hamptons International Film Festival, USA
- Best Student Animation: 2000 Fort Lauderdale International Film Festival, USA
- Jury Prize: 2000 International Short Film Festival 'Der Eisenstein', Germany
- Best Student Animation: 2000 FAN International Short Film and Animation Festival, UK
- Best Animation: 2000 Interfilm Berlin Short Film Festival, Berlin, Germany
- Doug Wandrei Award for Best Lighting Design, 2001 Ann Arbor Film Festival, USA
- Golden Sun Award – Best of the Festival: 2001 California SUN International Animation Festival, USA
- Best Animation: 2001 Bare Bones International Independent Film Festival, USA
- Best Short Animation: 2002 Fantasy Film Festival, Malaga, Spain
