= Breakfast in Beirut =

- Directed by: Farah ALHashem
- Written by: Farah ALHashem, Awatif Zaine
- Produced by: Farah ALHashem
- Production company: VioletSkye Films
- Release date: August 2015
- Running time: 72 minutes
- Country: United States
- Language: Arabic

Breakfast in Beirut is a 2015 documentary film by VioletSkye Films. It was written, directed, and produced by Farah ALHashem.

== Background ==
ALHashem is a Lebanese-Kuwaiti filmmaker who has made seven short films since 2011 including 7 Hours, which won several awards at film festivals in 2013. She has a degree in journalism from Lebanese American University and a MFA degree from New York Film Academy.

In 2014, the official Avant Premiere of Breakfast in Beirut was held at the Metropolis Sofil Theater in Beirut while the official international premiere in Paris at Le Brady Cinema in April 2016. Breakfast in Beirut received an honorary recognition by the municipality of Treviso, Italy and in collaboration with the Gallery "Made In" Venice, Italy as they decided to name their art festival “Breakfast in Beirut Art Festival” in honor the film and ALHashem.

The cast features Farah ALHashem, Zeina Makki, Layal Badaro, Badih Abou Chakra, Natasha Choufani, Abdelrahim Awji, and Mahmoud Hojej. Awatif Zaine served as the Production Supervisor.

== Plot ==
This film focuses on a Kuwaiti student along with her Lebanese friends. The interviewees share their intimate tales of Beirut mixed with the fictional story of a group of people and the memories of their life in Beirut while expressing their discontent and, at the same time, revealing a deep connection with the city. Breakfast in Beirut is a series of tales from an inspired life story about a young woman who lost her soul mate. Even though Beirut in 2005 - 2009’s political crisis was a never ending crisis, this young woman found Beirut to be the land of dreams and the safest place on earth for her eternal love to him.

== Festivals and awards ==
=== Festivals ===
- Official Selection - Alexandria Film Festival For Mediterranean Countries (Egypt 2015)
- Official Selection - Lebanese Film Festival (Sydney, Australia 2015)
- Official Selection - Lumiere International Film Festival (Rome, Italy 2016)
- Official Selection - CultFest (Mastre, Italy 2016)
- Official Selection - Okaz Cultural Art Festival (2016)

=== Awards and honors ===
- Honorable Award - Ministry of Culture (Beirut 2014)
- Special Mention - Jury of Nour Sherif section for Feature Length films at Alexandria Film Festival For Mediterranean Countries (Egypt 2015)
- Top 5 Films that represent Beirut - LAHA Magazine (2015)
- Nominated "Film of the Year" - Lebanese Film Festival (Sydney, Australia 2015)
- Breakfast in Beirut Art Festival in Venice - Curated by Made in Gallery and Municipality of Treviso as an honorable tribute to Breakfast in Beirut (2016)
