= Dog (2001 film) =

- Directed by: Suzie Templeton
- Written by: Suzie Templeton
- Edited by: Tony Fish
- Release date: 2001
- Running time: 5 minutes 40 seconds
- Country: United Kingdom
- Language: English

Dog is a stop motion animated short film written, directed and animated by Suzie Templeton. The film was made at the Royal College of Art in 2001.

== Premise ==
A young boy and his father live in a dull, lonely house with the shadow of mourning hanging over them both. The boy misses his mother and longs for reassurance about how his mother died but gets no comfort from his father's ascertains that she went peacefully. To protect each other, he and his father hold their agony inside, where it festers. This tragedy is added to by the family dog which is looking increasingly unhealthy.

== Awards ==
- McLaren Award for New British Animation: 2001 Edinburgh International Film Festival, Scotland
- National Film Board of Canada Grand Prize (Student Competition Year): 2001 Ottawa International Animation Festival, Canada
- Cinewomen Award for Best Female Director: 2001 FAN International Short Film and Animation Festival, UK
- Best Animation: 2001 Royal Television Society London Centre Student Television Awards, UK
- BAFTA - Short Animation Film: 2002 British Academy of Film and Television Arts, UK
- Paul Berry Award for Best Student Film: 2002 British Animation Awards, UK
- Best Experimental Animation: 2002 California SUN International Animation Festival, USA
- Best Animation: 2002 Royal Television Society National Student Television Awards, UK
- Best Animation: 2002 Brooklyn International Film Festival, USA
- Grand Prix: 2002 Dervio International Cartoons and Comics Festival, Italy
- Best Overall Film: 2002 Melbourne International Animation Festival, Australia
- Best Student Animation: 2002 Palm Springs International Festival of Short Films, USA
- Special Mention: 2002 Regensburg Short Film Week, Germany
- Bronze Award: 2002 WorldFest-Houston International Film Festival, USA
- Hiroshima Prize: 2002 Hiroshima International Animation Festival, Japan
- Winner of Professional Category: 2002 D&AD/Campaign Screen New Directors Competition, England
- Anyzone Award: 2002 Holland Animation Film Festival, The Netherlands
- Grand Prix - Narrative Film: 2002 Holland Animation Film Festival, The Netherlands
- Grand Prix: 2002 Siena International Short Film Festival, Italy
- Best Story: 2002 Black Nights Film Festival, Tallinn, Estonia
- Best Animation: 2003 Tampere Film Festival, Finland
