= Hiroshima International Animation Festival =

Biennial film festival held in Japan

International Animation Festival Hiroshima
- Location: Hiroshima, Japan
- Founded: 1985
- Language: Japanese

The International Animation Festival Hiroshima, founded as International Animation Festival for the World Peace in 1985, was a biennial film festival for animated films held in Hiroshima, Japan. Its last edition was held in 2020.

== History ==
The festival was founded in 1985 by the Association International du Film d'Animation (ASIFA) as the International Animation Festival for the World Peace. The city of Hiroshima was one of the sites of nuclear bombings in 1945 at the end of World War II, and it was chosen to inspire thoughts of unity through the arts. The festival was considered one of the most respected animated film festival, along with Annecy International Animated Film Festival, Ottawa International Animation Festival, and Zagreb World Festival of Animated Films. The founding of the festival is largely credited to Sayoko Kinoshita and her late husband Renzo Kinoshita. The married couple were renowned figures in the independent animation world and also founders of ASIFA's Japan chapter.

The first two festivals were held in odd years: 1985 and 1987. Since 1990, the festival has been held biennially in even years. In 2008, the 12th Festival took place for five days (August 7–11).

In the festival's first year in 1985, the Grand Prize was awarded to Broken Down Film by Osamu Tezuka. Tezuka became one of the members of the jury for the following festival. This cycle has often repeated and many of the grand prize winners have become judges for the following festival.

In 2010, the Festival had nearly 1,937 entries from 58 countries and regions, and had more than 34,516 participants.

In November 2020, the city of Hiroshima announced ending its partnership with ASIFA, and plans to replace the festival.

The city subsequently launched a successor event, Hiroshima Animation Season (HAS), positioned as the animation component of the newly established Hiroshima Festival and accredited as an Oscar-qualifying festival for the Animated Short Film category. The first edition, Hiroshima Animation Season 2022, was held from 17 to 21 August 2022, received 2,149 entries from 86 countries and regions, and awarded its Grand Prize to Darwin's Notebook by Georges Schwizgebel. The second edition, Hiroshima Animation Season 2024, was held from 14 to 18 August 2024, received 2,634 entries from 97 countries and regions, and awarded its Grand Prize to Beautiful Men by Nicolas Keppens; Kōji Yamamura served as the festival's Artistic Director, with the selection committee also including Co-producer Shizuka Miyazaki and animation artist Honami Yano. A third edition is scheduled for August 2026.

== Description ==
The city of Hiroshima co-hosts the festival, which takes place in JMS Aster Plaza near the Hiroshima Peace Memorial Park at the center of Hiroshima city.

Sayoko Kinoshita has been the festival director since the first festival and is now also the president of ASIFA.

== Grand Prize winners ==
Year	English title	Director(s)	Country
1985	Broken Down Film	Osamu Tezuka	Japan
1987	The Man Who Planted Trees	Frédéric Back	Canada
1990	The Cow	Aleksandr Petrov	Soviet Union
1992	The Sandman	Paul Berry	United Kingdom
1994	The Mighty River	Frédéric Back	Canada
1996	Repete	Michaela Pavlátová	Czech Republic
1998	The Old Lady and the Pigeons	Sylvain Chomet	France
2000	When the Day Breaks	Wendy Tilby and Amanda Forbis	Canada
2002	Father and Daughter	Michaël Dudok de Wit	Netherlands
2004	Mt. Head	Kōji Yamamura	Japan
2006	Milch	Igor Kovalyov	United States
2008	A Country Doctor	Kōji Yamamura	Japan
2010	Angry Man	Anita Killi	Norway
2012	I Saw Mice Burying a Cat	Dmitry Geller	Russia
2014	The Bigger Picture	Daisy Jacobs	United Kingdom
2016	The Empty	Jeong Dahee	South Korea
2018	The Blissful Accidental Death	Sergiu Negulici	Romania
2020	Daughter	Daria Kashcheeva	Russia Czech Republic

== Notable Hiroshima Prize winners ==
- 1985 - The Big Snit - Richard Condie (Canada)
- 1987 - The Dreamless Sleep - David Anderson (U.K.)
- 1990 - The Hill Farm - Mark Baker (U.K.)
- 1992 - Cat and Company - Alexander Guryev (Russia)
- 1994 - The Village - Mark Baker (U.K.)
- 1996 - The Monk and the Fish - Michael Dudok de Wit (France)
- 1998 - The Mermaid - Alexander Petrov (Russia)
- 2000 - One Day a Man Bought a House - Pjotr Sapegin (Norway)
- 2002 - Dog - Suzie Templeton (U.K.)
- 2004 - Louise - Anita Lebeau (Canada)
- 2006 - Wolf Daddy - Chang Hyung yun (Republic of Korea)
- 2008 - La Maison en Petits Cubes - Kunio Kato (Japan)
- 2010 - Divers In The Rain - Priit Parn, Olga Parn (Estonia)
- 2012 - Kali the Little Vampire - Regina Pessoa (Portugal/France/Canada/Switzerland)
- 2014 - Symphony No.42 - Réka Bucsi (Hungary)
- 2016 - Among the black waves - Anna Budanova (Russia)
- 2018 - Bond - Judit Wunder (Hungary)
- 2020 - Am I a Wolf? - Amir Houshang Moein (Iran)

== Best of the World (Honorable Mention) ==
- 2020 - Ah - Ying-Fang Shen (Taiwan)
- 2020 - CASTLE - Ryotaro Miyajima (Japan)
- 2020 - Falafel Cart - Abdullah Al-Wazzan (Kuwait)
- 2020 - don’t know what - Thomas Renoldner (Austria)
- 2020 - After the eclipse - Bea R Blankenhorst (Argentina)

== See also ==
- List of international animation festivals
- Academy Award for Best Animated Short Film
