= Suzie Templeton =

British film animator

- Born: 8 February 1967 (age 59); Hampshire, England
- Occupations: Writer, director, animator
- Website: suzietempleton.com

Suzanah Clare Templeton (born 1967 in Hampshire, England) is a British animator. Her film Peter and the Wolf has won several awards, including the Academy Award for Best Animated Short Film in 2008.

== Personal life ==
=== Early life ===
Raised at Highfield in Southampton, she began work as an animator as a child with her older brother. The two children created special effects for her brother's home films. Having only a slight interest in animation as a child, Suzie graduated with a degree in the sciences from University College London. She spent many years travelling the world and doing odd jobs. However, believing not to be skilled enough in science, she switched to the humanities and began work as an English teacher at an Indian woman's shelter and orphanage in her mid-twenties. Templeton was given an image of Nick Park's Wallace and Gromit by her mother, which inspired her to begin work with sculpture, models, and puppets for stop motion animation.

=== Later life ===
As of 2014, Templeton was mentoring other creators at the 2014 Animateka film festival. Her husband, the Dutch filmmaker and musician Rosto, died five years later in 2019 after a year-long battle with cancer. The pair also have a son and daughter together. Max and Rosie Templeton

== Career ==
Templeton began her professional career in animation after attempting enrolment at the Surrey Institute of Art and Design (now known as the University for the Creative Arts in Farnham) at the age of 28. After finishing with a BA in animation there, she moved on to the Royal College of Art (RCA), graduating in 2001. Templeton was attracted to the model making and creative process of stop motion due to the solitary and slow process of the medium. At the RCA, she was able to craft her abilities in three dimensional work and story telling. Not only did she build on her technical abilities, but she also found her own voice and tone in the medium. She began with the impression that she'd work on cartoons (such as Wallace and Gromit) to appeal to commercial interests for jobs and work. However, her films have taken a dark and difficult approach. Animation had become an outlet for her darker emotions, rather than appealing to the masses.

Templeton completed two projects at RCA, her first short film Stanley (1999) and her graduate project Dog (2001) both winning numerous awards. After graduating from RCA, Templeton began work on a modern interpretation of Sergei Prokofiev's Peter and the Wolf. Templeton was approached by film maker and producer Hugh Welchman and conductor Mark Stephenson asking her to create an animated sequence to be played during a live orchestral performance. She began work on the film alone in her own home.

After understanding how large of a piece the film actually was, she moved to a Polish studio. The production of the film took over two hundred people and over five years to complete. The film was released in 2006 and is the winner of multiple awards, including the Academy Award for Best Short Film in 2008.

In October 2008 Templeton has joined the roster of animation directors at Tandem Films. She mentioned that her next project may be another short film based on Lauren Child's children's book The Pesky Rat. By the same year she was also working on plans for a feature film, but for the following decade never disclosed any information regarding the subject or producer.

In 2020, the silence was finally broken with news of plans for a feature called Spitsbergen and a medium-length piece entitled Return to Nix. Parisian arthouse company Autour de minuit was said to be on board to produce both projects.

== Filmography ==
- Stanley (1999)
- Dog (2001)
- Peter and the Wolf (2006)

== Awards ==
- Stanley (1999) is the winner of the 2001 Golden Sun Award, the 2000 Best College Student Animation Award of the Nashville Independent Film Festival, the 2000 Best Animation Award for the International Short Film Festival of Berlin, and many others.
- Dog (2001) is the winner of the 2002 British Academy of Film and Television Arts (BAFTA) in Short Animation and many others. It also won the Hiroshima Prize at the 2002 Hiroshima International Animation Festival.
- Peter and the Wolf (2006) is the winner of the 2008 Academy Award for Best Short Film, the 2006 British Animation Award for Best TV Special, the 2007 Pulcinella Ward for Best European Programme, the 2007 Grand Prix and Audience Award Annecy at the French Animation Festival, the 2007 Golden Rose for Performing Arts at the Rose D'or Festival in Switzerland, the 2007 Special Prize at the Ukraine Animated Film Festival, and the 2008 Special Jury Award of the Lucca Animation Festival in Italy.
