= Cinema of the Middle East =

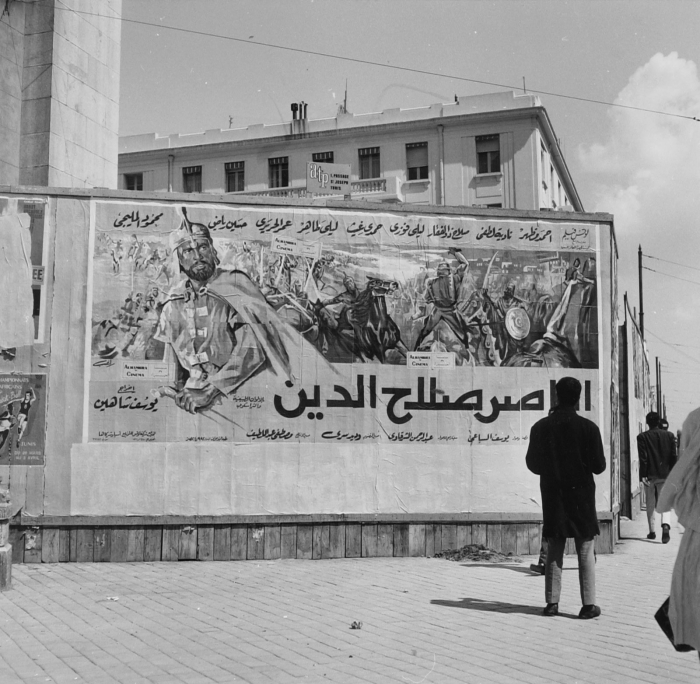
Cinematic street poster in Tunis, Tunisia for the Egyptian film Saladin the Victorious (1963) directed by Youssef Chahine starring Ahmed Mazhar, Salah Zulfikar, Nadia Lutfi and others.

Middle Eastern cinema collectively refers to the film industries of West Asia and part of North Africa. By definition, it encompasses the film industries of Egypt, Iran, Bahrain, Iraq, Israel, Jordan, Kuwait, Lebanon, Palestine, Oman, Qatar, Saudi Arabia, Syria, United Arab Emirates, and Yemen. As such, the film industries of these countries are also part of the cinema of Asia, or in the case of Egypt, Africa.

Since the inception of cinema in Europe and the United States, many people assumed that cinema in the Middle East arrived much later than Western Cinema. However, it was found that cinema was brought into most of the Arab countries by the beginning of the 20th century, particularly in Egypt in 1896, by Pathé Frères or the Lumière Brothers. Eventually since the 1950s Egyptian cinema was and still is the main dominating Arab and Middle Eastern film industry and this led to many other Middle Eastern countries incorporating Egyptian conventions into their own films.

Each Middle Eastern country has a different and distinctive culture of cinema which differs in both history and infrastructure. The historical component includes key events and trigger points which led to the inception or emergence of cinema in the Middle East. The infrastructural component defines the current institution and/or systems in place which facilitate the financing/development/exhibition of cinema, locally or internationally.

== Arab countries ==
=== Bahrain ===
The first cinema to be established in Bahrain consisted of a makeshift cinema set up in a cottage in 1922, with the first official cinema set up in 1937. Several more were established in the 1950s and 1960s, and the Bahrain Cinema and Film Distribution Company began operating in 1967, which was renamed the Bahrain Cinema Company in 1976. There are now a number of modern-style cinemas in Bahrain, including the 20-screen complex in Bahrain City Centre. (See Cinema of Bahrain).

=== Egypt ===
==== History of the industry ====
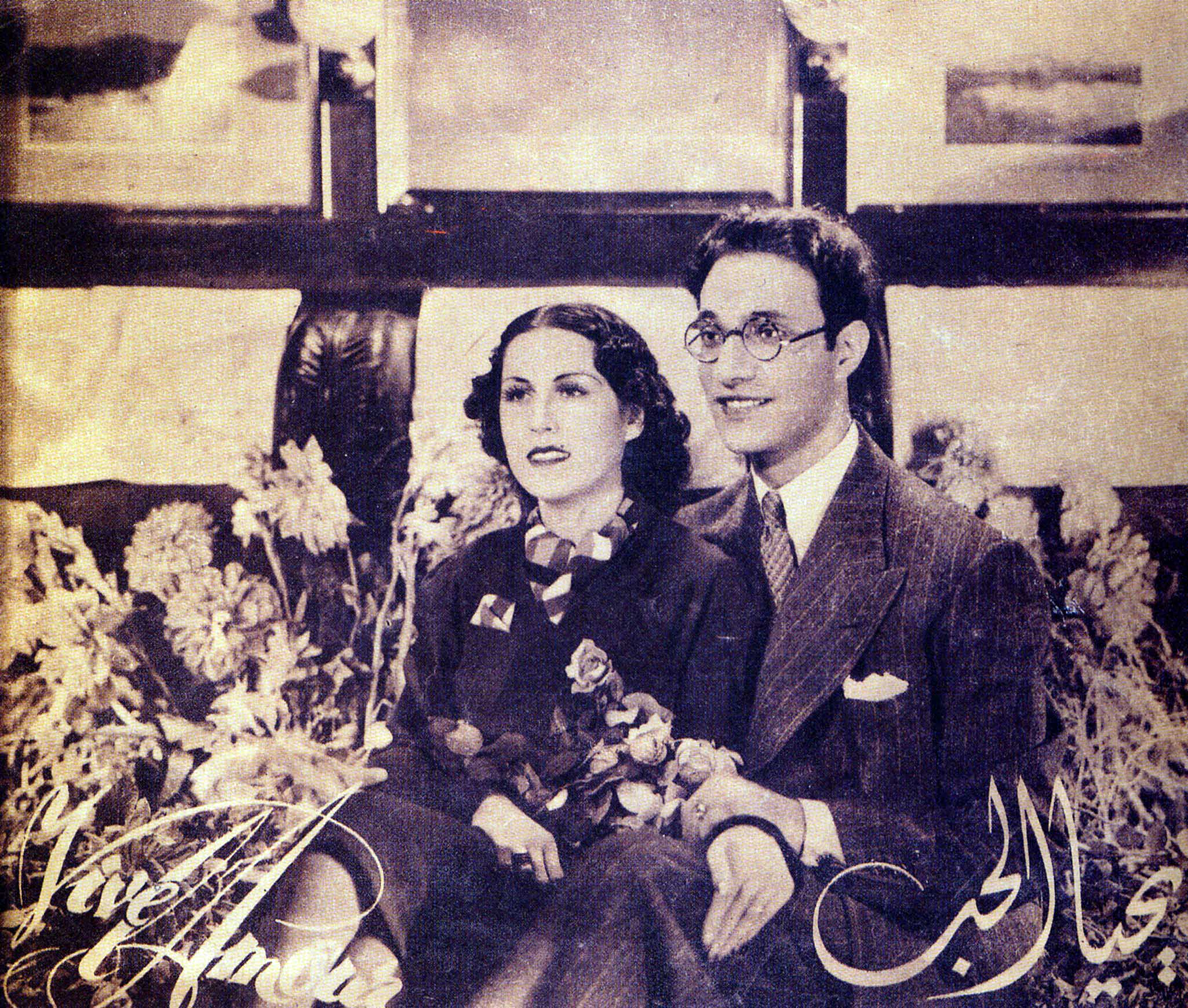
Publicity still for the Egyptian film Yahya el hub (1938)

Egypt's history of film started a few months following the Lumière Brothers' first film screening in Europe. In 1896, their film was taken to Egypt and was screened exclusively to a group of Egyptians in the Schneider Baths, Alexandria. A year later in the same city, the Cinematographe Lumière, was opened and had recurring screenings of the films. Egypt was one of the few countries of the Arab world and Middle East to be able to establish a film industry during their colonization. However, the types of films that were shot in Egypt at the time were more direct-cinema-styled documentaries or news reels. Eventually, they did more news reels and also began creating short films. In 1906, Felix Mesguich, who worked for the Lumière Brothers, went to Egypt to film a short film on his camera for them.

The film-viewing audience in Egypt kept growing until in 1908 there were a total of eleven movie theaters in the country. One of the French theaters brought in a camera and photographer to create local news reels to play exclusively in their own theater to compete with the other theaters. With this growing interest in film, Italian investors opened STICA film company in the city that was to be the hub of film, Alexandria, in 1917. Eventually, they shut down due to their low-quality films and the unfamiliarity of the producers with the Egyptian environment. One of the three films they created featured verses from the Muslim Qur'an vertically inverted which led it to being banned by government officials. Furthermore, their films had Italian actors and directors which did not help their case. With time, more films and newsreels were created. In 1926, the Lebanese Lama brothers came back from Argentina with their cameras and began creating Western-styled films in the deserts of Egypt. Up until that point, Egyptians had not been happy that most of the films that were created were not done by Egyptians and featured Western actors in an Egyptian setting.

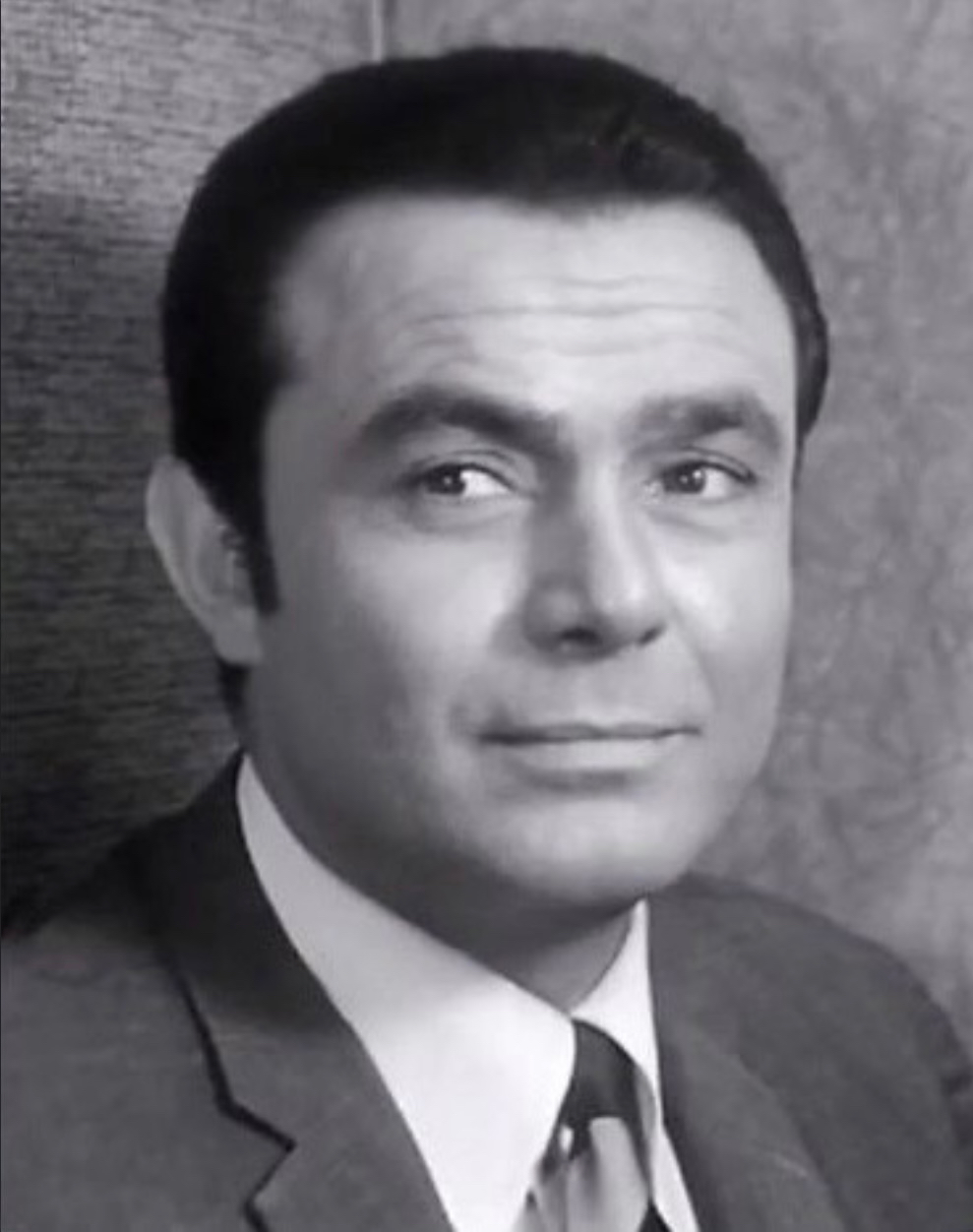
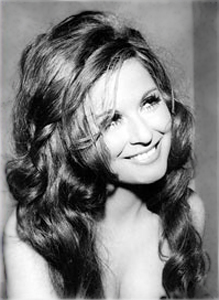
Salah Zulfikar and Soad Hosny, Egyptian film stars

Finally, the film Laila (1927) was vastly popular because it was produced by an Egyptian theater actress, Aziza Amir, and features a narrative that was familiar to most Egyptian audiences. Therefore, this film was considered by many the first Egyptian film (even though it was directed by a Turkish director) and was the first film to be produced by a woman. This marked the beginning of the national cinema in Egypt. Following this there was a peak in Egyptian film production. "From 1927 to 1930 two full-length films were produced a year, five films were released in 1931 and six in both 1933 and 1934". Although all these films were created independently, in 1935, Studio Misr was founded and was followed by six more studios from 1936 to 1948. Studio Misr did not dominate the industry, but was one of the big factors that launched Egyptian cinema (including their decision to move production from Alexandria to Cairo).

During this time, Egypt was the strongest Arab and Middle Eastern country that made films, which many other countries in the Middle East looked up to. Some of the Arab countries would attempt to copy the Egyptian melodramatic formulas and would make the film in the Egyptian dialect. With time, there were many changes that led many Egyptian filmmakers to start gradually making their movies in Lebanon instead. First, the Egyptian revolution of 1952 made it less stable politically in Egypt. Second, the nationalization of the film industry (1962) in Egypt slowly brought more restrictions to the films until the film censorship laws that were issued in 1976. The Egyptian presence in Lebanon impacted the Lebanese film output. Between 1963 and 1970, half of the movies that were produced in Lebanon were in the Egyptian dialect.

Eventually, the Egyptians moved back to Egypt due to the civil war in Lebanon. Following the censorship in Egypt, there was an increased sense of morality and modesty on screen (from the late 1960s to the 80s). These constraints led a change in film movements from romance and love stories to new realist and melodramatic realism. This wave impacted many of the films from today. According to Ibrahim Farghali, an Egyptian journalist, "To me, the Egypt of today seems influenced by the '68 movement in its call for change, the surmounting of traditional values, and liberation from oppression, whether political, social, ethical, or religious".

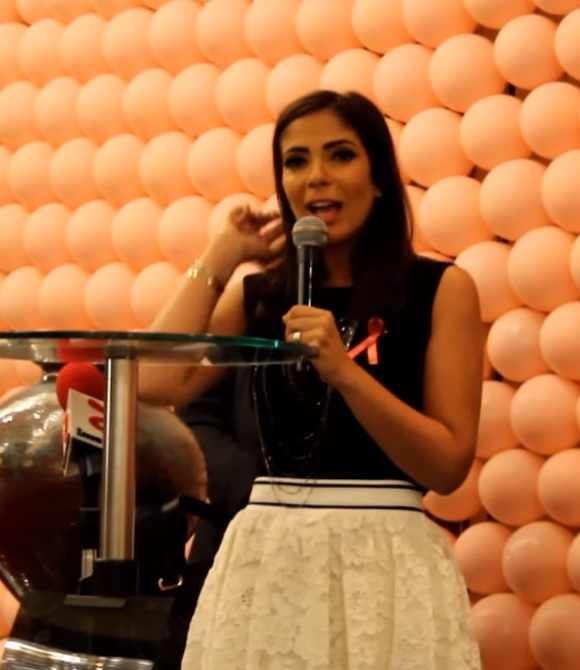
Mona Zaki, Egyptian film star

More recently, the film The Square (2013) which was a documentary about the Egyptian Revolution of 2011. It was also nominated for an Academy Award as Best Foreign Film. Although Egypt's film industry is not as powerful as it was before due to growing financial issues, it still dominates the Arab Cinema output especially in mainstream cinema where it outputs up to 77% of the films. That is because of an already established ecosystem for Egyptian cinema that saw its rise in the 1960s. Today, it includes leading regional players such as the distribution company MAD solutions. In addition to that, Egypt hosts a variety of film festivals which help sustain the local film culture, including notable regional festivals such as the El Gouna Film Festival, which boasts an impressive lineup of stars every year.

==== Directors and films ====
Notable Directors	Notable Films	Notes
Mohammed Karim	Zaynab (1930)	First Egyptian feature film.
Yousef Chahine (also the lead actor)	Cairo Station (1958)	Marks a significant phase for Egyptian cinematic realism.
Ezz El-Dine Zulficar	The River of Love (1960)	Marks a significant phase for Egyptian cinematic romance.
Atef El-Tayeb	The Bus Driver (1983)	Often mentioned to highlight the start of the New Realist movement.
Hassan El Imam	Watch Out for ZouZou (1972)	Marks the highest ever grossing film in history.
Jehane Noujaim	The Square (2013)	First film to be nominated for an Academy Award.

=== Iraq ===
==== History of the industry ====
Iraq has a long history of cinema since their independence in 1921. In the course of 82 years, from 1921 to 2003, 100 films have been produced and released in Iraq.

The first theater in Iraq opened its doors before 1920.

Post-independence period, more cinemas began to appear. A milestone was achieved in 1957 when 137 cinemas were established with a total capacity of 70,000 seats. After 1940, studios slowly began to appear in Iraq where Iraqi-made films would be produced.

One of the first studios in Iraq was opened in 1946 by the wealthy Sawda'i family in Baghdad. Studio Baghdad relied on specialists from Europe and Egypt to function. Its first movie, 'Aliya wa 'Isam, was recorded by the French director André Shatan, and released in 1948. In 1951, the Sawda'i family moved to Israel. For the next three years, various Iraqi's from abroad took over control until it was sold to Iraqi's who lived abroad in 1954. The studio still made movies for the next 12 years, until it was sold to the Coca-Cola Company in 1966, who wanted to turn the land and buildings into a new factory.

The government of Iraq established a department of cinema in 1959, which only produced a couple documentaries and two films per year.

During the reign of Saddam Hussein from 1979 to 2003, the cinema industry in Iraq was mainly filled with pro-Baathist propaganda. But this was the era where Iraqi cinema became significant and well-known in the Arab world.

Until 1991, Iraq was home to 275 cinemas across the nation, even though during the era of Saddam Hussein many theaters were slowly closed down. When the First Gulf War began, film-making equipment and celluloids were banned from entering the country because of an international embargo put on Iraq.

==== Post-invasion of Iraq ====
In 2003, film production in Iraq halted because of the U.S. invasion. In the same year, the National Film Archives in Iraq was bombed by the U.S. army and almost all of its celluloid collection was wiped away. Following from this, the Iraqi Independent Film Centre (IIFC) became active, which was formally established in 2009 by founder Mohammed Al-Daradji. It was the first Iraqi organization of its kind where cultural preservation of the movie industry was its objective.

In 2014, the Al-Nahj festival was founded, a film festival which was focused on short films and documentaries.

In 2017, the first Iraqi-made film was released after 27 years in Baghdad. The Journey is a psychological thriller film directed by Mohammed Al-Daradji with Zahraa Ghandour in the leading role.

==== Notable people in Iraqi cinema ====
Notables	Function
Mohammed Al-Daradji	Director and screenwriter
Zaraa Ghandour	Actress
Oday Rasheed	Director and screenwriter
Hassan Abdulrazzak	Screenwriter
Saad Salman	Director
Baz Shamoun	Director
Mohanad Hayal	Director
Ali Raheem	Director
Abbas Fahdel	Director
Basam Ridha	Actor
Zina Zaflow	Actress
Yasmine Hanani	Actress
Heather Raffo	Actress and playwright

=== Jordan ===
==== History of the Industry ====
The first known cinema in Jordan was the Petra Cinema in 1935. However, it is said that there was a cinema called 'Abu Siyah' in the 1920s and one of the first films it screened were Charlie Chaplin's silent films. As opposed to Egypt and Lebanon, Jordan joined the film industry much later, with their first films being released in the 1950s. The reason was most likely due to the fact that Jordan gained independence from the British mandate in 1946.

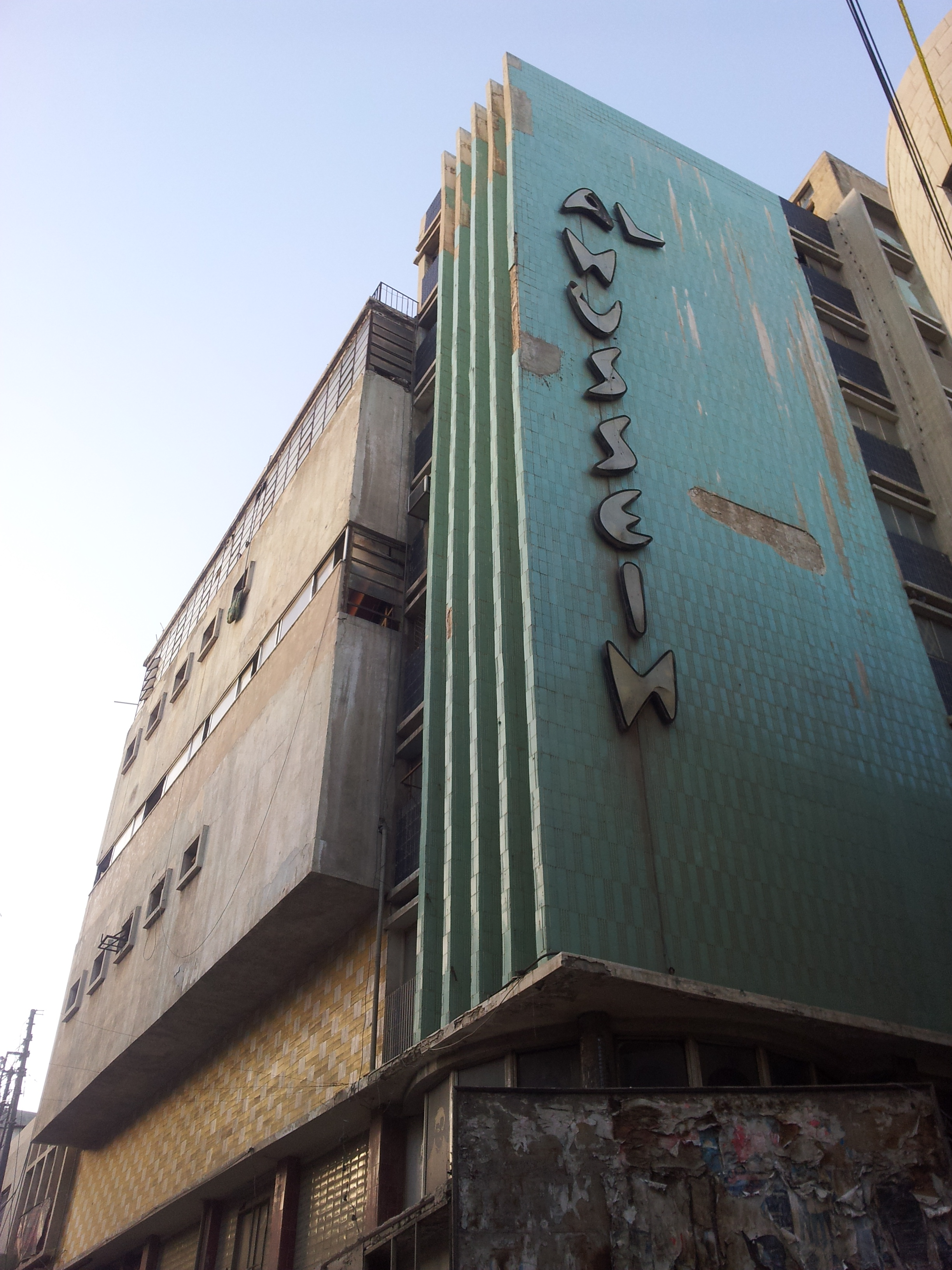
Al Hussein Cinema, an abandoned movie theater in Amman, Jordan.

The first film to be created in Jordan was Struggle in Jerash, being released eleven years later in 1957. The film was set in Jordan and Palestine and was a romance film (especially with the success of such films were in Egypt at the time). To this day, this film is used as a reference to how Jordan and Palestine looked like in the 1950s. This film also tried to introduce the idea of Jordanian nationalism. In fact, at one point in the film, the female love interest, Maria, says, "As long as I am by you I feel like I am home." The male love interest, Atif, replies "you are truly home," and then Maria says, "It's true, I was born in Jordan". It was directed by the Jordanian director, Wasif Al-Shaikh and was filmed by the Palestinian refugee, Ibrahim Hassan Sirhan, who created many documentary-styled films in Palestine in the years before. Historians disagree over whether this was documentary or narrative film, because it uses elements of both. In 1964, A Storm on Petra by the Egyptian director, Farooq Ajrama was created. This film was a collaboration between the film industries of Egypt, Jordan, Lebanon and Italy, and was distributed internationally.

Since then, only four new films were made. Instead, there were more Western studios that were filming in Jordan to use Wadi Rum and other desert-like areas as locations for many of their films. Some of the more famous examples include, Lawrence of Arabia (1962) and Indiana Jones and the Last Crusade (1989). Years later, the Abdul Hameed Shoman Foundation was founded in 1989 to help cultivate a cinema culture of Arab films in an attempt to establish the film industry in Jordan. Moreover, in 2003 the Royal Film Commission was established that was also an attempt to encourage the production of Jordanian films. As a result, more Jordanian films were being produced including, the 2014 Academy Award nominee, Theeb, Captain Abu Raed (2008), and 3000 Nights (2016) which was a recipient of the Royal Film Commission's Fund.

The Commission fund is central to Jordan's contemporary film infrastructure and serves as a backdrop for Arab cinema as a whole through a grants program, support for local filmmakers and an established series of workshops. Increasingly, Jordan has been capitalizing on its unique landscapes as ideal film location (especially Wadi Rum) and is now becoming a go to destination for Hollywood prestige pictures which around the world such as Lawrence of Arabia, The Martian, or even Star Wars: Rogue One. Therefore, natural landscapes can be considered an essential part of Jordan's film infrastructure because it enables the import of internationally acclaimed film productions.

==== Directors and films ====
Notable Directors	Notable Films	Notes
Wasif Al-Shaikh	Struggle in Jerash (1957)	First narrative film in Jordan
Farooq Ajrama	A Storm on Petra (1964)	
Amin Matalqa	Captain Abu Raed (2008)	
Naji Abu Nowar	Theeb (2014)	First film to be nominated for an Academy Award.
Mai Masri	3000 Nights (2016)	

=== Kuwait ===
Sons of Sinbad was the first movie shot in Kuwait, in 1939 by Alan Villier. The Kuwait Cinema Company was then established in 1954, with the first cinema located in the Sharq area. It now runs Cinescape, one of several prominent theatre chains available to cinema goers in Kuwait. The historical Kuwaiti film Bas Ya Bahar was produced in 1972 by Khalid al Siddiq, which tells the story of a pearl diver who is hunting for a large pearl so that he can marry a woman from a rich family. The film is set in Kuwait before the discovery of oil, and is critical of society and its treatment of women and religion. (See Cinema of Kuwait).

=== Lebanon ===
==== History of the Industry ====
The history of film in Lebanon goes back to the 1880s. Two years after the Lumière Brothers publicly projected their first film in December 1885 (Paris, France), they began sending traveling representatives to tour different countries to show their movies. One of the cities that they visited was Lebanon's capital city, Beirut. Several years later, in 1909, the first movie theater was opened in the same city by the Pathé Frères. These events helped cultivate a film-viewing culture into the country. Eventually, Jordano Pidutti, who was Italian driver to a well-known Lebanese family (who was fluent in Arabic and spent several years in the country) directed the first-ever silent film in Lebanon – The Adventures of Elias Mabrouk (1929). With the arrival of sound came many developments in Lebanese film production. In 1933, Lumar Film Company, the first ever-film production company opened and was funded by Herta Gargour. The technicians of the company were trained by Pathé Studios in France. By 1934, Lumar Film Company created the first Arabic-speaking Lebanese film, In the Ruins of Baalbak. This film was also the first to be completely created in an Arab country (including film development). After a five-year pause in progress, studios such as Studio Al-Arz and Studio Haroun started and had all the necessary equipment to make movies in the 1950s. Although the 50s, was when these films included countryside locations and the Lebanese dialect, they flopped commercially. As a result, studios started create films that were similar to the Egyptian melodramatic and bedouin films, which were doing well commercially at the time. Moreover, at this time, Egyptian filmmakers started going to Lebanon to film especially after the Egyptian revolution of 1952 and the political stability of Lebanon at the time. This led to films that did not have a distinct Lebanese identity since Lebanese filmmakers were trying to imitate the success of Egyptian films while Egyptian filmmakers were creating their same old Egyptian films in Lebanon. Between 1963 and 1970 there were 100 films produced in Lebanon, and from them 54 were in the Egyptian dialect.

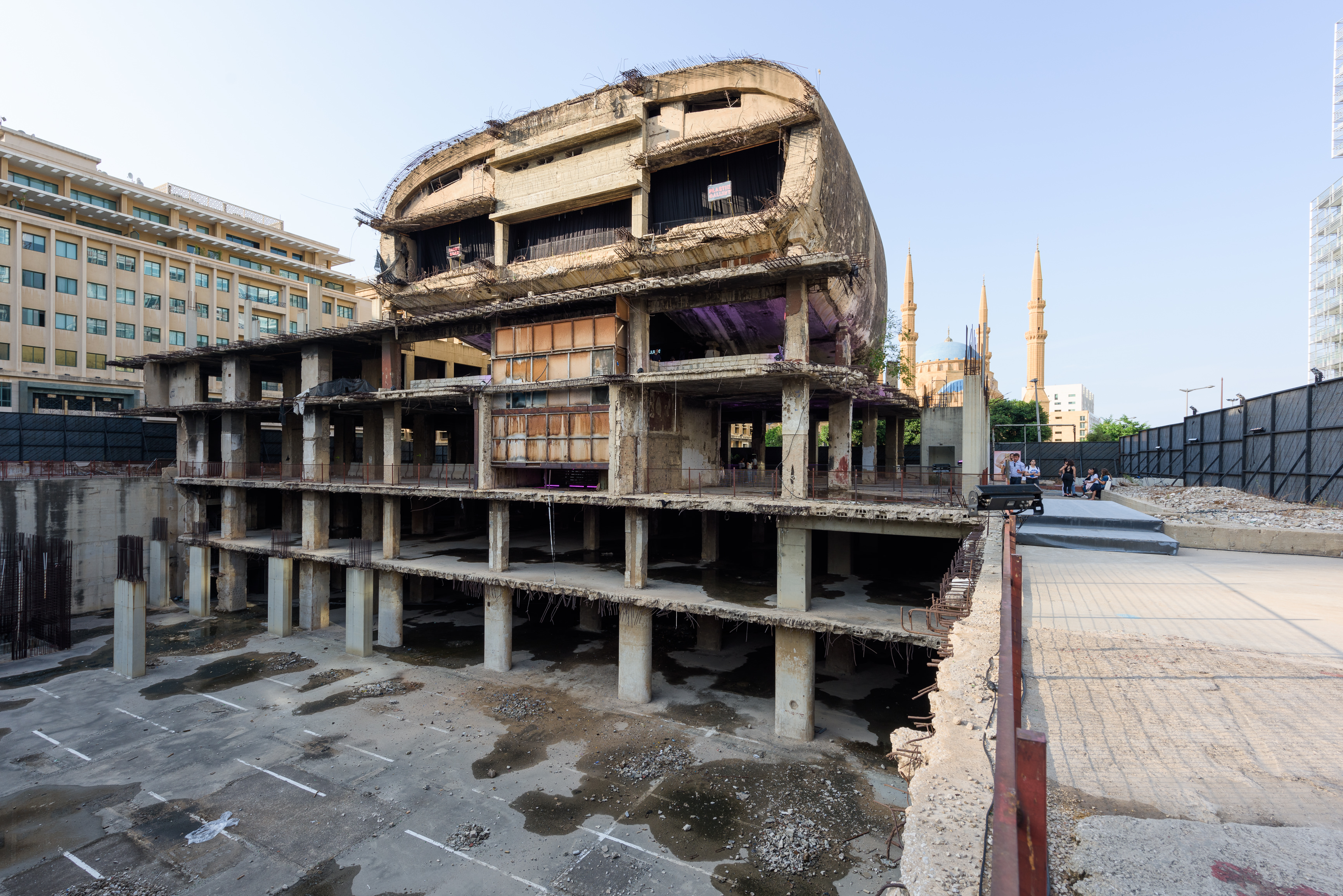
An unfinished movie theater from the 1960s, called The Egg in Beirut, Lebanon

Following the Lebanese Civil War (1975–1990), cinema infrastructure and many of the film reels were destroyed. The Egyptian filmmakers went back to Egypt since it was more politically stable especially following the end of the film ideology set by the public film sector. The Civil War in Lebanon brought more complications to filmmaking, especially when it came to resources. There, the focus was creating commercial films for television. This included entertainment shows for comedy, news reels, political documentaries (which were read by viewers differently depending on which political party they supported), and melodramas that were usually knock-offs of popular films. One film medium that became incredibly popular during the war was the viewing and creation of films through home video. This led the film West Beyrouth (Ziad Doueiri, 1998) to become a very popular feature film among Lebanese people at the time. The film highlighted the war through a narrative that combined clips and elements of home video with a conventional film (in a Lebanese dialect). This kickstarted Lebanese cinema into a renaissance period and helped solve the identity crisis.

Lebanon's modern film industry has only become more developed and more productive since then. Its current infrastructure (2019) includes some of the biggest and most numerous film institutions and funding bodies such AFAC (Arab Fund for Arts and Culture), Al Mawred (government), and Zoomal (crowd funding), and more. As for film festivals, Lebanon hosts the annual Beirut International Film Festival alongside less notable film festivals. As a result, by 2016 Lebanon has been one of the leading countries in cinema production. Though, due to a lack of mainstream infrastructure and bodies which support more independent cinema, it leads on independent movies front by producing 20% of Arab independent cinema a year.

Lebanon's modern film industry has only become more developed and more productive since then. In recent years, two Lebanese films have been nominated for an Academy Award for Best Foreign Language Film, The Insult (Ziad Doueiri 2017) and Capernaum (Nadine Labaki, 2018).

==== Directors and films ====
Notable Directors	Notable Films	Notes
Jordano Pidutti	The Adventures of Elias Mabrouk (1929)	First film made in Lebanon.
Jordano Pidutti	The Adventures of Abu Abd (1931)	Second film made in Lebanon. First film with Lebanese Funding.
Julio De Luca	In the Ruins of Baalbak (1934)	First film with sound. First film made completely in an Arab country.
Ali Al-Ariss	The Florist (1943)	First Lebanese-directed film. Contains Egyptian dialect.
George Kai	Remorse (1953)	
Ziad Doueri	West Beyrouth (1998)	
Ziad Doueri	The Insult (2017)	First film to be nominated for an Academy Award.
Nadine Labaki	Capernaum (2018)	Nominated for Academy Award. Highest-grossing Arab and Middle-Eastern movie of all-time with over US$65 million.

=== Oman ===
The cinema of Oman is reportedly small, with only one major film having been released. It hosts the Muscat Film Festival annually since 2005. Al-Boom, Oman's first feature-length film, premiered in 2006.

=== Palestine ===
==== History of the Industry ====
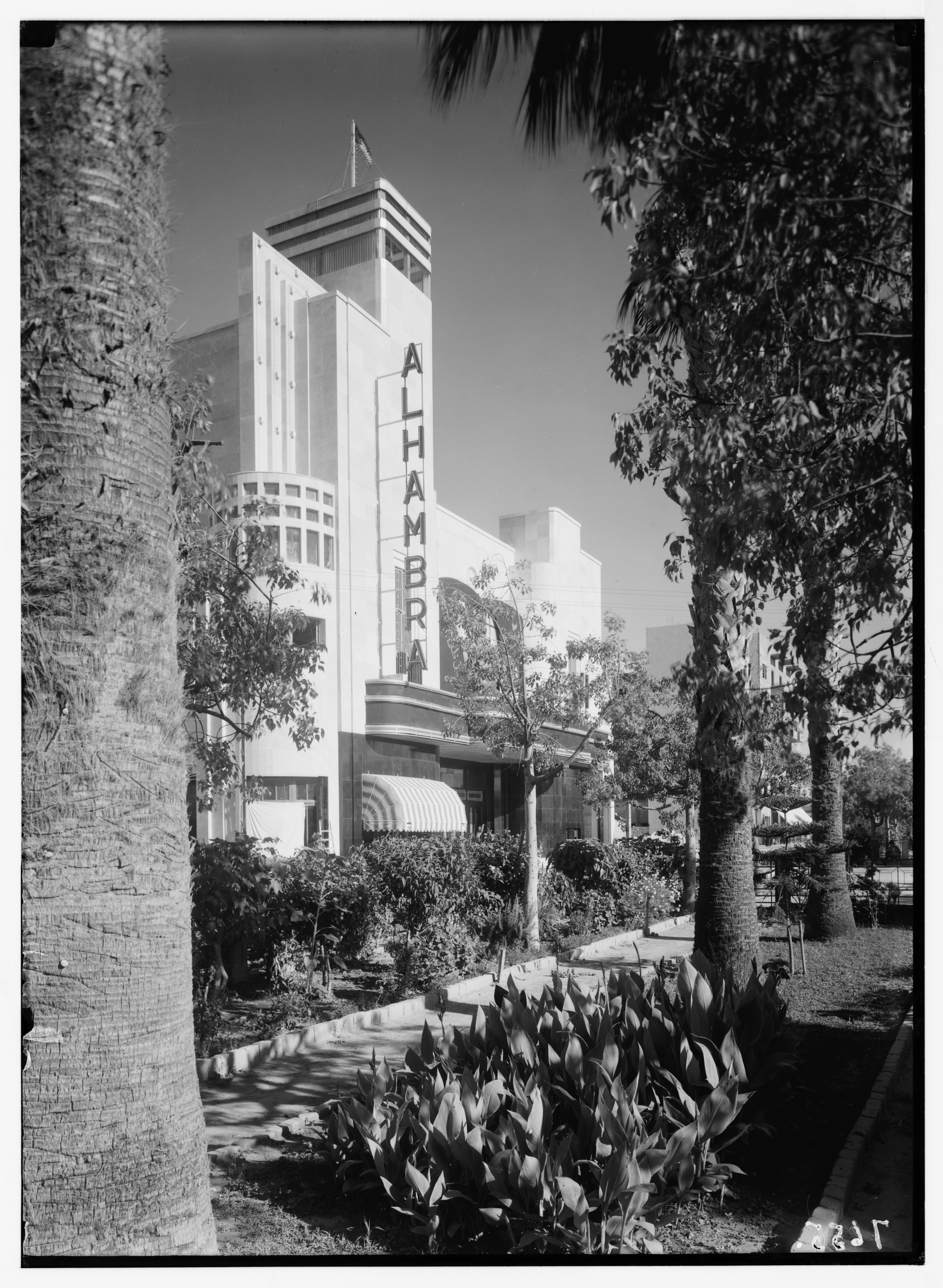
A photograph of Alhambra cinema, an early movie theater built in the 1930s in Jaffa, Mandatory Palestine.

Film in Palestine began when the Lumière brothers sought out to receive 'exotic' shots of Palestine as the proclaimed 'Holy Land' they used this in their film La Palestina en 1896 (1897). This film was simply observational footage of people living their everyday lives in Palestine. In 1900, the films of the Lumière brothers were screened in Europa Hotel in the city of Jerusalem and in 1908, Egyptian Jews opened a cinema in Jerusalem called, Oracle. Similar to Egypt and Lebanon, the first film made in Palestine was actually not made by Palestinians at all. It was called The First Film of Palestine (1911) made by Morey Rosenberg and was used to present Zionist awareness and the idea of Palestine being a "a land without people for a people without land". As for actual first Palestinian films, similar to the rest of the Arab world, they were direct-cinema-styled documentaries or travelogues. In the theaters, there was a law issued by the government in 1929 called The Moving Pictures Act, which censored films that contained immoral actions and behaviors that may in any way negatively impact the audience.

In 1935, Ibrahim Hassan Sirhan (who would later go and become the cinematographer of Jordan's first feature film Struggle in Jerash) documented a 20-minute film on the visit of the Saudi Prince Saud to Jerusalem and Jaffa. Such work solidifying Zionist reality, specifically news reels, continued until the late 1960s. With the Palestinian Nakba of 1948 and the declaration of the state of Israel, many Palestinians started to leave Palestine and there were no records of any Palestinian films at the time. However, there was an Egyptian film that was made called Girl from Palestine (1948) that discussed this issue. Following the political instabilities in Palestine, the Palestine Liberation Organization was formed in 1964. Still, most of the film-related operations of Palestinian filmmakers were happening outside the country. In 1968, the Palestinian Film Unit was founded in Jordan and the some films were being created in exile in Lebanon where many Palestinians found refuge. The first film created by the Palestinian Film Unit in Jordan was a documentary called No Peaceful Solution! (1968). After creating a few films in Jordan, there were some tensions between Jordanian Authorities and the Palestinian resistance movement, that lead to the film unit to be relocated to Lebanon.

By simply reading the titles of the films that the Palestinians were making at the time, the revolutionary mindsets and intentions were very clear. Some examples include, Why We Plant Roses, Why We Carry Weapons (1973), The Guns Will Never Keep Quiet (1973) and The Guns are Unified (1974). Regardless, by 1982, there were more than sixty movies that were created and almost all of them were documentaries. However, in 1987, the first feature-length fiction film that was filmed in historic Palestine was released called, Wedding in Galilee, by Michel Khleifi. This introduced post-revolutionary filmmaking that contained more experimental and fiction films (and elements). Unfortunately, even then, Palestine did not possess the resources and infrastructure to create nor to distribute their films to their native audiences. To this very day, the industry is slowly growing and more recently, two of their films have been nominated for an Academy Award for Best Foreign Language Film: Omar (2013) and Paradise Now (2005) (both by director Hany Abu-Assad).

Because a great part of the Palestinian population is scattered around the world, and due to political turmoil in the country, Palestine does not have the necessary governmental or private support to sustain its own film industry and therefore the few Palestinian filmmakers heavily rely on regional and international institutions which they most of the time have access to because of their dual nationality. Nonetheless, as a result of the Palestinian diaspora around the world, there have been numerous film festivals dedicated to the Palestinian theme which are located in foreign cities such as London, Doha, and even Chicago.

==== Directors and films ====
Notable Directors	Notable Films	Notes
Morey Rosenberg	The First Film of Palestine (1911)	First film made in Palestine, but was not by a Palestinian.
Mustafa Abu 'Ali	No Peaceful Solution! (1968)	
Michel Khleifi	Wedding in Galilee (1987)	First feature-length fiction film that was filmed in historic Palestine.
Elia Suleiman	Divine Intervention (2002)	
Hany Abu-Assad	Paradise Now (2005)	First film to be nominated for an Academy Award.
Hany Abu-Assad	Omar (2013)	Nominated for an Academy Award.
Annemarie Jacir	Wajib (2017)	Won the Cannes Jury Prize

=== Qatar ===
==== History of the industry ====
Qatar has little known cinema history. The Qatar Cinema Company was founded in 1970, which built a number of movie theaters showing foreign films. There has been little development of the Qatari film industry, though that may be set to change since the founding of the Doha Film Institute in 2010, which aims to bring together all of the country's film making initiatives and projects. Qatar also hosted an annual Doha Tribeca Film Festival launched in 2009 but was discontinued in 2012. Doha Film Institute was created by Sheikha Al-Mayassa bint Hamad bin Khalifa Al-Thani's initiative in 2010 to primarily foster a film culture and industry for Qatar's 2030 vision of a knowledge based economy but also to alternatively enhance the region's film industry. It does so primarily through grants, workshops, labs and development activities which aims at the local Qatari talent's development but is also open to regional MENA talent. For its first initiatives, Doha Film Institute partnered with the Tribeca Enterprise to launch the Doha Tribeca Film Festival which aimed to foster a grass root film industry but was ended after four years to make way to other initiatives such as the annual Qumra (five editions) and the Ajyal Film Festival (seven editions). The Doha Film Institute's new trajectory with its new initiatives is to focus its efforts fostering interest from an early in the local community, thus the children based judging for the Ajyal Film Festival. It is also to strengthen the making and appeal of its annually granted projects through the Qumra projects.

Qatar's current exhibition and distribution scheme is encouraged by a high demand of film viewing in theaters in addition to widespread online viewing, with the latter encourage theatrical visits from entertainment seekers in Qatar In 2017 only, there was a surge of 50 cinemas across Qatar in only 6 months as there was a rise of 35% in moviegoers across the nation. The exhibition landscape is competitively shared between worldwide exhibitors such as Novo, Vox and Gulf Media but also locally based theaters such as Landmark and Doha cinema (Souq Waqif).

Qatar's current contemporary cinema infrastructure includes its national film center charged of local and regional development of the film scene along with a competitive distribution and growing theatrical distribution landscape. Qatar does not have many feature films made by local talent, on the other hand, Qatari film companies have funded many films which won prestigious awards. The following is a list of notable films financed by Qatar.

==== Notable directors and films (funded) ====
Notable Directors	Notable Films	Notes
Asghar Farhadi	The Salesman (2016)	Oscar Winning
Nadine Labaki	Where Do We Go Now (2011), Capernaum (2018)	Oscar Nominated
Hany Abu-Assad	Omar (2013)	Nominated for an Academy Award.
Abderrahmane Sissako	Timbuktu (2014)	Caesar Winning, Oscar nominated
Naji Abu Nawar	Theeb (2016)	Oscar Nominated and BAFTA Winning

=== Saudi Arabia ===
==== History ====
Initially, Saudi Arabia did not refute the idea of movie theaters and allowed independent improvised cinemas which functioned outside of government oversight. Similar to many of the other Arab countries, cinema was introduced into Saudi Arabia by westerners, who were working for oil and gas companies in Saudi Arabia, such as Aramco, at the time. This led to the building of projector screens in residential buildings in the 1930s. The cinemas went on to screen Egyptian films of the golden era and in 1959, almost 70% of the films made in Egypt that year, were exported in 16mm film to Saudi Arabia. However, these films were censored and were only supposed to be screened privately. Later on, this move was blocked for concerns that cinema would interfere with religious public and private life, therefore leading in a total cinema blackout during the 1990s and early 2000s. the exception being the IMAX system instated by Khalid in the city of Khobar which only displayed scientific and religious oriented content. A potential explanation to why the religious scholars were not fans of cinema, according to Shafik, could be because film is seen as bringing inanimate objects to life, which was something that seemed to compete with the power of God. However, there have been reports of secret cinemas operating in recent years, with organizers denying that it promotes un-Islamic values. There are also reports of many Saudi citizens traveling to neighboring states to go to the cinema, or watching films online. Furthermore, the film industry is receiving support from Prince Al-Waleed bin Talal, owner of entertainment company Rotana, which some see as an encouraging sign for the reestablishment of cinema in Saudi Arabia.

With the rise of digital and social network, pressure was mounting on Saudi Arabia in regards to the permissibility of cinemas as many were watching films online anyway. In 2005, an improvised cinema in Riyadh was officially opened though limited to men and children only to prevent gender mixing in a public space. This was not the only attempt to bring back cinema; in 2006, How's It Going? became the first fully Saudi funded feature film. It also starred a Saudi actress. here have been several additional signs of relaxation, for example, Jeddah has started hosting a European Film Festival since 2006, and a single Saudi film festival was held in Dammam in 2008, though this did not meet with a favorable response from some of the more extreme religious leaders. Furthermore, the film Menahi was screened in Riyadh in 2009, although women were banned from attending. Finally, in 2017, efforts led by the King's son and Crown Prince of Saudi Arabia, Mohamed Bin Salman, targeted the enhancement of the entertainment sector in Saudi Arabia including strengthening the theatre and cinema infrastructure in Saudi Arabia.

The kingdoms filmography started in 2004 with an approval from the Ministry of Culture for a location shoot in the UAE. What followed was a small string of local talent counting on foreign exhibitions to showcase their work:

Notable Directors	Notable Films
Abdullah Al-Muheisen	Shadow of Silence (2004)
Izidore Musallam	How's It Going? (2006)
Haifaa al-Mansour	Wadjda (2014)
Mahmoud Sabbagh	Baraka Meets Baraka (2016)

=== United Arab Emirates ===
There is an expanding film industry in the United Arab Emirates, strengthened by the annual Gulf Film Festival showcasing cinematic productions from the region, as well as the Dubai International Film Festival, which was launched in 2004. UAE film-makers have been able to contribute a large volume of films to these festivals. UAE's first horror film is set to premier in the fall of 2013 after some delays in production.

== Non-Arab countries ==
=== Iran ===
==== Notable people in Iran cinema ====
Notables	Function
Abbas Kiarostami	Director
Behrouz Vossoughi	Actress
Reza Attaran	Director and actress
Parviz Shahbazi	Director
Golshifteh Farahani	Actress
Zar Amir Ebrahimi	Actress
Majid Majidi	Director
Asghar Farhadi	Director
Saeed Roustayi	Director
Mehran Modiri	Director and actress
Bahman Farmanara	Director
Bahram Beyzai	Director
Ali Hatami	Director
Dariush Mehrjui	Director

=== Israel ===
==== History of the industry ====
The history of Israeli cinema is so closely related to the history of the state of Israel itself since some of the wars and international conflicts that the country was inevitably drawn into by the war torn Middle East, inspired Israeli film directors and gave rise to the different periods of the nation's film industry.

Some authors consider 1948 as the year in which the Israeli film industry was born along with the establishment of the state of Israel, others hold that its trajectory dates back to the 1920s when the silent films of Ya'akov Ben-Dov and other Israeli film directors made their appearance, but what they all agree on is that Zionist Realism Cinema dominated the industry until the 1950s. The films of this cinematic current were part of the material used by Zionist organizations during the pre-statehood period to encourage the migration of European Jews to their homeland, and emphasized the agricultural way of living in the Israel and featured traditional symbols that Jews could relate to, such as the Star of David and the Menorah. Between the end of World War II and the declaration of the Jewish state, Israeli films portrayed holocaust survivors and their journey to escape their tragic past of persecution, homelessness, and desolation to become true Israelis and fulfill their "duty" to claim the land, build settlements, and begin a new life. Post-1948 films shifted from the Holocaust theme and started to highlight the new Israeli 'heroes', mainly the soldiers and the 'Sabras' (newborn Israelis). After the outbreak of the Arab-Israeli conflict, these films were one way in which the new state forged a nationalist narrative and portrayed how the perfect Hebrew Israeli men should be This branch of the Zionist Realism genre is called the Heroic-Nationalist Cinema.

In the 1960s-70s, two new film genres were born. The first one, the Bourekas films, named after a popular local pastry, were comedies and melodramas that depicted the inter-ethnic conflict between Mizrahi and Ashkenazi Jews, which generally was resolved by means of the consummation of a mixed marriage. The ingenuity of Bourekas filmmakers was, on one hand, their ability to use comedy and sentimentalism as a way to avoid serious involvement with more problematic issues and, on the other, their effort to legitimize Mizrahim as part of the Jewish-Israeli society through the marriage plot. The most famous of these films was Ephraim Kishon's Sallah Shabati (1964), which was the first Israeli film nominated for an Oscar award and a turning point in the Israeli film industry's history due to its combination of elements from the new and modern Israeli cinema. The second genre to appear during these decades was the New Sensibility cinema, also labeled as personal cinema or the Israeli New Wave. This current was characterized by low production budget films with urban scenery, debutant actors or non-actors as protagonists, experimental cinematic techniques, open-ended plots, and unconventional narrative strategies. However, the most important thing connecting these films was a strong motivation to break with the political subordination of films to Zionist ideology and a sense of fight for the recognition of film maker's artistic autonomy.

The aftermath of the Yom Kippur War in 1973, the electoral victory of Menachen Begin in 1977, and the rise of the Likud party in the country's political arena created the perfect environment for the birth of a new cinematic trend: films of the Political Cinema or Protest Cinema of the 1980s was the way in which Israeli filmmakers showed their opposition to the new right-wing government and protested against the political and social reality in Israel. The themes handled in these films were varied; they portrayed the complexity of the relationship between Holocaust survivors and native Israeli Jews; they criticized Israeli militarism, and they exposed the colonialist side of the Zionist mission in Palestine. Another important aspect of this new cinematic wave was that it questioned the Israeli identity and it did so by altering the traditional characteristics of the protagonists; for instance, the former 'Sabra hero' of the Zionist Realism cinema was now presented as a physically impotent, mentally damaged, weak, or frustrated soldier.

==== Notable people in Israeli cinema ====
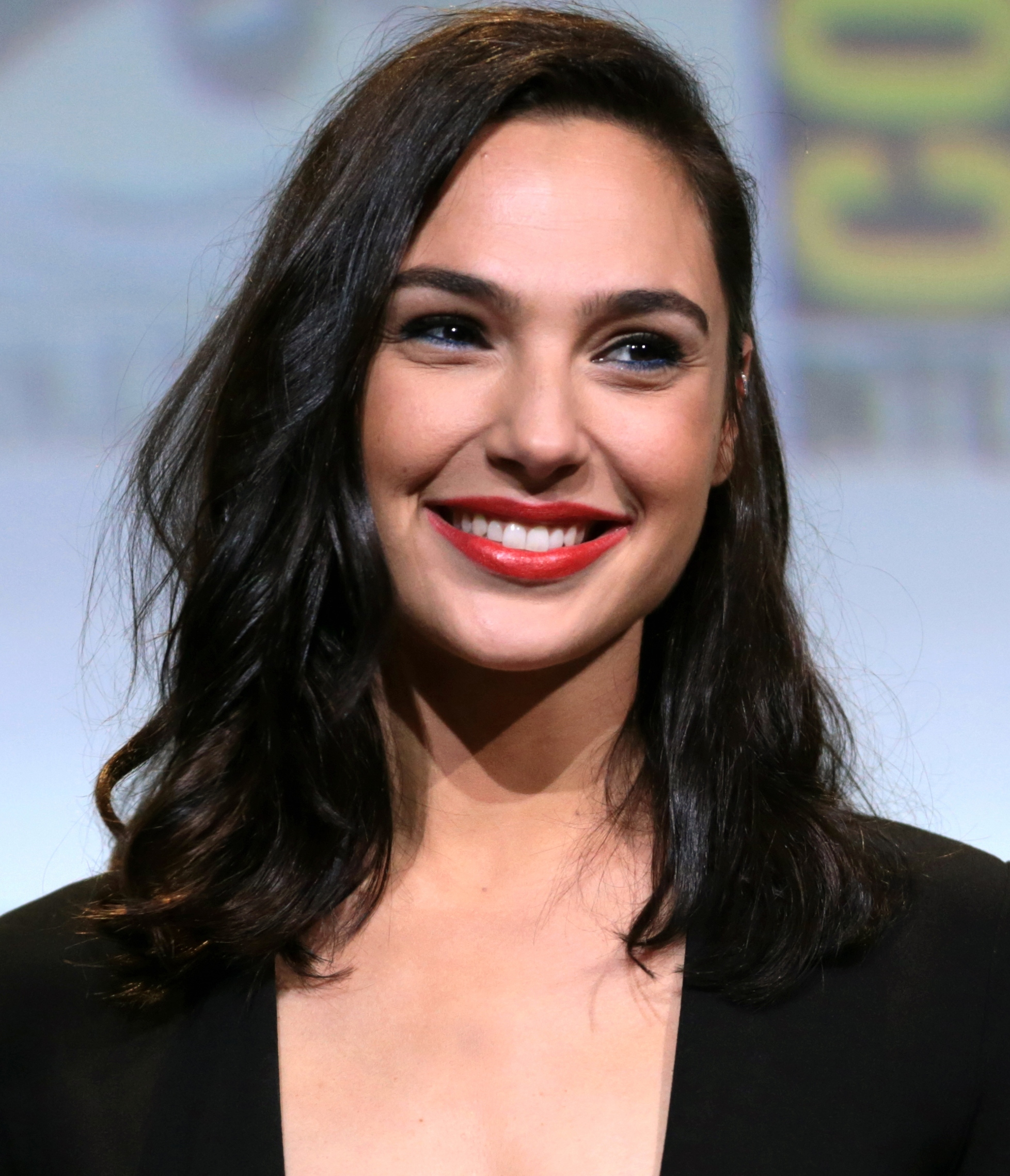
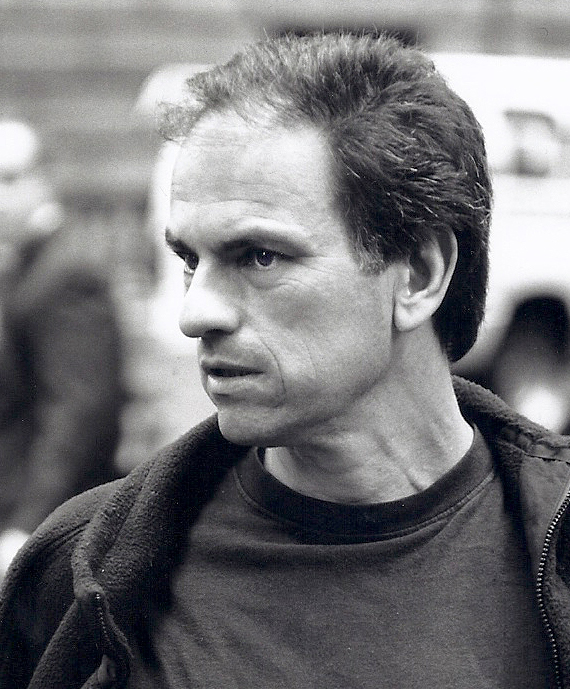
Gal Gadot (actress) and Avi Nesher (director and producer)
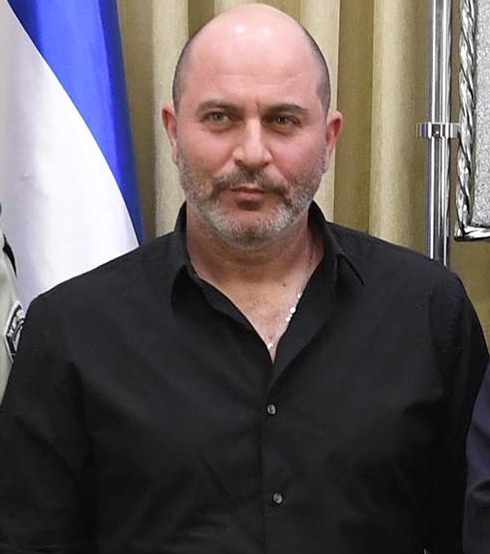
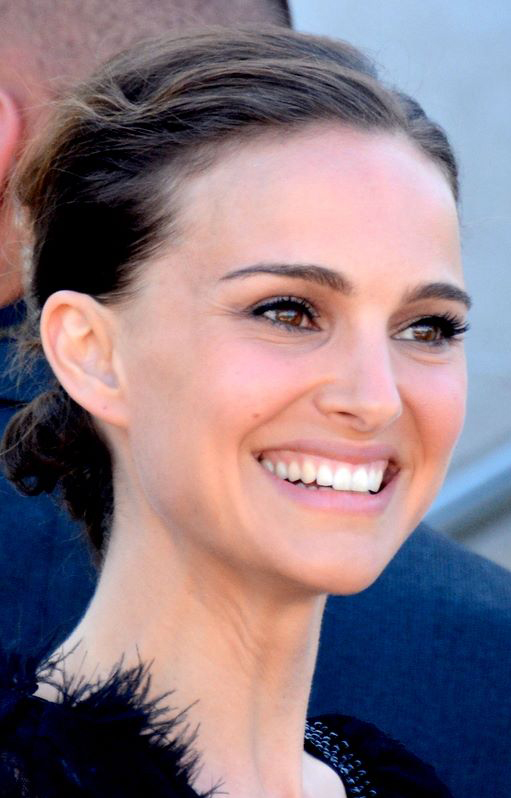
Lior Raz (actor and screenwriter) and Natalie Portman (actress, director and producer)

Notables	Function
Gal Gadot	Actress
Menahem Golan	Director and producer
Uri Zohar	Director
Lior Ashkenazi	Actor
Lior Raz	Actor and screenwriter
Avi Nesher	Director and producer
Amos Gitai	Director
Eliad Cohen	Actor and producer
Alona Tal	Actress
Joseph Cedar	Director and screenwriter
Ayelet Zurer	Actress
Guy Nattiv	Director, screenwriter and producer
Oded Fehr	Actor
Eran Riklis	Director
Natalie Portman	Actress, director and producer
Ari Folman	Director

== See also ==
- Cinema of Africa
- Cinema of Asia
- Cinema of Central Asia
- East Asian cinema
- List of cinema of the world
- South Asian cinema
- Southeast Asian cinema
- World cinema
