= Burbank International Film Festival =

- Location: Burbank, California, U.S.
- Founded: 2009
- Founded by: Val Tonione
- Language: International
- Website: burbankfilmfest.org

The Burbank International Film Festival (BIFF) is an annual film festival held since 2009 in Burbank, California, United States. It was founded by Val Tonione, and awards are distributed to filmmakers that have focused on social and environmental issues.

In 2023, the festival honored filmmaker Tim Burton at their 15th annual film festival.

== 2009 ==
It ran from March 22 to 29 at the Woodbury University.

== 2010 ==
It ran from July 31 to August 7 at the Woodbury University. The winners were:

- Best Feature Film: Charlie Valentine
- Best Short Film: True Beauty, This Night
- Best Documentary: Gus, An American Icon
- Best Student Film: Jale
- Best Film Noir: Sage
- Best Animated Short: Skylight
- Best Drama: Tick Tock (Tracey Birdsall)
- Best Western: The Sierra
- Best Music Video: "City of Noise"
- Best Foreign Film: Andheri
- Best Sci-Fi Comedy: Fudgy Wudgy Fudge Face and The Adventures of Zion Man & The Supreme Commander
- Best Sci-Fi: Enigma
- Best Commercial: HBO's The Deal Breaker and Levi's' True Love Ad
- Best Cinematography: Mansfield Path
- Best Based on A True Story: Grace Bedell
- Best Directing: Daniel Sametz for Buroinfierno
- Best Socially Conscious Film: The Elephant in the Living Room and The Cartel
- Shortest Short: Peel
- Best Screenplay: Daniel D. Molinoff for Outrider
- Best Historical Piece: A Letter from Home
- Best Editing: James Coblentz for Mansfield Path
- Best Acting: Peter Green for Poetry Man
- President's Award: Poetry Man

== 2011 ==
It ran from September 15 to 18 at the Burbank AMC Theatres. The winners were:

- Best Feature (Narrative): A Lonely Place for Dying
- Best Feature (Animation): Fullmetal Alchemist: The Sacred Star of Milos
- Best Short Film (Narrative): Bathing and the Single Girl
- Best Short Film (Animation): Friday Night Tights
- Best Documentary: Canine Instinct
- Best Indie Animation: Biology
- Currator's Choice Award for Animation: The Fantastic Flying Books of Mr. Morris Lessmore
- Best Foreign Film: Augenblicke
- Best Student Film (Narrative): Dr. Thompson
- Best Student Film (Animation): An Awkward Situation
- Best Screenplay (Unproduced): The King's Son
- Best Writing (Original): Amanda
- Best Writing (Adaptation): Tell-Tale
- Best Writing (Animation / Original): Supa Pirate Booty Hunt: Music Saves Lives PSA
- Best Writing (Animation / Adaptation): Fullmetal Alchemist: The Sacred Star of Milos
- Bella Fe Films / FrameFroge Previz (core version) development scholarship winner: Imprinted
- FrameFroge Previz 3D Pro version software winner: To the End of the World
- Best Commercial: Adidas' The Aerialist
- Best Director (Narrative): Martin Barigel for Augenblicke
- Best Director (Animation): Kazuya Murata for Fullmetal Alchemist: The Sacred Star of Milos
- Best Actor in a Leading Role: Sam Gipson for The Insides of a Lamb
- Best Actress in a Leading Role: Emma Karawady for Death Wish
- Best Voice Acting: Spike Spencer for Supa Pirate Booty Hunt: Music Saves Lives PSA
- Best Cinematography: Greg Williams for Tell-Tale
- Best Film Editing: Nicholas Goodman for Help Me Please
- Best Costume Design: Red Princess Blues
- Best Visual Effects: Divination and Defective Detective
- Best Character Design: Supa Pirate Booty Hunt: Music Saves Lives PSA
- Best Production Design: Supa Pirate Booty Hunt: Music Saves Lives PSA
- Best Art Direction: Supa Pirate Booty Hunt: Music Saves Lives PSA
- Best Sound Editing: Supa Pirate Booty Hunt: Music Saves Lives PSA
- Best Music: Defective Detective
- Best Science Fiction Film: The New World
- Best Horror/Thriller Film: Blackstone
- Best Comedy Film: Pepper
- Best Drama Film: Freak
- Best Music Video: "Stockpiling Poison"
- Flappers Funny Film Contest: Runyon: Just Above Sunset
- Sonic Sound-off: Best Band: Outliar
- Feature Selection Award: Narrative Film: Wong Flew Over the Cuckoo's Nest
- Feature Selection Award: Short Film: Ingrid Pitt: Beyond the Forest
- Feature Selection Award: Animated Feature: Quantum Quest: A Cassini Space Oddesssey
- Feature Selection Award: Documentary: Adventures in Plymptoons

== 2012 ==
It ran from September 5 to 9 at the Burbank AMC Theatres. The winners were:

- Best Feature Documentary: Greedy, Lying, Bastards
- Best Short Documentary: Among Giants
- Best Adapted Screenplay: The Legend of Mccoy Mountain
- Best Original Screenplay: Jack and Annie's Co List
- Best Music Video: "Space Tree"
- Best Student Film: Impetuous
- Best Animated Short Film: Devils, Angels and Dating and Beaver Creek episode 7
- Best Foreign Feature Film: Ecstasy
- Best Foreign Short Film: I Am Neda
- Best Commercial: True Power
- Best Comedy Short Film: Camp Chapel
- Best Short Film by Women: When You Find Me and Neighbors
- Best Horror Short Film: The Curse
- Best Science Fiction Short Film: The Taste of Copper
- Best Comedy Short Contest: High Maintenance
- Comic Book / Graphic Novel Competition
  - Best Cover: Infex
  - Best Comic Book: M3
  - Best Graphic Novel: Trench Coats, Cigarettes and Shotguns
- Best Thriller Feature Film: In The Eyes of a Killer
- Best Thriller Short Film: Tracer Gun
- Best Dramatic Feature Film: Things I Don't Understand
- Best Dramatic Short Film: Masque
- Best New Media: The Division
- Best Actor: Adam Sinclair for Ecstasy
- Best Actress: Danielle Harris for Shiver and Kelli Garner for Neighbors
- President's Innovation Award: White Room: 02B3

== 2013 ==
It ran from September 4 to 8 at the Downtown Burbank. The winners were:

- Best Feature Documentary: Walk On
- Best Short Documentary: Jujitsing Reality
- Best Adapted Screenplay: Lifetime Loser
- Best Original Screenplay: Hard Promises and Arc of Eloides
- Best Student Film: Boots and Hear Me Roar
- Los Angeles County Student Filmmakers Award: Being and Ingrained
- Best Animated Short: Tailed
- Best International Animated Short: Wings of Time
- Best Foreign Feature Film: Los Traficantes
- Best Comedy Feature Film: Chasing Taste
- Best Foreign Short: Sweet Love
- Best Comedy Short Film: Driving Tinseltown
- Best Film by Women: Ghost Exchange
- Best Faith Based Short Film: Static
- Best Horror Short Film: Through the Woods
- Best Science Fiction Short Film: Supervised
- Best Horror Feature Film: A House Is Not A Home
- Best Thriller Feature Film: Chink
- Best Dramatic Feature Film: A Fish Story
- Best Thriller Short Film: Incident on Highway 73
- Best Dramatic Short Film: Imagine
- Best New Media: On Begley Street
- Best New Media – Comedy: Heavenly Help
- Best Actor: Scott Wolf for Imagine and Eddie McClintock for A Fish Story
- Best Actress: Jayne Heitmeyer for A Fish Story and Elizabeth Schmidt for Incident on Highway 73

== 2014 ==
It was held from September 3 to 7 at the Downtown Burbank. The winners were:

- President's Innovation Award: The Moving Picture Co. 1914
- Best Dramatic Short: The Last Session
- Best Feature Documentary: Better Things: The Choices of Jeffrey Catherine Jones
- Best Short Documentary: Pie Lady of Pie Town
- Best Student Film: Into The Silent Sea
- Los Angeles County Student Filmmakers Award: Unmatched
- Best Animated Short: The Numberlys
- Best Foreign Short: Butterfly Dreams
- Best Comedy Short: Heal Thyself
- Best Short by Women: Sophie
- Best Horror Short: Playing with the Devil
- Best Science Fiction Short: Stranger at the Pentagon
- Best Thriller Short: The Monsters
- Best New Media – Comedy: The Impression Guys
- Best New Media – Drama: Star Trek Continues: Fairest of Them All
- Best Faith Based Film: Families Are Forever
- Best Adapted Screenplay: The Guide
- Best Original Screenplay: The Seduction of Auntie Rose
- Best Actor: Daniel Baldwin for Wisdom To Know The Difference
- Best Actress: Teri Polo for The Last Session
- Best Feature – Drama: Wisdom To Know The Difference
- Best Feature – Thriller : Mercenaries
- Best Feature – Films by Women : The Piano: An Odyssey
- Best Feature – Foreign Film: Miss Julie
- Best Feature – Science Fiction: Time Lapse
- Best Feature – Faith Based: The God Question

== 2021 ==
It was held in Downtown Burbank in September 2021. The winners were:

- President's Innovation Award: The First Six Lessons
- Best Animated Short: Falafel Cart by Abdullah Al-Wazzan
- Best Foreign Short: Synthetic Love
- Best Comedy Short: Good Head
- Best Feature – Foreign Film: Million Love in Me

== 2022 ==
Winners List of BIFF Awards 2022

- Best Adapted Screenplay: Rescue Heart – Writer: Tane McLure
- Best Original Screenplay: Those Who Know – Writer: Steve Smith
- Best Television Pilot Script: Felandra: Heroine of Darkness – Writer: Blake Zawadzki
- L.A. County Student Young Filmmaker Award: Trapped – Director: Violet Zeug (California School for the Arts)
- Collegiate Filmmaker Spotlight Award: Wide Open Dreams – Director: Paulina Jaskiewicz (SUNY Westchester College)
- Best Documentary Short Film: La Fiera: The Piera Rodriguez Story – Director: Spencer Trinwith
- Best Documentary Feature Film: Tiger 24 – Director: Warren Pereira
- Best Comedy Short Film: Other Plans – Directors: Bryan Erwin & Sally Brooks
- Best Drama Short Film: Adonai – Director: Gil Green
- Best Female Artists Award: For Honor – Directors: Yasmine Gazelle & Charles B. Clifton
- Best Animated Short Film: Space Race – Director: Shane Dioneda
- Best Science Fiction/Fantasy Short Film: Balloon – Director: Jeremy Merrifield
- Best Horror/Thriller Short Film: Be Mine – Directors: Ryan Famulari & Anthony Famulari
- Tim Burton “Native Burbank” Visionary Award: Lodo – Director: Alessandro Gentile
- Best Faith-Based Short Film: Uncommon Negotiator – Director: Brian Glassford
- Best Faith-Based Feature Film: No More Goodbyes – Director: James Ganiere
- Best Film Score / Musical Composition for a Short Film: Night-Blooming Cereus – Music by Pancho Burgos-Goizueta
- Best Film Score / Musical Composition for a Feature Film: Liberty – Music by Jeremie De Witte
- Best LGBTQ Short Film: We All Die Alone – Director: Jonathan Hammond
- Best LGBTQ Feature Film: The Way Out – Director: Barry Jay
- Best Foreign Short Film: Selfie Academy – Director: Kristof Banszki
- Best Foreign Feature Film: Liberty – Director: Phil De Witte
- Audience Award for Short Film: White Elephant
- Audience Award for Feature Film: The Way Out
- Best Feature Film: Re-Opening: A Lockdown Mockumentary – Directors: Chris Guerra & Matthew John Koppin
