= Farah Al-Hashem =

Kuwaiti filmmaker

Farah ALHashim
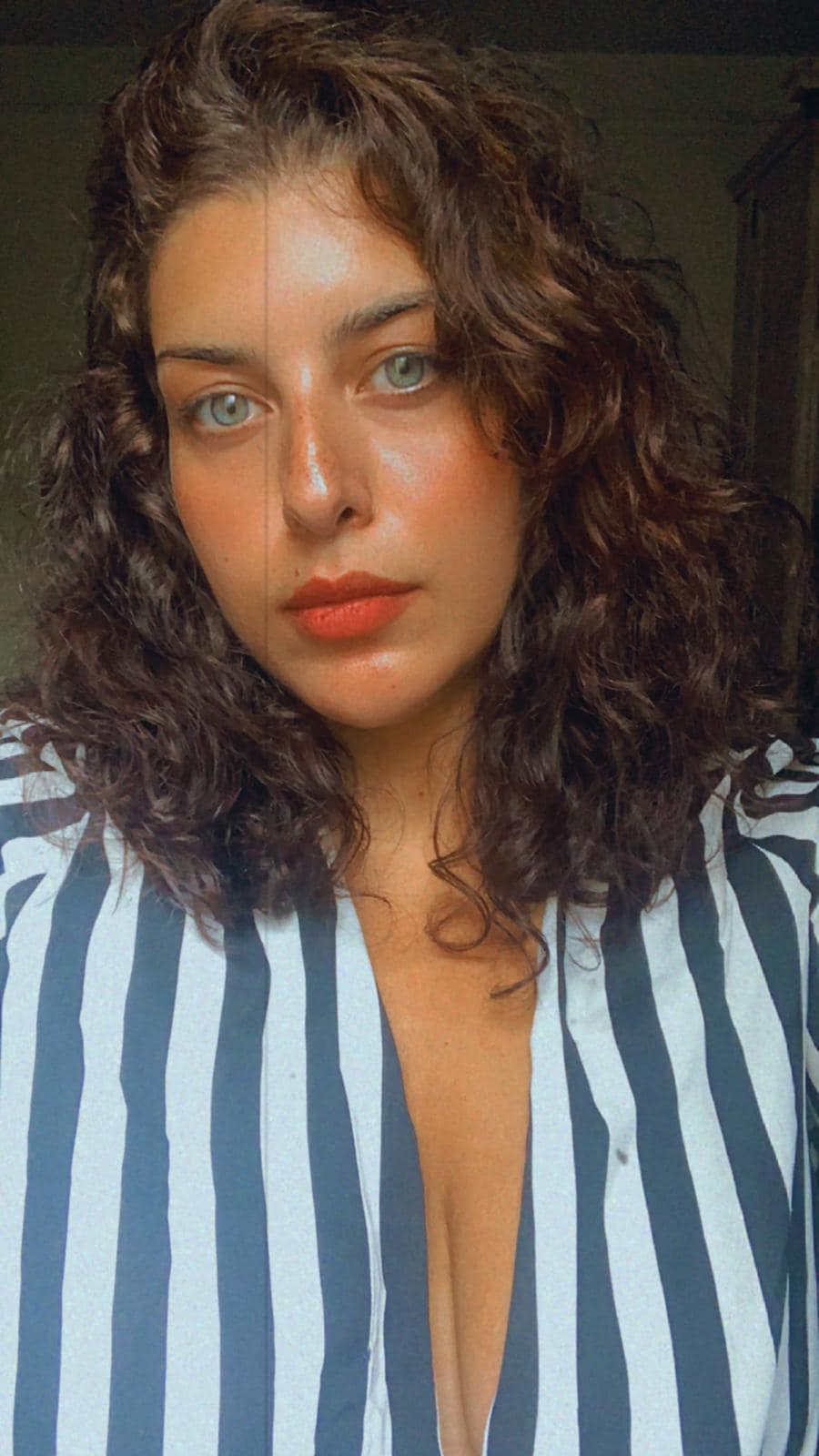
- Education: Panthéon-Sorbonne University
- Occupation: Filmmaker
- Years active: 2011 - present
- Known for: Breakfast in Beirut, The Fifth Day, Beirut Borhan, Ces Petits Riens, 7Hours

Farah ALHashim (also Farrah Zaine) is a Kuwaiti-Lebanese filmmaker and journalist based in Paris. ALHashim has been making films since 2011 including 7 Hours, which won several awards at film festivals in 2013 and Breakfast in Beirut in 2015, which was honored at multiple festivals.

== Early life and education ==
Born in Kuwait and raised between Beirut, New York, London and Los Angeles, she holds a degree in journalism from Lebanese American University and a Master of Fine Arts (MFA) from New York Film Academy. Her parents are Kuwaiti columnist Fouad ALHashem and Lebanese journalist and writer Awatif Zain.

== Career ==
In 2013, while working as a diplomatic advisor for Kuwait Mission to the UN in New York, she made her first critically acclaimed short film 7 hours, which toured over 31 cities around the world as part of its award as "Best Arab Short Film" at the European Film Festival in Paris, 2014 for the Arab Category. The film was awarded twice more at the Santa Monica Film Festival in California with the "Best Acting" and "Best Screenplay" awards.

ALHashim has established her own film house, VioletSkye Films, in 2014 in Beirut. The company is registered in Lebanon as a production company dedicated only in creating content for web and cinema and she gives film courses remotely with CAP in Kuwait.

The official Avant Premiere of Breakfast in Beirut was held in 2015 at the Metropolis Sofil Theater in Beirut while the official international premiere was in Paris at Le Brady Cinema in April 2016. Breakfast in Beirut received an honorary recognition by the municipality of Treviso, Italy and in collaboration with the Gallery "Made In" Venice, Italy as they decided to name their art festival “Breakfast in Beirut Art Festival" in honor the film and ALHashem. She also released unedited footage, behind the scenes of the film under a web-series on YouTube entitled "Beirut Secrets" that follows the life of the filmmaker while living in Beirut. Breakfast in Beirut was banned at the Kuwait Film Festival.

In 2018, ALHashim released her second feature film "Ces Petits Riens", which tours International festivals during the fall of 2017 and she also released Women of Kuwait. ALHashem started her doctoral thesis at Jean Moulin University in Lyon on the films of Borhan Alaouie. She started shooting a documentary about Lebanese director Borhan Alaouie in Beirut which premiered in 2022.

In 2022 ALHashem released award-winning film "Beirut Borhan" which received the best film award in Jerusalem international film festival in Palestinian Territories. The film toured 8 countries in the Arab world and was named by ALJazeera documentary a "powerful film of 2022". ALHashem continuous to push boundaries in cinema and has created a wave of filmmakers who are copying ALHashem's style of filmmaking that is mixing fiction and documentary in a form of a personal narration.

== Filmography ==
Year	Title	Role	Notes
2011	Marilyn Monroe in New York	Writer, Director, Producer	Official Selection in Central Florida Film Festival
2012	La Fraise	Writer, Director, Producer	Premiered in Warner Brothers Studios 2012
2013	7hours	Writer, Director, Producer	Awarded "Best Arab Short Film" in ECU Film Festival Paris 2014 Awarded "Best Screenplay" in Santa Monica Film Festival 2013 Awarded "Best Acting" in Santa Monica Film Festival 2013 Official Selection Cabriolet Film Festival
2015	Breakfast in Beirut	Writer, Director, Producer, Cinematographer	Nominated Film of the Year - Lebanese Film Fest Australia 2015 Award Best Film - Ministry of Culture - Lebanon 2015 Special Mention - Alexandria international film fest - Egypt 2015 Breakfast in Beirut art festival - 2015-2016 Venice - A festival dedicated to honoring the film. 3 months screening continuously in Venice and Rome Premiered in Lebanon, Paris, Rome, and Egypt with full house nights.
2018	Ces Petits Riens, Little Nothings	Actress, Director, Producer	Official selection muscat international film festival 2018 Official selection Beirut women international film festival 2018 Official selection Austria film festival 2018 Official selection Vancouver filmdance film festival 2018.
2018	Women of Kuwait	Writer, Director, Producer	
2019	Le Cinquième Jour	Writer, Director, Producer	
2022	Beirut Borhan	Writer, Director, Producer	
2024	You Me and the Sea	Writer, Director, Producer	

== Awards and nominations ==
- 2013 7hours (short film): "Best Screenplay" and "Best Actress" at the Women Independent Film Festival Santa Monica in Los Angeles, CA
- 2014 7hours (short film): Official Selection on ECU world Tour at Cannes Short Corner; Official Selection at International Arts Expo, Italy; Official selection at the Cabriolet Film Festival; Official selection at the OnceaweekFilmFestival; "Best Short Film" at the European Independent Film Festival in Paris, France in the Arab World Section
- 2014 Breakfast in Beirut: Official Preview at Metropolis Sofil Theatre (sold out); Honorable Award for Breakfast in Beirut by the Ministry of Culture, Beirut
- 2015 Breakfast in Beirut: "Special Mention from the Jury" section in Nour Sherif for Feature Films at Alexandria and Mediterranean Countries Film Festival, Egypt; "Special Honorable Screening" at Made in. Art Gallery in Venice, Italy; Honorary show at Antoine University, Lebanon; Nominated "Film of the Year" at the Lebanese Film Festival in Sydney, Australia; Among the top five films representing Beirut in the movies according to LAHA Magazine
- 2016 Breakfast in Beirut: Official selection at the International Film Festival Lumiere, Rome; Art Festival in Venice, organized by Made in Gallery and the Municipality of Treviso as an honorable tribute; Official selection at CultFest in Mastre, Italy; Official selection at the Okaz Cultural Art Festival; Official premiere in Paris at the Cinema Le Brady (full house)
- 2018 Ces Petits Riens, Little Nothings: BBC Arabic film of the year
- 2019 Ces Petits Riens, Little Nothings: Official selection at Beirut Women Independent Film Festival
- 2020 The Fifth Day: Official selection at Beirut Women Independent Film Festival; Official selection at the Kuwait International Film Festival
- 2020 Confined to Paris: Official selection at the Beirut DC film festival in Beirut and in collaboration with the French Institute of Lebanon
- 2021The Fifth Day: Official selection at the Jerusalem International Film Festival and winner of the Jury Prize in the Palestinian Territories
- 2022 Beirut Borhan: Festival and winner of the Best Film in the Palestinian Territories
