= Abdullah Al-Wazzan =

Kuwaiti filmmaker

- Born: Kuwait City, Kuwait
- Other name: Abdullah Alwazzan
- Education: (B.Arch)
- Occupations: Film director; film producer; screenwriter; entrepreneur; architect
- Years active: 2013–present
- Notable work: Falafel Cart (2019)
- Awards: Winner - Burbank International Film Festival 2021; Honorable Mention - Hiroshima International Animation Festival 2020; Winner - Los Angeles Animation Festival 2019
- Website: abdullahalwazzan.com

Abdullah Al-Wazzan (Arabic: عبدالله الوزان) is a Kuwaiti filmmaker, entrepreneur and Architect. He was born in Kuwait City, Kuwait.

== Early life and background ==
Al-Wazzan was born and raised within the Al-Wazzan family, a prominent merchant family in Kuwait. his origins trace back to the Najd region of the Arabian peninsula. Al-Wazzan developed a keen interest in movies and filmmaking at a very young age. In his early preteens (ages 8–12) he created many unreleased short films. At the age of 17 he studied Architecture, earning him a Bachelor of Architecture in 2012.

== Film career ==
In 2010 Al-Wazzan created the short animated sci-fi film "Down from Above", It was his first film to play in theaters. Al-Wazzan went on to create the animated short film Falafel Cart (2019) which was officially submitted to the 92nd Academy Awards in the animated short film category making it the first short film from Kuwait to ever be submitted to the Academy Awards.

In 2020, Falafel Cart by Abdullah Al-Wazzan became Kuwait's first film to be officially selected at the prestigious Hiroshima International Animation Festival in Japan where it received a "Best of the World" honorable mention. Al-Wazzan won best international short film at the 2019 Los Angeles Animation Festival and In 2021 he won best animated short film at the Burbank International Film Festival in California, United States.

Al-Wazzan received nominations for his film Falafel Cart at D.C. Independent Film Festival in Washington, D.C., Palm Springs International Animation Festival in California, Southampton International Film Festival in the United Kingdom, Paris International Animation Film Festival in France, and Ajyal Film Festival in Doha And was officially selected at Athens Animfest in Greece, Sonoma International Film Festival in California, Rabat International Author Film Festival in Morocco and Montreal International Animation Film Festival in Canada. The film also screened theatrically in Los Angeles, Sweden and Kuwait.

In May 2017 During the Cannes Film Festival, the Doha Film Institute announced that Abdullah Al-Wazzan's drama, thriller script "Soaring over Mayhem" was selected to receive its annual film grant.

In 2014 Al-Wazzan participated officially at the 2014 Cannes Film Festival and at the Dubai International Film Festival.

In 2021 ShortsTV obtained non exclusive distribution rights to Al-Wazzan's film Falafel Cart for release on its live channels and streaming platforms.

== Filmography ==
Year	Title	Director	Writer	Producer	Animator	Notes
2010	Down from Above	Yes	Yes	Yes	Yes	Short animated film
2019	Falafel Cart	Yes	Yes	Yes	Yes	Short animated film
TBA	Soaring over Mayhem	Yes	Yes	Yes		Short live action film

== Awards & Accolades ==
Abdullah Al-Wazzan received the following awards and nominations:

List of awards and accolades received by Abdullah Al-Wazzan
Year	Film	Event	Award	Country	Result
2019	Falafel Cart	Los Angeles Animation Festival	Best International Short Film	United States	Won
2020	Falafel Cart	Hiroshima International Animation Festival	Best of the World	Japan	Honorable Mention
2021	Falafel Cart	Burbank International Film Festival	Best Animated Short Film	United States	Won
2019	Falafel Cart	Palm Springs International Animation Festival	In Competition Best Animated Short	United States	Nominated
2020	Falafel Cart	DC Independent Film Festival	Short Animation Finalist	United States	Nominated
2020	Falafel Cart	Southampton International Film Festival	Best Animated Short Film	United Kingdom	Nominated
2020	Falafel Cart	Southampton International Film Festival	Best Director of an Animated Film	United Kingdom	Nominated
2020	Falafel Cart	Ajyal Film Festival	Hilal Short Film Competition	Qatar	Nominated
2021	Falafel Cart	Paris International Animation Film Festival	Horizons Competition	France	Nominated
