= Honami Yano =

Japanese animation director

Honami Yano (矢野ほなみ, Yano Honami, born 1991) is a Japanese animation director. Her honors include the Ottawa International Animation Festival's Grand Prize for Short Animation and a New Face Award from the Japan Media Arts Festival, both for her 2021 short A Bite of Bone. Yano created the ending animation for the television series Trigun Stampede in 2023, and her short film Eri was selected for the Directors' Fortnight at the Cannes Film Festival in 2026.

== Biography ==
After undergraduate studies in Kyoto that included an exchange at the Rhode Island School of Design, Yano trained under Kōji Yamamura at Tokyo University of the Arts' Graduate School of Film and New Media. Her thesis film, Chromosome Sweetheart (2017), received nominations at Frameline and other festivals. In 2021, she joined Nagoya University as a Designated Assistant Professor within the Institutes of Innovation for Future Society. Her work frequently addresses questions of gender and sexuality, and she has curated screenings devoted to queer animation.

Yano's early short film was A Wild Pants Chase (パンツをめぐる冒険, 2014).

Running 9 minutes and 45 seconds, her 2021 short film A Bite of Bone (骨噛み, Honekami) shows a girl at her father's funeral looking back on the final summer the two spent together. The film was produced by Kōji Yamamura and Sunae as the inaugural production of the studio Au Praxinoscope. A Bite of Bone won the Grand Prize for Short Animation at the 45th Ottawa International Animation Festival (OIAF) in 2021, the New Face Award in the Animation Division of the 25th Japan Media Arts Festival, the Best Short Animation award at the 29th Raindance Film Festival, and the Gold Award (Animation category) at the 27th ifva Awards, among other festival honors. The festival jury commended the film for combining "traditional techniques" with a dot-based visual style that allows the audience to "freely cross places and memories."

In 2023, Yano created the ending animation for the television anime Trigun Stampede.

In 2026, her new short film Eri (also known as Eri, the Cow) was selected for the Directors' Fortnight (Quinzaine des Cinéastes) at the Cannes Film Festival. The film is set in a world where cows that do not bear calves cannot remain, and follows a Holstein cow who falls in love with another female.

== Filmography ==
- A Wild Pants Chase (パンツをめぐる冒険) (2014)
- Chromosome Sweetheart (2017)
- A Bite of Bone (骨噛み, Honekami) (2021) – Grand Prize for Short Animation at Ottawa International Animation Festival; New Face Award (Animation) at Japan Media Arts Festival; Best Short Animation at Raindance Film Festival; Gold Award (Animation) at ifva Awards
- Trigun Stampede (2023) – ending animation
- Eri (2026) – Selected for Directors' Fortnight at Cannes Film Festival
