= The Wedding of Zein (film) =

1976 film

- Directed by: Khalid Al Siddiq
- Written by: Tayeb Salih; Khaled Al Siddiq
- Starring: Ali Mahdi
- Release date: 1976
- Running time: 90 minutes
- Country: Kuwait
- Language: Arabic

The Wedding of Zein (Arabic: عرس الزين, translit. Urs Al-Zayn) is a 1976 Kuwaiti drama film directed by Khalid Al Siddiq. It is based on the novel of the same name by Sudanese writer Tayeb Salih. The film was selected as the Kuwaiti entry for the Best Foreign Language Film at the 51st Academy Awards, but was not accepted as a nominee.

== Cast ==
- Ali Mahdi as Zein
- Sunni Dafallah
- Ibrahim Hujazi as Haneen
- Mohamed Khairi
- Soraya Roro
- Awad Siddig
- Tahiya Zaroug as Nama

== See also ==
- List of submissions to the 51st Academy Awards for Best Foreign Language Film
- List of Kuwaiti submissions for the Academy Award for Best Foreign Language Film
