= Falafel Cart =

2019 animated short film

- Film poster
- Directed by: Abdullah Al-Wazzan
- Written by: Abdullah Al-Wazzan
- Music by: Dan Phillipson
- Animation by: Abdullah Al-Wazzan
- Color process: Color
- Production company: RoyalTales
- Distributed by: RoyalTales
- Release date: September 13, 2019
- Running time: 14 minutes
- Country: Kuwait
- Language: English

Falafel Cart is a 2019 animated short drama film produced by RoyalTales and directed by Abdullah Al-Wazzan with an original score by Dan Phillipson and sound design by Andrew Vernon. The short blends stop motion animation with traditional and some computer animation. In 2019, the film was submitted for the 2020 Academy Award for Best Animated Short Film making it Kuwait's first short film to ever be submitted to the Academy Awards.

In 2020, the film earned an official selection at the Hiroshima International Animation Festival and received a special mention as "best of the world". In 2021, the film won best animated short at the Burbank International Film Festival. In 2019, the film won best international short film at the Los Angeles Animation Festival.

== Plot ==
During a stormy night, an immigrant falafel vendor who lives in his cart in the middle of nowhere stumbles upon a mysterious flower. The extraordinary encounter sparks something within him and eventually makes him relive scenes from his past life.

== Production ==
The film was inspired by the ongoing conflicts in the Middle East, highlighting the impact on people who are merely seeking a better life. The theme of the falafel, a typical food of the Levant, represents the notion of home and serves as a symbolic reminder that reconnects the main character with his far-away home. The project first came to life after Al-Wazzan started to experiment with a different form of animation that employed a combination of stop-motion, computer generated animation, claymation and traditional animation. The filmmaker animated the film, built and painted hundreds of models, puppets, and backgrounds in a span of three years.

== Release ==
Falafel Cart first premiered theatrically in Los Angeles, California on September 13, 2019. In 2021 ShortsTV obtained non exclusive distribution rights to the film for release on its live channels and streaming platforms. On September 11, 2021, the film screened at AMC Theatres in Burbank as part of the Burbank International Film Festival.

List of release dates and screenings for Falafel Cart
Release date	Country	Event	Notes
13 September 2019	United States	Theatrical release	World Premier
8 December 2019	United States	Los Angeles Animation Festival	
14 December 2019	United States	Palm Springs International Animation Festival	
March 2020	Greece	Athens Animfest	
4 March 2020	United States	DC Independent Film Festival	
30 July 2020	United States	Sonoma International Film Festival	
2 August 2020	United Kingdom	The Animator Showcase	
13 August 2020	United States	Hollyshorts	
20 August 2020	Japan	Hiroshima International Animation Festival	
15 October 2020	United Kingdom	Southampton International Film Festival	
23 October 2020	Morocco	Rabat International Author Film Festival	
18 November 2020	Canada	Animaze Montreal International Film Festival	
18 November 2020	Qatar	Ajyal Film Festival	
3 July 2021	France	Paris International Animation Film Festival	
9 September 2021	United States	Burbank International Film Festival	
7 April 2022	Kuwait	Limited theatrical release	
21 December 2022	Sweden	Limited	

In 2014, A different concept version of Falafel Cart participated at the 67th Cannes Film Festival, was officially selected at the 11th Dubai International Film Festival and was nominated at the International Children's Film Festival in the UAE. This early version was re-worked as a new project to become the final 2019 animated film.

== Awards & Accolades ==
The film received the following awards and nominations:

List of accolades received by Falafel Cart
Year	Country	Event	Category	Recipients and nominees	Result
2019	United States	Palm Springs International Animation Festival	In Competition Best Animated Short	Abdullah Al-Wazzan	Nominated
2019	United States	Los Angeles Animation Festival	Best International Short Film	Abdullah Al-Wazzan	Won
2020	United States	DC Independent Film Festival	Short Animation Finalist	Abdullah Al-Wazzan	Nominated
2020	United Kingdom	Southampton International Film Festival	Best Animated Short Film	Abdullah Al-Wazzan	Nominated
2020	United Kingdom	Southampton International Film Festival	Best Director of an Animated Film	Abdullah Al-Wazzan	Nominated
2020	Japan	Hiroshima International Animation Festival	Best of the World	Abdullah Al-Wazzan	Honorable Mention
2020	Qatar	Ajyal Film Festival	Hilal Short Film Competition	Abdullah Al-Wazzan	Nominated
2021	France	Paris International Animation Film Festival	Horizons Competition	Abdullah Al-Wazzan	Nominated
2021	United States	Burbank International Film Festival	Best Animated Short	Abdullah Al-Wazzan	Won
