= The Cruel Sea (1972 film) =

1972 film

- Directed by: Khaled Al Siddiq
- Written by: Khaled Al Siddiq
- Starring: Mohammed Al-Mansour
- Cinematography: Tewfik El-Amir
- Release date: 1972
- Running time: 106 minutes
- Country: Kuwait
- Language: Arabic

The Cruel Sea (Arabic: بس يابحر, translit. Bas Ya Bahar) is an Arabic-language 1972 Kuwaiti drama film written directed by Khaled Al Siddiq. It was the first Kuwaiti film to be produced and focuses on the very challenging existence for most people before the discovery of oil in Kuwait. The film was selected as the Kuwaiti entry for the Best Foreign Language Film at the 45th Academy Awards, but was not accepted as a nominee.

== Cast ==
- Mohammed Al-Mansour as Moussaed
- Amal Bakr as Nura
- Saad Al Faraj as Father
- Hayat El-Fahad as Mother

== See also ==
- Cinema of Kuwait
- List of submissions to the 45th Academy Awards for Best Foreign Language Film
- List of Kuwaiti submissions for the Academy Award for Best Foreign Language Film
