= From Sudan to Argentina =

- Promotional release poster
- Directed by: Ricardo Preve
- Written by: Ricardo Preve
- Cinematography: Leonardo Val
- Music by: Andrés Rubinsztejn
- Production companies: Ricardo Preve Films; Esto del Cine SRL; Sudan Film Factory
- Release date: 2022
- Running time: 52 minutes
- Countries: Argentina; Sudan
- Languages: Spanish; Arabic

From Sudan to Argentina (Spanish: De la Nubia a La Plata) is a 2022 Argentine-Sudanese documentary film written and directed by Ricardo Preve. The feature documentary tells the story of the Argentine historian and Egyptologist, Abraham Rosenvasser, as leader of the French-Argentine archeology mission promoted by UNESCO, and which took place in the north of Sudan between 1961 and 1963. The film was shown in various international film festivals, and earned several awards and nominations.

== Synopsis ==
Between 1961 and 1963, Argentine Egyptologist Abraham Rosenvasser organized an archaeological expedition to Sudan in collaboration with Jean Vercoutter, a renowned French archaeologist. The objective of the mission was to excavate the Temple of Aksha, an important site of the culture of Pharaoh Ramesses II located on the banks of the Nile, adjacent to the Egyptian border, before the construction of a dam by the Egyptian government destroyed the temple under the waters of the future Lake Nasser.

After the first joint campaign in 1961, the French withdrew from the project, and Rosenvasser had to complete the work on his own. He managed to rescue the treasures of the Temple of Aksha from the rising waters of the Nile, and to bring the part that corresponded to Argentina to the Museum of La Plata, where they are exhibited.

== Background, production and release ==
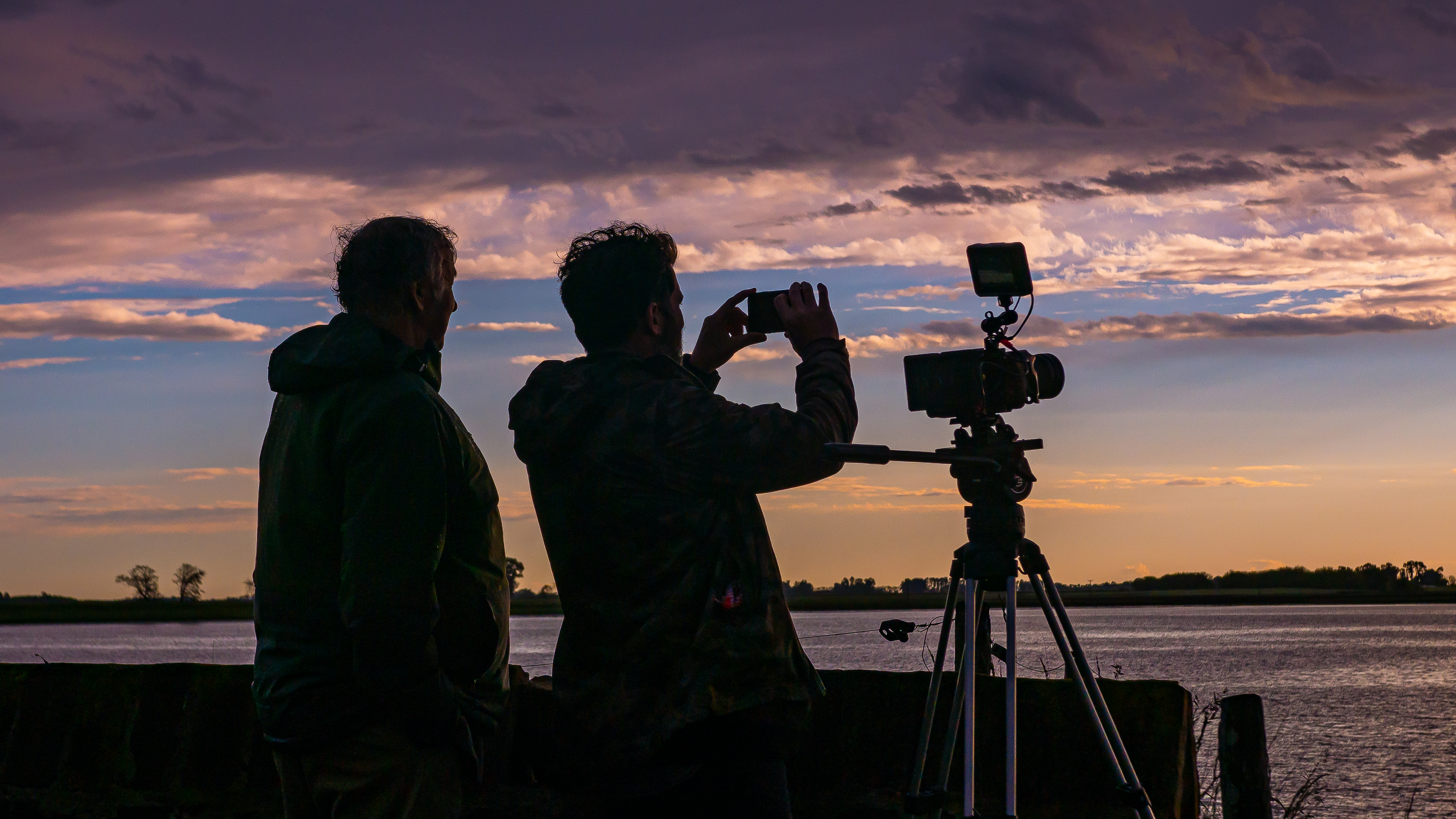
Backstage of the film in Argentina, 2021.

In 2017, Ricardo Preve was in Sudan working on his feature documentary Coming Home. Talking to Sudanese filmmakers, he heard for the first time mentions about the French-Argentine mission to Nubia, in northern Sudan. Upon his return to Argentina, the director contacted leading anthropologists and Egyptologists in the country, to discover more about this mission which appeared to be largely unknown to the majority of Argentine society. In this way, Preve became aware of the story of Dr. Abraham Rosenvasser, an intellectual and historian who led the mission in the years 1961–1963. After researching the story further, Ricardo Preve contacted the daughter of Dr. Rosenvasser, Elsa Rosenvasser Feher, a Scientist who lived in La Jolla, California. Together, they agreed that the trip of her father, and the story of the French-Argentine mission to save hundreds of treasures, merited being narrated in this film.

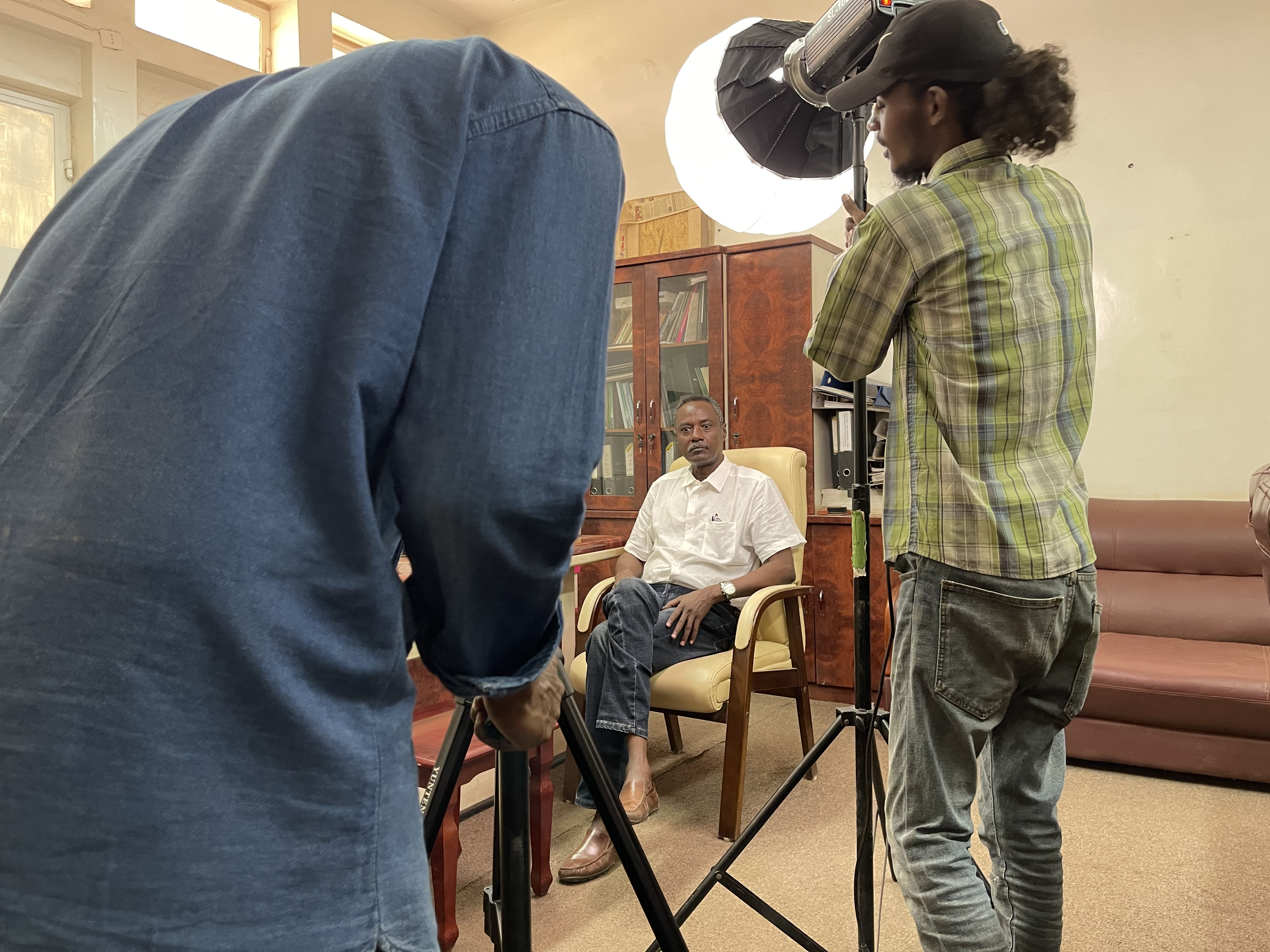
Second unit shooting in Sudan.

Principal photography of From Sudan to Argentina began in May, 2021 in La Jolla. In August of that year, the production team returned to Argentina to continue filming in the town of Carlos Casares, Buenos Aires Province (birthplace of Dr. Rosenvasser), and at the La Plata Museum (where the recovered treasures are currently exhibited). Also, shooting included a second unit in Sudan, under the direction of Sudanese filmmaker Talal Afifi, in October, 2021. Editing and post-production of the documentary began at the end of 2021, and was completed in early 2022.

During that year, the film was an official selection in several film festivals around the world, like the Virginia Film Festival in the United States, Fusion International Film Festival in Europe, earning awards and mentions such as Best Director and Best Photography. This reception encouraged Preve to undertake a tour with the film in Europe and Africa, presenting the documentary in countries including Morocco, Algeria and Tunisia, and competing in festivals such as the International Arab-African Documentary Film Festival in Morocco, where it won the Best Documentary award.

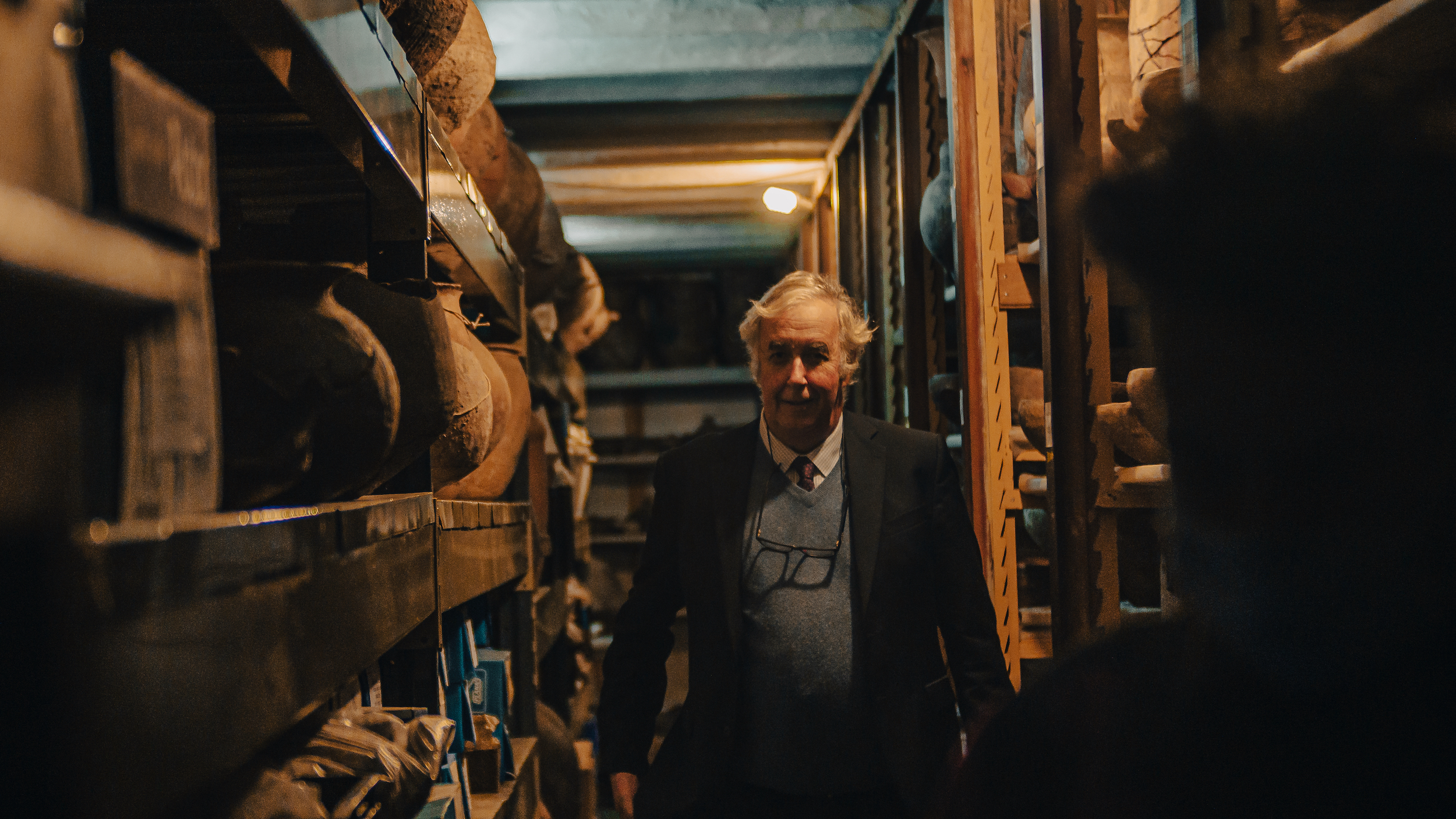
Ricardo Preve in La Plata Museum.

Finally, the film was released in theaters in Argentina with the premiere being at the Cosmos cinema in Buenos Aires on November 3, 2022; followed by screenings at the Frey cinema in the Bariloche Civic Center in Rio Negro Province, as part of the series Vidas inolvidables, and in the Pablo Ducros Hicken Cinema Museum in the city of Buenos Aires.

On July 9, 2026, the Chinese international network CGTN broadcast it as part of an initiative by China Media Group to promote cultural exchange among countries of the Global South. The film was broadcast on CGTN's documentary channel, on the network's Spanish and Arabic channels, and on its official YouTube, Facebook, and X accounts.

== Reception ==
From Sudan to Argentina was well received by critics and film professionals. Gonzalo Sanchez of Clarín newspaper stated that it is "a classic documentary" and that it "thoroughly investigates the story to construct an insightful documentary". Juan Barberis of La Nación newspaper describes the film as "brilliant", and states that "the documentary research serves to give Rosenvasser, who for the first time will be recognized with a dedicated exhibition, a higher profile".

Catalina Dlugi, General Editor of the cinema site El portal de Catalina, states that it is a "very interesting documentary" and that "it not only has the moving remembrances of his daughter, students, and colleagues, but also the voice of this unique man, with no shortage of ironies about jealousies and bureaucratic obstacles that tried in vain to harm him". The culture magazine BeCult wrote that "it is not another typical documentary", and that "Preve's lucid viewpoint is evident in this film".

The film was part of a series of tributes towards the legacy of Dr. Abraham Rosenvasser, which concluded with the unveiling of a plaque in his honor, as a leading Argentine Historian and Egyptologist. Currently, the plaque is in the Egyptian hall of the La Plata Museum. The film was screened at the Nacional Fine Arts Museum of Buenos Aires as part of the exhibition Science and Fantasy: Egyptology and Eyptian fascination in Argentina in November, 2025.

== Awards and nominations ==
Year	Event	Category	Result
2022	Virginia Film Festival, United States	Official Selection	Nominated
2022	Festival LatinUy, Uruguay	Audience Award for Best Film	Nominated
2022	Festival LatinUy, Uruguay	Best Documentary	Nominated
2022	International Arab-African Documentary Film Festival, Morocco	Best Documentary	Won
2022	Fusion International Film Festival, England	Best Director in a Feature Documentary	Won
2022	Fusion International Film Festival, England	Best Cinematography in a Documentary	Won
2022	Fusion International Film Festival, England	Best Feature Documentary	Nominated
2022	Fusion International Film Festival, England	Best Original Music	Nominated
2022	Fusion International Film Festival, England	Best History	Nominated
2022	Fusion International Film Festival, England	Best Scientific and Educational Film	Nominated
2023	Out of Africa International Film Festival, Kenya	Official Selection	Nominated
2023	International Hispanic Film Festival, Delaware, United States	Cinematography	Won
2023	International Hispanic Film Festival, Delaware, United States	Sound Editing	Won
2023	International Hispanic Film Festival, Delaware, United States	Original Script	Won
2023	International Hispanic Film Festival, Delaware, United States	Original Concept	Won
2023	Ismailia International Film Festival for Documentaries and Short Films, Egypt	Official Selection	Nominated
2023	History, Arts and Sciences International Doc Fest, Athens	Best Archeological Documentary	Won
