= Italian submarine Macallé =

Italian submarine

Coordinates: 19°12′0″N 38°09′0″E

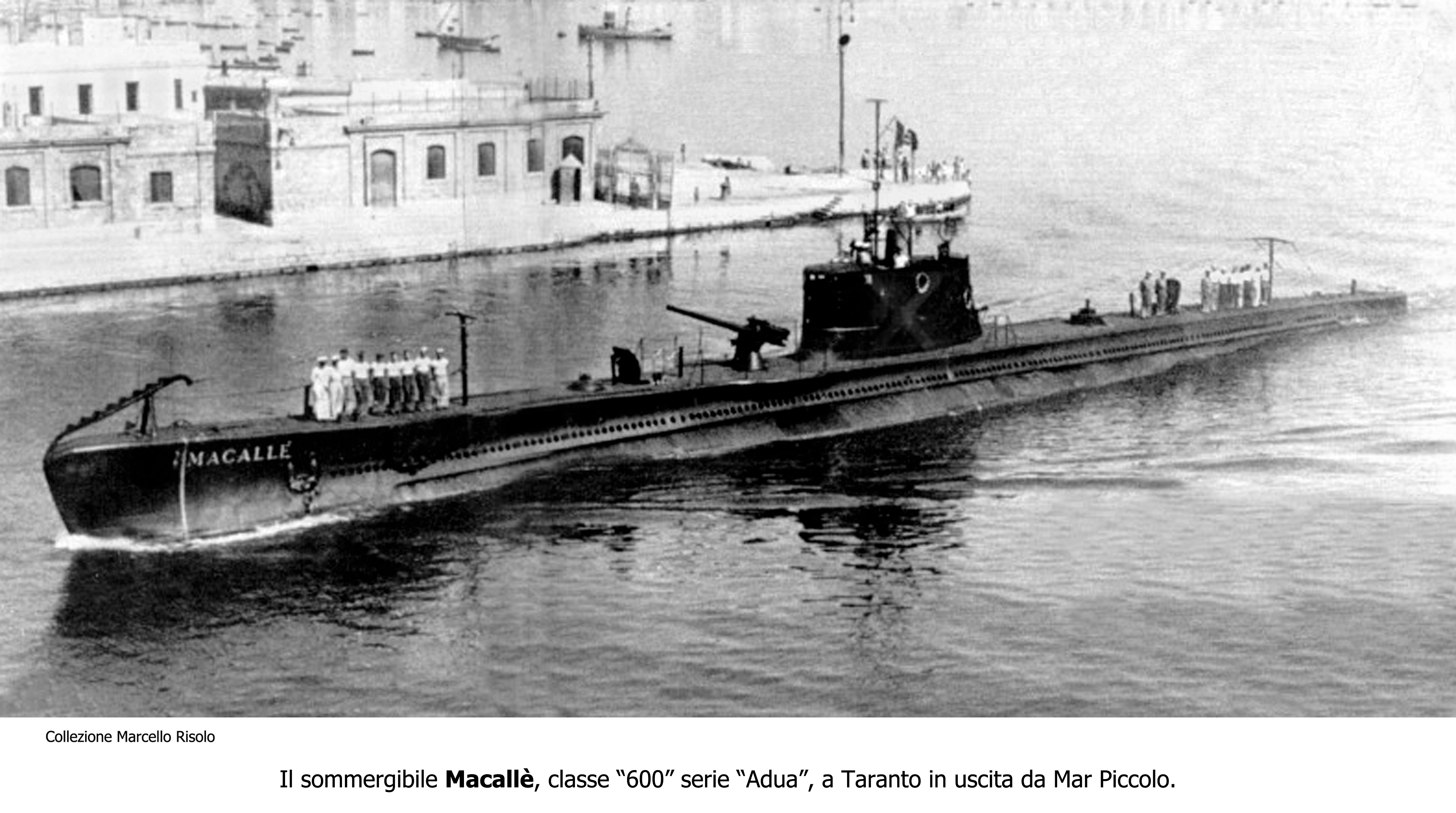
- RIN Macalle

History

Kingdom of Italy
- Name: Macallé
- Namesake: Mek'ele
- Builder: OTO
- Laid down: 1 March 1936
- Launched: 29 October 1936
- Commissioned: 1 March 1937
- Fate: Wrecked and sank 15 June 1940

General characteristics
- Class & type: 600-Serie Adua-class submarine
- Displacement: 680 long tons (691 t) surfaced; 844 long tons (858 t) submerged
- Length: 60.18 m (197 ft 5 in)
- Beam: 6.45 m (21 ft 2 in)
- Draft: 4.7 m (15 ft 5 in)
- Installed power: 1,200 bhp (890 kW) (diesels); 800 hp (600 kW) (electric motors)
- Propulsion: Diesel-electric; 2 × FIAT diesel engines; 2 × Marelli electric motors
- Speed: 14 knots (26 km/h; 16 mph) surfaced; 7.5 knots (13.9 km/h; 8.6 mph) submerged
- Range: 3,180 nmi (5,890 km; 3,660 mi) at 10.5 knots (19.4 km/h; 12.1 mph) surfaced; 74 nmi (137 km; 85 mi) at 4 knots (7.4 km/h; 4.6 mph) submerged
- Test depth: 80 m (260 ft)
- Complement: 44 (4 officers + 40 non-officers and sailors)
- Armament: 6 × 533 mm (21 in) torpedo tubes (4 bow, 2 stern); 1 × 100 mm (4 in) / 47 caliber deck gun; 2 x 1 - 13.2 mm (0.52 in) anti-aircraft guns

Italian submarine Macallé was an Adua-class submarine built for the Royal Italian Navy (Regia Marina) during the 1930s. It was named after a town of Mek'ele in Ethiopia.

== Design and description ==
The Adua-class submarines were an evolution of the preceding Perla class. They displaced 680 long tons (690 t) surfaced and 844 long tons (858 t) submerged. The submarines were 60.18 meters (197 ft 5 in) long, had a beam of 6.45 meters (21 ft 2 in) and a draft of 4.7 meters (15 ft 5 in).

For surface running, the boats were powered by two 600-brake-horsepower (447 kW) diesel engines, each driving one propeller shaft. When submerged each propeller was driven by a 400-horsepower (298 kW) electric motor. They could reach 14 knots (26 km/h; 16 mph) on the surface and 7.5 knots (13.9 km/h; 8.6 mph) underwater. On the surface, the Adua class had a range of 3,180 nautical miles (5,890 km; 3,660 mi) at 10.5 knots (19.4 km/h; 12.1 mph), submerged, they had a range of 74 nmi (137 km; 85 mi) at 4 knots (7.4 km/h; 4.6 mph).

The boats were armed with six internal 53.3 cm (21.0 in) torpedo tubes, four in the bow and two in the stern. They were also armed with one 100 mm (4 in) deck gun for combat on the surface. The light anti-aircraft armament consisted of one or two pairs of 13.2 mm (0.52 in) machine guns.

== Construction and career ==
Macallé was launched on 29 October 1936 in OTO's shipyard in La Spezia and commissioned on 1 March 1937. On April 20, 1937, Macallé was assigned to the 23rd Squadron based out of Naples. After undergoing a brief training, from 27 August through 3 September 1937, she carried a special mission in connection with the operations of the Spanish Civil War. In 1938 she was reassigned to La Spezia and in 1940, in view of her limited usage, was moved to Massawa and became part of the 82nd Squadron (VIII Submarine Group) of the Red Sea Flotilla. On June 10, 1940, in the afternoon, she left Massawa under command of captain Dante Morone to begin her first war mission to operate in an area about eight miles east of Port Sudan.

It was cloudy and foggy, and this made it virtually impossible for the submarine to use Celestial navigation. It was also difficult to identify the reference points along the shoreline, and that presented a bigger danger since the area Macallé had to cross was littered with islets, sandbanks, reefs and rock outcrops. Also, on June 12 the air conditioning system developed a leak of chloromethane, but the problem was not immediately recognized. After checking the system and not finding any obvious leaks, it was thought that the symptoms were caused by food poisoning. As corrective measures were not taken, on June 14, 1940, all officers and almost all crew developed symptoms of chloromethane poisoning, including some cases of hallucinations.

On June 14, at dawn, a lighthouse was spotted and thought to be Sanganeb Reef Lighthouse, but it was actually Hindi Gider Lighthouse, located about thirty miles further. This misidentification led the crew to believe the submarine was in deeper waters, while Macallé was still moving through a dangerous area. At 02:35 on June 15, Macallé ran aground on the island of Bar Musa Chebir, southeast of Port Sudan. The submarine ended up leaning about 60° on the left, with her bow completely out of the water and the stern still submerged. The crew managed to move necessary materials and food onshore and destroy all codes and secret documents. The submarine remained on the rocks for a few hours but then slipped stern first into the water and sank. However, in the confusion and probably still being poisoned by chloromethane the crew failed to inform Massawa about their fate and position. As a result, the submarine crew found itself on an isolated island with scarce supplies and without the base knowing their position, and the fact that Macallé sank.

Since it would be impossible to survive for a long time on a deserted island, and not willing to surrender to the British, it was decided to send out a volunteer party to try to reach an Italian outpost on the coast of Eritrea. In the evening of June 15, three men, Elio Sandroni, Torchia and Costagliola Paolo left on a small sailboat. On June 17 they arrived on the coast of Sudan, but since it was British territory, they had to continue. On June 20, 1940 they finally reached the lighthouse of Taclai, in Eritrea, and alerted Massawa's command.

An airplane (SM-81) was sent from Massawa and dropped off some food on the island at around 8:00 on June 22, 1940. At the same time submarine Guglielmotti was sent from the base, and on June 22, 1940 around noon Guglielmotti rescued the crew of Macallé. A British seaplane landed near the island shortly after, but Guglielmotti was already submerged and on her way back to Massawa.

Unfortunately, one of the crew members, Carlo Acefalo, who was severely poisoned, died on the island on June 17 and was buried there. Elio Sandroni received Silver Medal of Military Valor.

== Documentary ==
Ricardo Preve, an Argentine documentary film director, conducted several expeditions to the island in the 2010s. In one of them he found some pieces of the wreck of the Macallé and decided to undertake the search for the remains of Carlo Acefalo, which were found in 2017 and transferred to Port Sudan for their repatriation. The remains were finally taken to the hometown of the sailor, a small italian village called Castiglione Falletto. The story of the recovery and return of the remains of Acefalo was the subject of the 2019 documentary Coming Home, directed by Preve.
