= Macallé =

Macallé may refer to:

- Mek'ele, capital city in the northern Tigray Region of Ethiopia
- Italian submarine Macallé
