= Seth Michelson =

American poet

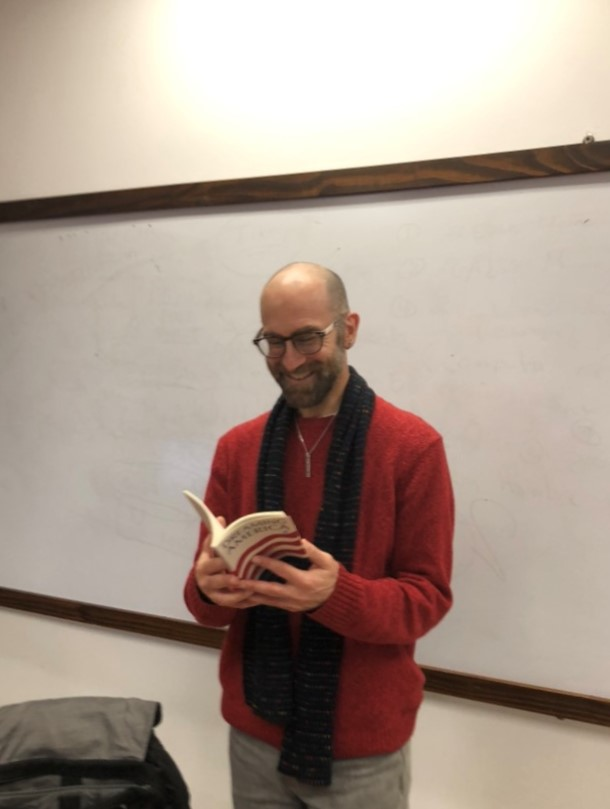
- Michelson in July 2022.
- Born: October 10, 1975 (age 50); Philadelphia, Pennsylvania
- Education: Johns Hopkins University, Sarah Lawrence College, University of Southern California
- Occupations: Professor, Founder of the Center for Poetic Research
- Writing career
- Genre: Poetry
- Notable works: Eyes Like Broken Windows (2012), Swimming Through Fire (2017), Dreaming America: Voices of Undocumented Youth in Maximum-Security Detention (2017), Women of the Big Sky (2020), Rengo (2022), The Sun of Always (2022)
- Notable awards: 2018 National Endowment for the Arts Fellowship, 2022 U.S. Fulbright Scholar
- Website: sethmichelson.com

Seth Michelson (born 1975), is an American poet, translator, and professor of poetry.

== Background ==
He received his B.A. from Johns Hopkins University, his MFA in poetry from Sarah Lawrence College, and his Ph.D. in Comparative Literature from University of Southern California.

== Poetry ==
He is the author of 23 volumes of original poetry, poetry in translation, and anthologies of poetry.

He has been credited with "seeking transformation through opposition", with his poems having "at their core an acknowledgement of love—a love of family, love of language and poetry, love of music and nature. And it is through love that perhaps we can find the strength to face the greatest fears that lie ahead."

His teaching, writing, and translations address injustice through compassion. This includes his translation of female poets and his work with incarcerated people. Of the latter, the scholar and critic Montse Feu writes, "Until Seth Michelson’s Dreaming America, though, no book had exclusively focused on the lives of the incarcerated children."

His most recent book of original poetry in English is Swimming Through Fire (2017), and it has been translated into Serbian as Plivanje kroz vatru (2020) by Vida Ognjenovic.

His most recent book of original poetry in Spanish is Rengo (2024), from internationally esteemed Valparaíso Ediciones.

His most recent book of poetry in translation is The Sun of Always (2022), and it is trilingual, featuring the poetry in Mapudungun, Spanish, and English.

== Dreaming America ==
Michelson compiled, edited, and translated the poetry for the anthology Dreaming America: Voices of Undocumented Youth in Maximum-Security Detention (2017). Those poems come from poetry workshops that he created and led across three years inside the most restrictive immigrant detention center in the US for undocumented, unaccompanied youth.

The book is widely acclaimed, receiving praise in academic and public venues. It is regularly taught in high schools and universities, and it has been featured nationally and internationally in the press in places as diverse as ABC News, NPR, BBC, and la diaria of Uruguay. Dreaming America also has been featured at book festivals around the world, and it has been turned into original plays and music. All proceeds from its sale go to a legal defense fund for incarcerated, undocumented youth.

== Hope on the Border: Immigration, Incarceration, and the Poetry of Poetry ==
Published in late 2025, the book pivots on Michelson's unprecedented and sustained access to some of the most restrictive and infamous detention centers in the United States, as well as his work in refugee camps in Mexico. In this manner Michelson faces the U.S. immigration crisis head on, learning and sharing the stories of migrating people fleeing violence and poverty, and suffering along the way in immigration detention centers across the US.

Michelson takes readers inside those detention centers, as well as inside his poetry workshops for minors held in a maximum-security juvenile immigration detention center. Highlighting the experiences of a diverse group of people desperate for safety, Michelson provides suggestions on how to work toward a more just U.S. immigration system.

Publishers Weekly calls the book "heartfelt" and “a surprisingly uplifting call to reform an unjust system.”

Michelson himself calls it “a non-partisan, extensively researched examination of immigration policies and practice...dating back to at least their inception as federal concern in 1875.”

Ultimately, the book offers a humanizing story of immigration shown through the lens of undocumented, unaccompanied children and adults.

== Sometime, Somewhere ==
Sometime, Somewhere is a 2023 film featuring Michelson. It highlights his work with undocumented migrant children who are incarcerated at maximum security prisons, where he teaches them poetry. The film closes with some final reflections from the participants in that work. He also comments throughout the film on the US immigration system and the many different refugees caught in it from around the world, and particularly Latin America.

== Boquete: poemas de personas libres ==
Published in 2023, this anthology features poetry by men in a men's prison in Uruguay, la Unidad N°6 del I.N.R. Therein Michelson led weekly poetry workshops throughout his time as a Fulbright scholar, creating a vibrant series of workshops that continues to run to this day with his collaboration. The initial project involved bringing students and faculty from Universidad Católica del Uruguay into the prison to write in partnership each week with incarcerated men under Michelson's guidance, and their collective work attracted widespread media attention.

== Translation ==
As a translator, Michelson focuses predominantly on poetry by women from Latin America. Thus, his books of poetry in translation include The Ghetto (2011; 2018) by the Argentine poet Tamara Kamenszain, The Red Song by the Uruguayan poet Melisa Machado, roly poly by the Uruguayan poet Victoria Estol, and Poems from the Disaster by the Argentine poet Zulema Moret.

He also earned a fellowship from the National Endowment for the Arts to translate poetry by the Mapuche poet Liliana Ancalao. That fellowship resulted in Women of the Big Sky (2020), the first-ever, single-author book of poetry by a female Mapuche writer from Argentina to appear in English-language translation. The book is in fact trilingual, featuring the poetry in Mapuzugun, Spanish, and English.

Outside of Latin America, Michelson has translated two books by the Indian poet Rati Saxena, Dreaming in Another Land (2014) and Scripted in the Streams (2017), and a book by the Israeli poet Amir Or, Wings (2018).

== Teaching ==
Michelson currently teaches at Washington and Lee University in Lexington, Virginia, where he founded and directs the Center for Poetic Research.

== Non-Fiction ==
- Hope on the Border: Immigration, Incarceration, and the Power of Poetry (2025) ISBN 978-1-640658-39-4

== Poetry ==
- Rengo (2024) ISBN 978-84-10073-08-1
- Rengo (2022) ISBN 978-9915-656-63-2
- Swimming through Fire (2017) ISBN 978-1-941209-51-6
- Eyes Like Broken Windows (2012) ISBN 978-1-935708-55-1
- House in a Hurricane (2010)
- Kaddish for My Unborn Son (2009)
- Maestro of Brutal Splendor (2005)

== Poetry in translation ==
- The Sun of Always by Liliana Ancalao, Puelmapu (2022) ISBN 978-1-7329363-9-3
- Women of the Big Sky by Liliana Ancalao, Puelmapu (2020) ISBN 978-1-944585-43-3
- The Ghetto by Tamara Kamenszain, Argentina (2018) ISBN 978-0-9969134-8-5
- Wings by Amir Or, Israel (2018) ISBN 978-1-944697-55-6
- The Red Song by Melisa Machado, Uruguay (2018) ISBN 978-0-900575-98-3
- Scripted in the Streams by Rati Saxena, India (2017)
- Poems from the Disaster by Zulema Moret, Argentina (2016) ISBN 978-84-7839-641-2
- roly poly by Victoria Estol, Uruguay (2014)
- Dreaming in Another Land by Rati Saxena, India (2014)
- El Ghetto/The Ghetto: A Bilingual Edition by Tamara Kamenszain, Argentina (2011) ISBN 0-9788231-6-8

== Anthologies ==
- Boquete: poemas de personas libres (2023) ISBN 978-9915-94-856-0
- Antología de Poesía Slam de Macedonia (2023), co-edited with Dr. Khedija Gadhoum ISBN 978-9942-45-053-1
- Dreaming America: Voices of Undocumented Youth in Maximum-Security Detention (2017) ISBN 978-0-9859468-9-0
