= Amir Or =

Israeli poet (born 1956)

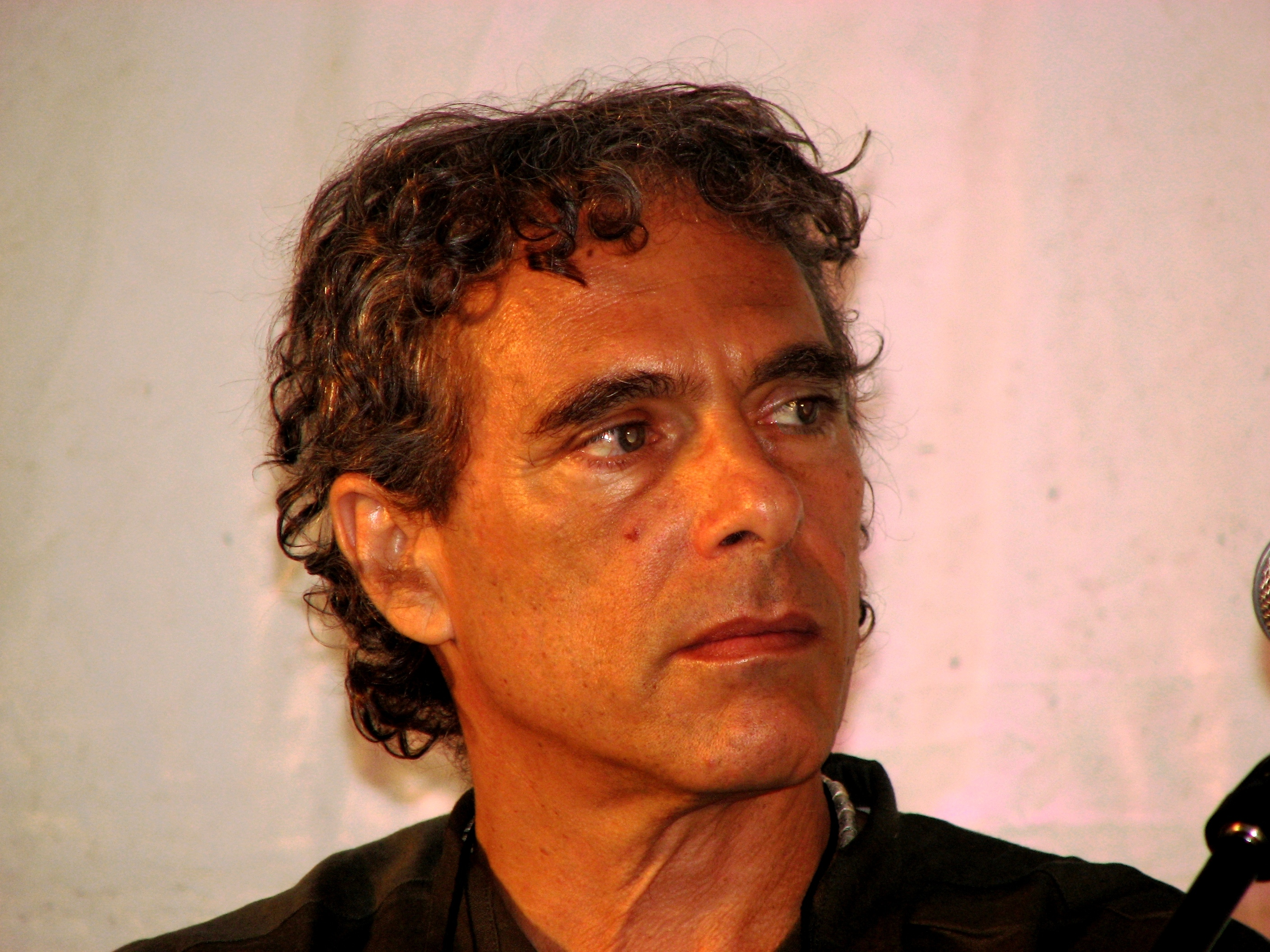
Amir Or, 2010

Amir Or (Hebrew: אמיר אור; born 1956), is an Israeli poet, novelist, and essayist whose works have been published in more than 50 languages.

He is the author of fourteen volumes of poetry. His most recent books in Hebrew are Loot (selected poems 1977–2013), Wings (2015), Child (2018) and Thirst (2025). Or also published a fictional epic in metered prose, The Song of Tahira (2001) and the novel The Kingdom (2015) about the life of king David and contemporary society.

== Biography ==
Amir Or was born in Tel Aviv. He has worked as a shepherd, builder and restaurateur. He studied philosophy and comparative religion at the Hebrew University of Jerusalem, where he later lectured on Ancient Greek Religion. Or has published essays on poetry, classics and comparative religion, and has taught creative writing in universities in Israel, Europe, USA and Japan.

== Literary career ==
In 1990 Or founded "Helicon Poetry Society" in Israel and has been Editor-in-Chief of Helicon's journal and series of poetry books. In 1993 he set up the Arabic-Hebrew Helicon Poetry School and has founded and directed the Sha’ar International Poetry Festival. Or has also edited other literary journals and several anthologies of Hebrew verse in European languages. He has served as editor of the Catuv poetry books series, as national editor of the international poetry magazines Atlas and Blesok, and as a national coordinator for the U.N. sponsored UPC venture, “Poets for Peace.” He is a founding memberof the EACWP (European Association of Creative Writing Programs) of the international Circle of Poets and of the WPM (World Poetry Movement). Or gave readings and lectured in poetry festivals and conferences worldwide.

== Awards and recognition ==
Or is the 2020 SPE Golden Wreath laureate. His other awards include the Hebrew University Harry Harshon award, the Levi Eshkol Prime Minister's award, the Bernstein Prize, the Fulbright Award for writers, the 2010 Oeneumi literary prize of the Tetovo Poetry Festival, the 2013 Wine Poetry prize of the Struga Poetry Evenings, the 2014 Stefan Mirtov Ljubiša international literary award, the 2016 European Atlas of Lyrics award, the 2017 BlueMet World Through Poetry award, Montreal, Canada, the 2019 Homer European Medal of Poetry and Art, Brussels, the 2020 ACUM Directorate prize, the 2021 Wladislaw Reimont and Ianicius awards, Poland, "for his contribution to world poetry", the 2022 Shabdha Guchha award, NY, USA, and the 2026 Orpheus prize, Plovdiv, Bulgaria; as well as Fellowships at the University of Iowa, the Jewish-Hebrew Centre of the University of Oxford, the Heinrich Böll Foundation and the Literarische Colloquium, Berlin among others. For his translations he was awarded the 1995 Honorary Prize of the Israeli Minister of Culture and for his editorial work - the 2017 literary editing award of the Israeli Minister of Culture .

== Published works ==
Or published 15 poetry books, 2 novels, a book of essays and 12 books of his translations to Hebrew. His latest books: 'Thirst', mostly spoken by female characters, is an existential parable that tells the story of the soul's journey in countless ways of disorientation and distance, longing, passion and devotion. 'Abandon all hope: be': A celebration of bodily and spiritual yearning, an encounter with the wisdom-consciousness of antiquity, and a longing that transcends cultures, His work was translated to more than 50 languages and published in 48 books in Europe, America and Asia.

=== Hebrew books ===
- Z’nach Kol Tikva: Heye (Abandon All Hope:Be), Ha-kibbutz Ha-meuchad, 2026
- Tsama (Thirst), Ha-kibbutz Ha-meuchad, 2024
- Yeled (Child), Ha-kibbutz Ha-meuchad, 2018
- Al Ha-derekh (On The Road), Pardes, 2018
- Sikha (Discourse), Selected Essays, Ha-kibbutz Ha-meuchad, 2018
- HaMamlakha (The Kingdom), Novel, Ha-kibbutz Ha-meuchad, 2015
- Knafayim (Wings), Ha-kibbutz Ha-meuchad, 2015
- Shalal (Loot) Selected poems 1977–2013, Ha-kibbutz Ha-meuchad, 2013
- Masa HaMeshuga (The Madman's Prophecy), Keshev, 2012
- HaHaya SheBalev (The Animal in the Heart). Keshev, 2010
- Muzeion Hazman (The Museum of Time). Ha-kibbutz Ha-meuchad, 2007
- Shir Tahira (The Song of Tahira). Novel, Xargol, 2001.
- Yom (Day). Ha-kibbutz Ha-meuchad & Tag, 1998.
- Shir (Poem). Ha-kibbutz Ha-meuchad, 1996.
- Kakha (So!). Ha-kibbutz Ha-meuchad, 1995.
- Pidyon ha-met. (Ransoming The Dead), Helicon-Bitan, 1994.
- Panim (Faces). Am Oved, 1991.
- Ani mabbit me-‛eyney ha-qofim (I Look Through The Monkeys’ Eyes). Eqed, 1987.

=== Books in translation ===
- Loot – selected poems 1977-2025, (Darklight, New York 2025)
- The Museum of Time, English, (Dhauli Books, Bhubaneswar 2025)
- Dete (Child), translated into Serbian by Vida Ognjenović,(Arhipelag, Belgrade 2025)
- Language Says, selected poems 1977-2019, Spanish (El idioma dice), translated by Gerardo Lewin, Valparaiso Ediciones, Granada, Spain 2023
- Child, English, translated by Seth Michelson (Broken Sleep Books, 2023)
- Duet of Dawn, Japanese (Akatsuki no Nijuso 暁の二重奏), translated by Maki Starfield, Junpa Books, Tokyo 2023
- Haiku Travelogue, French (Haiku du Bord du Chemin), translated by Benjamin Boulitrop, Voix d'Encre, Montelimar, 2022
- Amir Or, Selected Poems, The Golden Wreath Book, Hebrew/English/Macedonian, translated to Macedonian by Zoran Ancevski (SPE, Struga 2021)
- Sand and Time, Persian, (Shen O Zaman), selected poems, translated by Rosa Jamali, (8 Publishing, Ahvaz 2021)
- The Museum of Time, Greek (To Mouseio Xronou), translated by Anastassis Vistonitis, (Bakxikon, Athens 2020)
- Wings, French (Ailes), translated by Michel Eckhart (maelstrÖm reEvolution, Brussels, 2020)
- Haiku Travelogue, French (Haiku du Bord du Chemin), translated by Benjamin Boulitrop (Aleph, Paris, 2020)
- The Right View (A paisagem correta) into Portuguese by Moacir Amancio (Relicário Edições, São Paulo, 2020)
- Language Says (Zaban Manshourist) into Persian by Rosa Jamali (Mehrodel Publication, Teheran, 2020)
- Between Here and There (Entre ici et là), into French by Michel Eckhard Elial, (Éditions Érès, Toulouse, 2019)
- More (Selected Poems), into Georgian by Nika Jorjaneli, Nodar Dumbadze Publishers, Tbilisi, 2018
- Wings, into English by Seth Michelson, Sagging Meniscus, New York 2018
- Loot (Selectet Poems), English, Dhauli Books, Bhubaneswar 2018
- Say and I'll be, into Serbian by Vida Ognjenović and David Albahari (Reci i Ja Ću Biti), Arhipelag, Belgrade 2017
- Lessons, (Učne Ure) into Slovenian, (Beletrina libri, Ljubljana 2017)
- Language Says – selected poems, (ЕЗИКЪТ КАЗВА) into Bulgarian by Antonia Apostolova and Robert Levy, (Da Publishers, Sofia 2017)
- The Museum of Time – selected poems, (时间博物馆) into Chinese, by Wang Hao (FLTRP, Beijing 2017)
- The Kingdom Part 1: The Runnaway, into English by Anthony Berris (Amazon 2017)
- Dédale (The Maze); into French, by Isabelle Dotan (maelstrÖm reEvolution, Brussels 2016)
- Reci i Ja Ću Biti (Say And I'll Be); into Serbian, by Vida Ognjenović and David Albahari, (Kuća poezije, Banja Luka 2016)
- Krila (Wings) into Serbian, by Vida Ognjenović, (Arhipelag, Belgrade 2016)
- Dia>Logos; into English. Selected poems, (ArtAArk, Delhi/London/NY 2015)
- Muzei Vremena (The Museum of Time); into Serbian, by Vida Ognjenović and David Albahari,(Arhipelag, Belgrade 2015)
- Twarze (Faces); into Polish by Beata Tarnowska, (Z bliska, Goldap 2014)
- Tredici Poesie (Thirteen Poems); into Italian by Paolo Ruffilli, (The Writer publications, Milan 2014)
- Mucize ve Yağma (Miracle and Loot); into Turkish by Ulker Ince, (Şiirden Yayıncılık, Istanbul 2014)
- Să Te Vorbim Pe Tine (Let's Speak you); into Romanian by Ioana Ieronim, trilingual e-book with new translations, Romanian/English/Hebrew, (Contemporary Literature Press, The University of Bucharest, in conjunction with The British Council, Bucharest 2014) http://editura.mttlc.ro/carti/Amir%20Or.%20Let's%20Speak%20You.%20CLP.pdf
- Le Musée de Temps (The Museum of Time); into French by Aurélia Lassaque and Jacques Rancourt, (Editions de l'Amandier, Paris 2013)
- Milagro (Miracle); into Spanish by Karla Coreas,(Sur Editores, Havana 2013)
- Der museum van de tijd (The Museum of Time); into Dutch by Peter Boreas, (Azul press, Maastricht, Amsterdam 2012)
- Pohara (Loot);into Serbian by David Albahari and Vida Ognjenović,(Arhipelag publishers, Belgrade 2012)
- Miracle/The Hours, Milagro/Las Horas; into Spanish by Karla Coreas, (Urpi Editores, NY 2011)
- Plates from the Museum of Time (ArtAark, New Delhi, New York, London 2009)
- Day — into English by Fiona Sampson, (Dedalus, Dublin, 2006)
- Wiersz (Poem); into Polish by Beata Tarnowska, (Portret, Olsztyn 2006)
- Să Te Vorbim Pe Tine (Let's Speak You); into Romanian by Ioana Ieronim, (Vinea Press, Buchaest 2006)
- Poem, into English by Helena Berg, (Dedalus, Dublin 2004, Romanian and Polish editions 2006)
- Language Says, English (Chattanooga, PM publications, Chattanooga, Tennessee, United States, 2001)
- Davej se, disam ziva voda (Drowning, He Breaths Living Water) — into Macedonian by Bogomil Gjuzel and Zoran Ancevski; (The Pleiades Series of Struga Poetry Festival, 2000)
- Miracle; English/Hebrew by Theo Dorgan, Tony Curtis and Mcdara Woods (Poetry Ireland, Dublin, 1998)
- As-sha‛ru Fattatu l-Mujrimin (Poetry is a Criminal Girl); into Arabic by Reuven Snir (Faradis publishers, Paris, 1995)

=== Or's translations into Hebrew ===
- The Gospel of Thomas (1992),
- Limb-Loosening Desire (An Anthology of Erotic Greek Poetry 1993)
- Stories From The Mahabharata (1998)
- Lizard by Banana Yoshimoto (1998, with Akiko Takahashi)
- To a Woman by Shuntaro Tanikawa (2000, with Akiko Takahashi)
- The Distance Between Us by Fiona Sampson (2008)
- The Song of The Salamander by Aurélia Lassaque (2014)
- Mara's Ghost by Anastassis Vistonitis (2016)
- Bitter Buckwheat by Jidi Madjia (2016)
- From The Hebrew Side - selected translations (2017)
- The Song of God - Bhagavad Gita (2024)

== See also ==
- Hebrew literature
- The Modern Hebrew Poem Itself
