= Tamara Kamenszain =

Argentinian poet (1947–2021)

- Born: 9 February 1947; Buenos Aires, Argentina
- Died: 28 July 2021 (aged 74); Buenos Aires
- Occupations: Poet, essayist.

Tamara Kamenszain (9 February 1947 – 28 July 2021) was an Argentine poet and essayist.

== Biography ==
Kamenszain was born in Buenos Aires. She studied philosophy and worked in journalism from a very young age, editing the Culture sections of newspapers La Opinión and Clarín.

Later, she devoted herself to teaching literature at the University of Buenos Aires and the Autonomous University of Mexico.

Her essays on Argentinian and Latin American poetry are the subject of study in universities in Argentina and abroad. Her books of poetry have been totally or partially translated into several languages. Along with Arturo Carrera and Néstor Perlongher, she belonged to the 1970s generation of poets known as Neo-Baroque.

She was founder and general advisor of the bachelor's degree in Writing Arts at the National University of the Arts (UNA).

== Awards ==
- Premio Honorífico José Lezama Lima awarded by Casa de las Américas, Cuba, 2015.
- Platinum Konex Award 2014: Poetry.
- 2012 Buenos Aires Book Fair Critics' Award, for La novela de la poesía en abril de 2013.
- First Prize. Third Hispanic American Poetry Contest "Festival de la Lira", Concedido a "El eco de mi madre". 2011.
- Pablo Neruda Centennial Medal of Honor awarded by the President of Chile.. July 2004 2004.
- Konex Award Merit Diploma 1994. (Poetry).
- First Essay Prize. Government of the City of Buenos Aires, awarded to the published production of the three-year period 1993-1996 for La edad de la poesía.
- John Simon Guggenheim Memorial Foundation Fellowship. Género: poetry (1988–89)
- Third National Essay Prize, awarded to the published production of the three-year period 1983–86, for El texto silencioso (The Silent Text).
- Finalist for the Anagrama Essay Prize, with El texto silencioso (1980).
- Poetry Production Support Award. Awarded to De este lado del Mediterráneo by the Fondo Nacional de las Artes de Argentina (1972).

== Works ==
=== Poetry ===
- 1973: De este lado del Mediterráneo
- 1977: Los No
- 1986: La casa grande
- 1991: Vida de living
- 1998: Tango Bar
- 2003: El Ghetto
  - English translation:The Ghetto (2011; translation by Seth Michelson)
- 2005: Solos y solas
  - English translation: Men and women alone (2010; translation by Cecilia Rossi)
- 2010: El eco de mi madre
  - English translation: The Echo of My Mother (2012: translation by Cecilia Rossi)
- 2012: La novela de la poesía: poesía reunida
- 2014: El libro de los divanes
- 2021: Chicas en tiempos suspendidos

=== Essays ===
- 1983: El texto silencioso: tradición y vanguardia en la poesía sudamericana
- 1996: La edad de la poesía
- 2000: Historias de amor y otros ensayos sobre poesía
- 2006: La boca del testimonio: lo que dice la poesía
- 2016: Una intimidad inofensiva: Los que escriben con lo que hay
- 2018: El libro de Tamar
