= Sometime, Somewhere =

- Spanish: Algún día, en algún lugar
- Directed by: Ricardo Preve
- Written by: Ricardo Preve
- Story by: Ricardo Preve
- Produced by: Stefan Bechtel; Ramón Cardini; Sergio Albertoni; Avery Chenoweth
- Starring: Tanishka Cruz; Erick Resek; Max Luna; Edgar Lara; Andrea Douglas; Preston Reynolds
- Cinematography: Leonardo Val
- Edited by: Gustavo Despouy
- Music by: Andrés Rubinsztejn
- Production companies: Ricardo Preve Films LLC; Esto del Cine SRL
- Release date: October 28, 2023 (Virginia Film Festival)
- Running time: 97 minutes
- Countries: Argentina; United States
- Languages: English; Spanish

Sometime, Somewhere (original title in Spanish: Algún día, en algún lugar) is a 2023 Argentine-American documentary film written and directed by Ricardo Preve. The feature documentary tells the story of a group of Hispanic and Latin American immigrants in Charlottesville, Virginia: who they are and why they left their homes, what happened to them when they arrived in the United States, and what are their hopes for the future.

Also featured in the film are lawyers and physicians who work with the migrants, and community activists. The film was shown in various international film festivals, and earned awards and nominations.

== Synopsis ==
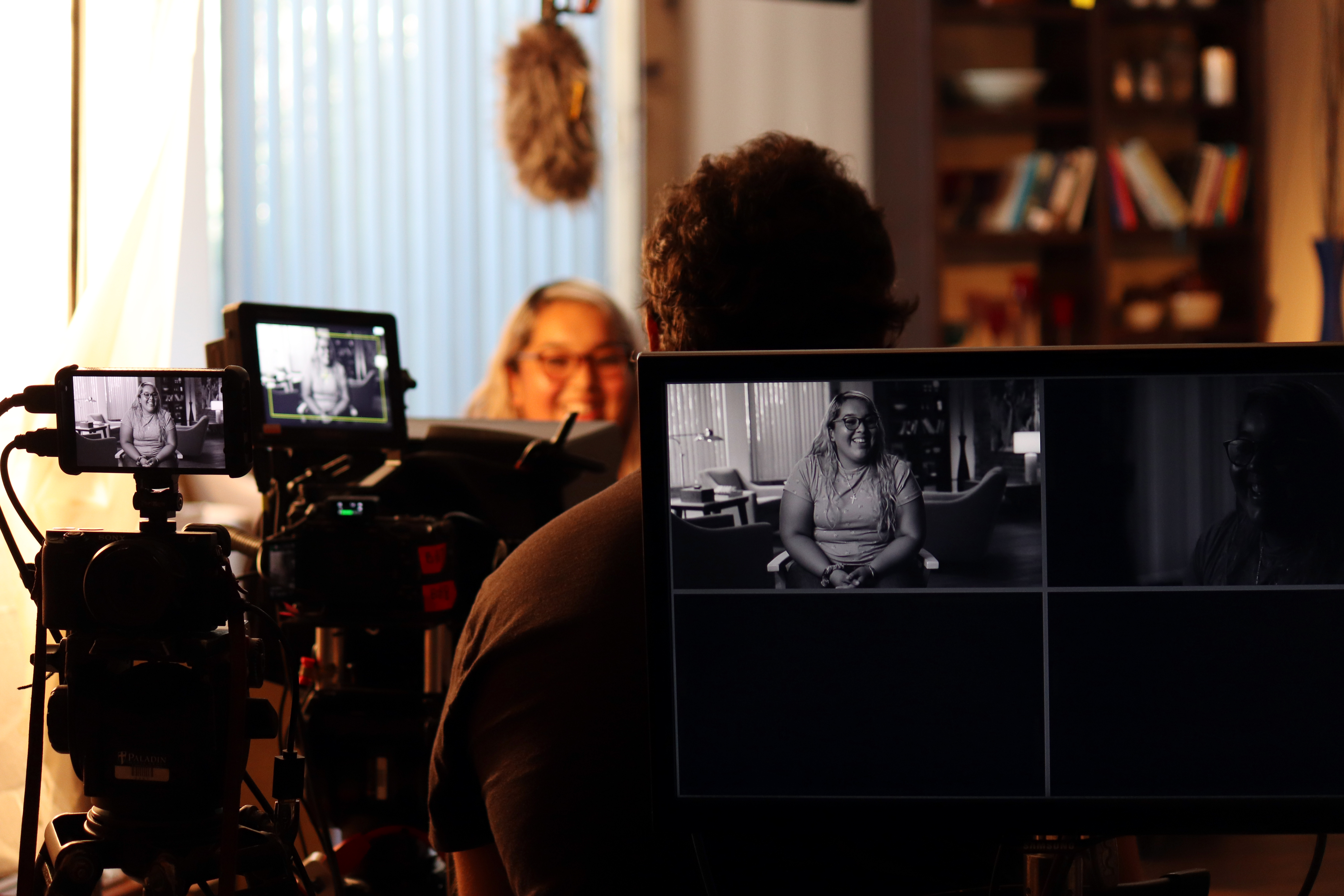

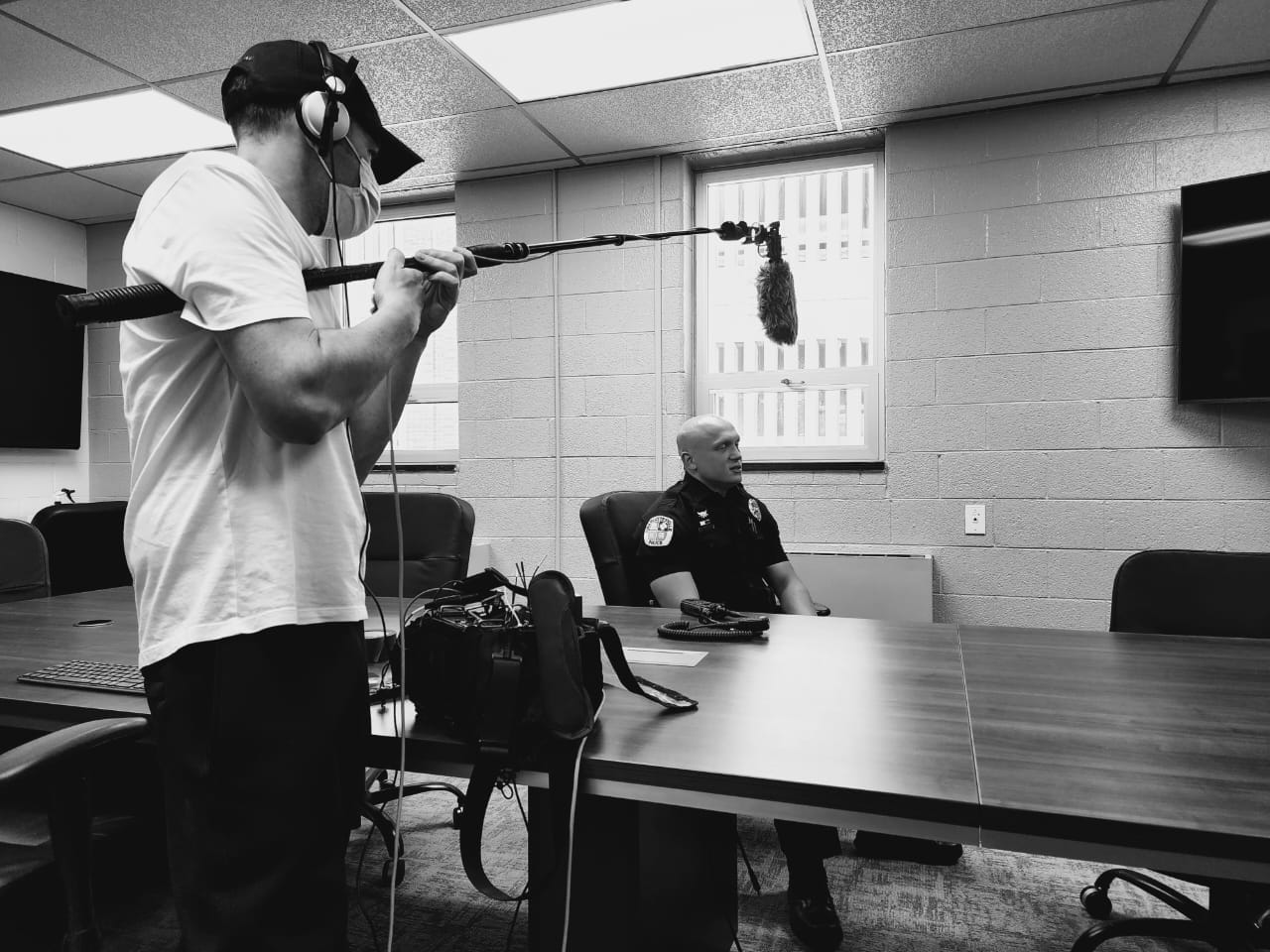
Backstage of the film.

The first act of the film looks at why millions of people are escaping from their home countries in Latin America. The immigrants give testimonies about what motivated their journey to the United States, tell stories of drug cartels and domestic violence, and talk about the various economic reasons that led them to flee: poverty, global climate change, and a lack of economic opportunities.

The second act opens with scenes from The Grapes of Wrath (1940), the film starring Henry Fonda and directed by John Ford. Film historian Dr. Kevin Hagopian explains the connection with present-day migrations. It then looks at other examples of forced migrations in United States history: the escape of the Irish from the potato blight, and the plight of enslaved African Americans.

The film continues with migrant interviews about the challenges of living as undocumented persons in the United States. Participants include a Native American Guatemalan woman who lives in a church under asylum conditions, two men who own a pizza shop, a couple who work in a sawmill, an air conditioning repair man, and several others.

Also in the film are three immigration attorneys who work with migrants trying to avoid deportation, a Puerto Rican community organizer who fights for immigrant rights, two doctors who focus on providing bilingual health care, and the Charlottesville chief of police who talks about the traumatic effects that the August 2017 white supremacist attacks had on the town.

The final chapter is about an organization called Sin Barreras, led by a former Marine and Hispanic activist which fights for immigrant rights, a woman who teaches driving to immigrants so they can get a Virginia driver's license, and a Mexican painter who for the last 15 years has been organizing soccer matches for Hispanic immigrants.

The film also features Seth Michelson, a poet and professor at Washington and Lee University in Lexington, Virginia. He works with undocumented migrant children who are incarcerated at maximum security prisons, and teaches them poetry. The films closes with some final reflections from the participants.

== Background, production and release ==
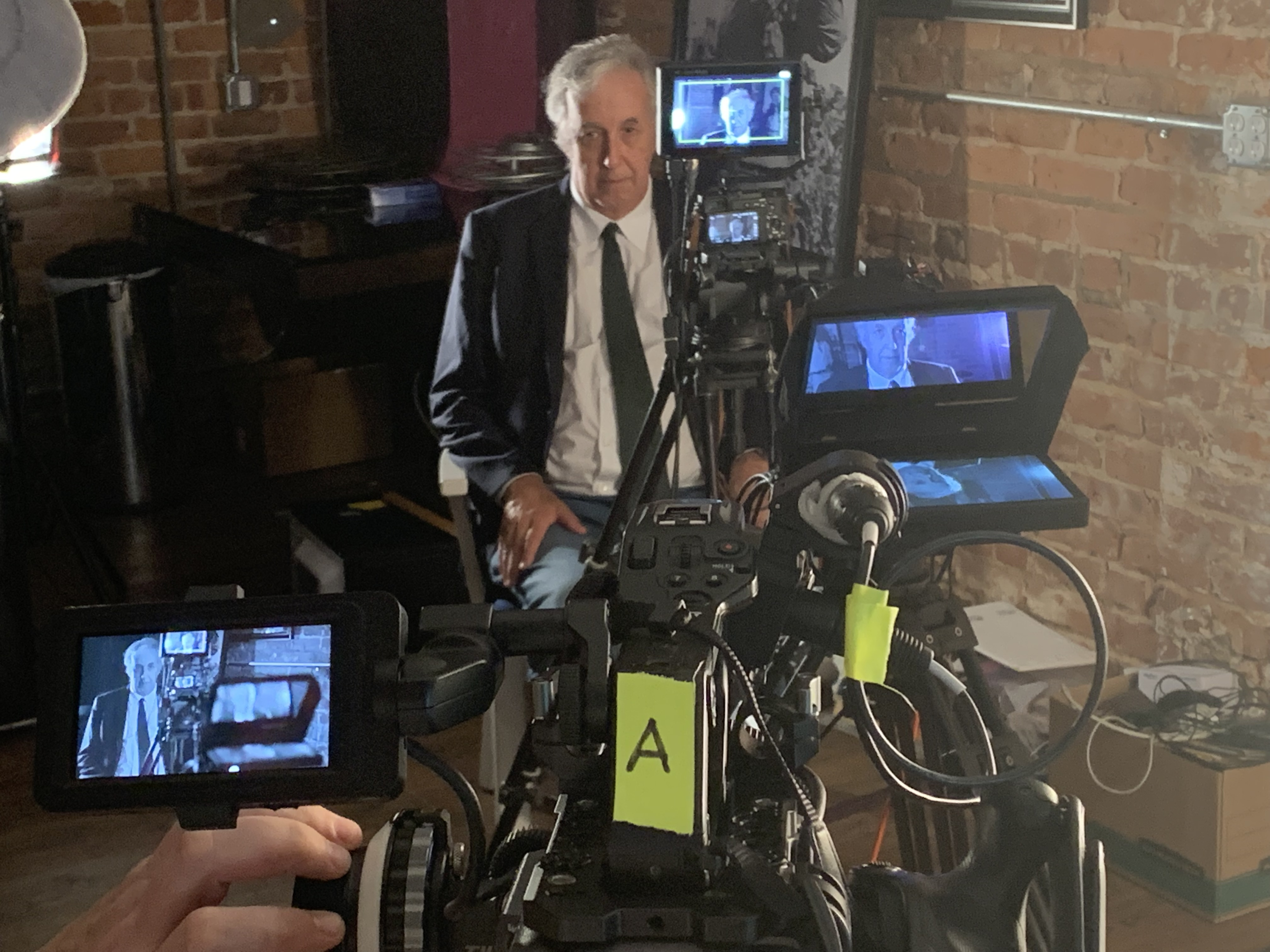
Ricardo Preve during the shooting of the film (2022).

Preve came up with the idea for the documentary based on his own experience as an immigrant from Argentina in 1977. The film was entirely shot in central Virginia. Principal photography took place during August 2022, over a three-week period, with a production team that travelled from Argentina, and with characters recruited from among the Charlottesville immigrant community.

From the start of production, Preve intended the film to be shot in black and white, and both the production design and the photography were developed with this idea in mind. Editing and post-production of the film took place in Buenos Aires, Argentina in early 2023. During that year, the film began its public appearances as an official selection at the 36th Virginia Film Festival with a screening on October 28, 2023, at the University of Virginia. Prior to the screening, Preve received the Gov. Gerald L. Baliles Founders Award in recognition of his contributions to filmmaking in Virginia.

The film was also an official selection at the 8th Golden Gate International Film Festival, where it received a nomination for Best Cinematography, and won the Best Foreign Film Award. It was also an official selection at the 15th LatinUy International Film Festival in Punta del Este, Uruguay, where it won the Best Documentary Award. In 2024, it was nominated for Best Documentary at the Iberoamerican Film Festival in Miami.

== Awards and nominations ==
Year	Event	Category	Work	Result	Ref.
2023	Golden Gate International Film Festival	Best Foreign Film	Sometime, Somewhere	Nominated	
2023	Golden Gate International Film Festival	Best Cinematography	Sometime, Somewhere	Won	
2023	LatinUy Film Festival, Punta del Este	Best Documentary	Sometime, Somewhere	Won	
2023	Virginia Film Festival	Gov. Gerald L. Baliles Founders Award	Ricardo Preve	Won	
2023	Antigua Academy Film Festival	Best International Documentary Honorific Mention	Sometime, Somewhere	Won	
2024	Iberoamerican Film Festival Miami	Best Documentary	Sometime, Somewhere	Nominated	
