= Scott Mactavish =

American filmmaker and author

- Born: William Scott Self; April 20, 1965 (age 61); Pulaski, VA
- Education: New York University; The University of Alabama
- Occupations: Filmmaker, Author
- Notable work: MURPH: The Protector (film); Ride for Lance (film); The New Dad's Survival Guide (book)
- Military career
- Allegiance: United States
- Branch: United States Navy
- Service years: 1984 - 1990
- Rank: Petty Officer
- Units: Submarine Squadron 6 USS L.Y. Spear
- Website: https://www.mactavish.us/bio

Scott Mactavish (born April 20, 1965, in Pulaski, Virginia) is an American filmmaker and author. Mactavish began his career in New York City after serving in the United States Navy and attending film school at New York University. His national media appearances include Fox News, NBC, PBS, MSNBC, Today in New York and CBS, and he has been a guest speaker at corporations and universities around the country, including Penn State and the University of Virginia. His book The New Dad's Survival Guide is a perennial favorite in the parenting category. Mactavish also worked as an actor on stage and screen, including a role in the original Super Mario Brothers movie. Early in his career he changed his name legally to avoid conflicts with author Will Self and Hollywood producer William Self. Mactavish is a family name on his mother's side.

== Early life ==
Mactavish was born and raised in the Appalachian foothills of Virginia. At age seventeen, his mother signed enlistment papers on his behalf for the United States Navy and he attended boot camp at the Recruit Training Command in San Diego, California. He later served with Submarine Squadron 6, aboard the USS L.Y. Spear, and in Guantanamo Bay, Cuba. He received an honorable discharge after four years of active duty and two reserve duty and attended New York University on the GI Bill.

== Career ==
Upon graduation from NYU, Mactavish worked in various roles on studio films while writing original screenplays and books. He also worked as an actor on stage and screen, including the titular role in playwright Jo Carson's Preacher with a Horse to Ride. He also played a goomba in the 1993 film Super Mario Bros., Navy sailor Ken Truitt in the NBC series What Happened? and an uncredited stunt double in The Crow.

Following the attacks of 9/11 Mactavish shifted his focus to work behind the camera and founded Mactavish Pictures in New York City.

Mactavish served as executive producer on the international documentary Chagas, directed by Ricardo Preve. He wrote, produced and directed Summer Running: The Race to Cure Breast Cancer featuring Sissy Spacek. The film was used to raise over $30,000 for breast cancer research. He also made God and Country: Untold Stories of the American Military, a feature documentary that explores the little-known humanitarian work carried out by the American military. Through Mactavish Pictures, he produced commercials and corporate films for clients in various industries including Pepsi, Dun and Bradstreet, Deloitte & Touche, Pitney Bowes and The Gap. He also worked on several big-budget Hollywood films including Evan Almighty.

As writer, he continued composing feature screenplays and wrote his first book, The New Dad's Survival Guide, published by Little, Brown and Co. in 2005. The book was an instant hit and made several best-seller lists, and continues to be a popular international title. As a freelance writer, he contributed to Indiewire, Windcheck Sailing Magazine and Film Threat.

== 2011–present ==
Mactavish wrote, produced and directed Ride for Lance, a tribute to Navy SEAL Lance Vacarro, who gave his life for his country in 2008. Four of Lance's SEAL friends rode motorcycles from Virginia Beach to Alaska and back in thirty-one days to honor his memory. Mactavish then wrote, produced and directed MURPH: The Protector, a critically acclaimed tribute to Navy SEAL LT Michael Patrick Murphy, a Medal of Honor recipient who gave his life for his men. Following MURPH, Mactavish wrote, produced and directed Family Mission: The TJ Labraico Story, distributed by Virgil Entertainment. In 2019, he began production on Shattered Lives, a feature documentary that explores domestic terrorism in America prior to 9/11. That same year he began development on Under the Trestle, a true crime documentary based on the national bestseller of the same name by Ron Peterson Jr. The murder case covered in the book took place in Pulaski County, Virginia, where Mactavish was raised.

In 2013 he co-authored Battle Ready: Memoir of a SEAL Warrior Medic, published by St. Martin's Press. The book was optioned as a scripted series by Joe Carnahan.

== Personal life ==
Mactavish is married and has three sons. He is an advisory board member of The Davis Focus Project, a non-profit that helps veterans overcome Traumatic Brain Injury, PTSD, depression, anxiety, and insomnia through innovative human performance protocols. He also serves as the public affairs officer for Wheels for Warriors, a Michigan nonprofit that builds adapted motorcycles for combat-wounded veterans. He coaches soccer and divides his time between Nashville and New York City. At age 46 he returned to college and completed a bachelor's degree at the University of Alabama.

== Filmography ==
Year	Title	Actor	Director	Producer	Writer	Notes
1989	Preacher with a Horse to Ride	Yes				Stage Play
1990	The Night Thoreau Spent in Jail	Yes				Stage Play, Lead
1991	Flowers for Judith (HBO)	Yes		Yes		NYU Thesis film
1992	What Happened? (NBC)	Yes				
1992	Young Indiana Jones Chronicles					Crew
1993	Super Mario Brothers	Yes				
1993	American Experience (PBS)	Yes				
1994	The Crow					Stunt Photo Double
1994	Hudsucker Proxy					Crew
1994	Chasers					Crew
1994	The Road to Wellville					Crew
1997	Major Burns Comedy Short		Yes	Yes	Yes	Pseudo.com
2005	Chagas, a Hidden Affliction			Yes		Executive Producer
2005	Summer Running		Yes	Yes	Yes	
2007	God and Country		Yes	Yes	Yes	
2007	Evan Almighty					Crew
2011	Ride for Lance		Yes	Yes	Yes	Lionsgate
2013	MURPH: The Protector		Yes	Yes	Yes	Lionsgate
2015	Family Mission		Yes	Yes	Yes	Virgil Entertainment
2019	Battle Ready Series				Yes	Co-Author, Book
2023	Shattered Lives		Yes	Yes	Yes	
2024	Under the Trestle		Yes	Yes	Yes	
2024	The Widow Spy		Yes	Yes	Yes	
2024	Wheels for Warriors Series		Yes	Yes	Yes	

== Books ==
Date	Title	Publisher	Notes
2005	The New Dad's Survival Guide	Little, Brown and Company	
2013	Battle Ready: Memoir of a SEAL Warrior Medic	St. Martin's Press	Co-Author
