= A Price We Have to Pay =

- Spanish: Un precio que tenemos que pagar
- Directed by: Ricardo Preve
- Written by: Ricardo Preve
- Story by: Ricardo Preve
- Starring: Clara Preve Durrieu; Ricardo Preve; Lê Thi Vân
- Production companies: Ricardo Preve Films LLC; Esto del Cine SRL
- Running time: 89 minutes
- Countries: Argentina; United States
- Languages: English; Spanish; Vietnamese

A Price We Have to Pay (in Spanish: Un precio que tenemos que pagar) is a documentary film written and directed by Ricardo Preve. An Argentine-American co-production, the film explores the disappearance of Argentine journalist Ignacio Ezcurra in Saigon, South Vietnam, in May 1968, and presents evidence regarding those potentially responsible for his death.

The documentary features participation from Ezcurra's family, as well as journalists and historians, using extensive archival material. It presents the findings of a journalistic investigation conducted across the United States, Vietnam, and Argentina.

== Synopsis ==
The film focuses on the investigation into Ezcurra's disappearance. The central narrative arc follows the search for a photograph of Ezcurra's remains, previously known only through a low-quality copy, and the latest breakthroughs in the investigation of his death. While the official version claimed Ezcurra was killed by communist guerrillas (Viet Cong), the documentary finds no evidence to support this. Instead, it gathers information suggesting that Ezcurra was killed on May 8, 1968, by the South Vietnamese Police. The motive was allegedly his investigation into the deaths of four colleagues who had died three days prior in the same location where he disappeared.

The production discovered an unpublished 1968 Argentine government report on the journalist's disappearance. The report contained a photograph of Ezcurra's remains, leading the team to identify the photographer: Bunyo Ishikawa from Japan. Ishikawa, who is still alive, shared three additional photos of the remains with the production, which allowed the investigators to pinpoint the exact alleyway in Chợ Lớn (Saigon's Chinatown) where he was killed. The team also collected testimonies from elderly local residents who witnessed Ezcurra's body.

Furthermore, a 2007 audio interview with Ezcurra's mother reveals a meeting she held at a church in Buenos Aires with a man who claimed the CIA was responsible for the murder. This and other testimonies challenge the theory that the Viet Cong were responsible. The film concludes with a tribute to Ezcurra: the film crew places a wreath of light blue and white flowers (the colors of the Argentine flag) into the Mekong River.

== Context, production and release ==
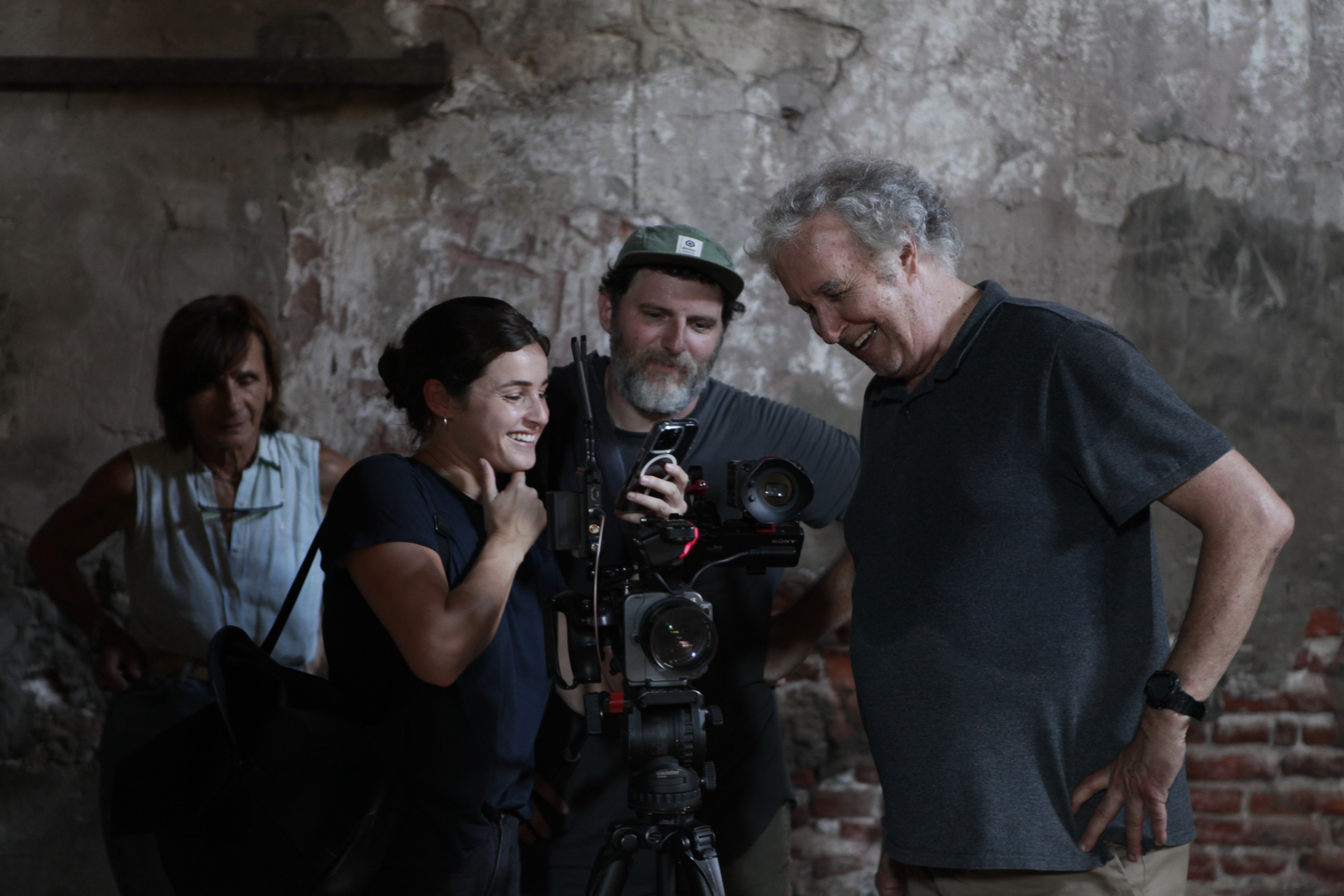
Director Ricardo Preve (right) during the filming of the documentary.

Preve conceived the project as a tribute to Ezcurra. The director remained skeptical that, in a conflict as heavily documented as the Vietnam War, a Western correspondent could simply vanish at a street corner in Saigon. Regarding his motivation, Preve stated:

The story of Ignacio Ezcurra is not well known in Argentina, so I wanted to tell it so that people in my country would know him. We came to Vietnam not to record Ignacio's historical milestones, but to travel back in time to the places he visited and experience what he lived through. Through this small story, we want to tell a broader story about the war. I also want to show that Vietnam is not just about war, but also about culture, customs, beautiful landscapes, and people; people who have endured so much suffering to achieve the independence we have today.

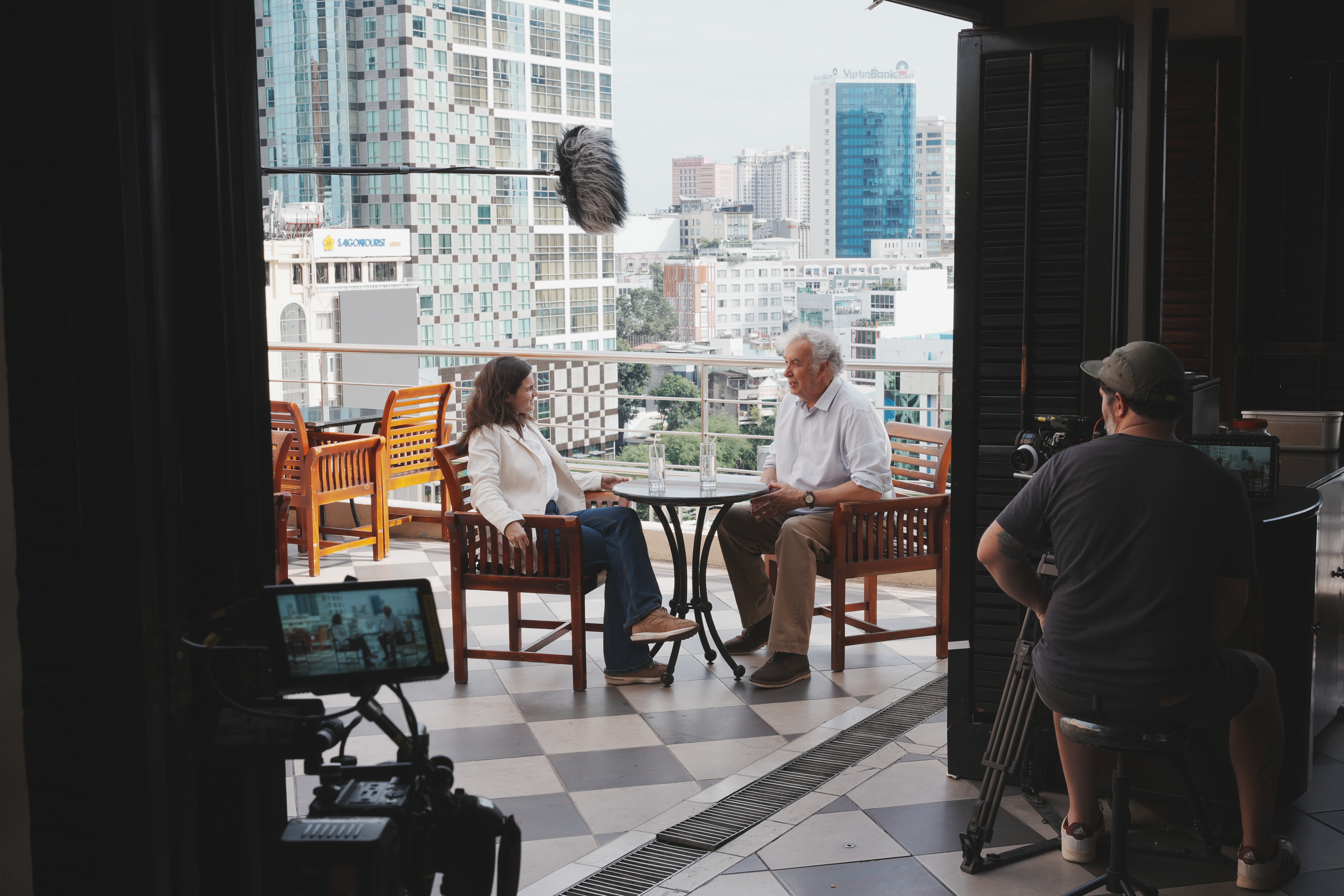
Clara Preve Durrieu and Ricardo Preve in a scene from the film at the Caravelle Hotel, Ho Chi Minh City, Vietnam.

The production established three investigative teams: one in the United States, researching government archives; one in Vietnam, led by journalist Lê Thi Vân; and one in Argentina, composed of the director and journalist Clara Preve Durrieu.

Filming took place in 2025 across Argentina (Buenos Aires, Buenos Aires Province and Córdoba) and Vietnam (Ho Chi Minh City and the Mekong Delta). Editing and post-production is expected to be completed in Buenos Aires in mid 2026.

== Awards and nominations ==
The film earned a nomination in the international competition at the 41st Mar del Plata International Film Festival, in the best feature film category.
