= The Patagonian Bones =

- Directed by: Ricardo Preve
- Written by: Ricardo Preve
- Cinematography: Alan Steinberg
- Music by: Ricardo Tursarkisian
- Production companies: Ricardo Preve Films; Esto del Cine SRL
- Release date: 2015
- Running time: 55 minutes
- Country: Argentina
- Languages: Spanish; English; Welsh

The Patagonian Bones is a 2015 Argentine film written and directed by Ricardo Preve. With a telefilm format, The Patagonian Bones is based on the true-life story of Catherine Roberts, the first Welsh woman to die in Patagonia in 1865, and on the 20-year work of three Argentine scientists to identify her remains. The film had a successful run at international festivals, winning awards and nominations.

== Plot ==
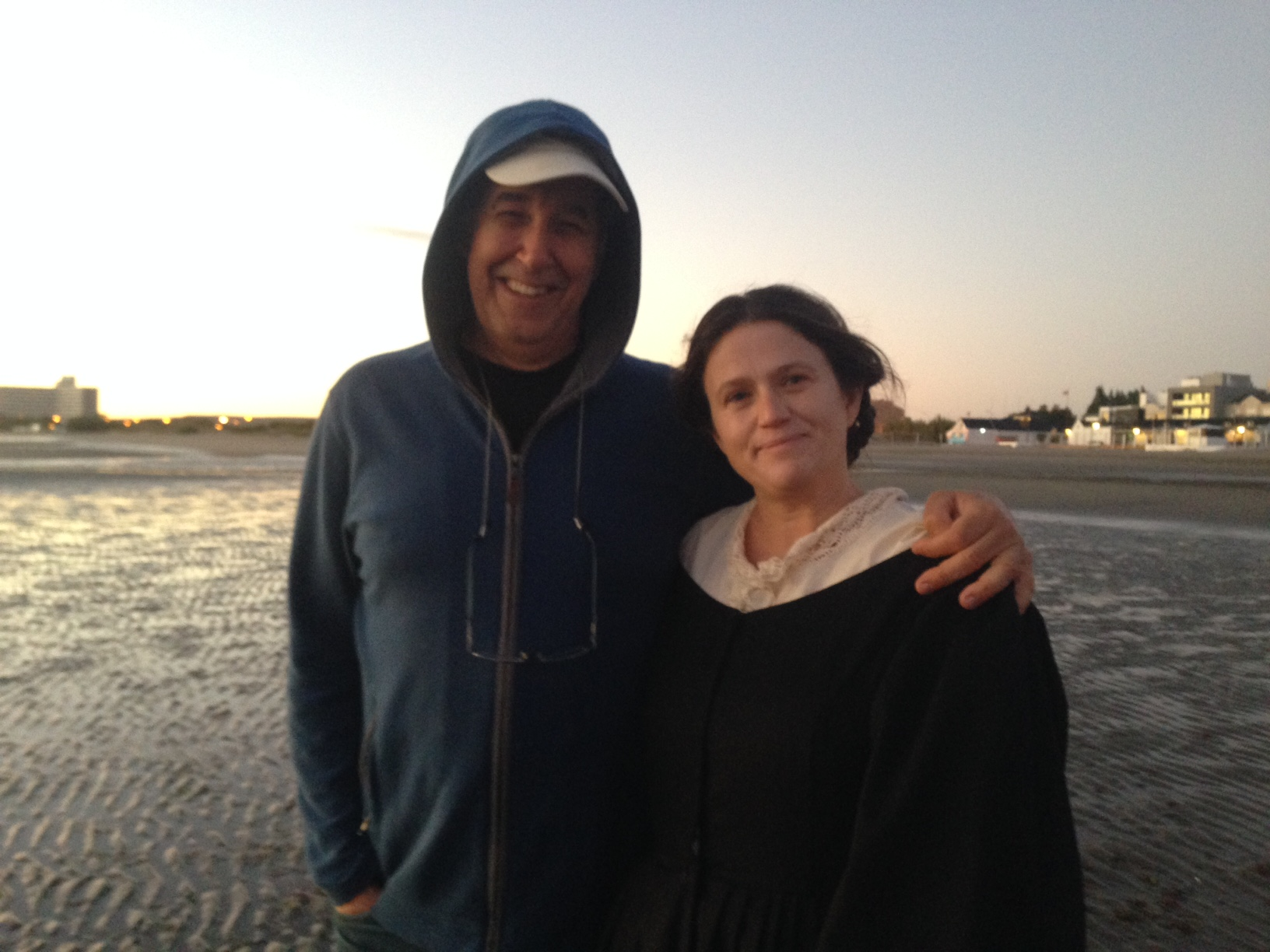
Filmmaker Ricardo Preve and actress Paula Odell Humphries, who played the role of Catherine Roberts in the documentary

A group of Welsh colonists decides to emigrate to Argentina's Patagonia region in 1865. Among them is a woman called Catherine Roberts, her husband, and her three children. On board the sailing ship Mimosa they arrive at present day Puerto Madryn, Chubut Province, Argentina on July 28, 1865. Catherine dies on August 21 and is buried near the coast, but all trace of her is lost until 1995 when some bones are discovered by chance. Argentine scientists Silvia Dahinten, Julieta Gomez Otero, and Fernando Coronato work for 20 years to determine if the remains found are those of Catherine. In 2015, with the arrival in Puerto Madryn of a Welsh descendant of Catherine, and new scientific research techniques, the scientists are able to confirm that the bones found in 1995 are those of Catherine.

== Background, production and release ==
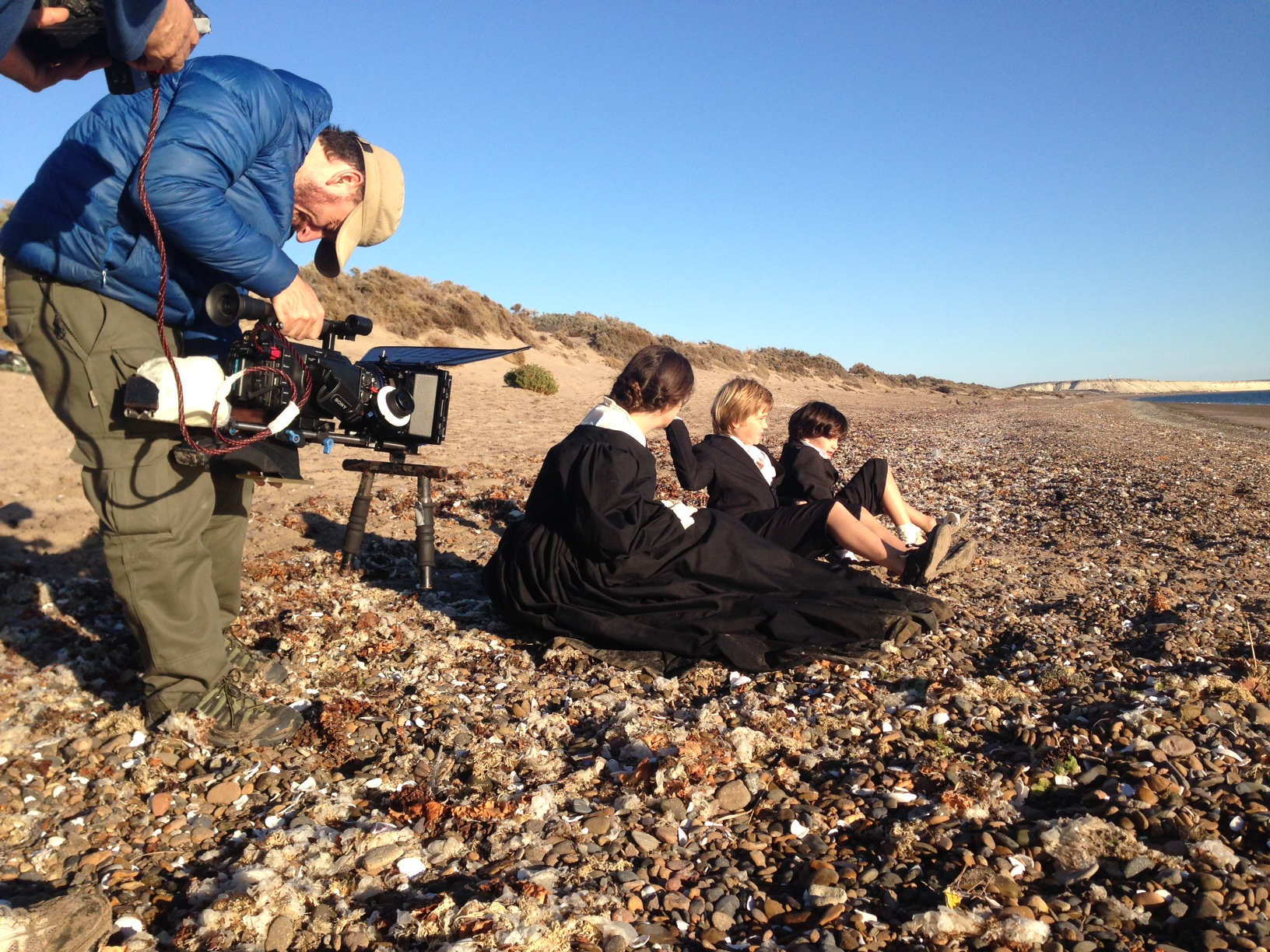

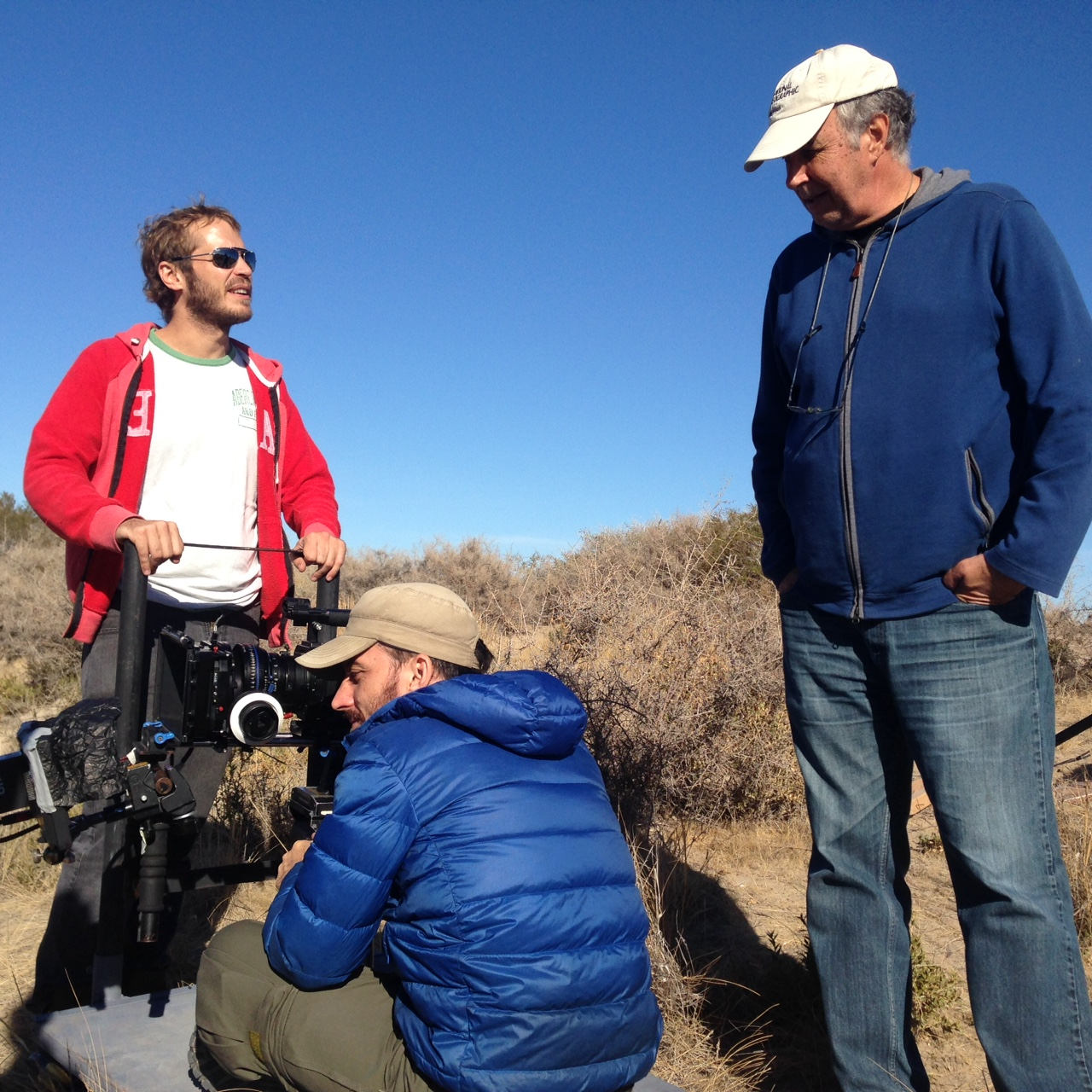
Behind the scenes of the film, 2015

Preve came in contact with the story while visiting the city of Puerto Madryn in 2012. He met Dahinten, Gomez Otero and Coronato who were working on the project as researchers of the National Patagonic Center (CENPAT), a dependency of the CONICET. When the remains were found in 1995, also recovered were a gold wedding band (with no initials on it), a mother of pearl button, and a coffin made with European wood. The researchers suspected that the remains were those of Catherine Roberts, but it was not possible to be certain about this until the DNA found in the bones could be compared to that of a descendant of Catherine. Preve and his production team travelled to Wales and interviewed Nia Owen Ritchie, a descendant of Catherine. Then they returned to Argentina with Nia and filmed the extraction of a genetic sample from Nia, which determined that there was a 99% chance that the remains found in 1995 were those of Catherine. After the film was completed, in 2015 the documentary was broadcast on Argentina Public Television.

The film was also screened in theaters in Wales and is available in many countries on the online platforms Amazon Prime and YouTube. In 2020 the city of Puerto Madryn showed the film on the occasion of the 155th anniversary of the arrival of the Welsh settlers.

== Reception ==
The Patagonian Bones was well received by the press. The portal Cholila Online wrote that "The Patagonian Bones is a gripping story that encompasses our culture and identity as people of Chubut". The online page Chubut Cultural reviewed the film as an "excellent and original documentary". Pablo Esteban of the newspaper Página/12 wrote: "Documentary filmmaker Ricardo Preve became interested in the story and released The Patagonian Bones, which describes the life of the travelling Welsh woman and narrates the work to solve a captivating mystery".

== Awards and nominations ==
Year	Event	Category	Result
2015	Accolade Global Film Competition, California	Merit award in feature documentary	Won
2016	Nuevas Miradas en Televisión, Buenos Aires	Best production	Won
2016	Nuevas Miradas en Televisión, Buenos Aires	Best original score	Nominated
2018	Latitude Film Awards, London	Best feature documentary	Won
2019	North European International Film Festival, London	Best story	Won
2019	North European International Film Festival, London	Best educational and scientific film	Nominated
2019	London International Motion Picture Awards	Best feature documentary	Nominated
2020	Impact Docs Awards, California	Merit award in feature documentary	Won
