= Cine Cosmos =

Cinema in Buenos Aires

- Cine Cataluña; Cine Cosmos 70
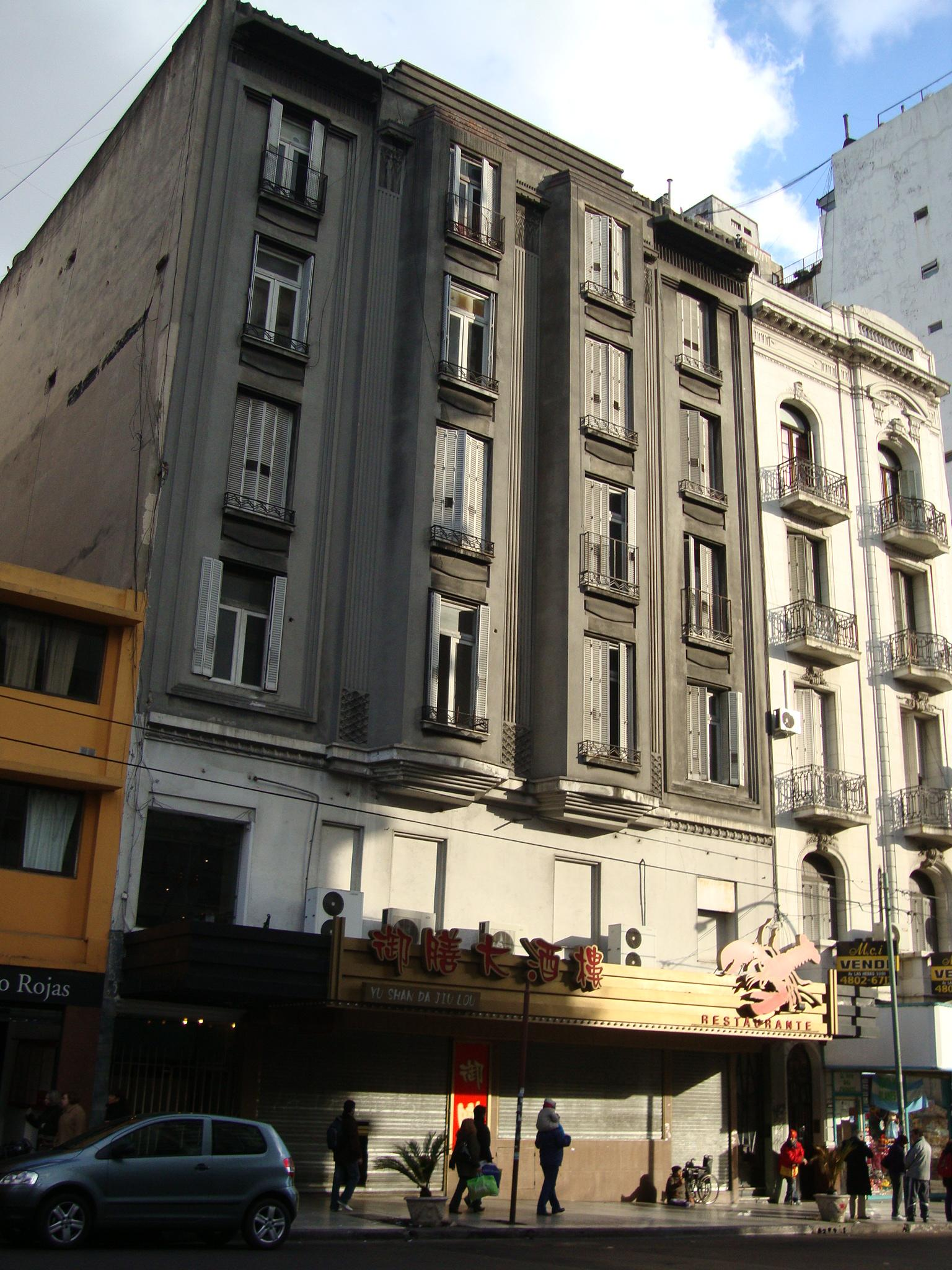
- Cine Cosmos in 2010

- Location within Greater Buenos Aires
- Address: Avenida Corrientes 2046; Buenos Aires; Argentina
- Coordinates: 34°36′17″S 58°23′46″W
- Owner: University of Buenos Aires
- Type: Cinema
- Screen: 1

Construction
- Opened: 1929
- Closed: 1987, 2006
- Reopened: 1966, 1997, 2010
- Architect: Albert Bourdon
- Builder: Jacques América

Website
- www.cinecosmos.uba.ar

Cine Cosmos is a restored cinema on Avenida Corrientes in Buenos Aires, Argentina. Originally inaugurated as Cine Cataluña in 1929, it became known under its current name in the 1960s for its showings of alternative Soviet cinema. Since 2010 it has been owned and operated by the University of Buenos Aires, Argentina's largest university.

== History ==
The building that now houses Cine Cosmos was originally designed by Belgian architect Albert Bourdon for the Cine-Teatro Cataluña. The Art deco building was built by engineer Jacques América and his construction company, and was first owned by Mrs. Fabrus and Mrs. Montardit. In 1955, it was bought by businessman Argentino Vainikoff, owner of the Soviet cinema distribution company Artkino Pictures, which had been founded in 1937.

Between 1947 and 1951, Soviet films had been banned in Argentina by decree of Raúl Apold, press chief of President Juan Domingo Perón. The censorship ended in 1951 due to lobbying efforts by Vainikoff and presidential secretary Martín Carlos Martínez, who convinced Perón to overturn the ban.

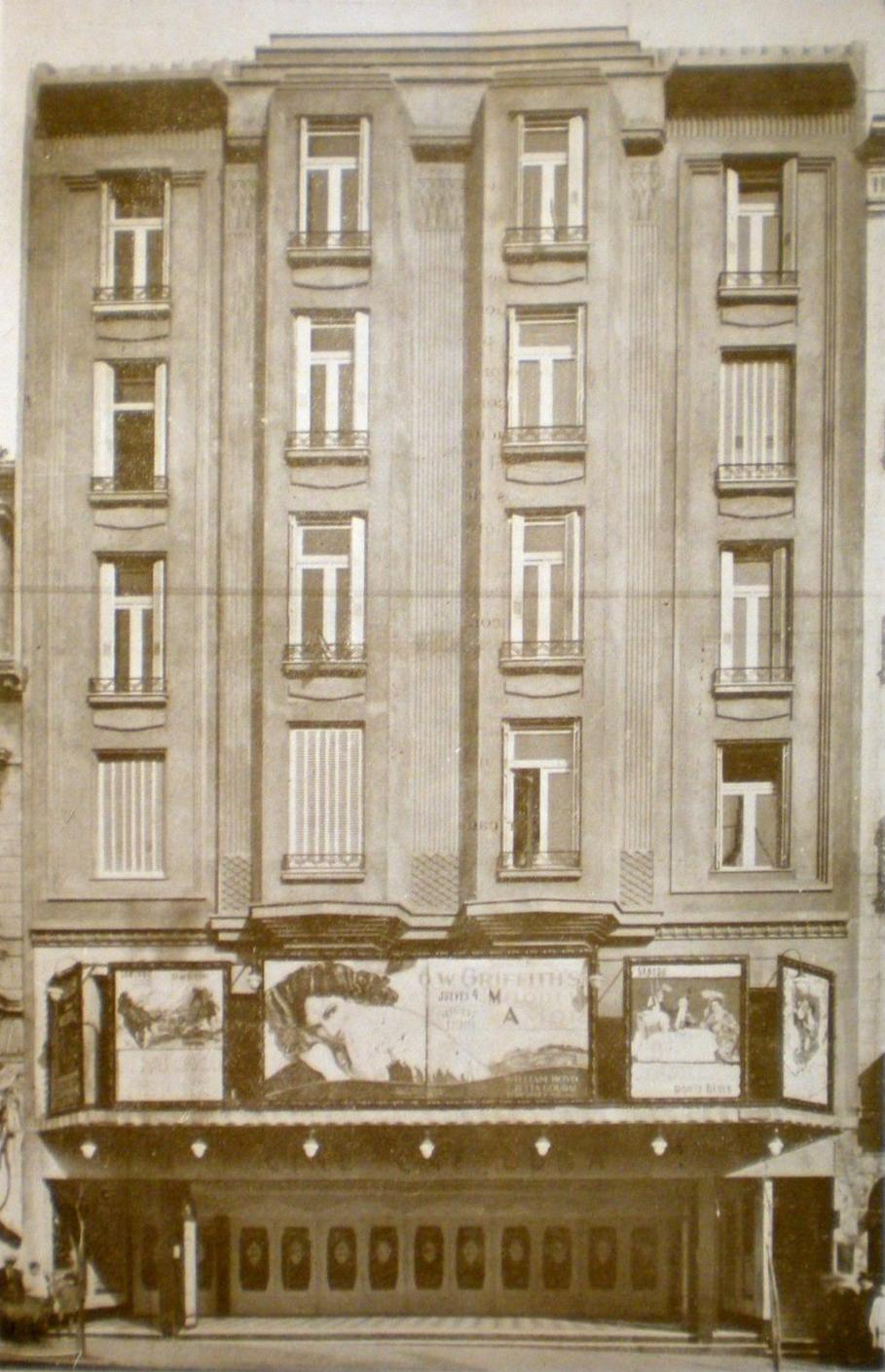
Cine Cataluña in 1929.

On 30 August 1966, the cinema was reopened under the name of Cine Cosmos 70 (a reference to 70 mm film). The first projection was a showing of the French film Dominique, by Yvan Noé. The first successful showing, however, was of the Czechoslovak film The Shop on Main Street, by Ján Kadár and Elmar Klos—the film was featured for twenty-three consecutive weeks.

The cinema continued to feature Eastern European films, such as The Cranes Are Flying, Closely Watched Trains, Loves of a Blonde, Lemonade Joe, and The Cold Summer of 1953. Soviet classics such as War and Peace and Battleship Potemkin were also featured during special cycles. The cinema's preference for films from Eastern Europe during the Cold War led to the Argentine government to associate it with the Communist Party, an allegation Vainikoff denied throughout his life.

Cine Cosmos closed for the first time toward the end of 1987. The premises were occupied by a nightclub by the name of "Halley" until 26 November 1997, when the cinema reopened at the hands of an 87-year old Vainikoff. Following Vainikoff's death in 2003, his children Luis and Alba took on the cinema, until they were forced to sell the place in 2006. Proposals for the building to become a hotel were never materialized.

In December 2009, University of Buenos Aires rector Rubén Hallú announced the university would purchase the cinema by US$2.5 million. Cine Cosmos stands next to the Centro Cultural Ricardo Rojas, a cultural center owned and run by the university. The following year, in November 2010, the cinema finally re-opened as Cine Cosmos UBA.

The Cine Cosmos UBA has served as one of the venues for the independent film festival BAFICI in 2011, 2012 and 2022.
