= Ricardo Preve =

Argentine film director

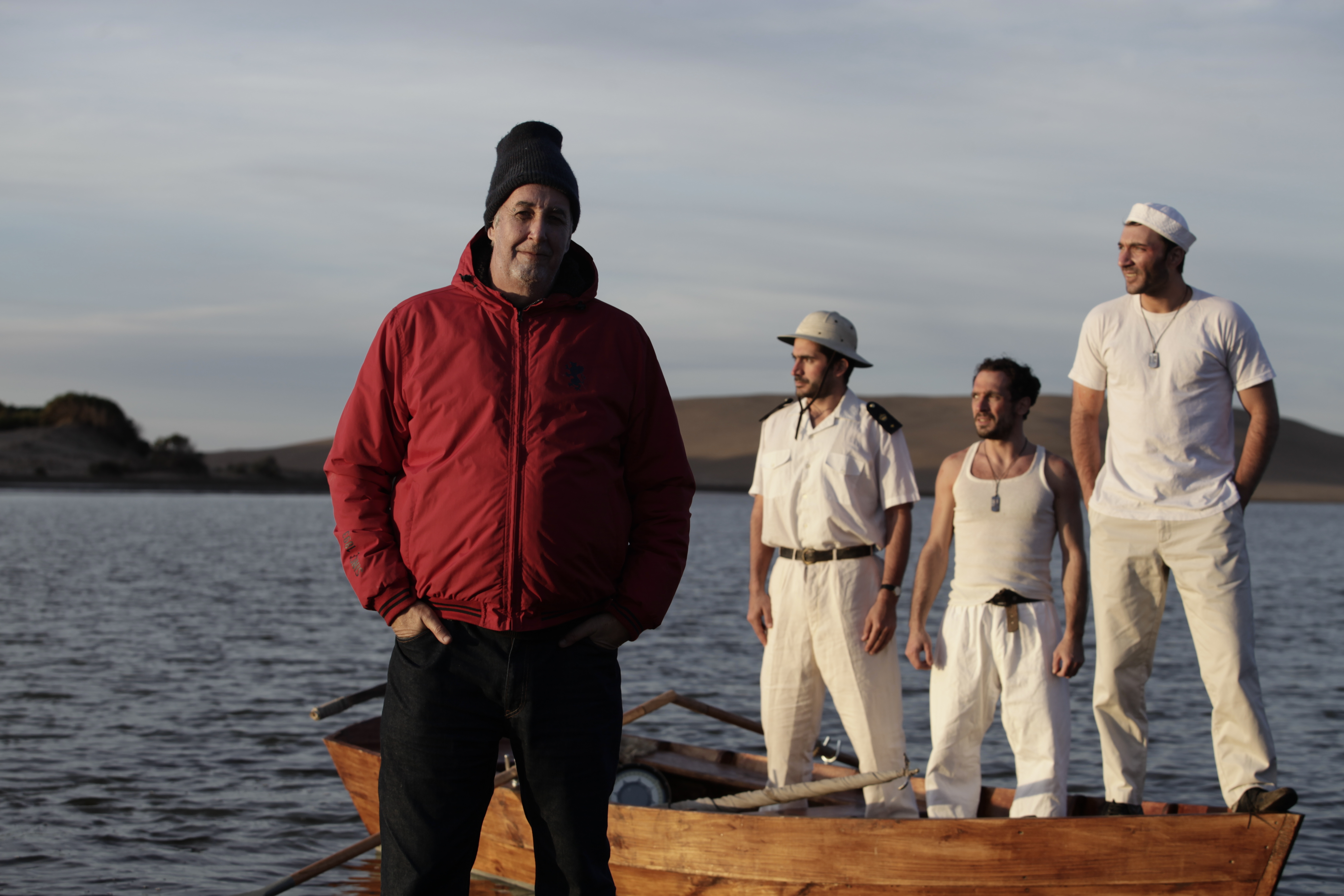
- Preve (left) during the shooting of the film Coming Home.
- Born: October 24, 1957 (age 69); Buenos Aires, Argentina
- Occupations: Film director screenwriter activist photographer
- Years active: 2001–present
- Notable work: Coming Home (2019)

Ricardo Preve (born October 24, 1957, in Buenos Aires) is an Argentine filmmaker, photographer, and activist. Preve began his film career in the early 2000s as an associate producer on some documentaries. Since then, he has worked as a director, producer or scriptwriter in nearly thirty productions for film and television, including The Patagonian Bones (2015), Coming Home (2019), From Sudan to Argentina (2022) and Sometime, Somewhere (2023), which have won awards and recognition at international festivals. Preve is the owner of the audiovisual production companies Ricardo Preve Films LLC and Esto del Cine SRL.

== Early life ==
Preve was born in Buenos Aires, Argentina, in 1957. After studying in his native country, in Italy and in the United States, he obtained the degrees of Agricultural Engineer and Master in Forestry at the Virginia Polytechnic Institute and State University.

He left Argentina in 1976 by crewing a sailboat from Argentina to South Africa. During the journey, the novice Argentine crew and the inexperienced English speaking boat owner ran out of food off the coast of Africa. They subsisted on cooking grease and vitamin pills until they were towed to safety. The experiences of the young Argentinians were reported in sailing magazines in their home country.

After working for twenty years as manager of agroforestry companies, Preve began his career in the film industry in 2001, joining as associate producer in the feature film Adiós, querida Luna, released in 2005 and directed by Fernando Spiner.

== Career ==
=== 2000s ===
In 2003, Preve was the co-producer of the musical documentary Tango, A Strange Turn, about the new generation of tango artists in Argentina. The documentary was directed by Mercedes García Guevara and premiered in Argentina in 2005. In that same year he organized the Argentine Film Festival in conjunction with the Foundation for the Humanities and the University of Virginia. The event took place in April. One year later, Preve registered production credits in the documentary Mondovino. The film, recorded with a manual digital camera in locations in Italy, France, the United States and Argentina, was part of the Official Selection of the 2004 Cannes Film Festival.

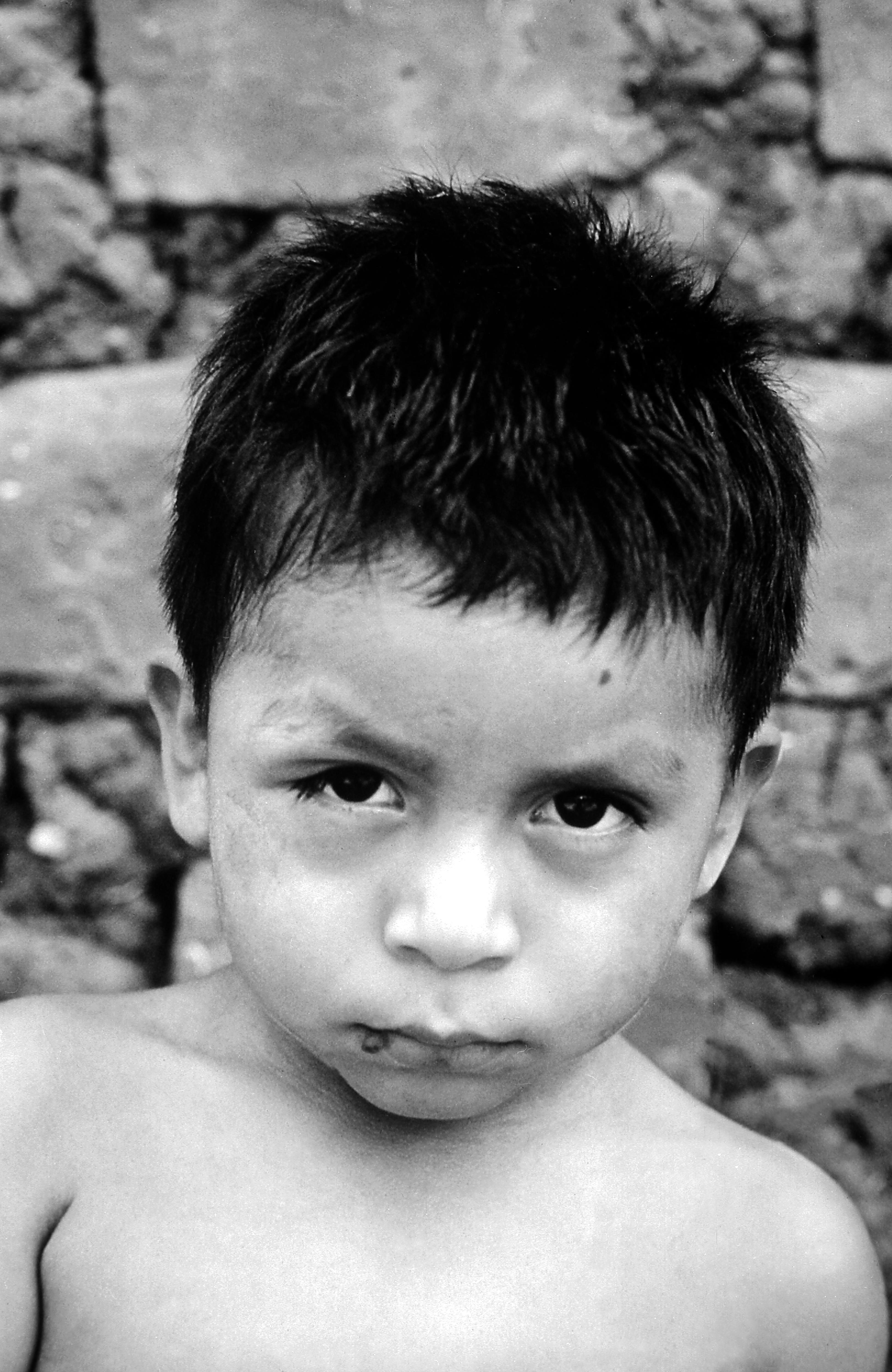
In 2005, Preve directed the documentary Chagas: A Hidden Affliction, about the Chagas disease. In the picture, a child suffering from the disease.

His debut as a director came in 2005 with Chagas: A Hidden Affliction, a documentary that deals with the subject of Chagas disease and its spread. The film, which was supported by the humanitarian organization Doctors without Borders, was filmed in Argentine provinces like Santiago del Estero, Salta and Jujuy, and featured testimonies from medical specialists, researchers and people suffering from the disease. During 2006 Preve wrote, directed and produced the short documentary Esperanza Means Hope and worked as executive producer of the breast cancer based documentary Summer Running: The Race to Cure Breast Cancer, directed by American filmmaker Scott Mactavish and starring actress Sissy Spacek.

Preve wrote and directed two short fiction films: La noche antes in 2006 and La notte prima in 2007. The films, which tell the story of the last night in the life of Martín Miguel de Güemes (a military and political figure who played a key role in Argentina's War of Independence) and Anita Garibaldi (known as "the heroine of the two worlds") respectively, won recognition at film events in Argentina and internationally. In 2008, the filmmaker collaborated with National Geographic in the production of the TV show Darwin's Secret Notebooks, providing logistics and production services in Argentina, Uruguay and Ecuador. The series was broadcast by the channel on February 10, 2009. His partnership with the network continued, playing roles of production and research in the television documentaries Child Mummy Sacrifice (about the preserved bodies of three Inca children found in the province of Salta), Ghosts of Machu Picchu (broadcast on PBS), Twins (about the experiments carried out by Josef Mengele) and Are We There Yet?: World Adventure (children's series broadcast by National Geographic Kids in Brazil). Child Mummy Sacrifice won an Emmy nomination in the category of "Best Lighting and Scenic Design".

On December 4, 2009, his first fiction feature film, José Ignacio was released. The film, co-produced between Uruguay and Argentina, was part of the official selection of the Punta del Este International Film Festival, as well as the Virginia Film Festival, the Levante Film Festival and the Strasbourg International Film Festival.

=== 2010s ===
In 2011 Preve wrote the script for the Argentine environmental series Diary of a Solar Car and began work on the first season of the Uruguayan TV fiction series Garzón, a modern adaptation of Cervantes' Don Quixote, filmed in a small town in Uruguay, which Preve directed and wrote. A year later, he was again interested in Chagas disease, producing and directing the television special Chagas: A Silent Killer. Broadcast by Al Jazeera in April 2013, this production featured renowned soccer player Lionel Messi, who dedicated a few words to the project through a video that was shown at an event in Cochambamba, Bolivia.

In 2013, the filmmaker became involved as the director and co-scriptwriter in the TV series El francés, filmed in Punta del Este, Uruguay, and released in late 2014 in that country. Also in 2014, Preve produced and directed a series of videos filmed in Kenya in support of Drugs for Neglected Diseases Initiative. A year later, he produced, directed and wrote a new documentary, entitled The Patagonian Bones, about the discovery of the remains of the first Welsh woman who died in Patagonia in 1865. The film was broadcast on Argentine public television. The Patagonian Bones was successful at international festivals, winning awards and nominations at events like Accolade Global Film Competition in California, Nuevas Miradas en la Televisión Argentina, Latitude Film Awards, London International Motion Picture Awards and North European International Film Festival, among others.

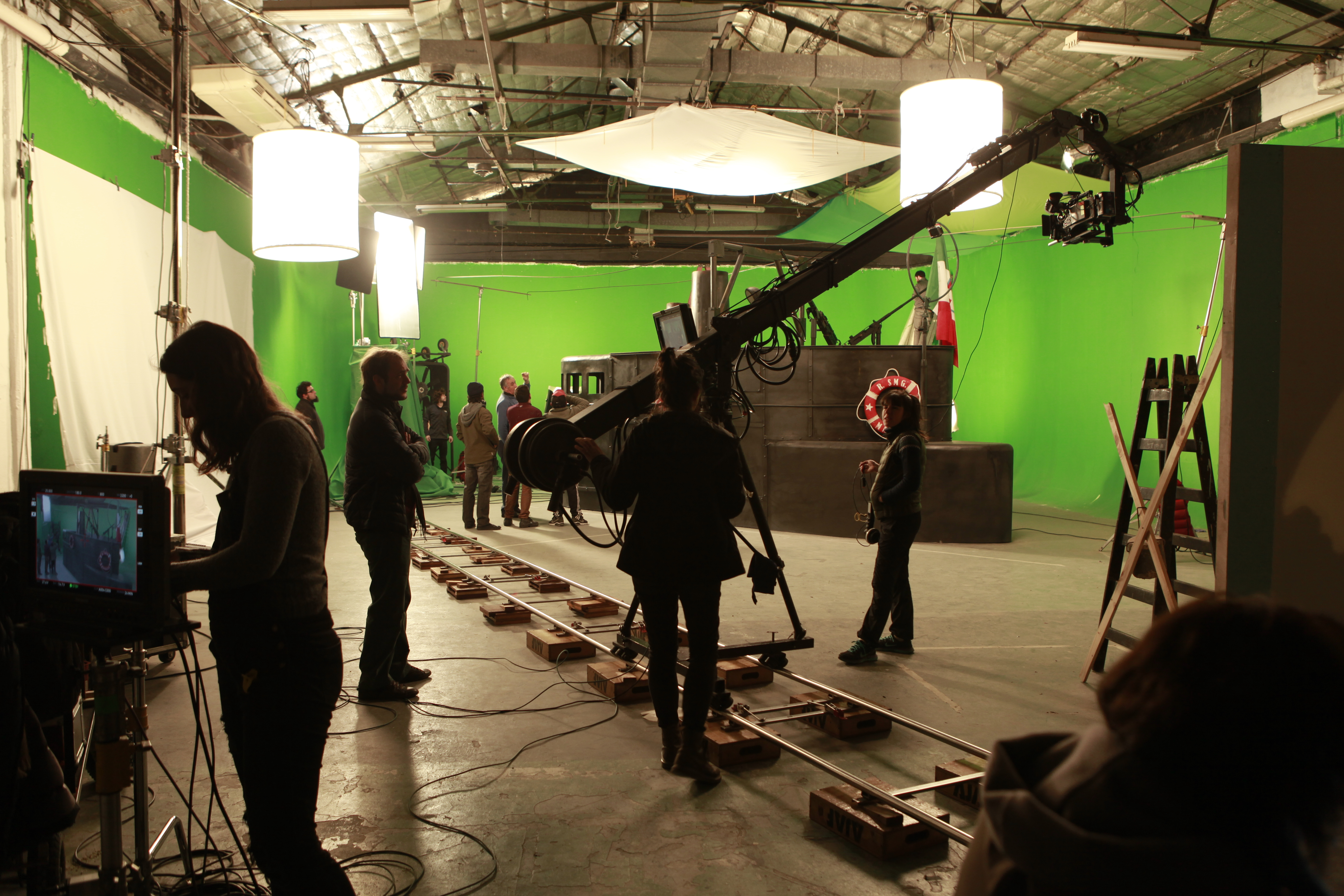
In 2019 the film Coming Home was released, about the repatriation of the remains of an Italian sailor who died in World War II. The image shows the replica of the submarine used in the film.

In 2016 Preve got involved in a new project, the documentary Looking for Marie Anne, based on the search for the remains of Marie Anne Erize, a French-Argentine model who belonged to the Montoneros urban guerrilla and who mysteriously disappeared in October 1976. After five years of work, in 2018 Preve wrote, directed and produced a new feature film, Coming Home, which recounts the events of the repatriation of the remains of Carlo Acefalo, an Italian sailor who died during World War II, from a desert island in the Red Sea to his native country. Between 2018 and 2019, Coming Home won numerous awards at film events in Uruguay, United Kingdom, Spain and United States.

=== 2020s ===
In 2021, Preve produced and directed From Sudan to Argentina in the United States, Argentina and Sudan. The feature documentary tells the story of the Argentine Historian and Egyptologist Abraham Rosenvasser, as leader of a UNESCO sponsored French-Argentine archeological mission in 1961-1963. The mission involved saving the treasures of the temple of Aksha in northern Sudan, before they were destroyed by the waters of the Aswan dam in Egypt, which was being built at that time. The film was shown in various international film festivals, and received awards and special mentions. The theatrical release was in Buenos Aires, Argentina, on November 3, 2022.

In 2023, Preve was awarded the Governor Gerald L. Baliles Founder's Award at the 36th Virginia Film Festival, as a recognition for "excellence in Virginia filmmaking". At the same festival, Preve had the world premiere of his feature documentary Sometime, Somewhere about the Hispanic migrant community in Virginia. The film looks at who are the people that in some cases walk across continents and international borders to make it to the United States, what happens when they arrive, and what the future holds for them.

In 2026, Preve wrote and directed the documentary A Price We Have to Pay, which explored the disappearance of Argentine journalist Ignacio Ezcurra in Saigon, South Vietnam, in May 1968. The film, which presented evidence regarding those potentially responsible for his death, featured participation from Ezcurra's family, as well as journalists and historians. It also received a nomination in the international competition at the 41st Mar del Plata International Film Festival, in the best feature film category.

A Grayling Never Dies is the next project by Preve. The film, in which he will work as director, producer and screenwriter, is based on the adventures of the English outlaw Helen Greenhill in Patagonia in the late 19th and early 20th centuries. The script for A Grayling Never Dies has won international awards at events in Europe and the United States.

== Activism ==
Preve has made a name for himself as a Chagas activist, raising awareness about the deadly disease in coordination with the Drugs for Neglected Diseases Initiative (DNDi) organization.

He made his debut as a professional photographer in 2010, donating a portion of the proceeds from his first photo exhibit about the African goddess "Iemanja" to the Doctors Without Borders organization in light of the recent catastrophic earthquake in Haiti. Later his photographs were gathered by the UNESCO for the exhibit named "Afrodescendants / Prints and Identities", and then exhibited in Brazil, Uruguay and Argentina.

== Filmography ==
Year	Title	Role	Notes
2004	Mondovino	Co-producer	Documentary
2005	Adiós, querida Luna	Associate producer	Feature film
2005	Tango: A Strange Turn	Co-producer	Documentary
2005	Chagas: A Hidden Affliction	Director, producer and writer	Documentary
2005	Summer Running: The Race to Cure Breast Cancer	Executive producer	Documentary
2006	Esperanza Means Hope	Director, producer and writer	Documentary
2006	La noche antes	Director, producer and writer	Short film
2007	La notte prima	Director, producer and writer	Short film
2008	Sampoorna	Producer	Documentary
2009	Darwin: The Secret Notebooks	Producer	TV movie
2009	José Ignacio	Writer and producer	Feature film
2009	Child Mummy Sacrifice	Co-producer	TV series
2009	Twins	Producer	TV series
2010	Ghosts of Machu Picchu	Producer and director	TV series
2011	Are We There Yet?: World Adventure	Producer	TV series
2011	Diary of a Solar Car	Writer	TV series
2012	Garzón	Writer and director	TV series
2013	Chagas: A Silent Killer	Director, producer and writer	TV series
2014	El francés	Director and writer	TV series
2014	Chrome Underground	Producer	TV series
2014	World AIDS Day	Director and producer	Video
2015	The Patagonian Bones	Director, producer and writer	Documentary
2016	Looking for Marie Anne	Director and writer	Documentary
2019	Coming Home	Director, producer and writer	Feature film
2019	Civilization Blues	Actor	Feature film
2022	From Sudan to Argentina	Director, producer and writer	Feature film
2023	Sometime, Somewhere	Director, producer and writer	Documentary
2023	A Grayling Never Dies	Director, producer and writer	Feature film
2026	A Price We Have to Pay	Director, producer and writer	Documentary

== Awards and nominations ==
Year	Award	Category	Title or recipient	Result
2007	Mar del Plata International Film Festival	Official Selection «Latin America in Progress»	La noche antes	Nominated
2008	Chennai International Short Film Festival	Best International Short Film	La notte prima	Won
2009	Emmy Awards	Lighting and Scenic Design	Child Mummy Sacrifice	Nominated
2015	Accolade Global Film Competition, California	Merit Award: Feature Documentary	The Patagonian Bones	Won
2016	Nuevas Miradas en Televisión, Buenos Aires	Best Production	The Patagonian Bones	Won
2016	Nuevas Miradas en Televisión, Buenos Aires	Best Original Score	The Patagonian Bones	Nominated
2018	Latitude Film Awards, London	Best Feature Documentary	The Patagonian Bones	Won
2019	North European International Film Festival, London	Best Story	The Patagonian Bones	Won
2019	North European International Film Festival, London	Best Educational and Scientific Film	The Patagonian Bones	Nominated
2019	London International Motion Picture Awards	Best Feature Documentary	The Patagonian Bones	Nominated
2018	Festival de Cine Latino de Punta del Este	Best Documentary	Coming Home	Won
2018	Festival de Cine Latino de Punta del Este	Career Award	Coming Home	Won
2018	Latitude Film Awards, London	Best Feature Documentary	Coming Home	Won
2018	Latitude Film Awards, London	Best Music	Coming Home	Won
2019	Accolade Global Film Competition, California	Best Feature Documentary, Cinematography and Creativity	Coming Home	Won
2019	Accolade Global Film Competition, California	Originality, Concept and Music	Coming Home	Won
2019	Los Angeles Motion Picture Festival, California	Best Documentary Director	Coming Home	Won
2019	Los Angeles Motion Picture Festival, California	Best International Documentary	Coming Home	Won
2019	South European International Film Festival, Valencia	Best Educational and Scientific Film	Coming Home	Won
2019	South European International Film Festival, Valencia	Best Feature Documentary	Coming Home	Nominated
2019	South European International Film Festival, Valencia	Best Cinematography in a Documentary	Coming Home	Nominated
2019	South European International Film Festival, Valencia	Best Special Effects or Design	Coming Home	Nominated
2019	South European International Film Festival, Valencia	Best Original Music	Coming Home	Nominated
2019	London International Motion Picture Awards	Best Feature Documentary	Coming Home	Nominated
2019	Dumbo Film Festival, New York	Best Feature Documentary	Coming Home	Nominated
2019	Madrid International Film Festival	Best Feature Documentary Director	Coming Home	Nominated
2019	Madrid International Film Festival	Best Feature Documentary	Coming Home	Nominated
2020	VI Sudan Independent Film Festival, Khartoum	Official Selection	Coming Home	Nominated
2020	Impact Doc Awards, California	Merit Award - Best Feature Documentary	Coming Home	Won
2020	Puglia International Film Festival, Polignano a Mare, Italy	Best Feature Documentary	Coming Home	Won
2019	CKF International Film Festival, London	Best Original Script Feature Fiction	A Grayling Never Dies	Won
2019	Prisma Screenwriting Awards, Rome	Official Selection – Original Script Feature Fiction	A Grayling Never Dies	Won
2019	American Screenwriters Conference, Sacramento	Official Selection – Original Script Feature Fiction	A Grayling Never Dies	Won
2019	South Europe International Film Festival, Valencia	Original Script Feature Fiction	A Grayling Never Dies	Won
2019	The European Independent Film Awards, London	Best Feature Script	A Grayling Never Dies	Won
2022	Virginia Film Festival, United States	Official Selection	From Sudan to Argentina	Nominated
2022	Festival LatinUy, Uruguay	Audience Award for Best Film	From Sudan to Argentina	Nominated
2022	Festival LatinUy, Uruguay	Best Documentary	From Sudan to Argentina	Nominated
2022	International Arab-African Documentary Film Festival, Morocco	Best Documentary	From Sudan to Argentina	Won
2022	Fusion International Film Festival, England	Best Director in a Feature Documentary	From Sudan to Argentina	Won
2022	Fusion International Film Festival, England	Best Cinematography in a Documentary	From Sudan to Argentina	Won
2022	Fusion International Film Festival, England	Best Feature Documentary	From Sudan to Argentina	Nominated
2022	Fusion International Film Festival, England	Best Original Music	From Sudan to Argentina	Nominated
2022	Fusion International Film Festival, England	Best History	From Sudan to Argentina	Nominated
2022	Fusion International Film Festival, England	Best Scientific and Educational Film	From Sudan to Argentina	Nominated
2023	Out of Africa International Film Festival, Kenya	Official Selection	From Sudan to Argentina	Nominated
2023	International Hispanic Film Festival, Delaware, United States	Cinematography	From Sudan to Argentina	Won
2023	International Hispanic Film Festival, Delaware, United States	Sound Editing	From Sudan to Argentina	Won
2023	International Hispanic Film Festival, Delaware, United States	Original Script	From Sudan to Argentina	Won
2023	International Hispanic Film Festival, Delaware, United States	Original Concept	From Sudan to Argentina	Won
2023	Ismailia International Film Festival for Documentaries and Short Films, Egypt	Official Selection	From Sudan to Argentina	Nominated
2023	History, Arts and Sciences International Doc Fest, Athens	Best Archeological Documentary	From Sudan to Argentina	Won
2023	Virginia Film Festival	Governor Gerald L. Baliles Founder's Award	Ricardo Preve	Won
2023	Golden Gate International Film Festival	Best Cinematography	Sometime, Somewhere	Nominated
2023	Golden Gate International Film Festival	Best Foreign Film	Sometime, Somewhere	Won
2023	Festival LatinUy, Uruguay	Best Documentary	Sometime, Somewhere	Won
2023	Antigua Academy Film Festival	Best International Documentary Honorific Mention	Sometime, Somewhere	Won
2024	Iberoamerican Film Festival Miami	Best Documentary	Sometime, Somewhere	Nominated
2026	Mar del Plata International Film Festival	Best Feature Film	A Price We Have to Pay	Nominated

== Honors ==

Gold Medal of Merit of the Italian Navy

«Outstanding director of extraordinary professionalism and passion always dedicated to environmental and historical themes» — March 3, 2020.

On November 28, 2024, under resolution 806/24, the Legislature of the Autonomous City of Buenos Aires, Argentina declared him an Outstanding Cultural Personality.
