= Coming Home (2018 film) =

- Directed by: Ricardo Preve
- Written by: Ricardo Preve
- Produced by: Ricardo Preve
- Cinematography: Giulia Scintu
- Edited by: Rolando Rauwolf
- Music by: Andrés Rubinsztejn
- Production companies: Ricardo Preve Films; Esto del Cine SRL
- Release date: November 7, 2018 (Latin Film Festival)
- Running time: 88 minutes
- Countries: Argentina; Italy; Sudan
- Language: Italian

Coming Home (Spanish title: Volviendo a casa) is a 2018 Argentine film directed and written by Ricardo Preve. Defined by Preve as a docufiction production, Coming Home is based on the story of Carlo Acefalo, an Italian sailor who died in a desert island during World War II and whose remains were repatriated to his native country in 2018. The film had a successful run at international festivals, winning awards and nominations.

== Plot ==
During World War II, the Italian submarine Macalle was shipwrecked in the Red Sea, near the coast of Sudan. 45 crew members ended up on a deserted island. NCO Carlo Acefalo died on the island, being buried by his mates there. Nearly 80 years later, a team arrives at the site and rescues Carlo's remains, taking them back to his home village, Castiglione Falletto, for a funeral ceremony attended by almost the entire village.

== Background, production and release ==
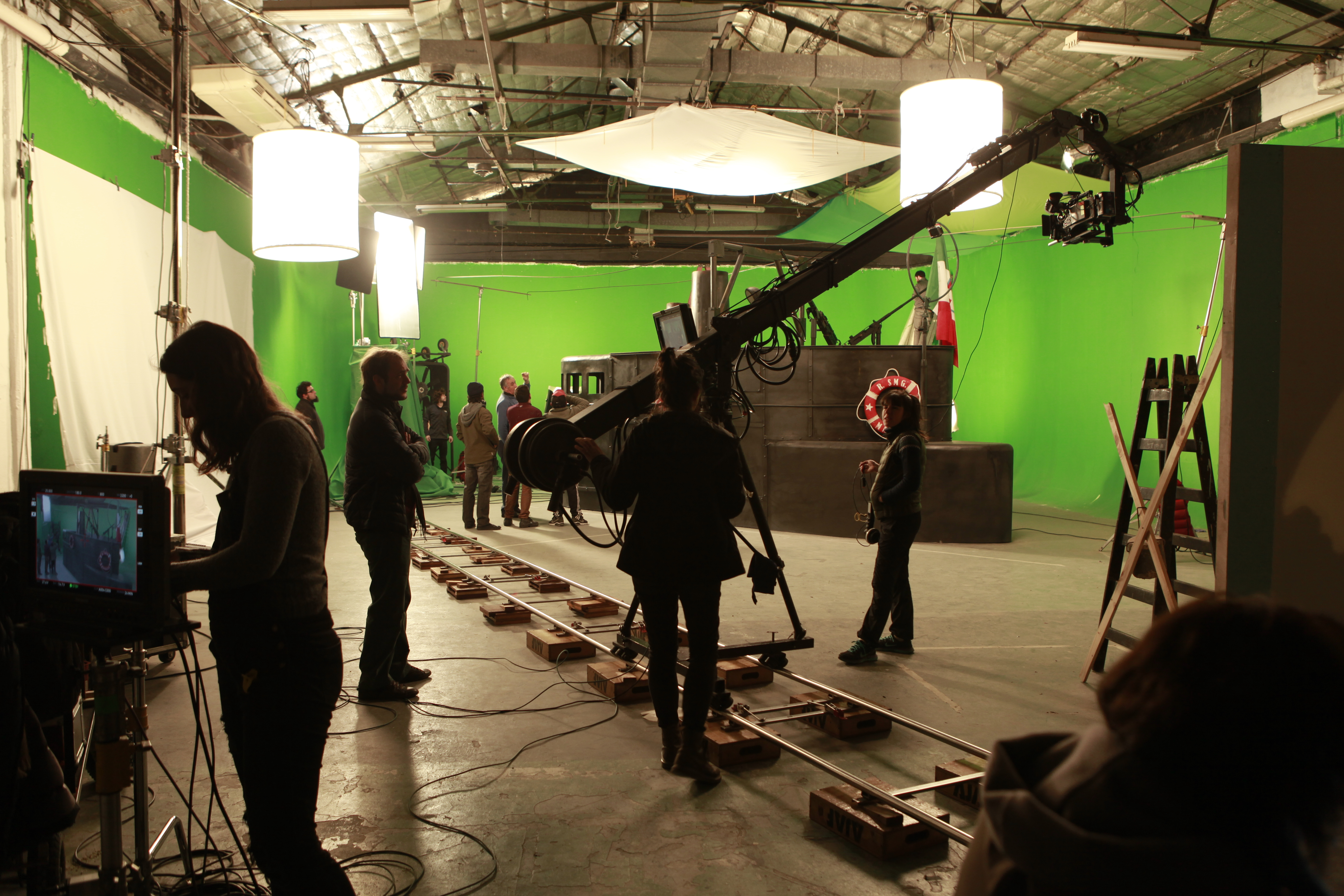
Recreation of the submarine Macallé, used in the film.

Preve, a certified archaeological diver, became interested in the project while making a photo session of sharks near the coast of Sudan. On one of his expeditions, the filmmaker found some pieces of the Macalle submarine. His subsequent efforts focused on locating the body of NCO Carlo Acefalo, who died and was buried by his colleagues on a desert island.

In 2017, historical recreations for the film were shot outdoors in the province of Buenos Aires. In that same year, the team moved to Sudan and attended the exhumation and subsequent transfer of the NCO's body, recording each event for the film. After five years of work, in 2018 the documentary began its tour of festivals and events such as the Latitude Film Awards in London and the Latin Film Festival in Punta del Este, Uruguay, where it began to garner awards and recognition. In July 2019, Coming Home had its premiere in Argentine cinemas.

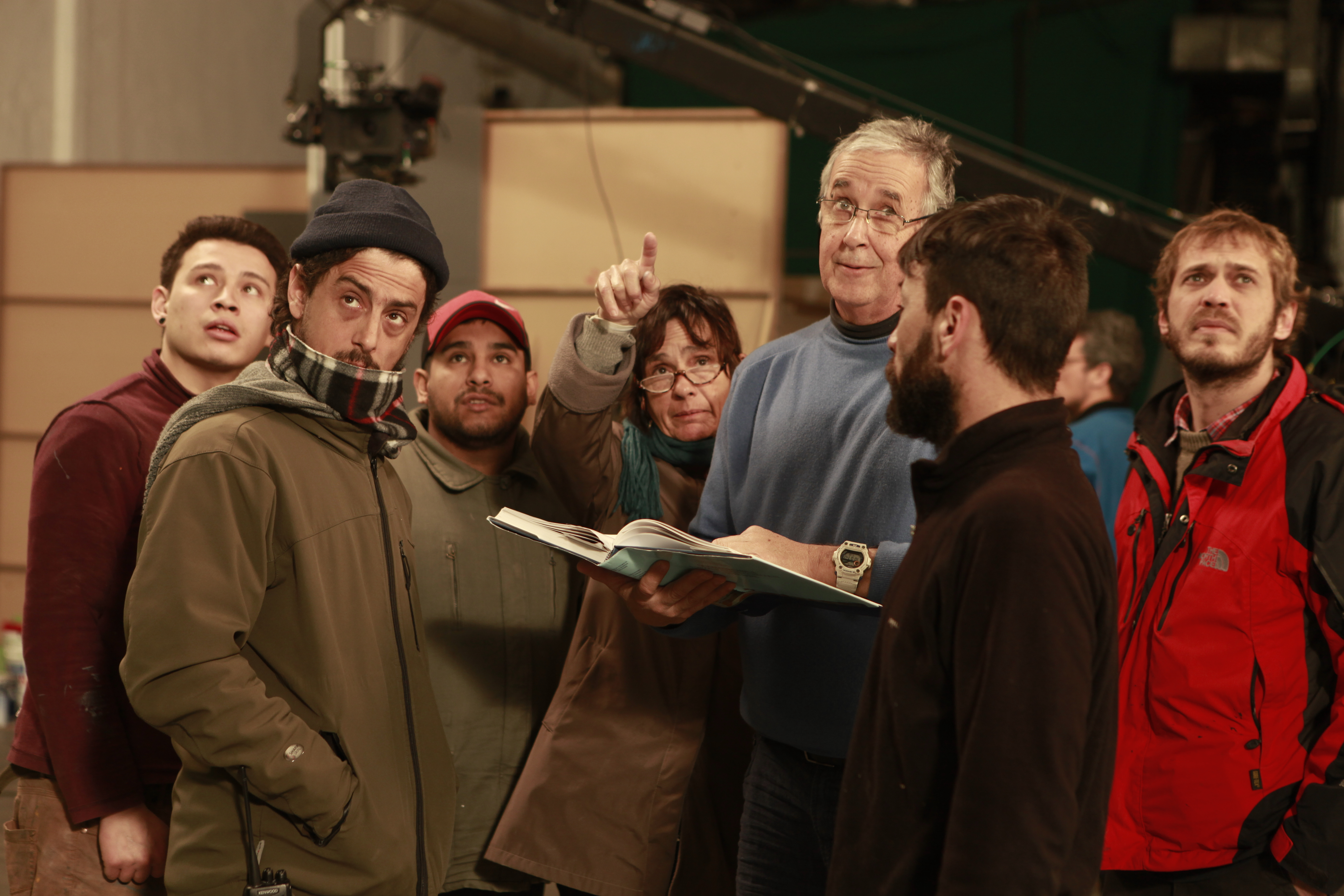
Backstage of the film, 2017.

The film was sponsored by the National Institute of Cinema and Audiovisual Arts and was financed through a crowdfunding campaign. The Argentine Navy lent out nautical implements that helped build the replica of the submarine. About his work, Preve said:

For me, this film was necessary. After making contact with this story, it became imperative to record the search, and return the remains of the NCO to the family, and the documentary was an essential tool to reconstruct the story.

== Reception ==
Coming Home was well received by the critics. Adolfo Martínez of La Nación described it as "sublime because of its emotional scenes and recalls the tragedy that occurred in our country with the ARA San Juan"». Laura Pacheco of Escribiendo Cine said: "This story moves people to tears for many reasons, it has a heart, because the author's voice is constantly present". Leonardo D'Esposito said in his review for magazine Noticias: "Coming home is a human adventure told with the precision that a good story requires, without falling into dramatic undertones and keeping in mind in each scene what really matters". Juan Pablo Cinelli of Página/12 praised Ricardo Preve's work, stating that "the director manages to transmit the adventurous passion that seems to have driven him to carry out this project". Pablo Arahuete of Cinefreaks stated that "the introduction of testimonies and extremely enriching talks brings added value to a very careful and rigorous work".

== In popular culture ==
In June 2021, in the edition 2,309 of the Italian comic strip magazine Skorpio, a story entitled "The 44" was published as an adaptation of the documentary and drawn by the Argentine graphic artist Oscar "Oski" Yanez, who was the artist responsible for the drawing of the storyboards for Coming Home. The comic strip compares the story of the Italian submarine Macallé with that of the Argentine submarine A.R.A. San Juan, which sank in 2017.

== Awards and nominations ==
Year	Award	Category	Result
2018	Punta del Este Latin Film Festival	Best Documentary	Won
2018	Punta del Este Latin Film Festival	Career Award (Ricardo Preve)	Won
2018	Latitude Film Awards, London	Best Documentary Feature Film	Won
2018	Latitude Film Awards, London	Best Music	Won
2019	Accolade Global Film Competition, California	Best Documentary Feature Film, cinematography and creativity	Won
2019	Accolade Global Film Competition, California	Originality, concept and music	Won
2019	Los Angeles Motion Picture Festival, California	Best Documentary Director (Ricardo Preve)	Won
2019	Los Angeles Motion Picture Festival, California	Best International Documentary	Won
2019	South European International Film Festival, Valencia	Best Educational and Scientific Film	Won
2019	South European International Film Festival, Valencia	Best International Documentary	Nominated
2019	South European International Film Festival, Valencia	Best Cinematography in a Documentary	Nominated
2019	South European International Film Festival, Valencia	Best special effects or design	Nominated
2019	South European International Film Festival, Valencia	Best original music	Nominated
2019	London International Motion Picture Awards	Best Documentary Feature Film	Nominated
2019	Dumbo Film Festival, New York	Best Documentary Feature Film	Nominated
2019	Madrid International Film Festival	Best Documentary Director (Ricardo Preve)	Nominated
2019	Madrid International Film Festival	Best Documentary Feature Film	Nominated
2020	VI Sudan Independent Film Festival, Khartoum, Sudan	Official Selection	Nominated
2020	Impact Doc Awards, California	Merit Award, Best Feature Documentary	Won
2020	Puglia International Film Festival, Polignano a Mare, Italy	Best Feature Documentary	Won
