= Issraa El-Kogali =

Sudanese-Swedish filmmaker and screenwriter

- Born: Khartoum
- Education: Royal Swedish Academy of Fine Arts
- Occupations: Screenwriter; Film director

Issraa El-Kogali, sometimes also Issraa Elkogali Häggström (Arabic: إسراء الكوقلي, born in Khartoum, Sudan), is a Swedish–Sudanese screenwriter and film director. She studied performing and visual arts in the United Kingdom, the US and Sweden. Since the early 2010s, she has become known for her multimedia installations and other artistic projects, including film, photography and creative writing, mainly focusing on her native Sudan.

== Life and career ==
El-Kogali studied performing and visual arts as a graduate student in the UK, and later in the US. On visits to her native Sudan, she travelled widely, collecting her artistic impressions of the country's ethnic and geographic diversity. Following this, her multimedia installation of 2011 Nora's Cloth was inspired by women in Khartoum who were producing traditional fabrics with religious or cultural significance. In 2012, El-Kogali became the first student from Sudan at the Royal Swedish Academy of Fine Arts. Further, she obtained a writing residency by the National Swedish Touring Theatre.

In 2010, El-Kogali participated in workshops for young Sudanese filmmakers organized by the German cultural centre (Goethe-Institut) in Sudan. This resulted in her first short documentary film about young Sudanese musicians and their culture titled In Search of Hip Hop. This film was produced by the Sudan Film Factory and shown at international film festivals.

The 2013 short documentary The Two Sudans about the recently separated countries of South Sudan and Sudan was presented at the Berlinale talents section of the Berlin International Film Festival. In this collaborative project, El-Kogali participated along other Sudanese filmmakers such as Alyaa Musa.

In her 2019 essay Art for the Revolution: How Artists Have Changed the Protests in Sudan, she wrote about her own impressions of Sudan's political and social recent history, as well as about the contributions of Sudanese artists such as Khalid Albaih, Alaa Satir, Enas Satir and Dar Al-Naim Mubarak to the 2019 Sudanese revolution.

In 2020, she wrote the scenario and worked as executive producer of the award-winning short fiction film A Handful of Dates, based on the short story of the same name by Sudanese writer Tayeb Salih. This film was presented in official competition at the Sudan Independent Film Festival and the Pan African Film Festival 2020 in Los Angeles.

In the 2023 feature film Goodbye Julia by Sudanese filmmaker Mohamed Kordofani, El-Kogali participated as co-producer for the Swedish company Riverflower. The film was presented at the section Un Certain Regard and won the Prix de la Liberté (Freedom Prize) at the 2023 Cannes Film Festival.

== Filmography ==
=== Short films ===
- In Search of Hip Hop, documentary, 11 minutes (2010)
- The Two Sudans, collaborative film project, 4 minutes (2013)
- A Handful of Dates, short fiction film, 15 minutes (2020)

== See also ==
- Cinema of Sudan
