= Gadalla =

Gadalla is a surname. Notable people with the surname include:

- John Gadalla (born 1980), Danish footballer
- Moustafa Gadalla (born 1944), Egyptian civil engineer and Egyptologist
- Shahinaz Gadalla, physician-scientist and cancer epidemiologist

== See also ==
- Gadalla Gubara (1920–2008), Sudanese cameraman
