= Khartoum (2025 film) =

2025 Sudanese documentary film

- Festival release poster
- Arabic: الخرطوم
- Directed by: Anas Saeed; Rawia Alhag; Ibrahim Snoopy Ahmad; Adarsh Swaroop; Timeea Mohamed Ahmed; Philip Cox
- Written by: Philip Cox
- Produced by: Giovanna Stopponi; Talal Afifi
- Edited by: Yousef Hayyan Jubeh
- Music by: James Preston
- Production companies: Native Voice Films; Sudan Film Factory; BBC Storyville; Gisa Productions; Ayin Network
- Release date: 27 January 2025 (Sundance)
- Running time: 80 minutes
- Countries: Sudan; United Kingdom; Germany; Qatar
- Languages: Arabic; English

Khartoum (Arabic: الخرطوم) is a 2025 documentary film directed by Anas Saeed, Rawia Alhag, Ibrahim Snoopy Ahmad and Timeea Mohamed Ahmed, with Philip Cox serving as creative director and writer. It documents the survival and quest for freedom through dreams, rebellion, and civil strife of five Khartoum residents, who were compelled to flee Sudan for other countries in East Africa due to the ongoing violence in the Sudanese civil war, which have started in 2023.

The film had its world premiere in the World Documentary Competition of the 2025 Sundance Film Festival on 27 January. It was also screened in the Panorama section of the 75th Berlin International Film Festival on 15 February, where it won the Peace Film Prize.

== Synopsis ==
Five citizens of Khartoum, Sudan, share their stories of civil unrest and the military coup that eventually compelled them to escape to neighboring countries.

== Production ==
Directed by four Sudanese filmmakers, Anas Saeed, Rawia Alhag, Ibrahim Snoopy and Timeea M. Ahmed, with the creative director and writer Phil Cox, the film was produced by Native Voice Films and Sudan Film Factory in association with BBC Storyville, Ayin Network, Gisa Productions and Light Echo Pictures. Production was further funded by the Doha Film Institute, Qumra, IDFA Bertha Fund, Berlinale World Cinema Fund, Arab Fund for Arts and Culture, Aflamuna Impact Fund and DocuBox.

Filming began in 2022, documenting the lives and dreams of five very different citizens in Khartoum. In April 2023, the Sudan civil war broke out between the Sudanese Armed Forces (SAR) and the Rapid Support Forces (RSF) militia. Since then, the ongoing war has displaced over ten million people, including filmmakers and the film's main characters.

== Release ==
After its international premiere at the 2025 Sundance Film Festival and its European premiere at the 75th Berlin International Film Festival, Khartoum has been programmed for international film festivals in Geneva, Bolzano, Barcelona and Toronto. It had its Swiss premiere in the section for creative documentaries at the International Film Festival and Forum on Human Rights (FIFDH) on 7 March 2025. Khartoum competed for the FIFDH Geneva Grand Award and was awarded the FIFDH Gilda Vieira de Mello Prize.

On 3 October 2025, it was presented in Spectrum section of 2025 Vancouver International Film Festival, and in 'Strands: Create' section of the 2025 BFI London Film Festival on 11 October 2025. It was also screened in International Perspective and Spotlight on the UK at the São Paulo International Film Festival on 20 October 2025. Also in October 2025, the film was shown at the Human Rights Film Festival Berlin.

== Reception ==
On the review aggregator website Rotten Tomatoes, 94% of 16 critics' reviews are positive, with an average rating of 7.5/10.

Fionnuala Halligan reviewed the film at Sundance for ScreenDaily and wrote that Khartoum deeply immerses itself in the experiences of its subjects. Halligan opined that the turmoil in Sudan was so intense that political context becomes secondary, and so the film shows how war is ultimately about its victims. She further observed that the film was a thematic continuation of the 2024 documentary film Sudan, Remember Us by Hind Meddeb. Concluding her review, she wrote "Sudanese politics are notoriously complex and affected by external players, from Ethiopia to the UAE, but Khartoum simplifies the process by which two generals wage a war and the population dies."

Murtada Elfadl in his review for Variety wrote that Khartoum, much like its group of novice filmmakers, who lacked early exposure to cameras, was raw and unpolished. He added that its true power lies in its authenticity and creative resourcefulness. Concluding his review, Elfadl opined "[The film] functions as both creative work and a healing mechanism for the filmmakers and their protagonists, it is immaterial if they have been to Khartoum or not, audience members are liable to feel that warm glow."

Writing for Middle East Eye, film critic Joseph Fahim called Khartoum "the standout Arab film of the Berlinale". Further he noted the film's "remarkable sensitivity and [...] distinctive lyricism", adding that "Khartoum never solely relies on its urgent politics to lift the picture up; its mature, striking artistry is inseparable from its unsentimental humanism."

The Hollywood Reporter's film critic Lovia Gyarkye noted how the main characters "vividly recount stories about life before and on the cusp of the war. They write and act in brief scenes, attempting to communicate the scale of trauma inflicted by this violence." Despite the brutality of the situation, the film "never entertains despair, help[ing] the participants not only articulate their dreams, but realize them through surrealist narratives." And further: "In this future, hope reigns supreme, routines are no longer a privilege and fighting becomes unimaginable."

The jury of the FIFDH Gilda Vieira de Mello Prize called the determination of the film crew to produce their project "remarkable", taking into account their "limited resources and scant international visibility." They concluded that "Through creative, well-crafted artistic choices and a sincere narrative, especially in the children’s viewpoint, deeply affected by the ongoing conflicts in Sudan, the film helps us better grasp the impact of war on human lives.”

=== Accolades ===
Award	Date	Category	Recipient	Result	Ref.
Sundance Film Festival	2 February 2025	Grand Jury Prize – World Documentary Competition	Khartoum	Nominated	
Berlin International Film Festival	23 February 2025	Panorama Audience Award for Best Documentary Film	Khartoum	3rd Place	
Berlin International Film Festival	23 February 2025	Peace Film Prize	Khartoum	Won	
Berlin International Film Festival	23 February 2025	Amnesty International Film Award – Special Mention	Khartoum	Won	
International Film Festival and Forum on Human Rights	16 March 2025	FIFDH Gilda Vieira de Mello Prize	Khartoum	Won	
Vancouver International Film Festival	17 October 2025	Audience Award, Spectrum Program	Khartoum	Won	

== See also ==
- Cinema of Sudan
- Sudan, Remember Us
