= El Gouna Film Festival =

Annual film festival in Egypt

El Gouna Film Festival مهرجان الجونة السينمائي
- Location: El Gouna, Egypt
- Founded: 22 September 2017; 9 years ago
- Founded by: Naguib Sawiris, Samih Sawiris, Amr Mansi, Bushra Abdallah Rozza, Kamal Zadeh
- Artistic director: Andrew Mohsen
- Language: Egyptian Arabic; English
- Website: elgounafilmfestival.com

Current: October 2026
- October 2027 2025

The El Gouna Film Festival (GFF; Egyptian Arabic: مهرجان الجونة السينمائي) is an annual film festival held in the Red Sea resort city of El Gouna in Egypt each October. Founded in 2017, the event hosts a number of awards. The festival also runs CineGouna, a brand that provides support to Egyptian and Arab filmmakers.

== History ==
The El Gouna Film Festival (GFF) was co-founded in 2017 by Egyptian telecom billionaire Naguib Sawiris, whose brother Samih built the resort, Amr Mansi, Bushra Abdallah Rozza, and Kamal Zadeh.

Its inaugural event started on 22 September. The inaugural artistic director was Intishal Al Timimi, who had previously overseen Arab films at the Abu Dhabi Film Festival until the festival was dissolved in 2015. The psychological thriller Scary Mother, by Georgian first-time director Ana Urushadze, took the Golden Star, the festival's top feature film competition prize, in 2017. Oscar-winning actor-director Forest Whitaker was feted with a lifetime achievement award.

The fifth iteration of the event was held from 14 October 2021.

The festival was cancelled in 2022, after being scheduled to run from 13 to 22 October that year, although its future was not clear. In 2023, Marianne Khoury took over from took over from Amir Ramses as artistic director, but the festival was postponed until December, owing to the Gaza war, and a full festival lineup returned in 2024.

== Description ==
The festival is hosted by the El Gouna Convention and Culture Centre, and focuses on storytelling trends, as well as emerging talents from Egypt and the rest of the world, and increased tourism at the resort.

As of 2026, Amr Mansi is executive director, and Andrew Mohsen is artistic director.

=== CineGouna ===
CineGouna is a festival brand that covers a number of programs designed to support and empower Egyptian and Arab filmmakers, both artistically and financially. As of 2026 there it runs CineGouna Funding, CineGouna Forum, CineGouna Market, CineGouna Emerge, and CineGouna Shorts.

== Awards ==
The following awards are awarded at the festival:

=== Feature Narrative Competition ===
- El Gouna Gold Star for a Narrative Film (Trophy, Certificate and USD 50,000)
- El Gouna Silver Star for Narrative Film (Trophy, Certificate and USD 25,000)
- El Gouna Bronze Star Narrative Film (Certificate, Trophy and USD 15,000)
- El Gouna Star for Best Arab Narrative Film (Trophy, Certificate and USD 20,000)
- El Gouna Star for Best Actor (Trophy and Certificate)
- El Gouna Star for Best Actress (Trophy and Certificate)

=== Feature Documentary Competition ===
- El Gouna Gold Star for a Documentary Film (Trophy, Certificate and USD 30,000)
- El Gouna Silver Star for Documentary Film (Trophy, Certificate and USD 15,000)
- El Gouna Bronze Star Documentary Film (Trophy, Certificate and USD 7,500)
- El Gouna Star for Best Arab Documentary Film (Trophy, Certificate and USD 10,000)

=== Others ===
The Arab Critics Awards for European Films is awarded by Arab Cinema Center at El Gouna.

== Past award winners ==
=== 2017 ===
==== Feature Narrative competition ====
- Golden Star: Scary Mother, Ana Urushadze
- Silver Star: The Insult, Ziad Dower
- Bronze Star: Arrhythmia, Boris Khlebnikov
- Golden Star for Best Arabic Feature Film: Photocopy, Tamer Ashry
- Best Actress: Nadia Kounda, Volubilis
- Best Actor: Daniel Gimenez Cacho, Zama
- Cinema For Humanity Audience Award: Soufra, Thomas Morgan

==== Documentary competition ====
- Golden Star: I Am Not Your Negro, Raoul Peck
- Silver Star: Brimstone and Glory, Viktor Jakovleski
- Bronze Star: Mrs Fang, Wang Bing
- Golden Star For Best Arabic Documentary: I Have a Picture, Mohamed Zedan

==== Short Film competition ====
- Golden Star: Nightshade, Shady El-Hamus
- Silver Star: Merry-Go-Round, Ruslan Bratov
- Bronze Star: Mama Bobo, Robin Andelfinger and Ibrahima Seydi
- El Gouna Star for Best Arab Short Film: Punchline, Christophe M. Saber

=== 2018 ===
==== Feature Narrative competition ====
- Golden Star:A Land Imagined, Yeo Siew Hua
- Silver Star:Ray & Liz, Richard Billingham
- Bronze Star:The Heiresses, Marcelo Martinessi
- El Gouna Star for Best Arabic Narrative Film:Yomeddine, A.B. Shawky
- Special Mention:The Man Who Surprised Everyone, Natasha Merkulova and Aleksey Chupov
- Best Actress:Joanna Kulig, Cold War
- Best Actor:Mohamed Dhrif, Dear Son
- Cinema for Humanity Audience Award:Another Day Of Life; Raúl De La Fuente, Damian Nenow and Yomeddine, A.B. Shawky (joint winners)

==== Feature Documentary competition ====
- Golden Star:Aquarela, Victor Kossakovsky
- Silver Star:Of Fathers and Sons, Talal Derki
- Bronze Star:The Swing, Cyril Aris
- El Gouna Star for Best Arab Documentary Film:Of Fathers and Sons, Talal Derki

==== Short Film competition ====
- Golden Star:Our Song To War, Juanita Onzaga
- Silver Star:Judgement, Raymund Ribay Gutierrez
- Bronze Star:Sheikh's Watermelons, Kaouther Ben Hania
- El Gouna Star for Best Arab Short Film:EyeBrows, Tamer Ashry

=== 2019 Winners ===
==== Feature Narrative competition ====
- Golden Star:You Will Die at Twenty, Amjad Abu Alala
- Silver Star:Corpus Christi, Jan Komasa
- Bronze Star:Adam, Maryam Touzani
- El Gouna Star for Best Arabic Narrative Film:Papicha, Mounia Meddour
- Best Actress:Hend Sabry, Noura's Dream
- Best Actor:Bartosz Bielenia, Corpus Christi
- Cinema for Humanity Audience Award:Les Misérables, Ladj Ly
- FIPRESCI Award:1982, Oualid Mouaness

==== Feature Documentary competition ====
- Golden Star:Talking About Trees, Suhaib Gasmelbari
- Silver Star:143 Sahara Street, Hassen Ferhani
- Bronze Star:Kabul, City in the Wind, Aboozar Amini
- El Gouna Star for Best Arab Documentary Film:Ibrahim: A Fate to Define, Lina Alabed
- NETPAC Award for Best Asian Film:Kabul, City in the Wind, Aboozar Amini

==== Short Film competition ====
- Golden Star:Exam, Sonia K. Haddad
- Silver Star:Ome, Wassim Geagea
- Bronze Star:Flesh, Camila Kater
- El Gouna Star for Best Arab Short Film:Give Up the Ghost, Zain Duraie
- Special Jury Mention:16 December, Álvaro Gago Díaz

=== 2021 ===
==== Feature Narrative competition ====
- Golden Star:The Blind Man Who Did Not Want to See Titanic, Teemu Nikki
- Silver Star:Sun Down, Michel Franco
- Bronze Star:Captain Volkongov Escaped, Aleksey Chupov, Natasha Merkulova
- El Gouna Star for Best Arabic Narrative Film:Feathers, Omar El Zohairy
- Best Actress:Petri Poikolainen, Playground
- Best Actor:Perri Poikonainen, The Blind Man Who Did Not Want to See Titanic
- Cinema for Humanity Audience Award:Ostrove: Lost Island, Svetlana Rodina, Laurent Stoop
- FIPRESCI Award:Costa Brava, Mounia Akl

==== Feature Documentary competition ====
- Golden Star:Life of Ivana, Renato Borrayo Serrano
- Silver Star:Ostrov - Lost Island, Svetlana Rodina, Laurent Stoop
- Bronze Star:Sabaya, Hogir Hirori
- El Gouna Star for Best Arab Documentary Film:Captains of Za'atari, Ali El Arabi
- NETPAC Award for Best Asian Film:Captain Volkongov Escaped, Aleksey Chupov, Natasha Merkulova

==== Short Film competition ====
- Golden Star:Katia, Andrey Natotcinskiy
- Silver Star:Holy Son, Aliosha Massine
- Bronze Star:On Solid Ground, Jela Hasler
- El Gouna Star for Best Arab Short Film:Cai-Ber, Ahmed Abdelsalam
- Special Mention: actress Aisha Al Rifae for Nour Shams directed by Faiza Ambah

== Side events ==
Pitching Session: CinemaTech by Gemini Africa

Gemini Africa is an Egyptian company extending into Africa and the Middle East for tech startups in an entrepreneurial pitching event under CinemaTech's track. CinemaTech is the first entrepreneurial track bridging the gap between entrepreneurship and filmmaking, with the aim of uplifting the industry by injecting technological solutions offered by startups.

== See also ==
- Egyptian cinema
- List of film festivals
