= Marwa Zein =

Sudanese filmmaker (born 1985)

- Born: Marwa Zein; December 4, 1985 (age 40); Mecca, Saudi Arabia
- Occupation: Film director, Film producer, Scriptwriter
- Years active: from 2008
- Known for: Khartoum Offside (2019) One Week, Two Days! (2016) A Game (2009)
- Website: https://www.marwazein.com/

Marwa Zein (Arabic: مروى زين born 4 December 1985) is a Sudanese film director, scriptwriter and film producer. She is the author of the 2019 documentary, Khartoum Offside, and an advocate of women's rights through her work. She is the founder of ORE Production, a Khartoum-based film production company and one of the seven young filmmakers selected from around the world to attend the Cannes Film Festival 2019 by the International Emerging Film Talent Association (IEFTA).

== Career ==
For her graduation project, Zein wrote, directed and produced the short documentary film, A Game, in 2009, translated into five languages and presented as an official selection in over 30 international festivals globally. At the 2016 Dubai International Film Festival (DIFF), her short film, One Week, Two Days!, starring Yasmin Raies and Amro Saleh, was premiered. It too was featured in various other film festivals.

In 2019, she completed a four-year long project, which she wrote and directed, a sports documentary called Khartoum Offside. It was globally premiered in the 2019 Berlinale Forum in Germany and was listed as one of three notable Sudanese films premiered in 2019 by Media Support. One central message of the film was stated in the introductory lines like this:

“Under the current political Islamic military rule, women are not allowed to play football in Sudan – and we are not allowed to make films – but…”

In producing this film, she defied the Sudanese government's negative attitude towards women's involvement in filmmaking. Although she didn't encounter direct physical assault during the course of making this film, she received some threats of her camera or material possibly being destroyed. Finally, however, she received the necessary clearance for shooting this film. After the political changes brought about by the Sudanese revolution of 2018/19, the film was presented at the opening of the Sudan Independent Film Festival in Khartoum in January 2020.

== Filmography ==
Year	Film	Role	Notes	Ref.
2019	Khartoum Offside	Director, Producer, Writer	Sports documentary	
2016	One Week, Two Days!	Director, Writer	Short film, Drama	
2015	What a lover can be?	Director, Producer	Documentary, Short film	
2013	Culture for All	Director	Documentary, Short film	
2009	A Game	Director, Writer, Co-producer	Short film, Drama	
2008	Randa Shaath	Director, Writer, Producer	Documentary, Short film	

== Accolades ==
Year	Event	Prize	Recipient	Result	Ref.
2020	ASA	2020 ASA Film Prize	Herself, for Khartoum Offside	Runner-up	
2019	AMAA	Best Documentary	Herself, for Khartoum Offside	Won	
2019	CFF	Best Documentary	Herself, for Khartoum Offside	Won	
2019	Berlinale	Best Documentary	Herself, for Khartoum Offside	Nominated	

== See also ==
- Cinema of Sudan
