= Hussein Shariffe =

Sudanese painter and filmmaker (1934–2005)

- Born: July 7, 1934; Omdurman, Sudan
- Died: January 21, 2005 (aged 70)
- Education: Slade School of Fine Art, London
- Alma mater: University of Cambridge
- Known for: painting, film
- Movement: Khartoum School of Modern Art

Hussein Shariffe (7 July 1934 – 21 January 2005, Omdurman, Sudan) was a Sudanese filmmaker, painter, poet and university lecturer at the University of Khartoum. After years of schooling in Khartoum and in Alexandria, Egypt, he studied modern history and fine arts in England, where he had his first exhibition in London's Gallery One in 1957. Back in Sudan in the 1970s, he worked both at the Ministry of Culture and at the Faculty of Arts at the University of Khartoum. In 1973 he began a second artistic career as filmmaker, producing several documentary films and cinematographic essays on subjects such as traditional rites or history in Sudan, as well as on life in exile during his later years in Cairo.

== Biography and artistic career ==
Hussein Shariffe was the son of a medical doctor and his wife, both from families related to Muhammed Ahmed El-Mahdi (1844–1885), the religious and political founder of the Mahdist State. He spent his first years in a small village, where he was instructed in reading and writing Arabic and the Quran. After this, he received his primary education at the secular Ahfad School for boys in Rufu'a, a village on the banks of the Blue Nile, south of Khartoum, that had been founded by the pioneer in Sudanese education Babiker Bedri. After an introduction to fine arts, literature and music at the Catholic Comboni School in Khartoum, he continued his schooling at Victoria College, an elite school in Alexandria, Egypt.

=== Painter ===
In the late 1950s, Shariffe studied Modern History at the University of Cambridge in England, and in 1959, he took a Master's degree at London’s Slade School of Fine Arts, where he studied under Lucian Freud. He won the John Moores Prize for young artists and had his first show in 1957 at London’s Gallery One. The National Portrait Gallery in London holds photographs of Shariffe from this period, sitting in front of his paintings. In his lifetime, he is said to have painted more than 500 paintings, but only few of them have been documented.

=== Filmmaker ===
After his return to Khartoum in 1970, he became known as a filmmaker from the 1970s onwards. In 1973, he was in charge of the film section in the Ministry of Culture and Information in Khartoum, at the same time as Gadalla Gubara and Ibrahim el-Salahi. His first documentary film, The Throwing of Fire, centred on a traditional fertility rite of the Ingessana people in the southern Blue Nile State, celebrating ashes, the sun and good harvests. This experience prompted him to return to the United Kingdom to study film at the National Film and Television School. During this time, he shot Tigers are better looking, adapting a short story by Creole literary modernist Jean Rhys.

Before 1997, Shariffe made several documentaries, such as The Dislocation of Amber, a poetic film about the historical port of Suakin on the Red Sea coast, or Diary in Exile, an account of Sudanese living in exile in Egypt. His films Al-wathiq, inspired by a Sudanese outlaw, and Dawood, about Sudanese singer Abdel Aziz Muhammed Dawood, begun in the early 1980s, were never completed. In 2000, he started work on his last film 'Of dust and rubies', a cinematic rendering of contemporary Sudanese poetry about the experience of exile. (Note: As the Arsenal film institute wrote: "For the following four years, Shariffe, together with his intimate cast and crew, was filming across Egypt, where the filmmaker was forced to live in exile for over a decade because of his political position against the regime in Sudan. The shooting was done on 35mm in selected ten regions across the country including Cairo, Fayoum Desert, Aswan, Sinai, Alexandria, Western Desert, al-Qanatir Gardens, and Dahshour Desert. The unexpected death of Shariffe in January 2005 prohibited him from finishing his work and since then, Of Dust and Rubies is a film on suspension.")

Shariffe’s later life was to be disrupted by political instability in Sudan. Moving between London and Khartoum through the early 1980s, he eventually joined the many compatriots who had fled into exile following the 1989 military coup. His third and final destination in a long life of transnational displacement was Cairo, where he continued an exilic art practice that crossed disciplinary boundaries between film, poetry, literature and painting.

— Birbeck Institute of the Moving Image, Hussein Shariffe (1934 – 2005). Exile and homecoming between London, Cairo and Khartoum

=== Tributes and late recognition ===
In appreciation of his artistic work, the Sudan Independent Film Festival, founded in 2014, is held annually on the anniversary of Shariffe's death.

In 2010, his paintings were exhibited at the Salwa Zeidan Gallery, Abu Dhabi, United Arab Emirates, and in 2017, at the me Collector's room of the Olbricht Foundation in Berlin, Germany. The retrospective exhibition 'The Khartoum School – The Making of the Modern Art Movement in Sudan (1945-present)', presented by the Sharjah Art Foundation, United Arab Emirates, in 2016, showed his paintings alongside other Sudanese artists of this period. - Some of his paintings have also been presented by auction houses like Christie's or Sotheby's. On the latter's online page dedicated to Sudanese painters, his abstract painting Songlines for Bruce Chatwin is presented as a tribute to Shariffe's friend, Bruce Chatwin, the English travel writer and novelist, who visited Sudan in 1965. (Note: Having worked as specialist for assessing paintings for an auction house in London, Chatwin went to see an eye specialist for a trouble in his eyes: “You’ve been looking too closely at pictures,’ he said. ‘Why don’t you swap them for some long horizons?” “Why not?” I said. “Where would you like to go?” “Africa." - "I went to Africa, to the Sudan. My eyes had recovered by the time I reached the airport." Source: Bruce Chatwin, The Songlines. London: Jonathan Cape, 1987, pp. 16-17)

In 2019, the members of a workshop on his last film project Of dust and rubies at the Berlin-based Arsenal Institute for Film and Video Art presented their findings at the Berlin International Film Festival 'Forum Expanded', and Egyptian filmmaker Tamer El Said created a film essay about this project. In 2020, the Birkbeck Institute of the Moving Image (BIMI) in London, in cooperation with the Arsenal Institute, presented online screenings and panel discussions of three of his films.

== Filmography ==
- The Throwing of Fire, 1973
- The Dislocation of Amber, 1975
- Tigers are Better Looking, 1979
- Not the Waters of the Moon, 1985
- Diary in Exile, 1993
- Letters from Abroad, 1997, (not completed)
- Al-Wathiq (not completed)
- Dawood (not completed)
- Of Dust and Rubies, 2000–2005, (not completed)

== See also ==
- Cinema of Sudan
- Visual arts of Sudan
