= Cinema of Sudan =

Produced feature films
- Total: c. 70 (2026)
- Fictional: c. 20
- Documentary: c. 50

Cinema of Sudan refers to both the history and present of the making or screening of films in cinemas or film festivals, as well as to the persons involved in this form of audiovisual culture of the Sudan and its history from the late nineteenth century onwards. It began with cinematography during the British colonial presence in 1897 and developed along with advances in film technology during the twentieth century.

After independence in 1956, a first era of indigenous Sudanese documentary and feature film production was established, but financial constraints and discouragement by the Islamist government led to the decline of cinema from the 1990s onwards. In the 2010s, several initiatives by Sudanese filmmakers both in Khartoum as well as in the Sudanese diaspora have brought about a revival of filmmaking and public interest in film shows in Sudan. Since 2019, a new generation of Sudanese filmmakers such as Hajooj Kuka, Amjad Abu Alala, Suhaib Gasmelbari, Marwa Zein and Suzannah Mirghani have attracted international attention.

== Cinema in colonial Sudan ==
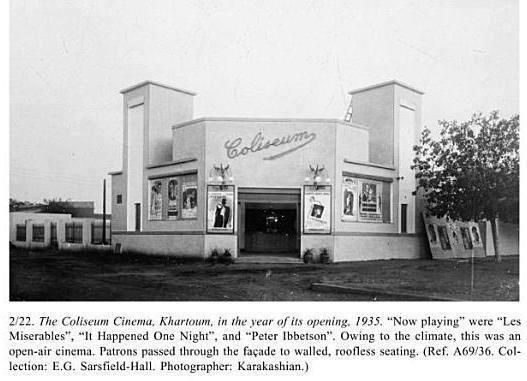
Picture and caption regarding the open air cinema Coliseum in Khartoum, Sudan, 1935

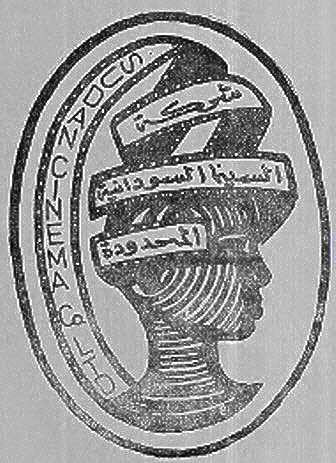
Logo of Sudan Cinema Co Ltd., c. 1940

Sudan saw some of the earliest filmmaking in Africa to take place in the British Empire: John Benett-Stanford, a soldier turned war correspondent, shot footage of British troops in 1897, just before the Battle of Omdurman. This short and silent film was projected and sold in Britain under the title Alarming the Queen's Company of Grenadiers Guards at Omdurman. In 1912, the British colonial authorities made a documentary film of King George V and Queen Mary's visit to the country and screened it in open-air theatres in Khartoum and El Obeid. During the early years of the 20th century, pioneering filmmakers travelled up the Nile from Cairo to Khartoum and beyond, shooting films for curious audiences at home, for example in a documentary showing Lord Kitchener inspecting his troops in Khartoum.

In 1921, the British silent war film The Four Feathers, whose story takes place during the Anglo-Egyptian campaign against the Mahdist State, was partly shot in Sudan. Eight years later, the American silent movie The Four Feathers (1929) was produced for Paramount Pictures, again with some scenes filmed in Sudan. The same story has been turned into several later movies, of which The Four Feathers (1939), filmed on location in Technicolor by Zoltan Korda has been considered as the most "harrowingly beautiful of all desert spectaculars."

Starting in the late 1920s, Greek businessmen, who had also been among the earliest photographers in Sudan, established cinemas for silent films in Khartoum. Local businessmen later founded the Sudan Cinema Corporation, which opened cinemas in other cities and distributed imported films. The magazine El Fajr had weekly pages on science, literature and movies.

In the 1940s, the colonial government employed mobile cinemas on vans and the Sudan Railways’ ‘Public Enlightenment’ Car, trying to influence local audience's perceptions of the Second World War. British officials were concerned about how Sudanese, like colonial subjects in other colonies, would see events in Europe. Desert Victory (1943), a film about the Allies' North African campaign against German Field Marshal Erwin Rommel and the Afrika Korps, and Partners in Victory, a documentary about the Sudan Defense Force in North Africa, were projected for crowds in provincial capitals all over Sudan. These travelling movie shows presented war films and short films about government information and educational themes, made by the mobile Sudanese film-making unit for Sudanese audiences.

In her book "Living with Colonialism: Nationalism and Culture in the Anglo-Egyptian Sudan" historian Heather J. Sharkey describes the influence of photographs and films through the British educational system:

Gordon College served as photography's first point of transfer to Sudanese (as opposed to European) audiences. The college exposed students to a range of film media, including photographically illustrated books, snapshots and studio portraits, magic lanterns […] and narrative (cinematic) film. Because photographs and pictures enabled the boys and Old boys of Gordon College to see and hence to imagine the world, the British Empire, and the Sudan in new ways, visual culture was as important to the development of nationalism as the culture of words.

— Heather J. Sharkey, Living with colonialism: nationalism and culture in the Anglo-Egyptian Sudan

It was precisely in the emerging visual art of documentary films that Gadalla Gubara, reputed to have been the first Sudanese cameraman, was trained for the Colonial Film Unit in Sudan.

== Cinema from independence up to the 2010s ==
=== From 1950s to 1980s ===
When Sudan gained independence in 1956, the new authorities established the Sudan Film Unit to make short educational documentaries and newsreels, shown both in the cinemas of major cities as well as on mobile cinema trucks. In the 1960s, more than 70 cinemas in Khartoum and other major cities showed mainly Indian, Egyptian, American or Italian films, but also news and commercials. Despite the growing number of people who could afford television sets, the popularity of "going to the movies" was considerable, as reflected by Cinema Cinema, a weekly film show on the government-owned Sudan National Broadcasting Corporation television channel that had started in 1962. Further, a magazine in Arabic titled Radio, Television and Theatre was published, with an article about Cinema in Sudan in its 1978 edition. Starting in the late 1960s, Sudanese women also became professionally involved in various activities of radio and television: Wisal Musa Hasan was the first camerawoman in the Sudan Film Unit, as a short documentary clip from the archives of Sudan Memory shows.

In an article about the rise and decline of cinema in the city of Wad Madani, the popularity of "going to the movies" was explained in terms of its importance for public cultural life, providing a "fresh breath of freedom in light of the country's independence." For many urban dwellers, movie shows were the only public forms of entertainment at the time. This applied both to educated and less educated people, as well as to women and girls, who were admitted as families in the company of their male relatives.

The first feature-length film made in Sudan was Hopes and Dreams, directed in 1970 by Ibrahim Mallassy and shot in black and white, with Rashid Mahdi as director of photography. After that, very few feature films were made, mainly due to lack of funding. Hussein Shariffe, a Sudanese painter, poet and lecturer at the Faculty of Arts of Khartoum University, became known as a filmmaker from the 70s onwards. In 1973, he was head of the film section in the Ministry of Culture and Information and directed his first film, The Throwing of Fire, a documentary about a ritual related to the power of fire, celebrated by the Ingessana tribe in the southern Blue Nile State. This new artistic experience prompted him to return to the United Kingdom to study film at the National Film and Television School. Until 1997, Shariffe made several documentaries, for example The Dislocation of Amber, a poetic documentary about the historic port of Suakin on the Red Sea, or Diary in Exile, an account of the life in exile of Sudanese in Egypt. In appreciation of Shariffe's artistic output, the Sudan Independent Film Festival, founded in 2014, is held annually on the anniversary of Shariffe's death.

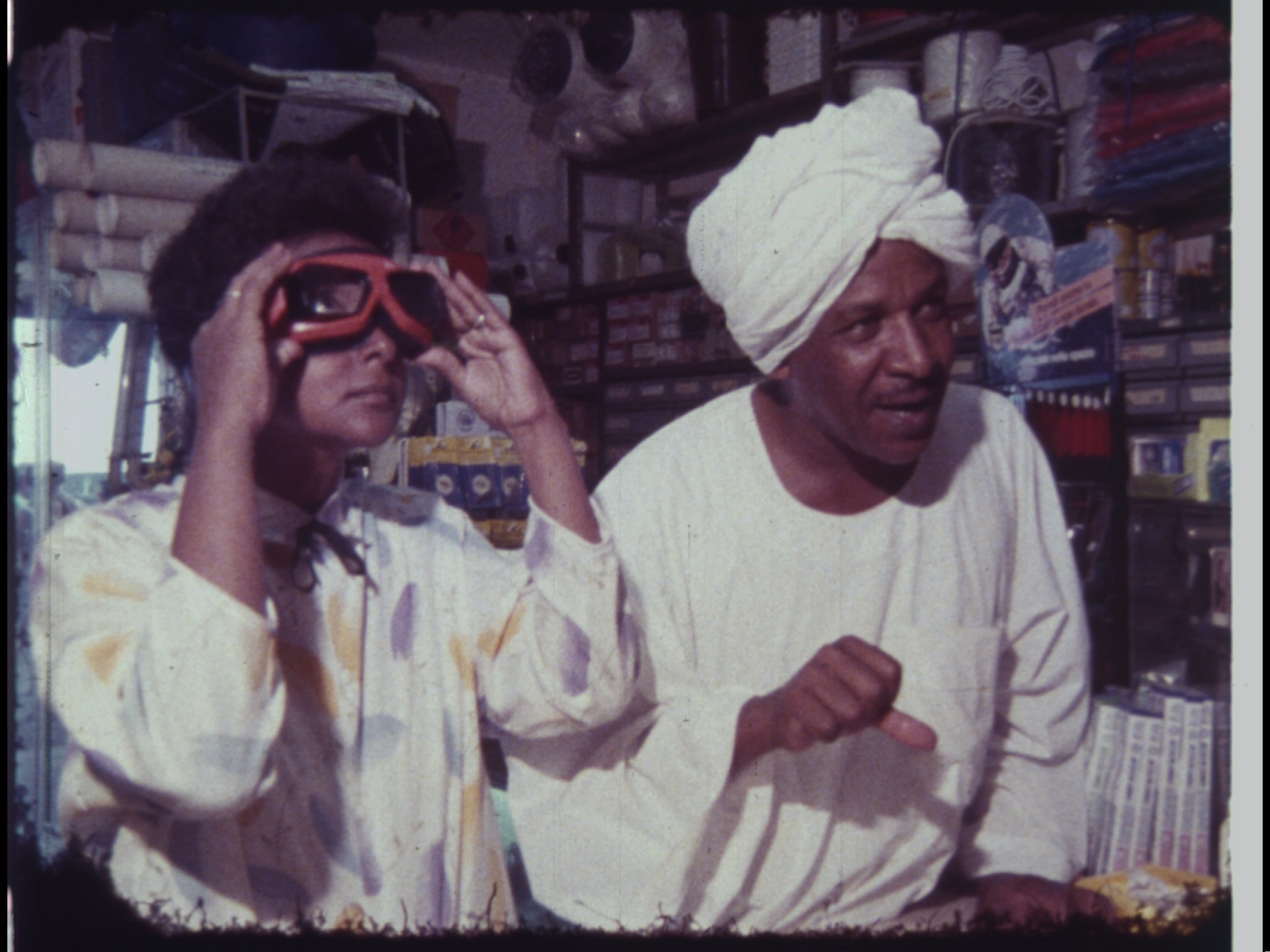
Gadalla Gubara and his daughter Sara Gubara in the film "Viva Sara" (1984)

The Sudanese filmmaker with the most widely ranging work of more than 100 documentaries and newsreels, Gadalla Gubara, also produced feature films, most notably the tribal love story Tajouj in 1979. His daughter, Sara Gadalla Gubara, who studied film making in Cairo as well as through training by her father, assisted him in his private film production company Studio Gad and became the first female filmmaker in Sudan. Sara's film The Lover of Light (2004) is both a metaphor for Gadalla Gubara and for his interest in bringing social issues to light through filmmaking.

Established in 1989, the Sudan Film Group (SFG) in Omdurman, a non-profit organisation promoting film shows and the local film industry was composed of professionals involved in filmmaking, artistic production and development communication. The SFG has produced films, organises shows, trainings and workshops and also was screening films in outdated cinemas.

=== 1990s to 2010 ===
After the military coup of 1989, Sudan's Islamist government suppressed cinema, as well as much of public cultural life. As a consequence, the Sudanese Cinema Company was dissolved and the country's cinema screens showcasing Hollywood, Bollywood and Arabic movies were all eventually shut down, and later put up for sale. The old Coliseum Cinema, for example, became part of Khartoum's riot police headquarters. Movies from the 1960s, '70s, and '80s became extremely rare to be seen, and those in the National Archives were locked away and neglected. Up to the 2020s, there was no film archive accessible to the public, and even still images from these periods are scattered all over the country. These economic and political restrictions, along with the rise of satellite TV and the Internet, led people to rather watch films in their homes and deprived Sudanese artists of public recognition, funding for the production or distribution of films, and, most of all, freedom of artistic expression.

In their 2017 documentary Sudan's forgotten films, Suhaib Gasmelbari and Katharina von Schroeder created a portrait of the last two remaining Sudanese film experts, Awad Eldaw and Benjamin Chowkwan, who had been trying for 40 years to take care of the National Film Archives. The archive holds about 13.000 films, and was critically endangered by neglect from the government, extreme weather conditions and a general disregard for historical films from the country's early decades since independence.

Enjoying wider margins of expression, some filmmakers of Sudanese origin and living abroad made independent films about their country, like British-Sudanese filmmaker Taghreed Elsanhouri. Her documentaries Our Beloved Sudan, All about Darfur, Orphanage of Mygoma and Mother Unknown explore both the complex society in Sudan as well as the film director's views as a member of the important Sudanese diaspora community.

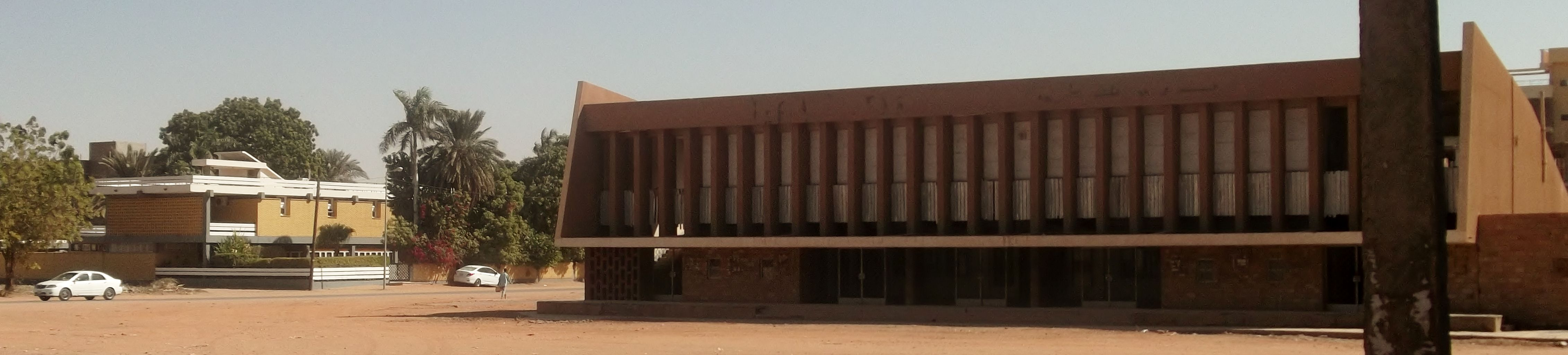
Alsafia Cinema in Khartoum North, 2013

== Revival of cinema and movie production since the 2010s ==
=== Fresh start with digital productions ===
Aided by the introduction of digital film equipment, workshops for a new generation of filmmakers, independent funding and recognition at international festivals, the 2010s saw several successful initiatives to re-establish film activities in Sudan. In 2013, the Sudan Film Factory was founded as an independent association for networking and promoting cinema in and outside of the country, and in 2014, the Sudan Independent Film Festival started its annual editions of growing popularity.

As there is no specialised institution for training or public funding for producing or presenting films in Sudan, filmmakers have been focussing on commercial, corporate, music or wedding videos, or by distributing their films online. Some are employed as freelancers for international media producers. For short or long documentary or feature films, they rely exclusively on private or foreign funding and cooperation. The Sudan Film Factory helped filmmakers access grants and loans. Other private entities offering grants and training to filmmakers in Sudan include institutions such as the local branches of the Goethe Institute and the British Council, the Doha Film Institute, Filmmakers Without Borders (FWB), the Deutsche Welle Akademie Film Development Fund, and the Arab Fund for Arts and Culture (AFAC). Also, the 'Swiss Initiative' has been conducting workshops and training for filmmakers. Their project is funded by UNESCO, as well as Swiss and international filmmakers.

In 2014, Sudanese filmmaker Hajooj Kuka, who was living both in Sudan and abroad at the time, made an internationally acclaimed documentary film about the ongoing attacks of the Sudanese army on the people in the Nuba mountains. Kuka's film Beats of the Antonov provides an artistic collage about war, music, and local identity on Sudan's southern frontiers and could not be shown in Sudan under the government of the time. In 2015, director Mohammed Kordofani was distinguished as best director with the Taharqa International Award for Arts for his short film Gone for Gold. His second short film, Nyerkuk (2016), received numerous distinctions, including the Network of Alternative Arab Screens (NAAS) Award at Carthage Film Festival, the Jury Award at Oran International Arabic Film Festival, and the Black Elephant Award at the Sudan Independent Film Festival.

=== Revival of public film shows before the civil war ===
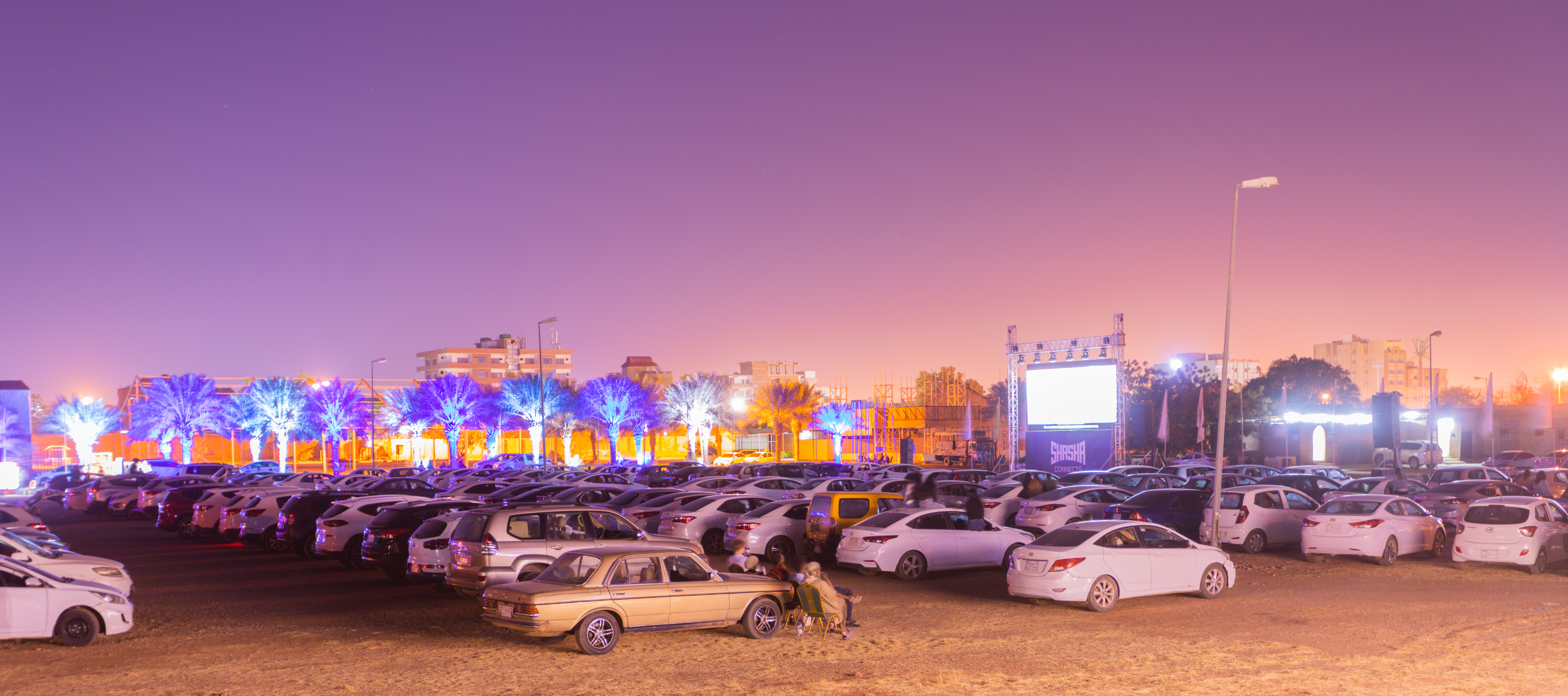
Drive-in cinema for the Sudanese-European film festival 2021

Starting in early 2021, and in the context of measures for social distancing during the COVID-19 pandemic, the British Council in Khartoum and local sponsors organised a film festival for both European and Sudanese movies at an outdoor, drive-in cinema space, thus presenting film shows in a new way. This format of the European-Sudanese Film Festival was repeated in June 2022, when new movies by upcoming Sudanese filmmakers were shown. In May 2022, Bono Cinema, the "first international cinema" in Sudan started showing current foreign movies in Khartoum with a capacity of more than 300 seats.

=== Contemporary filmmakers and movies ===
In 2015, parts of the film archive of Gadalla Gubara were digitised by a German-Sudanese film restoration project, allowing his documentaries about everyday life in Khartoum of the 1960s, as well as his feature film Tajouj to be shown to new generations in Khartoum as well as abroad.

The 40-minute feature film Iman: Faith at the crossroads, directed and written by filmmaker Mia Bittar, was produced in 2016 with the support of UNDP Sudan and presented the same year at the headquarters of the UN in New York. It tells four stories of young Sudanese, who have been attracted by terrorism, and is based on true events.

In 2019, the documentary Talking about Trees by Suhaib Gasmelbari, a story about four Sudanese filmmakers of the 1960s and the decline of cinema in Sudan, won awards at the Berlin International Film Festival and other international festivals.

The same year, the feature film You Will Die at Twenty by Amjad Abu Alala, a Sudanese filmmaker based in Dubai, won the Lion of the Future Award at the Venice Days, an independent film festival section held in association with the Venice Film Festival.

A female Sudanese filmmaker, who studied film direction in Egypt and Germany, is Marwa Zein. Her documentary Khartoum Offside tells the story of the first Sudanese women's soccer team in Khartoum. The film had its world premiere at the Berlin International Film Festival in 2019 and won awards at other international film festivals.

In the early 2010s, Issraa El-Kogali, a Swedish-Sudanese screenwriter, film director and producer based in Stockholm, started to become known for her multimedia installations and films, mainly focusing on her native Sudan. In 2010, she made her first documentary film In Search of Hip Hop about the Sudanese hip hop culture. In 2020, she produced and wrote the award-winning short fiction film A Handful of Dates, based on the short story of the same name by Sudanese writer Tayeb Salih. In Mohamed Kordofani's Goodbye Julia of 2023, El-Kogali collaborated as co-producer.

Suzannah Mirghani, who has been making short films since 2011, became internationally known through her sixth short film Al-Sit. The film won 23 international awards, including three Academy Award qualifying prizes in 2021. At the 2021 Luxor African Film Festival, Sudanese actor Al-Tayeb Al-Hadi Al-Tayeb was awarded a "Special Mention" for his role in the short film Listen To My Dance, directed by Alyaa Sirelkhatim.

Also in 2021, the documentary film The Art of Sin, written and directed in Norway and Sudan by Ibrahim Mursal, who grew up in Sudan, explored the trepidation felt by the Sudanese LGBT community through the experience of his protagonist Ahmed Umar. The movie premiered at the Bergen International Film Festival in 2020 and had its UK premiere in August 2022, but has not yet been shown in Sudan.

In November 2022, Sara Suliman's documentary Heroic Bodies had its first public performance at the International Documentary Film Festival Amsterdam (IDFA). Based on the filmmaker's dissertation at the School of Oriental and African Studies (SOAS) at the University of London and spanning Sudanese social history from colonial times to the late 20th century, the film investigates "how the human body was used as a means of resistance against the state, patriarchy and colonial oppression."

In April 2023, Goodbye Julia, by Sudanese filmmaker Mohamed Kordofani, became the first Sudanese film to win the Prix de la Liberté (Freedom Prize) in the Certain Regard section of the 2023 Cannes Film Festival. It was also the first feature film produced by Station Films, a Sudanese production company founded by Amjad Abu Alala and Mohamed Alomda.

In 2024 and 2025, two documentaries about the 2019 revolution and the Sudanese civil war that started in April 2023 were released. Sudan, remember us by French-Tunisian filmmaker Hind Meddeb premiered at the 81st Venice International Film Festival on 30 August 2024. It depicts the 2019 overthrow of Sudanese leader Omar Al-Bashir and the subsequent civil war that followed.

The 2025 documentary film Khartoum was directed by four young Sudanese filmmakers, Anas Saeed, Rawia Alhag, Ibrahim Snoopy, Timeea M. Ahmed, and British creative director and writer Phil Cox. It documents survival and quest for freedom through dreams, rebellion, and civil strife of five Khartoum residents. Premiered in January at the 2025 Sundance Film Festival, it was also presented at the 75th Berlin International Film Festival. In Geneva, it was awarded the International Film Festival and Forum on Human Rights (FIFDH) Gilda Vieira de Mello Prize.

The short film Nothing Happens after your Absence by Ibrahim Omar won the Jury Prize at the International Short Film Festival Oberhausen in 2026 and the Golden Tanit at Carthage Film Festival. During the 2026 Cannes Film Festival, it was shown at the Quinzaine des Cinéastes.

== See also ==
- Arab cinema
- Visual arts of Sudan
- Hussein Shariffe
- Gadalla Gubara
- List of Sudanese submissions for the Academy Award for Best International Feature Film
- List of Sudanese actors

== Sources ==
This article incorporates text from a free content work. Licensed under C-BY-SA 3.0 IGO. Text taken from The African film industry. Trends, challenges and opportunities for growth, UNESCO.
