= Sara Gadalla Gubara =

Sudanese swimmer and film director (born 1956)

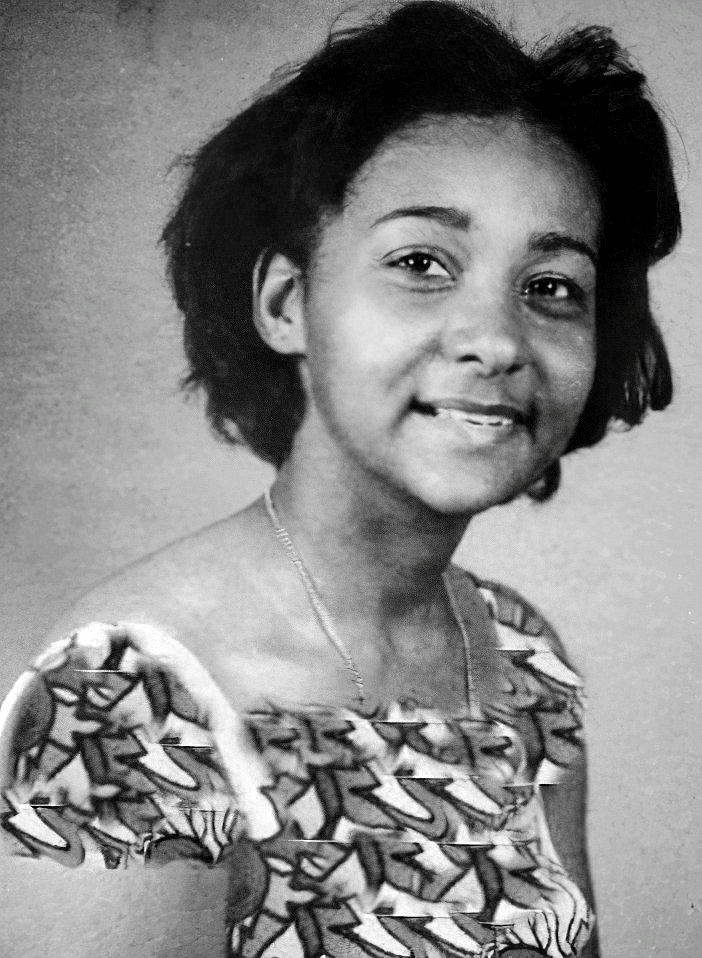
- Sara Gadalla Gubara in 1972

Personal information
- Native name: سارة جاد الله جبارة
- Born: 23 April 1956 (age 69) Helat Hamd, Khartoum Bahri, Sudan
- Education: Cairo Higher Institute of Cinema
- Parent: Gadalla Gubara (father)

Sport
- Country: Sudan
- Sport: Marathon swimming Long-distance swimming
- Club: Al-Hilal Swimming Club; Al-Kawkab Sports Club
- Coached by: Bayoumi Mohammed Salem

Sara Gadallah Gubara al-Faki Ibrahim (Arabic: سارة جاد الله جبارة, romanized: Sāra Jādallah Jubāra; born 23 April 1956) is a Sudanese competition swimmer and film director. She was the first Sudanese woman to participate in international swimming competitions, such as the Capri International long-distance swimming race in Italy, and the first Sudanese woman to swim the English Channel to France, despite having contracted polio in childhood. Further to her lifelong activity as a sportswoman, she became noted as a pioneering female filmmaker in her country, first assisting her father, Gadalla Gubara, and later directing her own films.

== Early life and education ==
Sara Gadalla was born in Helat Hamd, Khartoum Bahri, on 23 April 1956. Her father, Gadalla Gubara, was a pioneering Sudanese cameraman, film producer, director and photographer. Aged two, she contracted polio, which resulted in her left leg being impaired. By their doctor's instruction, her father then introduced her to swimming to help alleviate her lifelong disability and strengthen her personality.

She attended primary school at Helat Hamd School for Girls and then the Amirya Intermediate School for Girls in Khartoum Bahri. She attended Abu Bakr Sorour School for Girls in Omdurman, followed by Shendi Secondary School for Girls.

== Swimming career ==
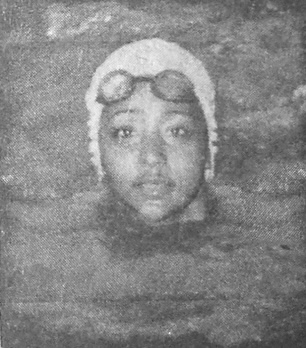
Gubara, c. 1972

By the time she was six years old, Sara had become a proficient swimmer and participated in several short-distance events. Her father was strongly involved in supervising and encouraging her burgeoning sports career. She joined Al-Kawkab sports club in Khartoum Bahri to practice swimming and was trained by Bayoumi Mohammed Salem, who helped develop her skills. She trained in the Nile river and the House of Culture's swimming pool, located next to the Republican Palace in Khartoum. Further, she participated in the Republic's short-distance championships and, in 1968, represented Sudan in the under-16 junior swimming team in Nairobi and won third place.

=== National competitions ===
In 1972, Sara joined the swimming team at Al-Hilal Club, Omdurman, and began participating in long-distance competitions. She participated in many of these races, where male and female swimmers competed simultaneously. The prize was calculated for the first, second and third winners, regardless of gender.

Further, her competitions included the Jabal Awliya race (50 kilometres (31 mi)), one of the longest races, which started from Jabal Awliya dam on the Blue Nile and ended at the TV Building in Omdurman. There, she came third after male swimmers Abd al-Majid Sultan Kigab and Salim. In the Atbara race (30 kilometres (19 mi)), she came fourth overall as the first woman swimmer, and from Wad Madani to Um-Sunat (30 kilometres (19 mi)), she came second to Kigab. In the race from Wad Nemari to Dongola (30 kilometres (19 mi)), held during the Independence holidays, she came in second place. Sara also stood out in the most difficult style of swimming, the butterfly stroke, which needs flexibility and high physical strength, where she also excelled and achieved records. Records recorded in her name were the 50-meter butterfly stroke, 100-meter freestyle swimming, and the 100- and 200-meter backstroke.

=== International competitions ===
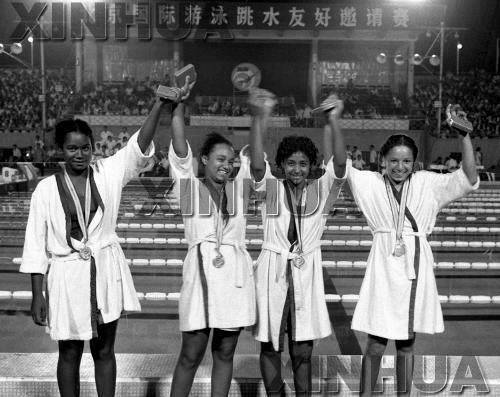
Sara Gubara in Beijing in 1975, second from the right

Internationally, Sara represented Sudan in various competitions in Kenya, the UK and China, where she won a gold medal, becoming one of Sudan's first participants in international swimming competitions. However, she considered the 1974 Maratona del Golfo Capri-Napoli race (36 kilometres (22 mi)) in Italy her most important foreign participation ever, where she won second place at the amateurs' level, and 23 (out of 25) in the professional category. In 1975, she represented Sudan in the Beijing games and won the gold medal in the short-distance category. She participated in the Capri–Naples saltwater race again in 1977 but came last in the professional category.

=== Retirement from sports ===
Sara retired with over 35 national and international medals and was the first Sudanese woman to swim the English Channel to France. For her pioneering role in Sudanese swimming, the International Olympic Committee in 2008 gave her a certificate of appreciation, and she was also honoured nationally and internationally.

In addition, Sara is an internationally accredited water aerobics instructor, lifeguard and sports administrator. Since 2003, she has served as the Sudanese Swimming Federation's general secretary. Further, she is a member of the Local Women's Committee and the Sudanese General Handicap Federation.

== Career as filmmaker ==
Following in her father's footsteps as a filmmaker, Sara Gadalla first joined the College of Fine and Applied Art (Khartoum), but did not complete her studies there. Instead, she went to study cinema at the Cairo Higher Institute of Cinema in Egypt and graduated in 1984 from the Animation Department as one of the first Sudanese women. Sara is considered one of the first and rare Sudanese female film directors and has contributed significantly to the history of cinema in Sudan.

=== Working with her father ===
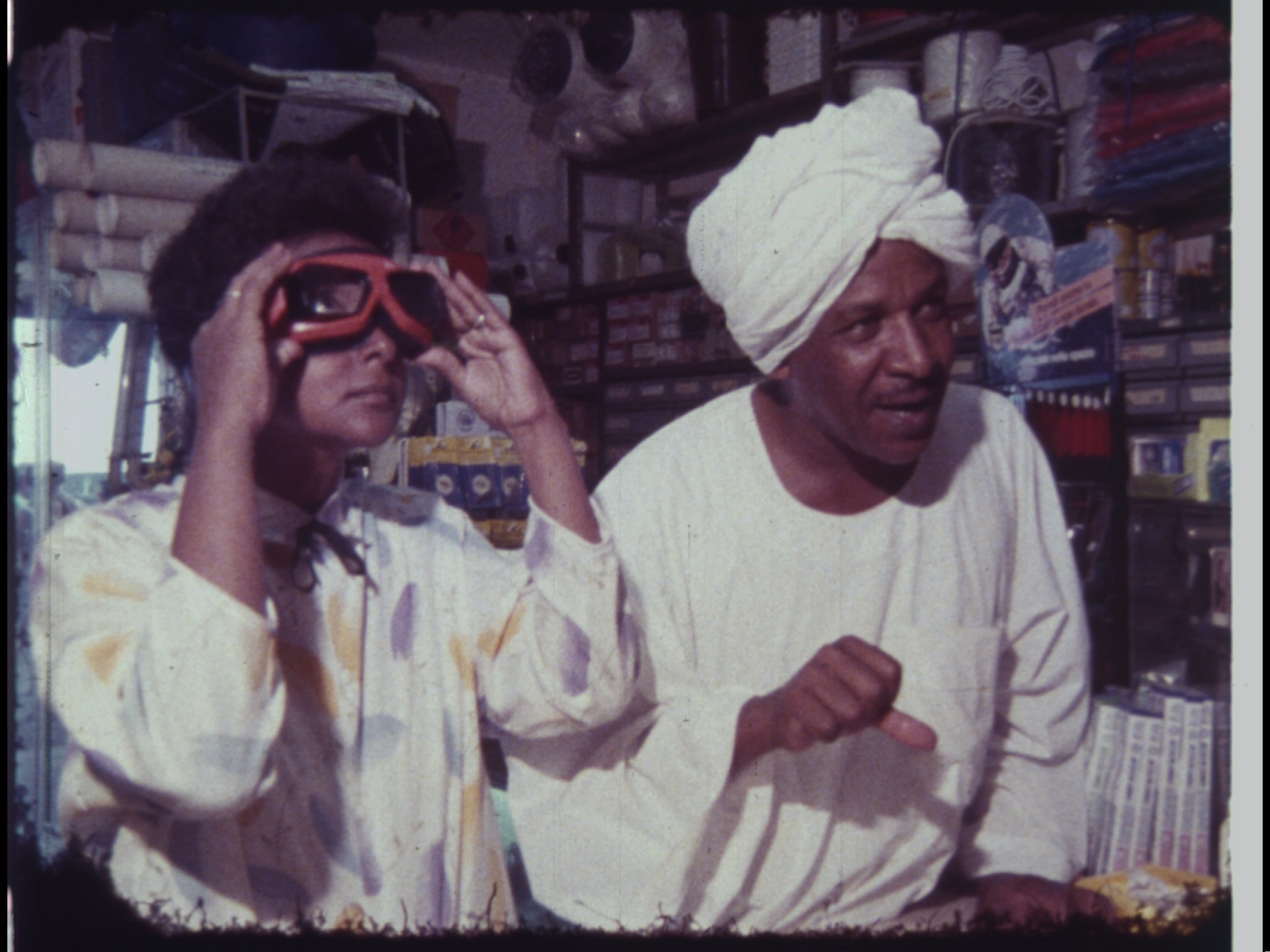
Sara and Gadalla Gubara in their documentary 'Viva Sara' (1984)

In 1984, Gadalla Gubara made a semi-documentary short film called Viva Sara, which tells the story of Sara, who, despite her physical disability, became one of Sudan's finest athletes. The film's title, Viva Sara, came from the spectators' supporting chants when Sara participated in the 1974 Capri-Naples race. The event also inspired the 1994 film, Sarahsarà by Italian director Renzo Martinelli.

After her father had lost his eyesight at the age of 80, Sara assisted him with his later film projects, including an adaptation of the French novel Les Misérables (2006) and his autobiography My life and the cinema. Her 2004 documentary The Lover of Light is a metaphor for Gadalla Gubara's eyesight debacle and his desire to use film to raise awareness of social concerns. She participated with this and two other films in the 2008 Kampala Film Festival.

Following the demolition of her father's Studio Gad by the Sudanese government in 2008 after an eight-year legal battle over land ownership, Sara worked to preserve her father's cinematic legacy, who had documented the history of Sudan, by seeking to digitise and archive his films. Between 2014 and 2016, a large part of her father's films was digitised by the Arsenal Institute for Film and Video Art in Berlin, Germany, and they have been shown again to audiences in Sudan as well as abroad.

=== Other productions ===
In 1985, Sara Gadalla worked for Sudan TV after graduating from the Higher Institute of Cinema and was in charge of the animation department. She completed about three or four animated films in the traditional way of drawing by hand. In 1989, she moved to the Kingdom of Saudi Arabia after she married a medical doctor, where she directed commercials and documentary films. After twelve years, she returned to Sudan and established her studio Belissar Art Production, where she worked as a camerawoman, director, and editor. She further completed an animated version of Fatima Al-Samha, a well-known Sudanese fairy tale that was later the subject of another animated film by Mai Elgizouli, a Sudanese filmmaker of the next generation.

After that, Sara Gadalla stopped producing animated films due to their high financial cost and moved on to documentary films. She participated in several festivals in Nigeria, South Africa, and Zanzibar. In particular, Sara Gadalla made several documentaries and short films about the situation of women in Sudan and the harmful societal customs practised against them, including female genital mutilation, to which she dedicated eight films. These films are meant to educate Sudanese people, especially those living in remote areas, about the dangers of this harmful practice. Similarly, she was also working on a film about Sudanese women in all political, artistic and sports fields, with a focus on pioneering personalities. Similar to earlier films by her father about the same topic, Song of Khartoum, she made several films about Sudanese cities, such as one about Khartoum.

== Personal life ==
In 1989, Sara married Bella Abu Sineina, and they have four children Ashraf, Sami, Khalid and Samhar.
