= Talal Afifi =

Sudanese film curator and producer (born 1976)

- Born: 1976 (age 49–50); Hamburg, Germany
- Citizenship: Sudan
- Occupation: Film curator and producer
- Years active: 2009 – present
- Known for: CEO of Sudan Film Factory, President of Sudan Independent Film Festival

Talal Afifi (Arabic: طلال عفيفي; born 1976, in Hamburg, Germany) is a Sudanese film curator and producer. In 2013, he and other filmmakers founded the Sudan Film Factory and the following year, the Sudan Independent Film Festival.

Afifi has been known for his role in promoting a new generation of Sudanese filmmakers since 2009. Since the start of the Sudanese Civil War in 2023, he has been continuing his participation at international film festivals and his support for emerging Sudanese filmmakers.

== Biography and career ==
Afifi became active in organizing workshops for future Sudanese filmmakers in 2009. At that time, there were no training and production facilities for filmmaking in Sudan, and most cinemas in the country had been neglected or closed down during the 30 years under the Islamist and military government of Omar al-Bashir.

As part of the activities of the German cultural centre - Goethe-Institut - in Sudan, Afifi acted as coordinator of the institute's newly established film production and training project from 2009 to 2012. Having worked before as a cultural manager in Egypt and Sudan, he was managing workshops and the production of a number of short films by emerging Sudanese filmmakers.

As director of the Sudan Film Factory (SFF), Afifi has represented current trends and productions of cinema in Sudan in numerous international forums. Apart from his activities for the promotion of cinema of Sudan, Afifi is also member of the executive committee of the Sudanese Writers Union.

== Sudan Film Factory ==
As there has been no specialised film school for training and no public funding for producing and presenting movies in Sudan, Afifi and other filmmakers founded the Sudan Film Factory in 2013 as an independent platform "to build the capacities of young Sudanese talents, produce films and expose Sudanese audiences to film making and cinema." Aided by the introduction of digital film equipment, numerous workshops, independent funding and growing recognition at international festivals, the 2010s saw several successful initiatives to re-establish film activities in Sudan. In 2014, Afifi and other filmmakers started the Sudan Independent Film Festival with annual editions of growing popularity.

In less than 10 years since its beginnings, SFF trained more than 300 young men and women in various aspects of filmmaking. In particular, it has organized some 30 screenwriting, directing and editing workshops, and produced more than 60 short films, several of them recognized in international festivals. Further, SFF helped Sudanese filmmakers find opportunities for grants and training, offered by the British Council and other cultural organizations, such as the Arab Fund for Arts and Culture (AFAC). In 2016, they hosted a workshop by the African Regional Intellectual Property Organization (ARIPO) that stressed the necessity for establishing copyright laws in Sudan. SFF is a member of the Network of Arab Alternative Screens and the Arab Network for Human Rights Films.

Among other productions, the SFF collaborated in the 2018 short film A Handful of Dates, based on a story by Sudanese writer Tayeb Salih. Leading up to its release in 2019, SFF participated in producing the award-winning feature film You Will Die at Twenty by Amjad Abu Alala, where Afifi appeared in the role of Alnoor. According to the 2021 study The African film industry, published by UNESCO, Sudan Film Factory under Afifi's leadership had become "one of Sudan’s most established production entities."

== Activities after 2023 ==
Following the Sudanese Civil War that started in 2023, Afifi has continued to promote and produce films from and about Sudan. He has been producing several documentary films in collaboration with production teams from the UK, Germany, and Egypt. Films co-produced by Afifi include Al-Sit, The Art of Sin, From Sudan to Argentina, A Handful of Dates and the 2025 award-winning documentary film Khartoum.

During the 2025 Safar Film Festival in London, he presented a programme titled Voices and Visions of Sudan, showcasing Sudanese films produced during the 1970s and 1980s, as well as contemporary productions reflecting the aftermath of the 2019 revolution. This programme was also presented in other cities of the United Kingdom from October to December 2025. Further, Afifi has continued to participate in international festival juries and curation roles, including the International Documentary Association Award (IDA), the Arab Fund for Arts and Culture (AFAC) and the Sharjah Film Platform Feature Fund.

== See also ==
- Cinema of Sudan
- Sudan Independent Film Festival
