= Mohamed Kordofani =

Sudanese filmmaker and screenwriter

- Born: Khartoum, Sudan
- Occupation: Film director and screenwriter
- Years active: 2014-present
- Known for: films about 21st-century Sudan
- Works: Goodbye Julia, 2023 feature film

Mohamed Kordofani (Arabic: محمد كردفاني, born in Khartoum) is a Sudanese film director and screenwriter. He became internationally known for his first feature film Goodbye Julia in 2023. It was the first film from Sudan ever to be presented at the Cannes Film Festival where it won the Prix de la Liberté (Freedom Award) in 2023. The film was selected by the Sudanese National Committee operating in exile to compete for the Best International Feature Film at the 96th Academy Awards.

== Life and career ==
Kordofani's initial career was as an aviation engineer in Bahrain, before turning to making videos and short films as a part-time activity. A largely self-taught filmmaker, Kordofani started his own company Kordofani Films in 2014, producing music videos, promotional films and event coverage to financially sustain his activities as a filmmaker. In an interview about his films, Kordofani said: “I make films for regular viewers. I use some dramatic components such as crime and suspense."

Kordofani was distinguished as best director with the Taharqa International Award for Arts for his 2015 short film Gone for Gold. His second short film, Nyerkuk (2016), received several distinctions, including the Network of Alternative Arab Screens (NAAS) Award at the Carthage Film Festival, the Jury Award at the Oran International Arabic Film Festival, and the Black Elephant Award of the Sudan Independent Film Festival. His next short film, Kejer's Prison, was shot in a Khartoum prison. It presents a 13-minute monologue of a frantic soldier who "attempts to justify the military officers’ violent actions against peaceful protesters."

Goodbye Julia, his first feature film, tells a dramatic story before the 2011 separation of Sudan and South Sudan, with “racism, classicism and the many divisions between Sudanese people” as major social themes. These contrasts are depicted in the main characters and their families: Mona, a Sudanese Arab and Muslim housewife and former popular singer, belongs to Sudan’s upper-middle-class, while Julia, a Christian woman of southern Sudanese African origin, belongs to an underprivileged community and lives in a poor neighbourhood of the capital.

Having been awarded several production grants, Goodbye Julia was the first film from Sudan ever to be presented in the Un Certain Regard section of the Cannes Film Festival. The premiere screening before an audience of 1,000 spectators and the following post-premiere Questions & Answers with the cast and crew, including comments on the ongoing 2023 Sudan conflict, received standing ovations.

Commenting on the new generation of Sudanese filmmakers, such as the co-producers of Goodbye Julia, Amjad Abu Alala and Mohamed Alomda, as well as the history of cinema in Sudan, Kordofani said:

Today’s developments and topics tackled by the Sudanese up-and-coming filmmakers do not come out of the blue; they are a result of many facts accumulated over past decades. Going back half a century, we will find many important cinematic gems that contributed greatly to Sudanese cinema history.

— Mohamed Kordofani, Sudanese filmmaker

== Filmography ==
- Gone for Gold, 2015, short film, Taharqa International Award for Arts
- Nyerkuk, 2016, short film, awards at Carthage Film Festival, Oran International Arabic Film Festival and the Sudan Independent Film Festival
- Kejer’s Prison, 2019, short film
- Goodbye Julia, 2023, Prix de la Liberté (Freedom Award) at the 2023 Cannes Film Festival
