= Sudan Media Forum =

Sudanese independent media network

The Sudan Media Forum (SMF) is a partnership of independent media organisations and journalists in Sudan. The Forum is dedicated to fostering an independent media landscape, advancing press freedom, promoting ethical journalism and cultivating an informed citizenship. Since the outbreak of war in Sudan on April 15, 2023, attacks and violations targeting journalists have risen to an unprecedented level.

== Background ==
The Forum was established on February 18th 2024 and it officially commenced its activities in April of that year with the launch of the “Stand with Sudan” campaign and the Joint Newsroom. Governed by a seven member board of directors, the forum was registered in the Netherlands in December 2024 as a non-profit organization. The board of directors are:

- Kamal Al-Sadiq (President)
- Mohamed Nagi (Treasurer)
- El-Tayeb Saeed (Secretary)
- Faisal Moh. Saleh (Board member),
- Madiha Abdullah (Board member)
- Lamia Al-Jaili (Board member)
- Faisal Al-Baqir (Board member).

== Membership ==
Its broad membership allows the Forum to coordinate national and international media advocacy efforts. Currently, the media organisations that are in coalition with Sudan Media Forum are:

- Dabanga - Radio/TV/Online
- Sudanese Journalists Syndicate
- Sudan Tribune
- Al-Tayar newspaper
- Aljreeda Newspaper
- Sudan-Bukra Media Org
- Altaghyeer Newspaper
- Ayin Network
- Alrakoba.net
- Sudanile.com
- Journalists for Human Rights - JHR - Sudan
- Female Journalists Network - Sudan
- The Democrat Newspaper
- Hala Radio - 96FM
- Radio (PRO FM) 106.6
- Medameek newspaper
- Darfur 24
- Al-Ayam Center for Cultural Studies and Development
- Teeba Press
- Alalg Center for Press Service
- Sudanese Center for Research, Training and Development Services
- Article Center for Training and Media Production
- mashaweer-news.com
- Sudans Reporters
- Televzyon Platform

== Activities ==
One of its notable initiatives is the #StandWithSudan campaign which aims to raise global awareness on the plight of Sudanese people facing war, famine and human rights abuses. The campaign was timed to coincide with the first anniversary of the outbreak of the war in Sudan and the Forum demanded a cease-fire from all warring parties.
