= Song of Khartoum =

- Directed by: Gadalla Gubara
- Release date: 1955
- Running time: 18 minutes
- Country: Sudan
- Language: Sudanese Arabic

Song of Khartoum (Arabic: اغنية الخرطوم, romanized: ʿUghniyya al-Khurṭūm) is a 1955 Sudanese short documentary film in the city symphony genre, directed by Gadalla Gubara. It is considered the first color film in African cinema.

== Content ==
The film depicts scenes of daily life in Khartoum, set to romantic Arabic songs.

== Reception ==
Song of Khartoum was shown at the International Film Festival Rotterdam in 2010.

== See also ==
- Cinema of Sudan
