= Tajouje =

1977 Sudanese romantic film

Tajouje تاجوج
- Poster of the digitised version of the film screened, in 2017, at Goethe institute, Sudan
- Directed by: Gadalla Gubara
- Written by: Gadalla Gubara
- Starring: Salah ibn Albadya
- Release date: 1 March 1977 (South Africa)
- Running time: 78 min
- Country: Sudan
- Language: Sudanese Arabic

Tajouje (Arabic: تاجوج, romanized: Tājūj; also Tajouj) is a 1977 Sudanese historical romance film directed by Gadalla Gubara, who considered it his best cinematographic work. It was the first feature film directed by a Sudanese filmmaker. It presents a dramatic story about the unhappy love of two suitors towards the heroine Tajouj. Set in rural Eastern Sudan, it featured the actor Salah ibn Albadya, who was also known for his songs of popular urban music in Sudan.

Among other awards, Tajouje won the Nefertiti Statute, Egypt's highest film award at the Cairo International Film Festival in 1982, and prizes at film festivals in Alexandria, Ouagadougou, Tehran, Addis Ababa, Berlin, Moscow, Cannes and Carthage. In 2015, the original copy was digitally restored by a German-Sudanese film project and shown both in Sudan and abroad.

== Plot ==
The film's story takes place in the distant past in the eastern part of Sudan in an isolated village. Mohallak, a young tribal man, is deeply in love with his cousin Tajouje and openly confesses his love for her in a song. As this is considered shameful in his tribe, Tajouje's father refuses his marriage proposal. Some time later, Mohallak repents his mistake and the marriage is finally agreed upon. In the meantime, however, Ohag, another suitor, has shown his interest in Tajouje, which arouses Mohallak's jealousy. This develops into several dramatic complications that eventually result in tragedy: Mohallak has to leave his village as "a wandering bard of the deserts."

== Literary inspiration ==
The film Tajouje is based on the eponymous 1948 romantic novel by Osman Mohamed Hashim, considered by literary critics as the first Sudanese novel. The story was later adapted for a theatre play by Khaled Abu Al-Rous and produced in the National Theatre in Omdurman.

== Critical reception ==
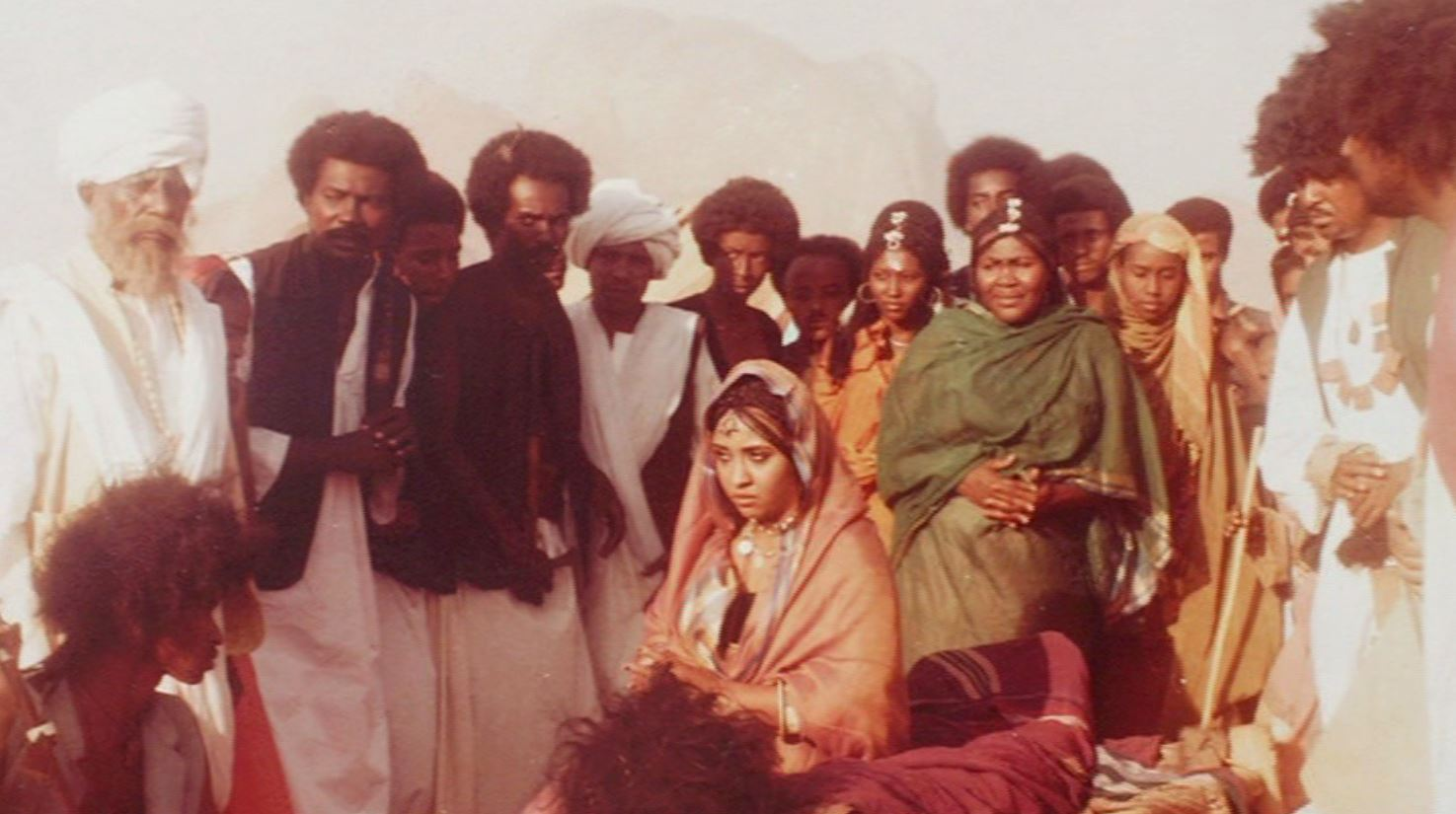
Film crew of Tajouje by Gadalla Gubara

Tajouje won the Nefertiti Statute, Egypt's highest film award at the Cairo International Film Festival in 1982, and prizes at film festivals in Alexandria, Ouagadougou, Tehran, Addis Ababa, Berlin, Moscow, Cannes and Carthage.

In 2015, parts of Gubara's film archive were digitised by a German-Sudanese film restoration project. Thus, the German cultural centre - Goethe-Institut - in Khartoum presented Tajouje in a digitally restored version in May 2017. Further, his documentaries about everyday life in Khartoum of the 1960s were shown to new generations of film audiences in Khartoum as well as abroad.

In 2019, the international movie portal Cinema Escapist considered Tajouje as one of the best films in African cinema. As of November 2022, Tajouje was rated 6.9 at IMDb from 27 reviews.

== See also ==
- Cinema of Sudan
- Photography in Sudan
