= Salah ibn Al Badiya =

Sudanese singer and actor (1937–2019)

Salah ibn Al Badiya صلاح بن البادية
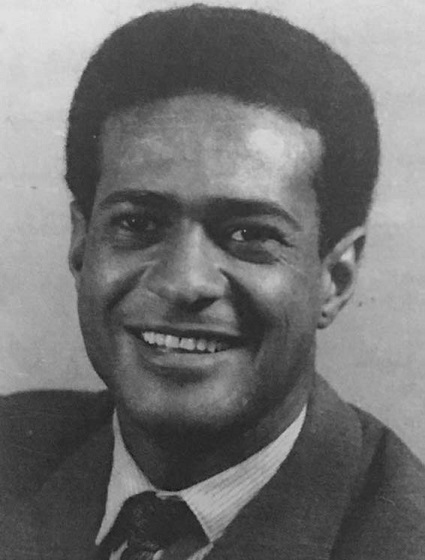

Background information
- Born: Salah el-Jayli Mohamed Abu-Qroon صلاح الجيلي مُحمَّد أبو قرون; 1937; Umm Dawm, Khartoum, Anglo-Egyptian Sudan
- Origin: Sudan
- Died: 16 September 2019 (aged 82) Amman, Jordan
- Occupations: Singer; composer; actor
- Instrument: Oud

Salah el-Jayli Mohamed Abu-Qroon (Arabic: صلاح الجيلي محمد أبوقرون; 1937–2019), known professionally as Salah ibn Al Badiya^{α}, was a Sudanese singer, composer and actor.

== Early life ==
ibn Al Badiya was born in 1937 in Umm Dawm, Khartoum, Anglo-Egyptian Sudan (present-day, Sudan) to a conservative family. Growing up between Umm Dawm and Abu Qaroun, ibn Al Badiya first studied at Al-Khalwa before attending secular education.

== Artistic career ==
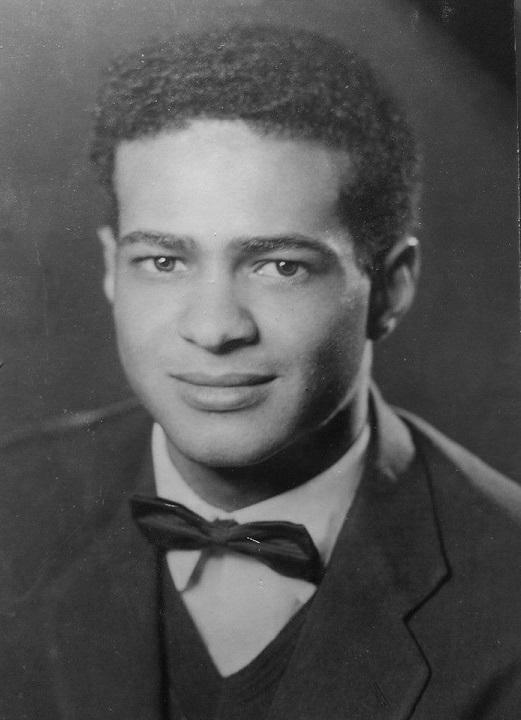
Ibn Al Badiya in the 1960s

ibn Al Badiya was introduced to music through Madih nabawi, until he stumbled on Umm Kulthum, who – with her voice – opened his eyes to a different kind of music. ibn Al Badiya started his career when he was still a teenager but did not make a public appearance until 1959 due to his conservative family's reaction. He was encouraged by journalists Mahjoub Osman and Mahjoub Mohamed Salah. However, his father recognised his voice on the radio and forced him (or he chose) to change his name so as not to bring shame to the family name, el-Jayli, a well-known Sofi leader. He was known as Al Badiya because of his relationship with the Baadiyah, or the desert.

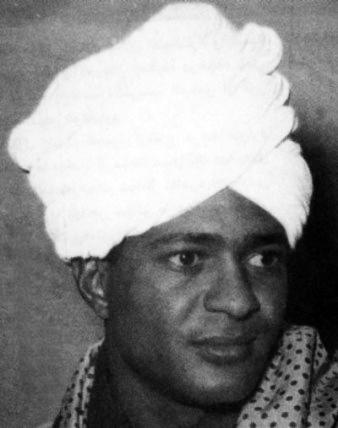
Al Madih Ibn Al Badiya in 1968

ibn Al Badiya teamed up with poet Mohamed Yousif Mousa and Abu Amna Hamid to produce some of his best songs. ibn Albdaya's discography includes 117 songs in 5 albums, 4 EPs, movies and plays. His career spanned over six decades, and he introduced other prolific artists such as Mahmoud Abdulaziz. Due to his conservative upbringing, ibn Al Badiya's discography also includes Madih nabawi.

His audience extended beyond Sudan, reaching Ethiopia, Chad, Nigeria, Qatar, Kuwait, etc. According to Riek Machar, SPLA had plans to attack a steamer on the White Nile, but when they found out that Salah was on board, they abandoned the idea out of love for the artist.

Anwar Hashim, Somiah Alalfe, and Salah ibn Albdaya in the movie Eyes Journey[Ar] (1983).

ibn Al Badiya started acting at the theatre with actress Nemat Hmad in Greeba Mosodna and for the crown before starting in Tajouje (a historical romantic tragedy). ibn Al Badiya then moved to the cinema, with his first role being in the movie adaption of Tajouje in 1977, Toar Aljar in Germany, and followed by Eyes Journey (1983).

== Death ==
ibn Al Badiya died aged 82 on 16 September 2019 in Amman, Jordan, from a heart attack. He was there to rest and meet his brother after his final performance during the "Joy of Sudan" concert on the 18th of August, where he sang Oh! My country (Arabic: يا بلدي) before the signing to the formation of the civil and military council in Sudan. Thousands, including political leaders, attended his funeral at Umm Dawm.

== Notes ==
^α Also romanized as Salah ibn Albadya or Salah ibn el-Badya

== See also ==
- Music of Sudan
- Mostafa Sid Ahmed
- List of Sudanese singers
