= Suhaib Gasmelbari =

Sudanese director and cinematographer

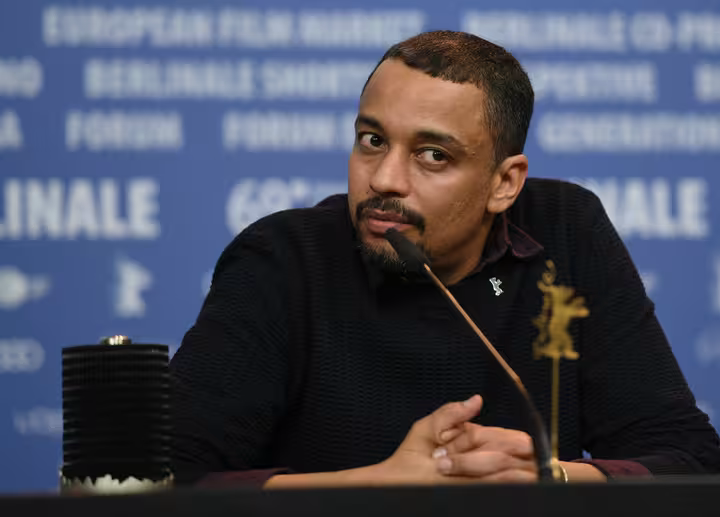
- Filmmaker Suhaib Gasmelbari during a press conference on the sidelines of the 69th edition of the Berlinale, on February 16, 2019, in Berlin, Germany.
- Born: 1979 (age 46–47); Omdurman
- Education: University of Paris 8 Vincennes-Saint-Denis
- Occupations: Film director, cinematographer, screenwriter
- Years active: 2012-present
- Notable work: Talking About Trees (2019)

Suhaib Gasmelbari (born 17 December 1979, Omdurman, Sudan) is a Sudanese film director, screenwriter, and cinematographer.

== Biography ==
Gasmelbari was born in Omdurman, Sudan in December 1979. He lived parts of his early childhood in Russia before returning to Sudan. At the age of 16, Gasmelbari went into exile in the United Arab Emirates to avoid the forced military conscription implemented by the government of Sudan in the midst of the Second Sudanese Civil War. In the Emirates, he finished high school. He later briefly attended a university in Alexandria, Egypt, before moving to Tours, France in 2002 with the intention of learning French language and studying literature and philosophy. Gasmelbari later studied cinema at the University of Paris 8 Vincennes-Saint-Denis. After graduation, he found work as a freelance cameraman and editor, working with journalists on reports for Al Qarra, Al Jazeera and France 24 TV stations.

For his master's degree, Gasmelbari attempted to direct a fictional film, but had difficulty getting official permits and dropped the project. Next, he directed short films and researched the Sudanese film archives, discovering old Sudanese films. Gasmelbari released the film Sudan's Forgotten Films in 2017, which was named the "Arts and Culture Story of the Year" at the 2018 FPA Media Awards. He has taken part in projects saving and digitizing films such as those of Sudanese film directors active during the 1960s Ibrahim Shaddad, Suleiman Mohamed Ibrahim and Eltayeb Mahdi.

In 2019, Gasmelbari directed his first feature-length film, a documentary called Talking About Trees, which was produced by Marie Balducchi. He had to film it entirely in secret, due to state suppression. The film depicts the efforts of veteran Sudanese filmmakers Ibrahim, Suleiman, Manar and Altayeb, founders of the Sudanese Film Group, to revive cinema in their country. It received the Glasshütte Original Documentary Award at the Berlin International Film Festival 2019 and also won the Audience Award at the same festival. The film went on to win the FIPRESCI Prize at the International Istanbul Film Festival., Tanit d'or at Carthage Film Festival, Golden Star at El Gouna Film Festival, The Documentary Award at Palm Springs International Film Festival, Grand Jury Prize at Mumbai Film Festival. In Sep 2019, Gasmelbari was distinguished with the MENA Award by Variety Magazine, an award given to the best cinematic talent in the Middle East and North Africa.

In an article for the British Film Institute, Gasmelbari commented on the four filmmakers and his documentary:

I wanted the rich past of the characters to be revealed through its remnants in the present and through their own films. As the film speaks about cinema in Sudan, it naturally criticises the political state of the country, where cinema halls were shut down. Some were destroyed or transformed into storage spaces and parking lots for banks. One became the office for the military’s radio station.

— Suhaib Gasmelbari

== Selected filmography ==
- 2012: Oda Nagam (Ode to my Feet)
- 2017: Sudan's forgotten films
- 2019: Talking about trees

== See also ==
- Cinema of Sudan
