= Cotton Queen (2025 film) =

2025 drama film

- Directed by: Suzannah Mirghani
- Written by: Suzannah Mirghani
- Produced by: Caroline Daube; Didar Domehri
- Starring: Mihad Murtada; Rabha Mohamed Mahmoud; Talaat Fareed; Haram Bisheer; Mohamed Musa; Hassan Kassala
- Cinematography: Frida Marzouk
- Edited by: Amparo Mejías; Simon Blasi; Frank Müller
- Music by: Amine Bouhafa
- Production companies: Strange Bird; Maneki Films; Philistine Films; Film Clinic
- Distributed by: Mad Solutions
- Release date: 3 September 2025 (Venice)
- Running time: 94 minutes
- Countries: Germany; France; Palestine; Egypt; Qatar; Saudi Arabia; Sudan
- Language: Arabic

Cotton Queen is a 2025 internationally co-produced drama film written and directed by Suzanna mirghani

i in her feature directorial debut. It stars Mihad Murtada, Rabha Mohamed Mahmoud, Talaat Fareed, Haram Bisheer, Mohamed Musa and Hassan Kassala.

It had its world premiere at the 82nd Venice International Film Festival in the Critics Week section on 3 September 2025.

== Premise ==
Nafisa lives in a cotton farming village in Sudan, where she is raised on tales from her grandmother of battling British colonizers. When a businessman arrives, with a new development plan and genetically engineered cotton, she becomes the center of a power play.

== Cast ==
- Mihad Murtada as Nafisa
- Rabha Mohamed Mahmoud as Al-Sit
- Talaat Fareed as Babiker
- Haram Bisheer
- Mohamed Musa as Bilal
- Hassan Kassala as Nadir

== Production ==
Production was set to take place in Sudan, however, due to the Sudanese civil war, it was relocated to Egypt. Production took place over the course of 25 days.

== Release ==
It had its world premiere at the 82nd Venice International Film Festival in the Critics Week section on 3 September 2025. It also screened at the Chicago International Film Festival on 18 October 2025. and the Thessaloniki International Film Festival where it won the Golden Alexander for Best Feature Film. Mad Solutions will distribute the film in the Middle East.
