= Cinema in Sudan: Conversations with Gadalla Gubara =

Cinema in Sudan: conversations with Gadalla Gubara
- Directed by: Frédérique Cifuentes
- Screenplay by: Frédérique Cifuentes
- Produced by: Sias Wilson; Frédérique Cifuentes
- Cinematography: Frédérique Cifuentes
- Edited by: Peter Lewis
- Music by: Tim Puckett; Waleed Waselny Norak; Sharhabil Ahmed
- Release date: 2008
- Running time: 52 minutes
- Country: France

Cinema in Sudan: conversations with Gadalla Gubara is a French 2008 documentary film.

== Synopsis ==
This documentary portrays a great Sudanese filmmaker, Gadalla Gubara (1920-2008), one of the pioneers of cinema in Africa. Through his works, Gadalla shows us a mysterious and misunderstood country, Sudan. Despite censorship and the lack of financial backing for over sixty years, he produced an independent and unique cinema in a country where freedom of expression is a rare luxury. This film follows the struggle of the man who received the Excellence Career Award at the 2006 African Academy Awards, Nigeria.
