= You Will Die at Twenty =

2019 Sudanese feature film

- Film poster
- Arabic: ستموت في العشرين
- Directed by: Amjad Abu Alala
- Written by: Amjad Abu Alala; Yousef Ibrahim
- Based on: "Sleeping at The Foot of The Mountain" by Hammour Ziada
- Produced by: Arnaud Dommerc; Michael Henrichs; Ingrid Lill Høgtun; Marie Fuglestein Lægreid; Linda Bolstad Strønen
- Starring: Islam Mubarak; Moatasem Rashed; Mahmoud Alsarraj; Bonna Khalid; Talal Afifi
- Cinematography: Sébastien Goepfert
- Edited by: Heba Othman
- Music by: Amin Bouhafa
- Production companies: Andolfi; Canal+ International; DUOfilm; Die Gesellschaft DGS; Film-Clinic; Station Films; Sunny Land Film; Transit Films
- Release date: 29 August 2019 (Venice)
- Running time: 103 minutes
- Countries: Sudan; France; Egypt; Germany; Norway; Qatar
- Language: Sudanese Arabic

You Will Die at Twenty (Arabic: ستموت في العشرين, romanized: satamūt fīl-ʿishrīn) is a 2019 Sudanese drama film directed by Amjad Abu Alala. Selected as the Sudanese entry for the Best International Feature Film at the 93rd Academy Awards, it was not nominated. It was the first film from Sudan ever to have been submitted for an Oscar competition.

== Plot ==
The film's fable-like story is based on a short story by Sudanese writer Hammour Ziada: A Sufi mystic of a Sudanese village in Gezira State near the river Nile predicts that Muzamil, a newborn boy, will die when he reaches the age of twenty. During his first years of adolescence, Muzamil grows up like other children, but sometimes feels uneasy about his future.

As a teenager, he gets to know Suleiman, an outsider in the community, who has returned after spending years abroad. Suleiman owns a film projector and starts to show Muzamil movies in his house, thus introducing the young man to an unknown world. Upon turning twenty, he is shown looking at a bus that could take him away.

== Cast ==
- Islam Mubarak as Sakina, Muzamil's mother
- Mustafa Shehata as Muzamil the teenager
- Moatasem Rashed as young Muzamil
- Mahmoud Alsarraj as Sulaiman
- Bonna Khalid as Naima
- Talal Afifi as Alnour, Muzamil's father

== Background ==
Since few films had been produced in Sudan since independence in 1956, You Will Die at Twenty was only the country's eighth feature film. Filmmaker Amjad Abu Alala, who was born in Dubai to Sudanese parents, shot the film in northern Sudan during the upheavals of the Sudanese revolution and despite challenges in a country without a film industry and under the Islamist government of the time.

== International reception ==
The film had its premiere at the 2019 Venice International Film Festival’s parallel section Venice Days and was awarded the Lion of the Future award for Best First Feature film. Subsequently, it also won the Golden Star at the El Gouna Film Festival in Egypt and other festivals.

Film Movement, a U.S. distributor of award-winning independent and foreign films, announced that it will distribute “You Will Die at Twenty” via virtual cinema in 2021, as well as on home entertainment and digital platforms.

In his review for Variety magazine, film critic Jay Weissberg called it "an affecting work and an impressive first feature thanks in great part to its splendid visual design."

In The Guardian, Cath Clarke awarded the film four out of five stars, saying it was "a parable about the dangers of blind faith in religion and authority, but it’s also warmly compassionate and accepting of human nature […] there are some gorgeous images here, too, such as flecks of dust glimmering in beams of sunlight or banks of the Nile, which give the movie a kind of mythic otherworldliness."

The film was launched in German cinemas on 25 August 2022, and received favourable reviews in specialized magazines and newspapers.

== See also ==
- Cinema of Sudan
- List of submissions to the 93rd Academy Awards for Best International Feature Film
- List of Sudanese submissions for the Academy Award for Best International Feature Film
