= Suzannah Mirghani =

Sudanese filmmaker, writer and producer

- Born: Suzannah Mirghani; Sudan
- Education: UCL Qatar
- Occupations: Scriptwriter, Researcher, Independent filmmaker, Producer, Editor
- Years active: 1989–present
- Spouse: Rodney X Sharkey
- Awards: Best Director

Suzannah Mirghani (also known as Suzi Mirgani), is a Qatar-based Sudanese-Russian scriptwriter, researcher, and independent filmmaker. She is best known for the award-winning 2021 short film Al-Sit. Currently, Mirghani is an Assistant Director for Publications at the Center for International and Regional Studies (CIRS) at Georgetown University in Qatar.

== Education and personal life ==
Mirghani graduated with degrees in media studies and museum studies from University College London Qatar (UCL Qatar). The daughter of a Russian mother and a Sudanese father, she is married to Rodney X Sharkey. Her sister Julietta Mirghani is also a film producer.

== Career ==
=== As filmmaker ===
In 2011, she played the leading role in the short film Re:Move directed by Eric Priezkalns. The same year, she made her directorial debut with the short Hamour. In 2014, she directed the short film Hind's Dream which received critical acclaim and won the award for "artistic vision and poetic screenwriting" at the 2014 Doha Film Institute Ajyal Film Festival. In 2015, the same film was included in the official selection for the short film corner at the 2015 Cannes Film Festival. After that success, she directed her next short Caravan in 2016.

In 2021, she directed the short film Al-Sit that became an important step in her cinema career. The film won 23 international awards, including three Academy Award qualifying prizes in 2021, where critics considered the film as one of the finest Sudanese films. After winning the Grand Prix award at the Tampere International Film Festival 2021 in Finland, Al-Sit was automatically qualified to enter the competition for short films at the Academy Awards (Oscars). Mirghani also won the International Short Films Competition Award for the Best Director at the Beirut International Women Film Festival, the Excellence in Women's Filmmaking award at the ECU European Independent Film Festival in France and the Excellence in Women's Filmmaking for a dramatic short at the European Independent Film Festival.^{[where?]}

In 2020, she was selected to be a jury member at the Sudan International Film Festival (SIFF). In 2021, she made a documentary called Virtual Voice, which premiered at the Tribeca Film Festival. In the meantime, she started her first feature film Cotton Queen, a story set in the cotton fields of Sudan. Both films were later selected at Doha Film Institute's Qumra 2021.

=== As writer ===
Apart from cinema, Mirghani is also the author and editor of several academic books as well as published short stories and poetry. She has authored the studies Target Markets: International Terrorism Meets Global Capitalism in the Mall and Consumer Citizenship: National Identity and Museum Merchandise in Qatar. She is the editor of the book Art and Cultural Production in the Gulf Cooperation Council. Further, she is the co-editor of articles such as "Media and Politics in the Wake of the Arab Uprisings" and "Food Security in the Middle East". In 2007, she contributed to the International Feminist Journal of Politics, and in 2009 to the collection of literature titled Journeys Home: An Anthology of Contemporary African Diasporic Experience.

== Filmography ==
Year	Film	Role	Genre	Ref.
2011	Re:Move	Suzi	Short film	
2011	Hamour	Director, Writer	Short film	
2014	Hind's Dream	Director, Writer, Editor, Producer, Cinematographer	Short film	
2016	Caravan	Director, Writer, Editor, Producer	Short film	
2017	There be Dragons	Director, Writer, Editor, Producer	Short film	
2020	Al-Sit	Director, Writer, Editor, Producer	Short film	
2021	Virtual Voice	Director, Writer, Editor, Producer, Cinematographer, Art director	Documentary short	
2021	And I Was Left Behind	Assistant Director	Documentary short	
2025	Cotton Queen	Director, Writer	Film	

== See also ==
- Cinema of Sudan
