= Khartoum Offside =

2019 Sudanese sports documentary film

- Film poster
- أوفسايد الخرطوم
- Directed by: Marwa Zein
- Screenplay by: Marwa Zein
- Produced by: Marwa Zein; Henrik Underbjerg
- Starring: Elham Balatone; Nedal Fadlallah; Fatma Gaddal; Sara Jubara; Halah Zakariya
- Cinematography: Marwa Zein
- Edited by: Mohammed Emad Rizq
- Music by: Tunde Jegede
- Release date: February 13, 2019
- Running time: 75 minutes
- Countries: Sudan; Norway; Denmark
- Language: Sudanese Arabic

Khartoum Offside (original title: أوفسايد الخرطوم Oufsaiyed Elkhortoum) is a 2019 Sudanese sports documentary film with a focus on young women in Sudan, produced, written and directed by Sudanese filmmaker Marwa Zein. It was globally premiered in the 2019 Berlinale Forum in Germany and is one of the three notable Sudanese films of 2019.

The film begins with the lines:

“Under the current political Islamic military rule, women are not allowed to play football in Sudan – and we are not allowed to make films – but…”

as a central message to the documentary.

== Production ==
It took Zein four years to make this documentary. Due to the generally negative attitude towards women's human rights in Sudan before the Sudanese revolution of 2018/19, Zein did not encounter physical assault, but received threats by Sudanese authorities to destroy the cameras. Nevertheless, the film was shot in Khartoum, Sudan, and produced by Marwa Zein for ORE Productions and Hendrik Underbjerg for Stray Dog Productions, Copenhagen, Denmark and Oslo, Norway.

== Storyline and background ==
With determination, a group of young women in Khartoum are out to play professional football, in defiance to an imposed ban by the Sudanese Islamist military government. Despite the National Football Association receiving FIFA funds earmarked for women’s teams, the team continues to be marginalized. However, the elections within the association signal a possible overhaul of the entire system. They struggle to get an official recognition as the Sudanese women's national football team, faced with strong opposition to their goals.

Captain Sara (Sara Jubara), a young Christian woman, born in northern Sudan, shows entrepreneurial thinking, and is searching for business models to make their dreams a reality, as she assembles a Sudanese team for the FIFA Women's World Cup. Apart from the need to find sponsorship, there are key societal challenges they have to face.

In his article 'Try being a woman playing soccer in Sudan', academic Steve Howard wrote about the film: "The footballers are a mixed group of Sudanese and South Sudanese women working for a living as building maintenance workers, high school students, shopkeepers, and the like. Members include women from the Nuba Mountains, a particularly oppressed region near the northern side of the new border. And their struggles include the South Sudanese team members’ efforts to stay in Sudan, where they now require a residency permit after the breakup of the two Sudans in 2011."

== Cast ==
- Elham Balatone as Elham
- Nedal Fadlallah as Henda
- Fatma Gaddal as Gaddal
- Sara Jubara as Captain Sara
- Halah Zakariya as Halah

== Release and critical reception ==
According to IMDb, the film was released on February 13, 2019. The following day, it was premiered at the Forum of the Berlin International Film Festival, and later presented at other festivals, like Visions du Réel in Switzerland, CPH: DOX Copenhagen, Sheffield Doc/Fest and IDFA Amsterdam. It was also shown at the Hot Docs Canadian International Documentary Festival on April 26, 2019. The film was screened online via Zoom alongside another feminist Afro-Arab film, The Bleaching Syndrome (2020), in Arabic with English subtitles, by Dardishi on October 24, 2020. In Khartoum, it was first shown at the opening of the Sudan Independent Film Festival in January 2020.

Immediately after its premiere in Berlin, film critic Vladan Petković called it a "lively, touching and, at times, poetic documentary" and Joseph Fahim wrote in his review on the Berlinale 2019: "Strong-willed, refreshingly liberated and ferociously independent, Zein’s footballers defy the mainstream perceptions of Sudanese women."

On the occasion of its screening at the New York African Film Festival in December 2020, an interview about the making of the documentary between Marwa Zein and Sudanese-American filmmaker Sarra Idriss was published on YouTube. In this interview, Zein explained the wider scope of her documentary: "I wanted to tackle many aspects about being Sudanese...Are we Arabs or not? Are we still classified based on the colour of our skin, the last name of our family? – Sexuality, the political situation, inequality of women and men, religion – all of this, I wanted to tell a story about."

== Accolades ==
Year	Event	Prize	Recipient	Result	Ref.
2020	ASA	2020 ASA Film Prize	Marwa Zein	Runner-up	
2019	AMAA	Best Documentary	Marwa Zein	Won	
2019	CFF	Best Documentary	Marwa Zein	Won	
2019	Berlinale	Best Documentary	Marwa Zein	Nominated	

== See also ==
- Cinema of Sudan
- Women's Football Association
