= Ali El Arabi =

Egyptian director

- Born: Dakahlia, Egypt
- Occupations: Director, Producer
- Awards: El Gouna Film Festival best documentary

== Early life ==
Ali El Arabi was born in Dakahlia, Egypt. He grew up practicing kickboxing and won Egypt's national kickboxing championship. He became passionate about filmmaking when he moved to Cairo in 2009.

== Career ==
Ali made his first foray into the filmmaking world when he met some staff members at ZDF channel who discovered his talent. Afterwards, he traveled to Germany to study filmmaking and production and began his career at ZDF channel where he made a number of documentaries on war zones in Syria, Lebanon, Iraq, Afghanistan and Kurdistan.

El Arabi founded his production company, Ambient Light. In 2013, he began making short documentaries and used his marketing skills to sell them to a number of prominent platforms, including National Geographic.

Ali El Arabi received an invitation from the Arab League to make documentaries on refugees and send them to entities responsible for making decisions on refugee matters. Thus, he traveled to several refugee camps, the birthplace of his first documentary feature film Captains of Za'atari.

=== Captains of Za'atari ===
Captains of Za'atari follows the story of Mahmoud and Fawzi, from adolescence stage to adulthood, who dream of becoming professional footballers. Al Arabi spent 8 years working on the film, which was commercially released in November in the US and in the Arab world Theaters. Furthermore, Captains of Za'atari was nominated for 15 awards and screened in 82 international film festivals, including Sundance Film Festival, where it had its world premiere, and was chosen as the second-best film in the lineup of the festival by Variety magazine. The film also had its Arab world premiere at the fifth edition of Gouna Film Festival, where it nabbed El Gouna Golden Star for Best Documentary Film, and screened at the Official Competition of Carthage Film Festival

=== Current projects ===
Currently El Arabi is working on several regional and international projects, including the feature film The Legend of Zeineb and Noah, which is directed by Yousry Nasrallah and co-produced by El Arabi.
