= Al-Sit =

2021 Sudanese short drama film

- Directed by: Suzannah Mirghani
- Written by: Suzannah Mirghani
- Produced by: Suzannah Mirghani; Eiman Mirghani
- Starring: Mihad Murtada; Rabeha Mohammed Mahmoud; Mohammed Magdi Hassan; Haram Basher; Alsir Majoub
- Cinematography: Khaled Awad
- Edited by: Abdelrahim Kattab; Suzannah Mirghani
- Production companies: Suzannah Mirghani Films; Doha Film Institute
- Distributed by: MAD Solutions
- Release date: 19 November 2020 (Ajyal Film Festival)
- Running time: 20 minutes
- Countries: Sudan; Qatar
- Language: Arabic

Al-Sit is a 2021 Sudanese drama short film directed by Suzannah Mirghani and co-produced by the director herself with Eiman Mirghani for Suzannah Mirghani Films. The film stars Mihad Murtada and Rabeha Mohammed Mahmoud with Mohammed Magdi Hassan, Haram Basher, and Alsir Majoub in supporting roles. The film is about Nafisa, a 15-year-old young woman, who is faced by an arranged marriage in a cotton-farming village in Sudan. The film qualified to enter the competition category for short films at the Academy Awards (Oscars), after winning the Grand Prix award at the Tampere International Film Festival 2021 in Finland. It has won 23 international awards, including three Academy Award qualifying prizes in 2021.

== Cast ==
- Mihad Murtada as Nafisa
- Rabeha Mohammed Mahmoud as Al-Sit
- Mohammed Magdi Hassan as Nadir
- Haram Basher as Nafisa's Mother
- Alsir Majoub as Bilal
- Murtada Eltayeb as Driver
- Talaat Farid as Babiker
- Fatma Farid as Faiza
- Intisar Osman as Faiza's Mother
- Abdalla Jacknoon as Babiker's Father

== Production and critical reception ==
The film was shot in and around Khartoum and Aezzazh village in Sudan. It had its international premiere at Clermont-Ferrand Short Film Festival in France on 2 February 2021, and then premiered on 9 April 2021 in the United States and home Premiere in the first-ever hybrid edition of the Doha Film Institute's (DFI) 8th Ajyal Film Festival.

Receiving her award for Best Short film of the SUDU Prize at the Quibdó Africa Film Festival in Pointe-Noire, Mirhani said: "We made this film with a 99 percent Sudanese cast and crew (and 1 percent Lebanese). In fact, filmmaking in Sudan is finally beginning to flourish after decades of prohibition and neglect."

== Awards and accolades ==
Mirghani won the International Short Films Competition Award for the Best Director at the Beirut International Women Film Festival. At the Busan International Film Festival, the film won a Jury Prize in International Competition. Mirghani later won the distinction of excellence in Women's Filmmaking award at the ECU European Independent Film Festival and in Women's Filmmaking for dramatic Short at The European Independent Film Festival. It also received the Special Mention at the Malmö Arab Film Festival. At the Zanzibar International Film Festival, the film won the Best Short/Animation Award and ZIFF Chairman's Award.

== See also ==
- Cinema of Sudan
