= Moustafa Gadalla =

Egyptian egyptologist

- Born: 1944 (age 81–82)
- Education: University of Cairo (graduated in 1967)
- Scientific career
- Fields: Egyptologist, engineer, topographer

Moustafa Gadalla (born 1944) is an Egyptologist from Cairo. He is the director of the Tehuti Research Foundation, a US-based non-profit organization dedicated to Ancient Egypt studies.

He graduated in civil engineering from the University of Cairo in 1967 and moved to the United States in 1971. He independently studied many history-related subjects, including Egyptology, mythology, religions, the Bible and ancient languages.

He is the author of several books about Ancient Egypt and he supports the idea that the Ancient Egyptian religion was not polytheistic, but instead worshiped a single god whose various attributes were known to Egyptians as neteru.

== Works ==
- Historical Deception (1996)
- Tut-Ankh-Amen (1997)
- Exiled Egyptians (1999)
- Egyptian Harmony (2000)
- Pyramid Handbook (2000)
- Egyptian Divinities: The All Who Are the One (2001)
- Egyptian Cosmology: The Animated Universe (2001)
- Egyptian Rhythm: The Heavenly Melodies (2002)
- Egyptian Mystics: Seekers of the Way (2003)
- Egyptian Romany: The Essence of Hispania (2004)
- Pyramid Illusions (2004)
- The Ancient Egyptian Roots of Christianity (2007)
- The Ancient Egyptian Culture Revealed (2007)
