= Kabul, City in the Wind =

2018 documentary

- Promotional release poster
- Directed by: Aboozar Amini
- Produced by: Jia Zhao
- Release date: 14 November 2018
- Running time: 88 minutes
- Countries: Netherlands; Germany; Japan; Afghanistan
- Language: Persian

Kabul, City in the Wind is a 2018 Persian-language documentary film directed by Aboozar Amini. In July 2019, it was shortlisted as one of the nine films in contention to be the Dutch entry for the Academy Award for Best International Feature Film at the 92nd Academy Awards, but it was not selected.
