= Gadalla Gubara =

Sudanese filmmaker and photographer

- جاد الله جبارة
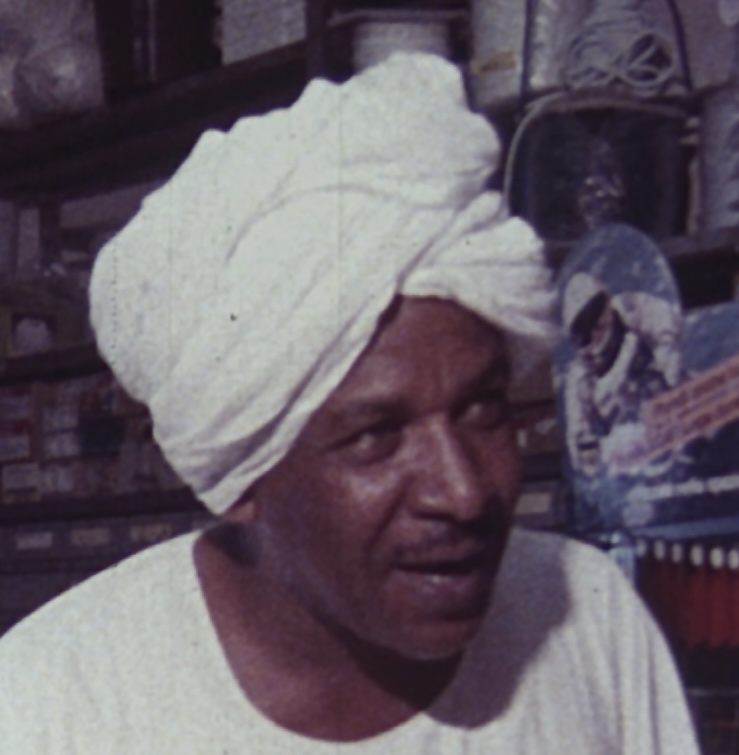
- Gubara in 1984
- Born: July 1920; Omdurman, Anglo-Egyptian Sudan
- Died: 21 August 2008 (aged 88)
- Occupations: Cameraman, film producer, filmmaker, photographer
- Notable work: Tajouje
- Children: 8 including Sara Gadalla Gubara

Gadalla Gubara (Arabic: جاد الله جبارة, July 1920 – 21 August 2008) was a Sudanese cameraman, film producer, director and photographer. Over five decades, he produced more than 50 documentaries and three feature films. He was a pioneer of African cinema, and a co-founder of both the Pan-African Federation of Filmmakers FEPACI and the FESPACO Film festival, held in Ouagadougou, Burkina Faso. His daughter, Sara Gubara, who is a graduate of Cairo Higher Institute of Cinema, Egypt, assisted him with his later film projects, after he had lost his eyesight.

== Early life and education ==
Gubara was born in Omdurman, Sudan, in July 1920. His father was a farmer, and a part of the extended family of Muhammad Ahmad. During World War II, he served as an officer in the Royal Corps of Signals on the North African campaign. There, the Colonial Film Unit screened films such as Desert Victory, Our African Soldiers on Active Service and With Our African Troops in the Middle East for the troops. This was Gubara's first exposure to film, leading him to seek further training after the war, while stationed in London and Cyprus.

After his training, the British Film Unit commissioned him to return to Sudan and make educational films about the country's agriculture schemes to be screened to local audiences across the country.

== Career ==
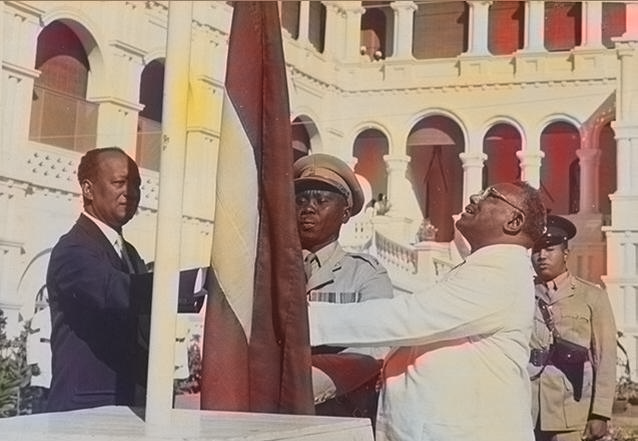
Sudan's flag raised at its independence ceremony, on 1st January 1956, photo by Gadalla Gubara

Gubara was one of Sudan's first photographers, capturing for example the raising of the flag of the newly independent country on January 1, 1956. In a late recognition, some of his photographs were presented in 2015 at the retrospective exhibition 'The Khartoum School: the making of the modern art movement in Sudan (1945–present)' by the Sharjah Art Foundation, UAE.

In 1955, Gubara produced Africa's first colour film, Song of Khartoum, a contribution to the genre of documentary films about avant-garde cities. The years following independence in 1956 were marked by an atmosphere of political and cultural awakening in Sudan. Gubara became the main filmmaker for the newly established Sudan Film Unit under the Ministry of Culture and Information. During this period, he documented many events and everyday life with his camera: Government meetings with president Gamal Abdel Nasser of Egypt or Ethiopian emperor Haile Selassi on a state visit, the nightlife of Khartoum, the construction of railway lines, factories and dams. At the end of the 1950s, he received a grant to continue his film studies at the University of Southern California, and was appointed as director of the Sudan Film Unit upon his return in 1962.

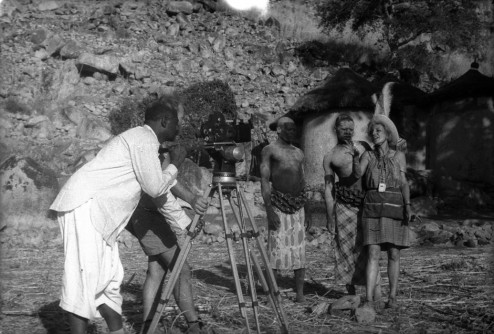
Gadalla Gubara with German photographer Leni Riefenstahl in the Nuba Mountains, Sudan, before 1973

Gubara was a co-founder of both the Pan-African Federation of Filmmakers FEPACI and the FESPACO Film festival, held in Ouagadougou, Burkina Faso.

Wanting to produce his own documentaries and, most of all, feature films, he left the Sudan Film Unit and set up Sudan's first private film studio, Studio Gad, in 1974. His first feature film Tajouj (1977) is a dramatic story about the unhappy love of two suitors towards the heroine, set in rural Eastern Sudan, and featured the actor Salah ibn Al Badya. Tajouj won the Nefertiti Statue, Egypt's highest film award, at the Cairo International Film Festival in 1982, and won prizes at film festivals in Alexandria, Ouagadougou, Tehran, Addis Ababa, Berlin, Moscow, Cannes and Carthage.

In 1984, Gubara published a semi-documentary short film called 'Viva Sara'. It tells the story of his daughter Sara, who despite her physical handicap from having suffered from polio as a child, became Sudan's first participant in an international competition for swimmers between the island of Capri and the city of Naples in Italy.

Gadalla lost his sight at the age of 80, when his studio had been confiscated by the government, but still continued with his last film projects, with his daughter Sara Gadalla Gubara assisting him. In 2006, he received the 'Award for Excellence' for his career at the Africa Movie Academy Awards.

== Reception ==
Highlighting perhaps Gubara's most prolific era, the Sudanese author Omar Zaki wrote:

Gubara's films from the 1960s and 70s capture what many refer to as "the Golden Era of Sudan" when Khartoum was the Beirut ... or ... the Paris of Africa. At the time, Khartoum was a multicultural city with dozens of Catholic, Protestant, Coptic, and Ethiopian churches, and a variety of ethnic communities - Jewish, Armenian, Syrian, Greek, Lebanese, and Serbian. This rings true with Gubara's memories of the capital: Khartoum was an open city; it had all kinds of amusements, it had nightclubs. People can play freely, can dance...But when the sharia started with Nimeiry, Khartoum became just like an Islamic town.

In 2008, filmmaker Frédérique Cifuentes made a documentary film about Gubara, called Cinema in Sudan: Conversations with Gadalla Gubara, part of which was made available in Sudan Memory's online archive. Between 2014 and 2016, many of Gubara's films were digitised by the Arsenal Institute for Film and Video Art in Berlin, Germany, and have been shown again to audiences in Sudan as well as abroad.

== Filmography (feature films) ==
- Tajouj (1977)
- Barakat Al-Sheikh (The Sheikh's Blessings, 1998)
- Les misérables, adaptation of the novel by Victor Hugo (2006)

== See also ==
- Cinema of Sudan
- Photography of Sudan
