= Madih nabawi =

Music in praise of the Islamic Prophet Muhammad

Madih nabawi (Arabic: مديح نبوي, pl. Madā'ih nabawiyah), one of the principal religious genres of Arabic music, is a song form dedicated to expressing praise, love and devotion for the Islamic prophet Muhammad and his family. The genre dates from 632 CE, immediately after the death of Muhammad, but the performers address Muhammad. It is also a Sufi genre of belletristic Arab literature.

== Description and subgenres ==
A typical performance includes a solo singer, accompanied by a chorus of men with frame drums, the chorus singing a refrain which the soloist improvisationally answers through variation, paraphrasing, or transformation of the refrain, emphasising the characteristics of the respective maqam row or scale.. The chorus sings in unison and a new verse of poetry and prayers or blessings for the audience are added at certain places during the chorus. In North Africa, it resembles ma'luf or andalusi nubah, in Egypt the dur, in Syria the muwashshah, and in Iraq the maqam al-iraqi.

According to the article about Islamic religious music in the New Grove Dictionary of Music, "Northern Sudan has a famous madih tradition, going back to Hajj El-Mahi of Kassinger (c 1780–1870), who composed about 330 religious poems of which handwritten copies survive. They are performed by pairs of male singers with the accompaniment of two frame drums (ṭār), at religious festivities, at markets or outside mosques."

Musical genres or subgenres in the madih repertoire include tanzilah ("revelation"), ibtihal ("supplication"), tawassul ("beseechment"), tawshih, and muwashshah.

== See also ==
- Durood
- Haḍra
- Hamd
- Mawlid
- Mawsim
- Mehfil
- Na'at
- Nasheed
- Arabic music
- Islamic music
- Islamic poetry
- Sufi music
- Sufi poetry
- Sufism
- Ya Muhammad
