= Talking About Trees =

2019 documentary film from Sudan

- Film Poster
- Arabic: الحديث عن الأشجار
- Directed by: Suhaib Gasmelbari
- Release date: 2019
- Running time: 90
- Country: Sudan
- Languages: Sudanese Arabic; English

Talking About Trees (Arabic: الحديث عن الأشجار) is a 2019 documentary film directed by Sudanese film director Suhaib Gasmelbari. It follows the efforts of the Sudanese Film Group, represented by retired filmmakers Ibrahim Shadad, Manar Al Hilo, Suleiman Mohamed Ibrahim and Altayeb Mahdi, to reopen an outdoor movie theater in the city of Omdurman in the face of decades of Islamist censorship and inefficient bureaucracy. According to film critic Jay Weissberg, the title of the film "comes from Bertolt Brecht’s 1940 poem To Those Born Later, in which he laments the suppression of discussion under dictatorship, and how shifting the discourse to mundane topics painfully draws attention to what can’t be spoken aloud."

== Synopsis ==
Four Sudanese friends who studied film-making at foreign institutions in Germany and Russia have reunited in Sudan as old men. They run the Sudanese Film Group, which hosts screenings of films. They speak on a radio program, recalling the 1989 military coup which led to their arrests and exile and ended an era of Sudanese filmmaking in the 1970s and 1980s.

They try to open a cinema in Omdurman, which they seek to make free to the public and free from censorship or state influence. They find an old outdoor theater called The Revolution whose owner is willing to let them rent it. They struggle to fix up the dilapidated venue, including obtaining a projector, renting chairs, painting a sign, and repainting a wall to be the screen. Hana, a member of the Sudanese Film Group, attempts to get permits for the screening but is faced with intransigent bureaucracy and wary morality police who question the film group's desire to open a cinema and choice of films.

Meanwhile, the filmmakers reminisce about the films they made in their youth. Ibrahim Shadad talks about his short graduation film Jagdpartie (Hunting Party), that he made in 1964 at the Deutsche Hochschule für Filmkunst Potsdam-Babelsberg in East Germany. This symbolic story about racism was shot in a forest in Brandenburg, and employs the genre of Western movies for the hunting of an African man. Also, Shadad talks about his 14-minute documentary Jamal (Camel) that he produced in Sudan in 1981, featuring the work of a camel in a sesame mill. Suleiman Ibrahim recovers from Moscow the film he made for his thesis, Africa, The Jungle, Drums, and Revolution.

The filmmakers witness the re-election of President Omar al-Bashir in 2015 with over 90% of the vote and doubt the election's integrity. Shadad directs, shoots, and edits a film based on his experiences as a prisoner in the 1990s, featuring a prisoner in a small bathroom who has water dripping on his head but chooses not to move to avoid it.

The filmmakers survey the townspeople and based on their vote decide to screen Django Unchained. They try to schedule the screening so that the adhan from six surrounding mosques does not interrupt. During a private film screening of Modern Times, the adhan interrupts the filmmakers' introductory speech.

Ultimately, the authorities do not give the permits needed to open the cinema, and the inaugural public screening is cancelled. The film ends with Shadad rehearsing his welcome speech for the planned screening.

== Critical reception ==
On Rotten Tomatoes, the film has an approval rating of 100% based on reviews from 14 critics. A review in the British newspaper The Guardian characterized the film as follows: "First-time director Suhaib Gasmelbari takes a meditative, gently observational approach here. He chooses not to directly interview the four film-makers; instead, what unfolds is a rather lovely poetic portrait of male friendship, cinephilic obsession and elegant dignity."

Following its premiere at the Berlin International Film Festival, Talking about Trees received numerous awards at film festivals worldwide. In 2019, the film also was awarded the Variety MENA Talent Award at the El Gouna Film Festival in Egypt, where Weissberg said, "It is really a film as well that speaks to all of us about what cinema means to us; about the beauty of seeing a film as an audience, of experiencing it collectively, rather than watching it on our iPads, rather than watching it on our cellphones; that the importance of having that with us is so vital."

== Awards ==
- Original Documentary Award and Audience Award, 69th Berlin International Film Festival, Germany, 2019
- Grand Jury Prize, Mumbai Film Festival, India, 2019
- Variety MENA Award and Golden Star, Best Feature Documentary, El Gouna Film Festival, Egypt, 2019
- Jury Prize, Hamptons International Film Festival, USA, 2019
- International Film Critics Award FIPRESCI and Jury Prize, Istanbul Film Festival, Turkey, 2019.
- Tanit d'or for Best Documentary, JCC Carthage Film Festival, Tunis, 2019
- Grand Jury Prize, Mumbai International Film Festival, India, 2019
- Best Feature Documentary, Palm Springs Film Festival, US, 2020
- Audience Award, Lama Film Festival, France, 2019
- Best Debut Film, Miradasdoc, Spain, 2019
- Documentaire sur grand ecran award, Amiens Film Festival, France, 2019
- Best feature documentary, Critics Award, Arab Cinema Center, 2020
- Best feature Documentary, Malmö Arab Film Festival, Sweden, 2020
- Audience Award for best film, Malmo Arab Film Festival, Sweden, 2020
- ACERCA award of the Spanish cooperation, Tarifa-Tangiers African Film Festival, 2020
- Audience Award for best feature film, Tarifa-Tangiers African Film Festival, Spain, 2020
- Golden Kapok Award (Best First Feature Documentary Award), Guangzhou International Documentary Film Festival, China, 2020
- Jury Special mentions: Athena Film Festival, Free Zone Human Rights FF, Gabès Film Festival

== See also ==
- Cinema of Sudan
