= Faiza Ambah =

Saudi Arabian journalist

Faiza Saleh Ambah
- Occupation: Journalist

Faiza Saleh Ambah is a Saudi Arabian film writer-director and former journalist for The Washington Post. She is also noted as having been one of the first female Saudi journalists.

== Career ==
She was one of the first, if not the first, female Saudi journalists to become a working reporter for a Saudi news organization when she joined the Arab News in the late 1980s. She was later a writer with The Associated Press, based in the United Arab Emirates, then for The Christian Science Monitor. Beginning in 2006, she worked for a period as a correspondent for The Washington Post's Foreign Service in Saudi Arabia.

She left her job as Gulf Correspondent for The Washington Post in 2009 to focus on filmmaking and recently completed a summer program at the USC School of Cinematic Arts. Faiza documented her experience at Sundance Institute's RAWI Screenwriters Lab in Jordan where she honed her storytelling skills under the guidance of Creative Advisors.

She worked on a script A Reverence for Spiders and was selected to participate in a Sundance Institute program.

In 2015, a French-language film "Mariam" which she wrote and directed, dealing with a teenage French Muslim girl's dilemma over wearing an hijab after it was banned in schools, was released.

== Family ==
Her father, Dr. Saleh Ambah, was the College of Petroleum and Mineral's Dean of Students before being imprisoned by order of King Faisal for expounding democratic ideals against the authoritarian rule of the Al Saud.
