= Ayin Network =

Journalist collective in Sudan

The Ayin Network is a collective of Sudanese journalists working under pseudonyms founded in 2013. Ayin Network highlights and reports issues and topics repressed by Sudan’s mainstream media.

== History ==
Founded in 2013, Ayin Network started in the Nuba Mountains during Omar al-Bashir’s government, where freedom of the press was restricted. Ayin is 'eye' in Arabic and 'to look' in the Sudanese dialect.

In 2025, 75% of Ayin Network’s funding was cut after USAID's global funding cuts in 2025 in the Donald Trump administration.
