= Sudan Independent Film Festival =

Film festival in Sudan

Sudan Independent Film Festival (SIFF) is an annual festival for Sudanese and international films in Khartoum. Since 2014, it has been organised between January 21–27 by the Sudan Film Factory. Since its beginning, it has served as a showcase for new Sudanese films and as an opportunity for networking for film professionals in East Africa and the wider region.

== History and scope of the festival ==
The Sudan Film Factory is a privately run, non-commercial organisation for the promotion of cinema and film production in Sudan. As there is no specialised film school for training and no public funding for producing and presenting movies in Sudan, film curator Talal Afifi and other Sudanese filmmakers founded the Sudan Film Factory (SFF) in 2013 as an independent platform "to build the capacities of young Sudanese talents, produce films and expose Sudanese audiences to film making and cinema." Since 2010, it has organised trainings for Sudanese filmmakers, in cooperation with foreign as well as local experienced film professionals and cultural organisations. As a result of these workshops, the German cultural centre and the Sudan Film Factory produced a number of short documentary films, published in 2012.

The opening night on 21 January 2014 was chosen to commemorate the legacy of Hussein Shariffe (1934–21 Jan 2005), a pioneer of cinema in Sudan. The opening film for the first edition was Faisal goes West, a short film, written and directed by American filmmaker Bentley Brown of long-standing relations with Sudan, and with actors from the American-Sudanese diaspora, such as Ramey Dawoud.

According to the organisers, the festival’s debut in 2014 was attended by film critics, directors and producers from Sudan and the wider region. Even though public film shows had almost come to an end during the military and Islamist government of Omar al-Bashir since 1989, the festival attracted more than 7,000 viewers during its week of events and was covered by local and international media. Owing to its success, the festival has since contributed to the participation of Sudanese films in festivals in the Gulf countries and Egypt, and also in Europe, the United States or Asia.

In 2019, the festival had to be suspended due to the ongoing events of the Sudanese Revolution. The following year, the 6th edition was dedicated to the revolutionary movement in Sudan, that had ushered in a new period in the country's history.

== See also ==
- Cinema of Sudan
- You Will Die at Twenty (2019 Sudanese feature film)
- Khartoum Offside (2019 Sudanese documentary film)
- Talking About Trees (2019 Sudanese documentary film)
