= Amjad Abu Alala =

Sudanese filmmaker and producer

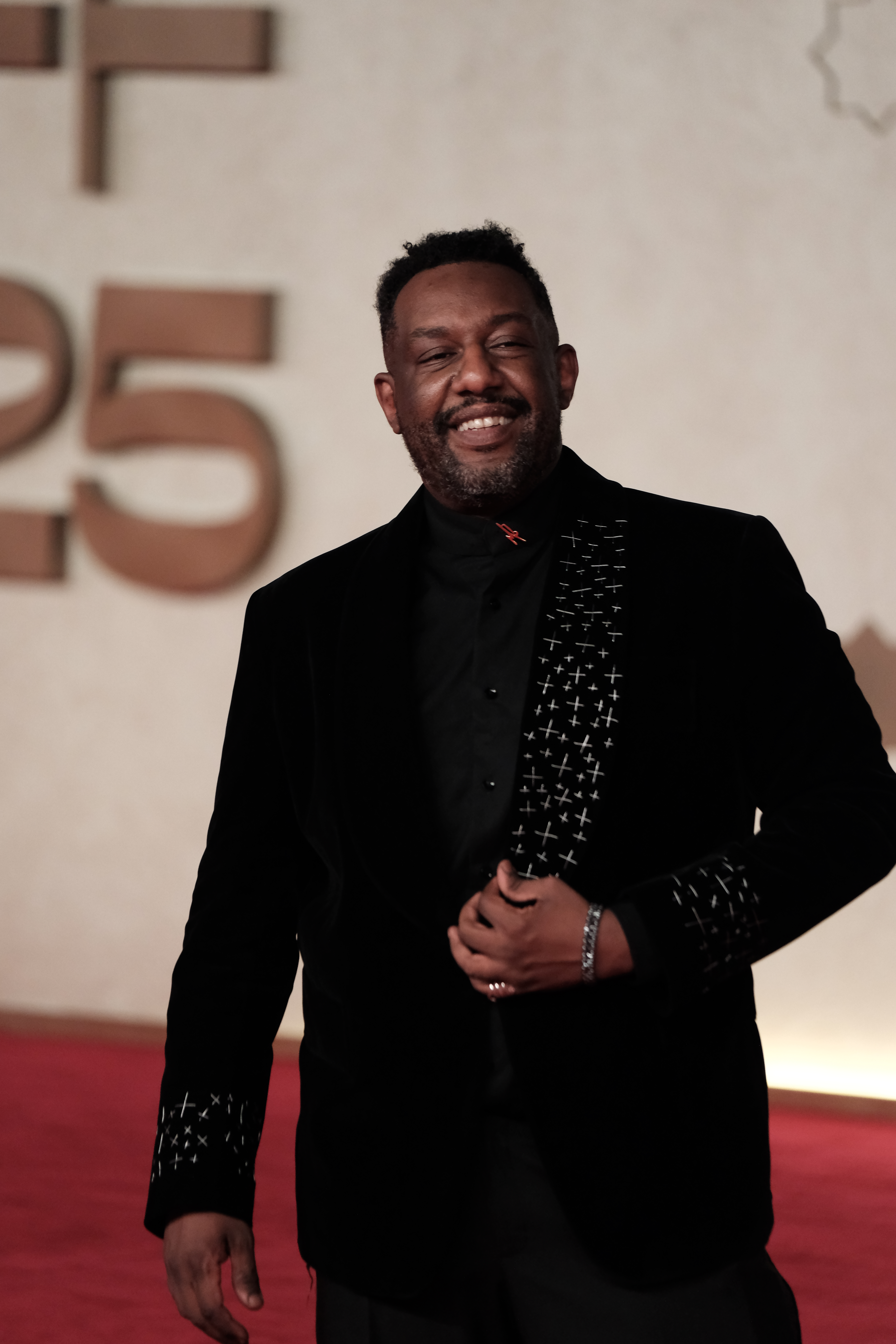
- Abu Alala in 2025
- Born: Dubai, United Arab Emirates
- Occupation: Filmmaker producer
- Education: United Arab Emirates University

Amjad Abu Alala (Arabic: أمجد أبو العلا, born in Dubai) is a Sudanese filmmaker and producer, who was born and lives in the United Arab Emirates. He is most known for his debut feature film You Will Die at Twenty (2019), which won the Lion of the Future for Best First Film at the 76th Venice International Film Festival.

== Early life ==
Abu Alala was born and raised in the United Arab Emirates to Sudanese parents who came from Wad Madani in central Sudan. He studied media and communication science at Emirates University before starting his career as a filmmaker making documentaries for Arab and Western TV stations. During this time, he also directed four short films.

== Career ==
Intent on exploring his roots and telling a Sudanese story accessible to both a Sudanese and global audience for his first feature film, Abu Alala adapted Sleeping at the Foot of the Mountain, a 2014 short story by Sudanese writer Hammour Ziada, into his first feature film.

In 2013, Abu Alala won the Best Arabic Theatre Script Award for his script Apple Pies. Promoting Sudanese films, he has also been involved in the selection for the Sudan Independent Film Festival in Khartoum, and the Arab Film Institute.

You Will Die at Twenty (2019) premiered at the Giornate degli Autori section of the 76th Venice International Film Festival in 29 August, where it won the Lion of the Future for Best First Feature Film. It was also screened at the 2019 Toronto International Film Festival. The film was shot during the 2019 Sudanese revolution which saw the military ouster of Omar al-Bashir after having ruled the country for almost 30 years. The uprising compounded challenges the filmmakers faced from government restrictions and the need to fly in several tons of equipment due to the lack of a Sudanese film infrastructure. It was Sudan first ever entry for the Academy Award for Best International Feature Film, for the 93rd Academy Awards, but was not nominated.

As a producer, Abu Alala founded a creative laboratory in collaboration with the Doha Film Institute and produced five short films.

In 2021, he was selected as a jury member for the First Feature competition of the 74th Locarno Film Festival.

== Influences ==
In 2022, Abu Alala participated in the Sight & Sound film polls of that year. It is held every ten years to select the greatest films of all time, by asking contemporary directors to name ten films of their choice. His selections were:

- 12 Angry Men (1957)
- Persona (1966)
- Mirror (1975)
- Cairo Station (1958)
- Eternity and a Day (1998)
- Akira Kurosawa's Dreams (1966)
- Taste of Cherry (1997)
- Dancer in the Dark (2000)
- A Short Film About Killing (1987)
- The Turin Horse (2011)

== Filmography ==
=== Feature films ===
- 2019: You Will Die at Twenty (ستموت في العشرين), feature film

=== Short films ===
- 2004: Coffee and Oranges
- 2005: Birds' Feathers
- 2009: Teena
- 2012: Studio

== Accolades ==
El Gouna Film Festival, Egypt, 2019

- Golden Star in the section for Narrative Competition: You Will Die at Twenty

Venice Film Festival 2019

- Lion of the Future for best first film: You Will Die at Twenty

== See also ==
- Cinema of Sudan
