= Arab Fund for Arts and Culture =

Cultural organization for the Arab world

Arab Fund for Arts & Culture (AFAC)
- Founded: 2007
- Type: non governmental organization
- Location: Beirut, Lebanon
- Region served: Arab countries
- Website: www.arabculturefund.org

The Arab Fund for Arts and Culture (AFAC) (Arabic: الصندوق العربي للثقافة والفنون) is an independent, non-profit NGO that funds individuals and cultural organizations in the Arab region. By awarding grants for partial funding of cultural projects and other forms of support, AFAC facilitates projects in the fields of cinema, performing arts, literature, music and visual arts, and encourages cultural exchange, research and cooperation across the Arab region and globally.

Based on ongoing financial and institutional support mainly from businesspeople and organizations in the Arab region, AFAC also aims at strengthening philanthropy for the arts, and works with the private sector to promote entrepreneurship in cultural and artistic productions. The fund's activities are overseen by a Board of Trustees, headed by academic Ghassan Salamé and run by a management team with former journalist Rima Mismar as Executive Director.

The impact of AFAC's activities includes the screening of their grantee's films at international film festivals, translations of foreign contemporary literature into Arabic, distributed for free on the Internet, archives that collect, document and preserve images of daily life, workshops teaching children to create stories through puppetry and animation and sharing contemporary narratives from the Arab region with global audiences.

== Aims and activities ==
According to their website, "AFAC was founded in 2007 through the initiative of Arab cultural activists as an independent foundation to support individual artists, writers, researchers, intellectuals, as well as organizations from the Arab region working in the field of arts and culture. Since its launch, AFAC’s programs have steadily expanded to cover cinema, photography, visual and performing arts, creative and critical writings, music, documentary film, in addition to funding research, trainings and cultural events. Based in Beirut, AFAC works with artists and organizations all over the Arab region and the rest of the world."

Each year, about 1500 applications have been submitted across all programs. The evaluation process takes place in two stages, described as "a preselection by a committee of readers and a final selection by a committee of jurors. Each program has its own specialized and independent readers' committee and jury whose members are selected anew every year."

In total, AFAC's grants, that typically range from USD 5.000 for individuals to more than USD 10.000 for organizations, include next to 200 grants per year, awarded by genre-specific juries of experts after open calls for eligible grantees to submit applications. These grants are attached to ten programs: Performing Arts, Visual Arts, the AFAC Documentary Film Program, Music, the Research on the Arts Program, Creative and Critical Writings, Training and Regional Events, Cinema, the Arab Documentary Photography Program and the Arts and Culture Entrepreneurship.

In addition to awarding grants, AFAC organizes programs for training and mentorship aiming to improve skills and practices, as in their Arts and Culture Entrepreneurship and the Arab Documentary Photography programs.

As an activity of knowledge building and sharing, AFAC continually is enlarging its online database with more than 10,000 applicants and 1,350 funded projects as of 2022. This constitutes a source of information on contemporary cultural trends in the Arab region, as well as on different forms of artistic production, social impact, geographic contexts, and relevant statistics. This information is further shared through reports, info-graphics, grantees’ stories and reports of field visits to individual countries.

Being dependent on ongoing financial and institutional support for their arts programs, AFAC is active in strengthening philanthropy for the arts, and works with the private sector to promote entrepreneurship in cultural and artistic productions. It aims to "expand and diversify sources of funding for artists, writers, intellectuals and researchers, as well as organizations that present artistic and cultural content".

As part of their policy of transparent accountability and knowledge sharing, AFAC has been publishing their annual reports of activities, audit reports and a 10-year evaluation online.

== Major achievements ==
According to their webpage, AFAC has raised slightly more than US$47 million and allocated almost US$36 million (equal to 75%) as grants to projects from 2007 to 2021. At the same time, they report to have received more than 15.000 applications.

AFAC supports projects both by established and emerging artists mainly from the Arab world. As of 2022, regional projects have included Algeria, Bahrain, Comoros, Egypt, Iraq, Jordan, Kuwait, Lebanon, Libya, Morocco, Oman, Palestine, Saudi Arabia, Somalia, Sudan, Syria, Tunisia, United Arab Emirates, and Yemen. Emerging artists and women grantees have made up roughly 42% and 30% respectively, while around 27% of the projects have been implemented by institutions.

AFAC donors and corporate sponsors include the Ford Foundation, Open Society Foundations, Magnum Foundation, Andrew Mellon Foundation, Boghossian Foundation, Prince Claus Fund and others. In 2020, Netflix and AFAC started their Hardship Fund for filmmaking in Lebanon, valued at US$100 million and from 2021 onwards, another partnership between AFAC and the Netflix Fund for Creative Equity in the Arab world, valued at US$250.000, announced financial support to women filmmakers in the Arab world. Grants from AFAC have helped Arab filmmakers participate in international festivals such as the Berlin Film Festival and Cannes Film Festival. Two of the program's documentary films were nominated for an Academy Award, and another two won the World Documentary Grand Jury Prize of the Sundance Film Festival. Further, grantees of its Arab Documentary Photography Program won the World Press Photo Contest Open Format (Africa) and the Premis Mediterrani Albert Camus Incipiens Award.

In the summer of 2020, AFAC and Culture Resource organization Al-Mawred al-Thaqafi created the Lebanon Solidarity Fund to support artists and cultural workers affected by the Lebanese liquidity crisis and the 2020 Beirut explosion which also affected AFAC's offices. In May 2022, Aflamuna (Our films), a free regional film streaming service founded during COVID lockdown began streaming a selection of 15 feature films from the 154 films AFAC has supported over the years.

In September 2022, AFAC published a needs assessment report on the status of cultural and creative industries (CCI) in Yemen, prepared in collaboration with UNESCO. The report focused on the current socio-political and economic context of CCI in Hadramout, Aden, Sana’a, and the Yemeni diaspora. Additionally, it presented general insight on CCI during the ongoing crises across the Arab region.

== Outlook and future projects ==
Through international networking and lending public visibility to their activities and their grantees cultural productions, AFAC aims at building wider audiences and awareness, both in the Arab region and internationally. As new projects starting from 2022, AFAC will attempt to form new alliances and enlarging public access to culture by supporting grantees in important and innovative forms of cultural journalism. For this, AFAC will cooperate with two non-profit organizations dedicated to supporting independent Arabic-language journalism, – the Counter Academy for Arab Journalism and the Berlin-based independent Arab media organisation Febrayer Network.

In a 2022 interview with the Lebanese newspaper L'Orient-LeJour, looking back on the first 15 years of AFAC's activities, executive director Rima Mismar described Beirut and the wider region as a place where "crisis is not the exception, but the norm". Being directly confronted with the ongoing crises in the city and Lebanon at large, she maintained that the management of AFAC nevertheless is pursuing their strategic objectives to serve the whole Arab region.

== See also ==
- Arab culture
