= Rashid Mahdi =

Sudanese photographer (1923–2008)

- Born: 1923; Atbara Sudan
- Died: 2008 (aged 84–85)
- Known for: documentary and portrait photography

Rashid Mahdi (Arabic: رشيد مهدي, 1923 – 2008) was a Sudanese photographer, active in Atbara from the 1950s to the 1970s. French photographer Claude Iverné, founder of a large archive of photographs dedicated to this "Golden Age" of photography in Sudan, called Mahdi "certainly the most sophisticated and one of the major African photographers of the 20th century."

Most prominently, Mahdi's photographs were presented at the African Photography Encounters in Bamako, Mali, in 2005, in a personal exhibition during the Paris Photo fair in 2011, as well as at the 2017 retrospective exhibition "The Khartoum School: the making of the modern art movement in Sudan (1945 – present)", presented by the Sharjah Art Foundation, United Arab Emirates. His work is also represented in the collection of the Musée du quai Branly in Paris.

== Biography and artistic career ==
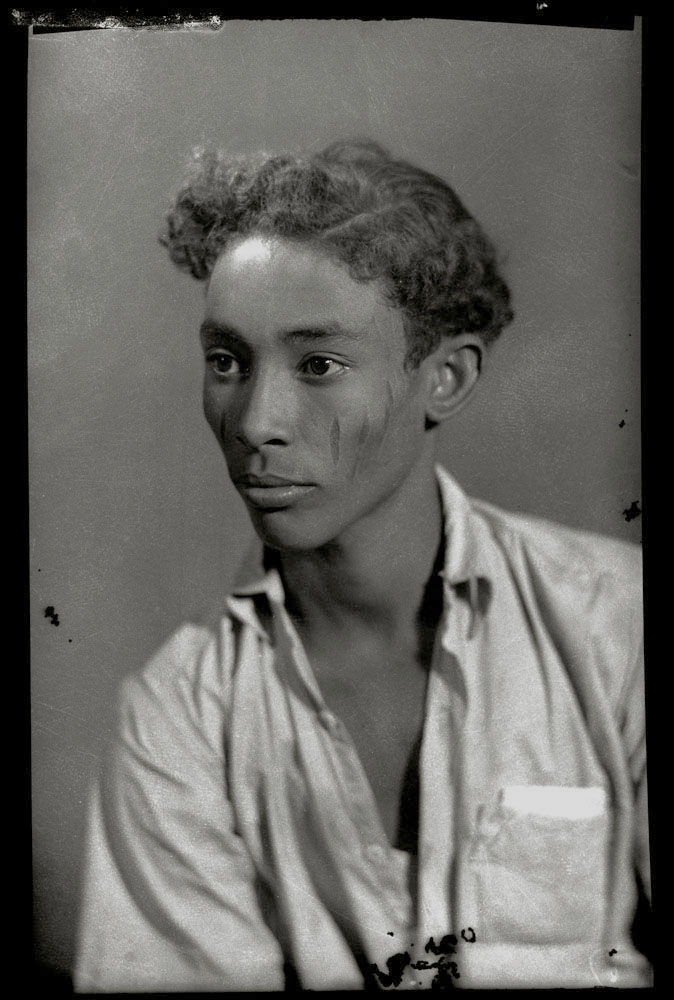
"Man with scarifications", by Rashid Mahdi

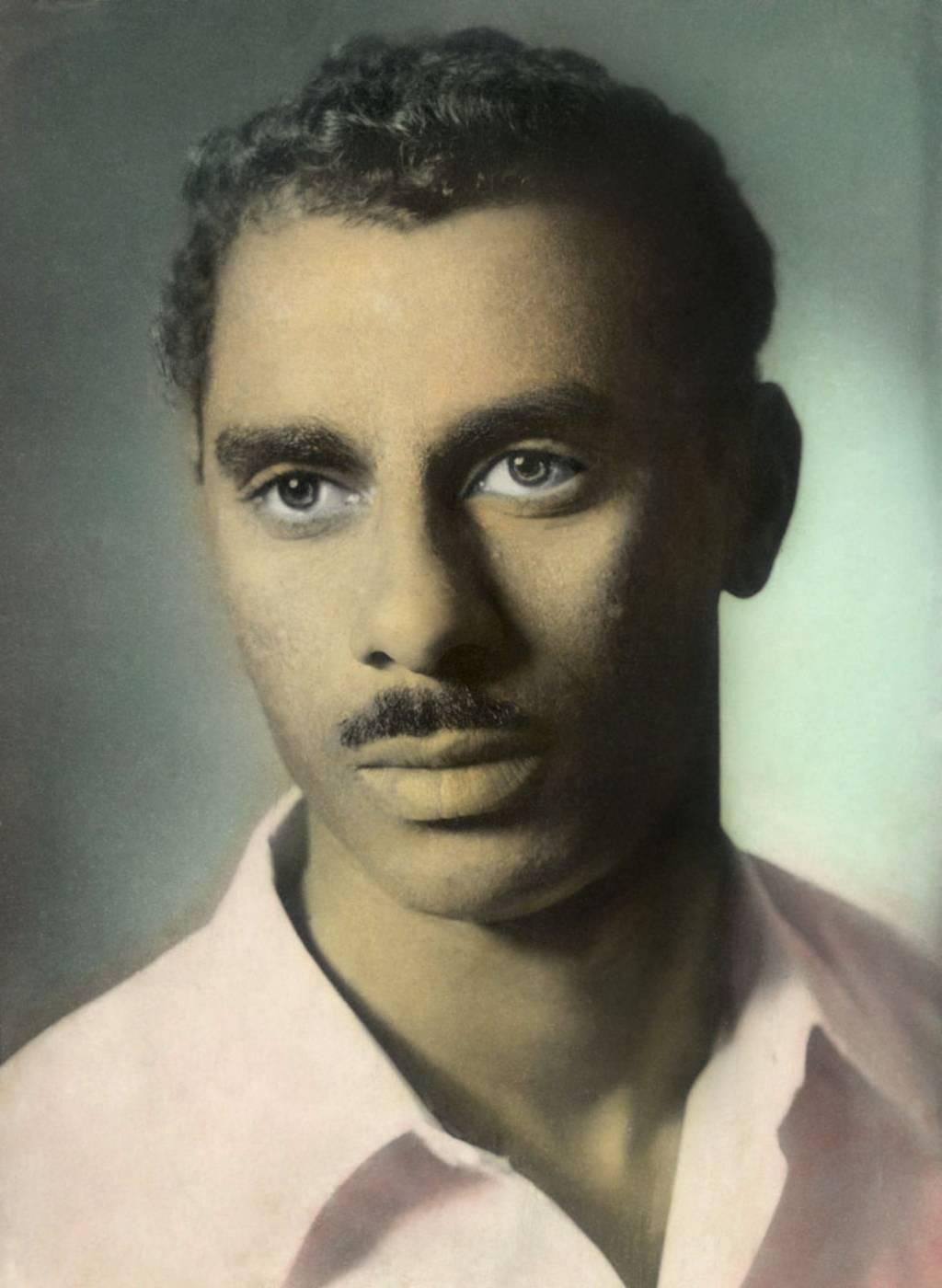
Portrait of an unknown man, by Rashid Mahdi, 1960

Initially, Mahdi was trained in woodworking at the technical college in Omdurman and was destined to work for the colonial Sudanese railways. He worked as a carpenter for some time, but photography attracted him more. Upon graduation, he bought his first camera from a Greek photographer and taught himself in his new activity. In order to improve his skills, he corresponded with Kodak in London and in 1957 was invited to visit Kodak representation in Cairo, Egypt.

Working as studio photographer from the 1950s to the 1970s in his home town of Atbara, Mahdi was one of the early Sudanese photographers. In 1957, he opened Rashid Photo Studio and produced mostly portraits of individuals or groups such as families, soldiers or members of religious groups. Over time, these images became historical documents, representing personal appearance and fashion of the day. Further, Mahdi documented local industry, politics and movements in Atbara, the centre of the Sudanese railway network, its movement of trade unions and of the activities of the Sudanese communist party. Using a 18 cm × 24 cm (7.1 in × 9.4 in) stand camera, Mahdi worked in black-and-white, but also hand-coloured some of his prints, sometimes using large formats. For the premiere of the first feature film in independent Sudan, Hopes & Dreams in the outdoor National Theatre Omdurman in 1970, directed by Ibrahim Mallassy and with Mahdi as director of photography, he documented the large number of spectators in one of his photographs.

After Rashid Mahdi's retirement, his son Amin El Rashid (born 1945), took over the studio until the mid-1990s. With its collection of photographs from the 1940s onwards, Rashid Studio became the largest photographic archive of the country, totalling more than four million negatives. A large number of these have been published online by the documentary project Sudan Memory.

== Reception ==
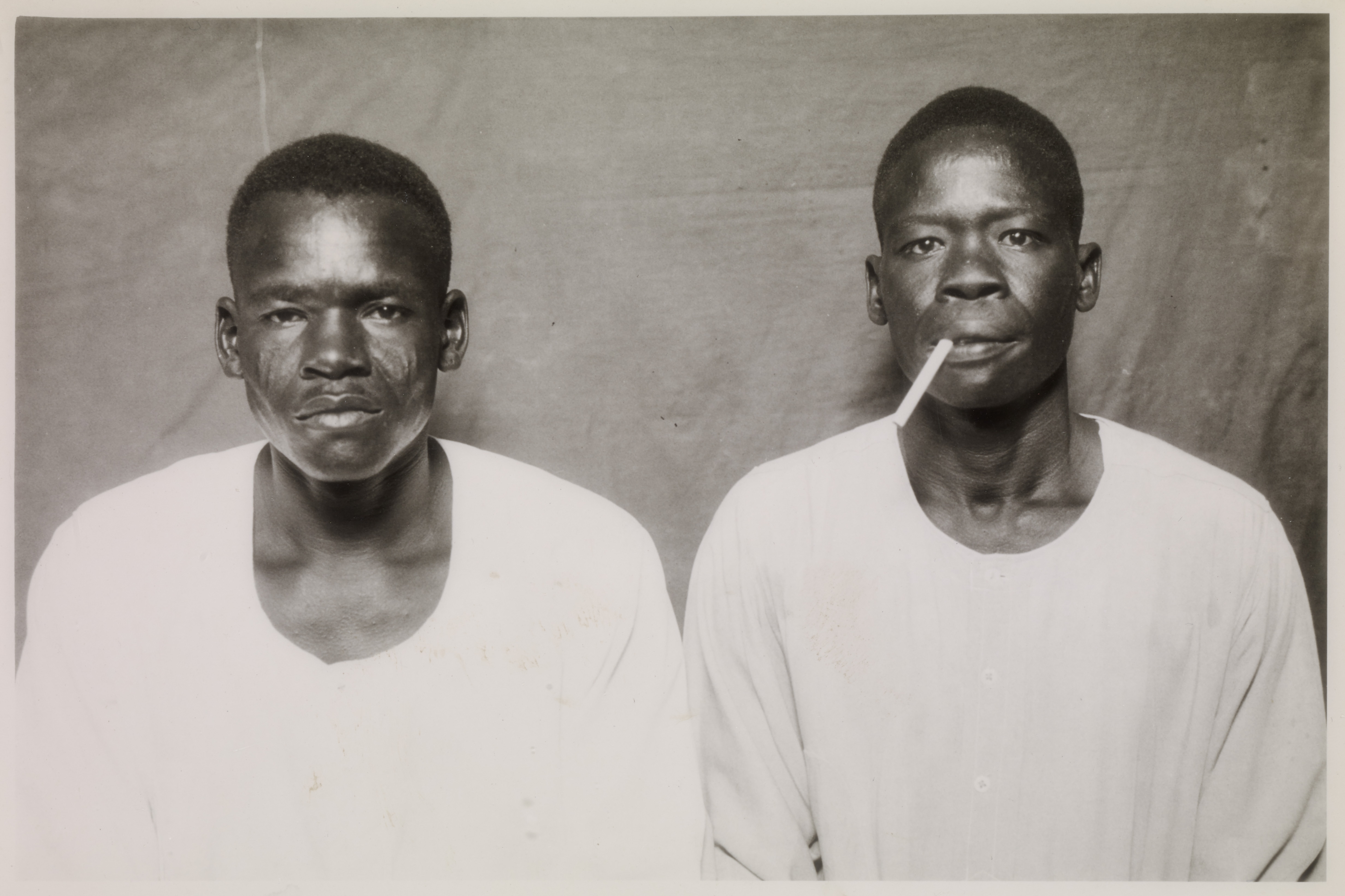
Portrait of two men, by Rashid Mahdi

On the occasion of his exhibition at the Galerie Clémentine de la Ferronnière in Paris, France, as part of the Paris Photo fair in 2011, Mahdi's work was characterized as "perfecting the image by intervening in multiple stages, both on the negative, then on the print." The same year, the French online art platform TK-21 wrote about Mahdi's work: "Mahdi established very early on a protocol for the production of large format portraits, which he would apply systematically and meticulously throughout his life. From the make-up of the subjects to the most elaborate light effects, he perfects the image by intervening at multiple stages on the negative and then on the print. His precise and refined images reveal a mainly bourgeois society of the North [Sudan], which affirms his independence with an unexpected sovereignty".

In an academic review of the retrospective art exhibition The Khartoum School: The Making of the Modern Art Movement in Sudan (1945–present) in Sharjah, UAE, 2017, the author writes about photography in Sudan: "The exhibition highlights the work of two pioneer master-photographers, Rashid Mahdi and Gadalla Gubara, as well as other studio photographers, [...] in the context of the historical linkages between photography, decolonisation and self-representation."

French photographer Claude Iverné, who also created his own photo stories of Sudan, characterised the photography of Mahdi and other photographers in Sudan of the 1970s as a "little known period of tremendous freedom, when going to a photo studio was like going to a bar." On his webpage, which claims to present a collection of about 12,000 digitized images from 1890 until 2015, Iverné has published many photographs by Rashid Mahdi, both in Iverné's own collection, as well as in that of the Musée du quai Branly in Paris. In an interview about his personal relationship with Sudanese photographers and their artistic work, Iverné gave the following account:

"Starting in 1983, successive regimes began enforcing Sharia law. The glorious days of the free image of the 1970s were even further compromised with the military coup of 1989. Those in power championed a rigid form of Islam. Showing those photographs in plain sight could get photographers in serious trouble. Some of them even destroyed their body of work. Others hid them locally, in poor conditions. I discovered these hidden treasures in the backrooms of stores, in humid, stuffy, dusty places."

— French photographer Claude Iverné, "Discovering Sudanese Photography"

== Exhibitions ==
- "Photographie Soudanaise", Usine Springcourt / Paris / France / 2012
- "The gifted man", Cultural Centre of Egypt / Paris / France / 2011
- "Lumières soudanaises", Rencontres photographiques du 10ème / Paris / France / 2011
- "Photographies Soudanaises", Galerie Clémentine de la Ferronnière / Paris / France /2011
- "Lumières Soudanaises", Flatteurville / Paris / France 2011
- "Nouvelles Africaines" / Africultures / Confluences, Paris / France / 2007
- "Rencontres Photographiques", Fez / Morocco / 2006
- "Another World", La Centrale Electrique / Brussels / Belgium / 2006
- "Sixth African Photography Encounters", Bamako / Mali / 2005

== See also ==
- Cinema of Sudan
- Photography in Sudan
