= Photography in Sudan =

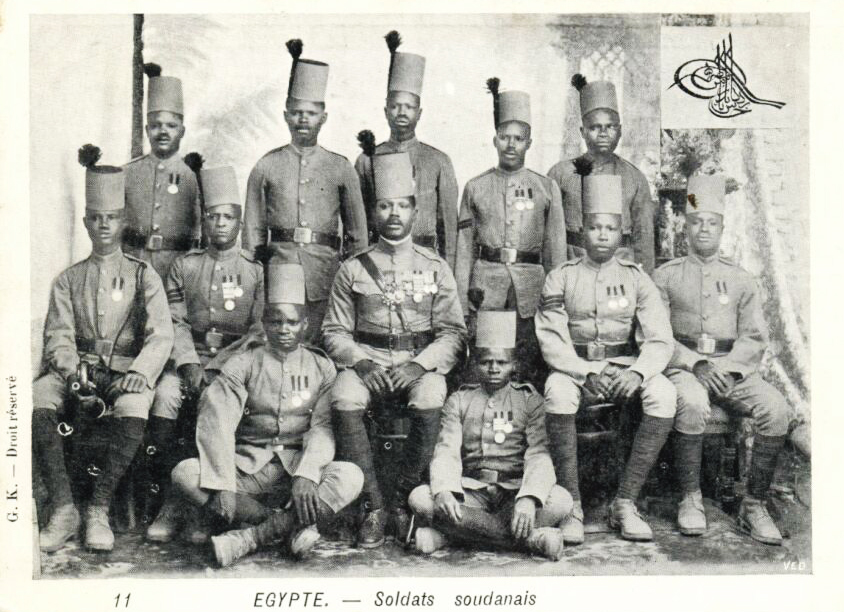
Sudanese soldiers in the Anglo-Egyptian army (unknown photographer, 1899)

Photography in Sudan refers to both historical as well as to contemporary photographs taken in the cultural history of today's Republic of the Sudan. This includes the former territory of present-day South Sudan, as well as what was once Anglo-Egyptian Sudan, and some of the oldest photographs from the 1860s, taken during the Turkish-Egyptian rule (Turkiyya). As in other countries, the growing importance of photography for mass media like newspapers, as well as for amateur photographers has led to a wider photographic documentation and use of photographs in Sudan during the 20th century and beyond. In the 21st century, photography in Sudan has undergone important changes, mainly due to digital photography and distribution through social media and the Internet.

After the earliest periods in the late 19th and early 20th centuries, for which only foreign photographers have been credited with photographs or films of life in Sudan, indigenous photographers like Gadalla Gubara or Rashid Mahdi added their own visions to the photographic inventory of the country from the 1950s onwards. In 2017, the Sudan Historical Photography Archive in Khartoum started to build a visual inventory of everyday life from Sudan's independence in 1956 until the early 1980s. As documented in the comprehensive exhibition at the Sharjah Art Foundation on "The making of the modern art movement in Sudan", this period also includes Gubara and Mahdi as photographic artists during the country's prolific period for modern art.

Since the end of World War II, professional photographers travelling the world, such as British photojournalist George Rodger, German filmmaker Leni Riefenstahl or photographer Sebastião Salgado from Brazil have created photographic stories of rural ethnic groups in southern Sudan that became famous in the history of photography in Sudan. (Note: Compare, for example, the following quote: "Indeed, probably the best known books of photographs of the Sudan are of the Nuba, Leni Riefenstahl's The Last of the Nuba and People of Kao..." (pp. 59-60) in Daly, Martin W.; Hogan, Jane R. (2005). Images of empire: photographic sources for the British in the Sudan. Brill. ISBN 978-90-04-14627-3. and the chapter George Rodgers Koronga Nuba wrestlers of Kordofan, South Sudan, 1949 (pp.18-19) in McCabe, Eamonn (2005). The making of great photographs: approaches and techniques of the masters. David & Charles. ISBN 978-0-7153-2220-8.) More recently, developments in tourism, global demand for photographs in mass media and the digital media of the 21st century have allowed an increasing number of Sudanese and foreign photographers to closely observe and record life in Sudan.

== Colonial period – from pictures of 'natives' to real people ==
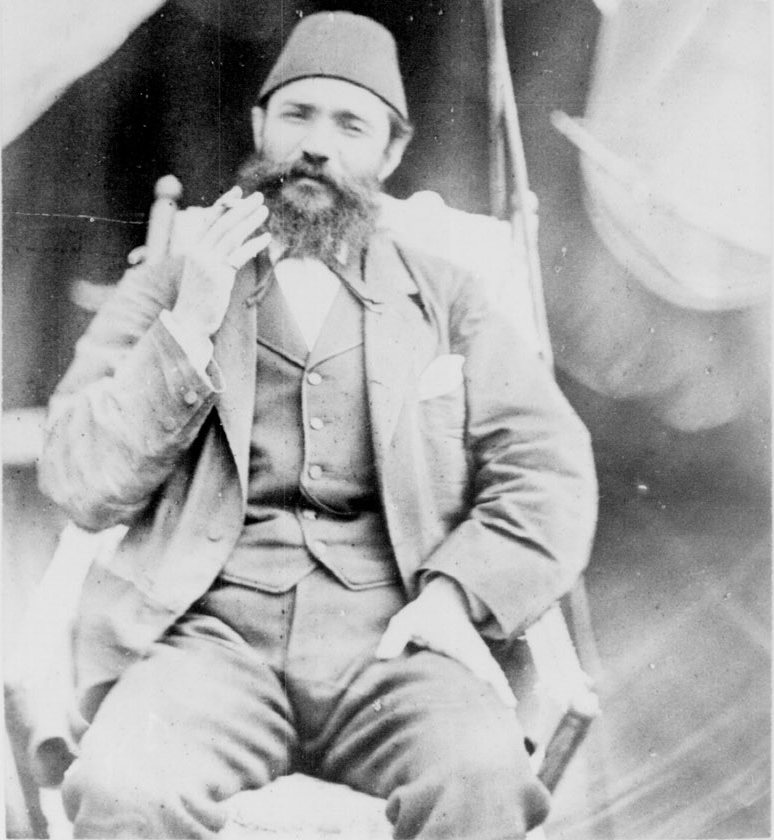
Nicola Leontides, the Greek consul in Sudan, photograph by French diplomat Louis Pierre Vossion, 1882

=== Early foreign photographers ===
The earliest existing photographs from Sudan were taken from the late 1840s onwards by French, British, Austrian or other foreign photographers and served as documents of life in Africa or the colonial enterprise. Among other archives, the digital collections of the New York Public Library have a number of such early photographs taken in the Sudan. An archive of several thousand photographs, mainly taken by British officials and visitors during the years from 1899 and up to the 1950s, is kept at the Sudan Archive at Durham University in the UK. (Note: In their book, The Sudan: Photographs from the Sudan Archive, the authors have published 240 photographs, presenting "events of historical or military significance, feats of engineering, and the daily life and recreation of the Sudanese and their temporary rulers." Daly, M. W.; Forbes, L. E.; Archive, Durham University Library Sudan (1994). The Sudan: photographs from the Sudan Archive, Durham University Library. Garnet Publishing. ISBN 978-1-873938-94-2.) The same university also holds several other archives of British colonial officers, including photographs from various cities and regions of Sudan, with an online catalogue.

Following his travels to Upper Egypt, Eastern Sudan and Ethiopia in 1847–1848, French photographer and author of scientific and ethnographic publications Pierre Trémaux published the second volume of his Voyage en Éthiopie, au Soudan Oriental et dans la Nigritie, dedicated to Sudan in 1862, including prints made from his photographs of people of Darfur, Sennar or the Nuba mountains.

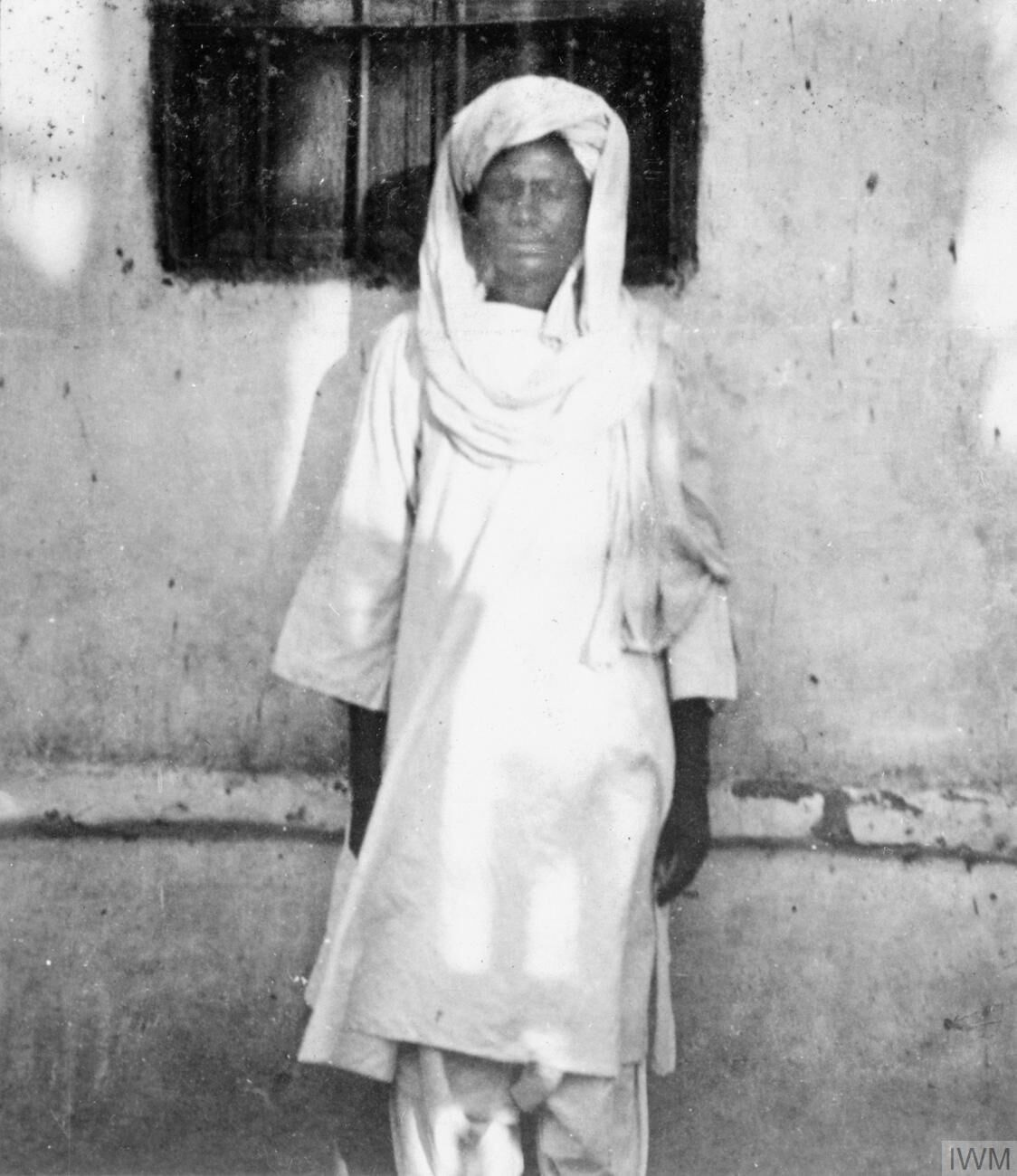
Emir Mahmoud as a prisoner of war, by Francis Gregson, 1898

In the 1880s, the Austrian explorer and photographer Richard Buchta published several books in German about his travels along the Nile, including a large number of photographs of ethnic people in southern Sudan. (Note: For his publications, see the list in the article on Richard Buchta and some of his photographs can be found in Wikimedia Commons under his name.) At the turn of 1884/85, the Italian-British photographer Felice Beato documented the unsuccessful Nile Expedition of the British Army that came to the aid of Charles George Gordon at Khartoum, who was besieged by Mahdist forces. (Note: In the book Felice Beato: A photographer on the Eastern Road, the authors give the following short account: 1885 - Beato travels to the Sudan to photograph the events of the Mahdist rebellion against the British, but arrives three months after the major events. On April 30, he meets Lord [Baron] G.J. Wolseley onboard ship from Suez to Suakim. (sic) He documents Wolseley's expedition to Suakim to superintend the withdrawal of the troops. Lacoste, Anne; Beato, Felice; J. Paul Getty Museum (2010). Felice Beato: A photographer on the Eastern Road. Getty Publications. p. 186. ISBN 978-1-60606-035-3.) Following the short-lived Mahdist State, the Anglo-Egyptian conquest of Sudan provided new opportunities for photographs of British military and civilian officials. At that time, the early technology of photography was extremely difficult and expensive to use, as large format cameras and glass plates were used. (Note: In his article "Capturing the light of the Nile" about the earliest photographs taken in Egypt, Jeff Koehler makes the following remarks about the photographic technology of the late 19th century: "The technology continued to improve and diversify, and the paper negatives were soon superseded by glass ones in the wet-collodion process that combined the sharpness of daguerreotypes with the reproducibility of calotypes." See Koehler 2015, in the section 'Further reading')

Accompanying the Anglo-Egyptian re-conquest of Sudan from 1896 to 1898, war correspondent Francis Gregson documented both the advance of British troops and the victory of Lord Kitchener's troops over the Mahdist forces in Khartoum 1898, his album of 232 silver gelatin print photographs. Among other photographs of defeated Sudanese, this includes a photograph of the commander at the Battle of Atbara, Emir Mahmoud, as a prisoner of war.

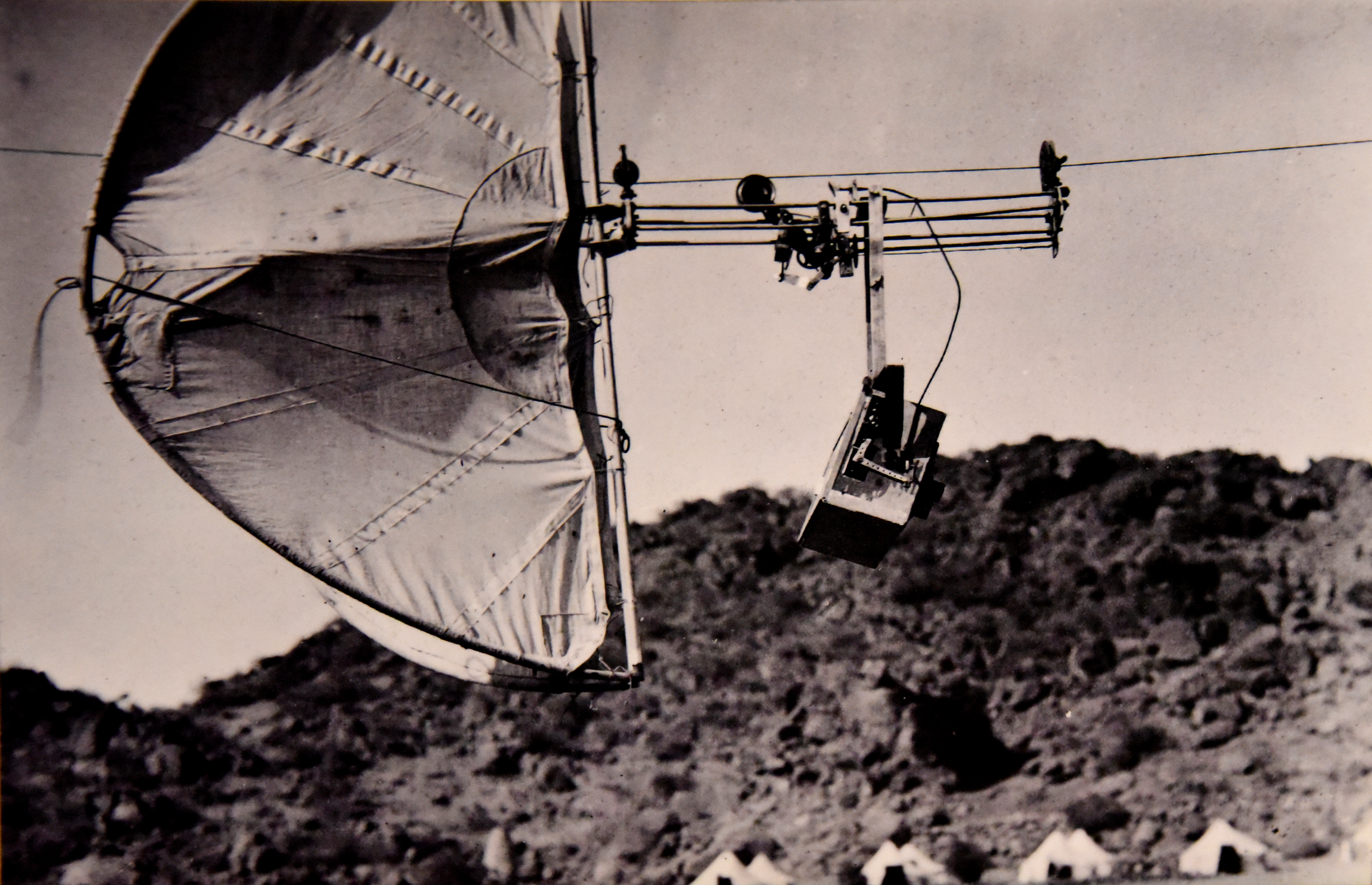
Photographic kite trolley aerial camera, 1912/13, unknown photographer

In 1912–1913, new photographic technology in Sudan was used for aerial photography in archaeology, when British entrepreneur and amateur archaeologist Sir Henry Wellcome applied his automatic kite trolley aerial camera device during excavations at Jebel Moya, which was documented by several other photographs on this archaeological campaign. (Note: The 1905 book by John Ward, Our Sudan - its pyramids and progress. J. Murrey, 1905 presents information and photographs on archaeological sites in Sudan around the turn of the century and before.)

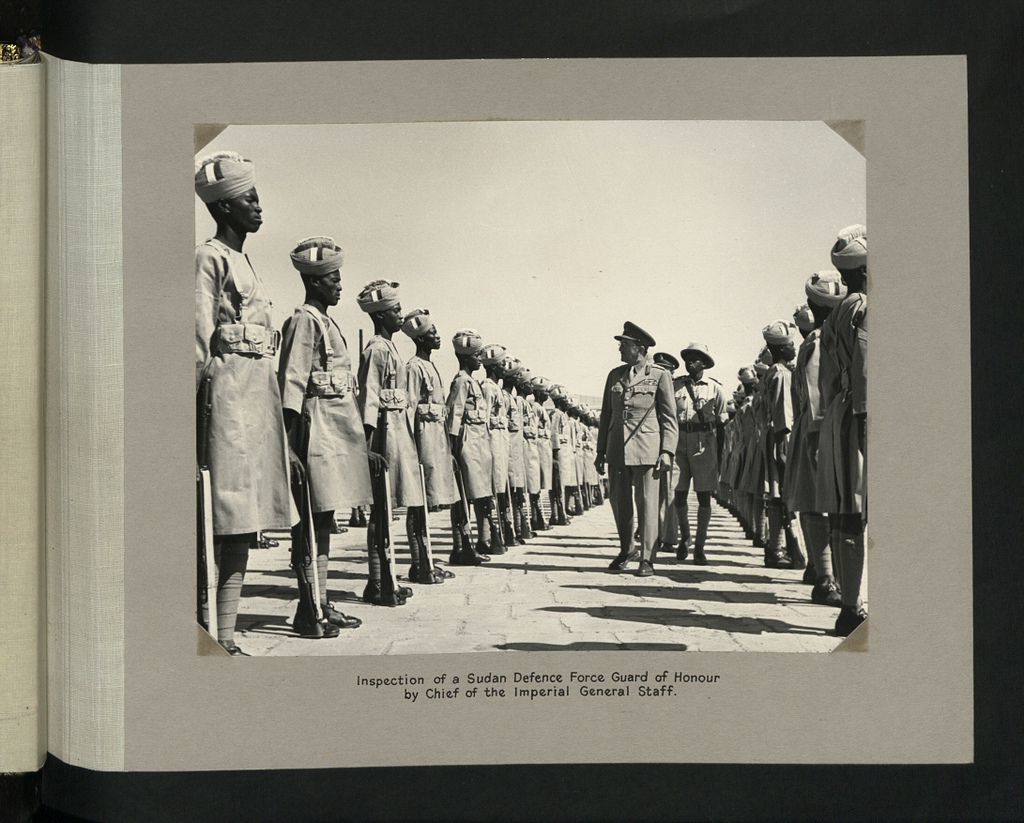
Inspection of SDF Guard of Honour

Between 1926 and 1936, the British anthropologist E.E. Evans-Pritchard took thousands of photographs during his anthropological fieldwork in southern Sudan. About 2500 of his images, mainly showing the life of the Azande, Moro, Ingessana, Nuer and Bongo peoples are in the collection of the Pitt Rivers Museum, with many of them published online.

Documenting the military activities of the Anglo-Egyptian condominium, photographs of soldiers and other military scenes, like the inspection of the Sudan Defense Force Guard of Honour, were taken during 1925 and 1955 and later collected in archives in the United Kingdom.

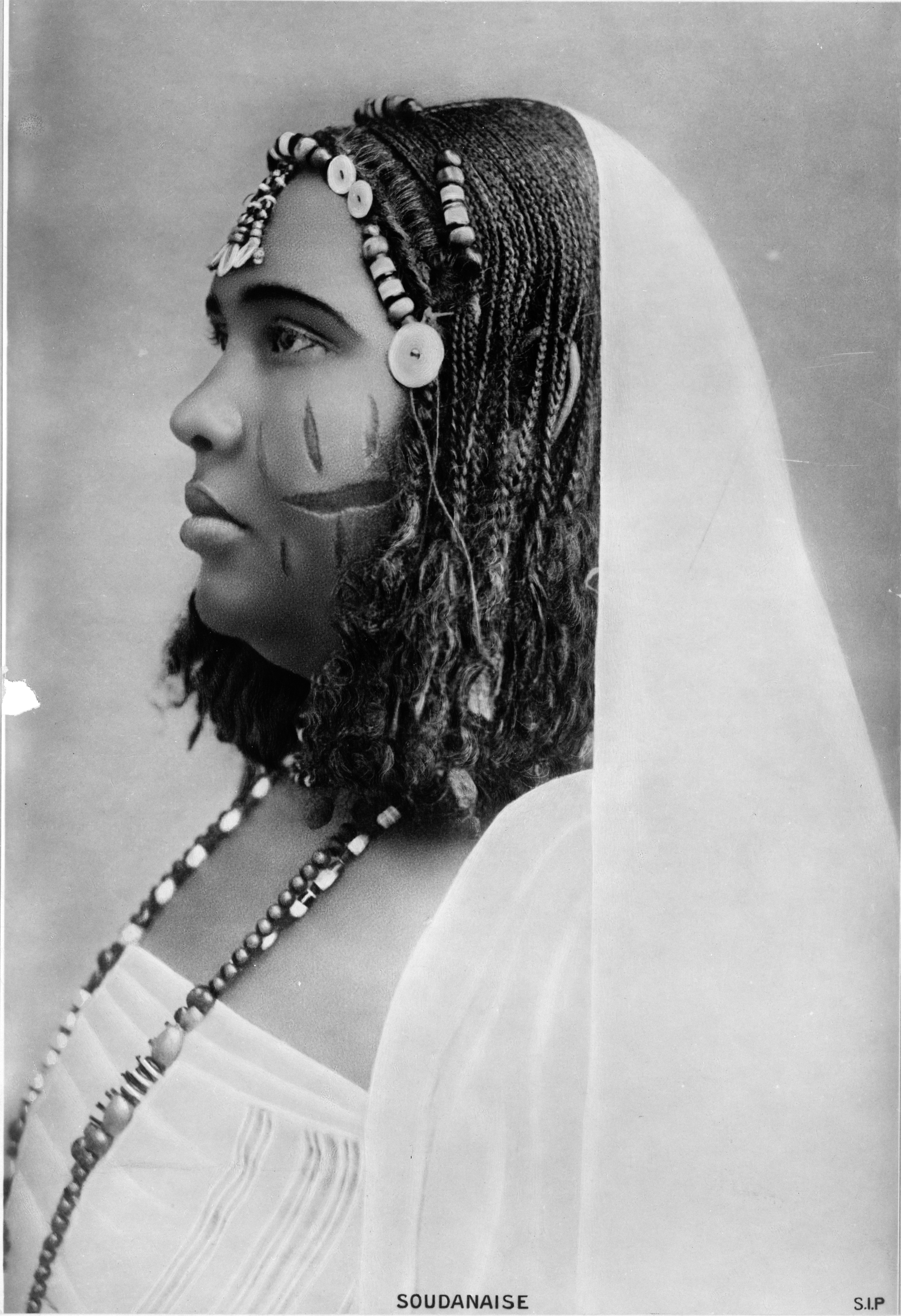
Sudanese woman with scarifications, unknown photographer, between 1890 and 1923

A critical appreciation of these early non-Sudanese photographers and their interest in exotic images of Sudan is expressed in the following quote by Danish researcher Elsa Yvanez:

In Sudan, many photographs have been produced by British citizens posted in Khartoum and elsewhere during the Anglo-Egyptian condominium (1899–1956). As thousands of other Europeans through the colonial empires, the British directed their cameras to the "typical scenes" of Sudanese life: open-air markets, views of the Nile, fishing scenes, wild and natural landscapes and, above all else, the Sudanese people themselves. Many of these photographs where then edited as postcards (notably by the Gordon Stationery and Bookstores in Khartoum). Circulating through the colonies, Europe, and America, these pictures form an evocative, exotic and fascinating portrait of the Sudanese people.

— Elsa Yvanez, Sudanese Clothing through the Modern Lens

=== Hugo Bernatzik's ethnographic photographs and book ===
In 1927, Austrian photographer and travel writer Hugo Bernatzik travelled by boat and his own automobile to southern Sudan. He returned with 1,400 photographs and 30,000 ft. of cinema film and published his impressions and ethnographic pictures of Shilluk, Nuer and Nuba people in 1930 in a popular travelogue, first in German and later in English titled Gari Gari: The Call of the African Wilderness (1936). Thus, exotic images and descriptions of ethnic life in remote areas of southern Sudan became known to European audiences and were later followed by photo stories by George Rodger and Leni Riefenstahl.

=== George Rodger's photographs of the Nuba and Latuka ===
A professional photojournalist, interested in traditional lifestyles in Africa, was George Rodger, a founding member of Magnum Photos. His photographs were taken in 1948 and 1949 of indigenous people of the Nuba mountains in the Sudanese province of Kordofan as well as of the Latuka and other peoples of southern Sudan. In the introduction to the book Nuba and Latuka. The colour photographs, they were called "some of the most historically important and influential images taken in sub-Saharan Africa during the twentieth century." As Rodger wrote several years later, "When we came to leave the Nuba Jebels (mountains), we took with us only memories of a people ... so much more hospitable, chivalrous and gracious than many of us who live in the 'Dark Continents' outside Africa." In 1951, Rodger published his photo essay of this journey in National Geographic. In the 1960s, his pictures prompted controversial German photographer and filmmaker Leni Riefenstahl to travel to the Nuba mountains for her own photo stories on the Nuba people.

=== The first Sudanese photographers ===
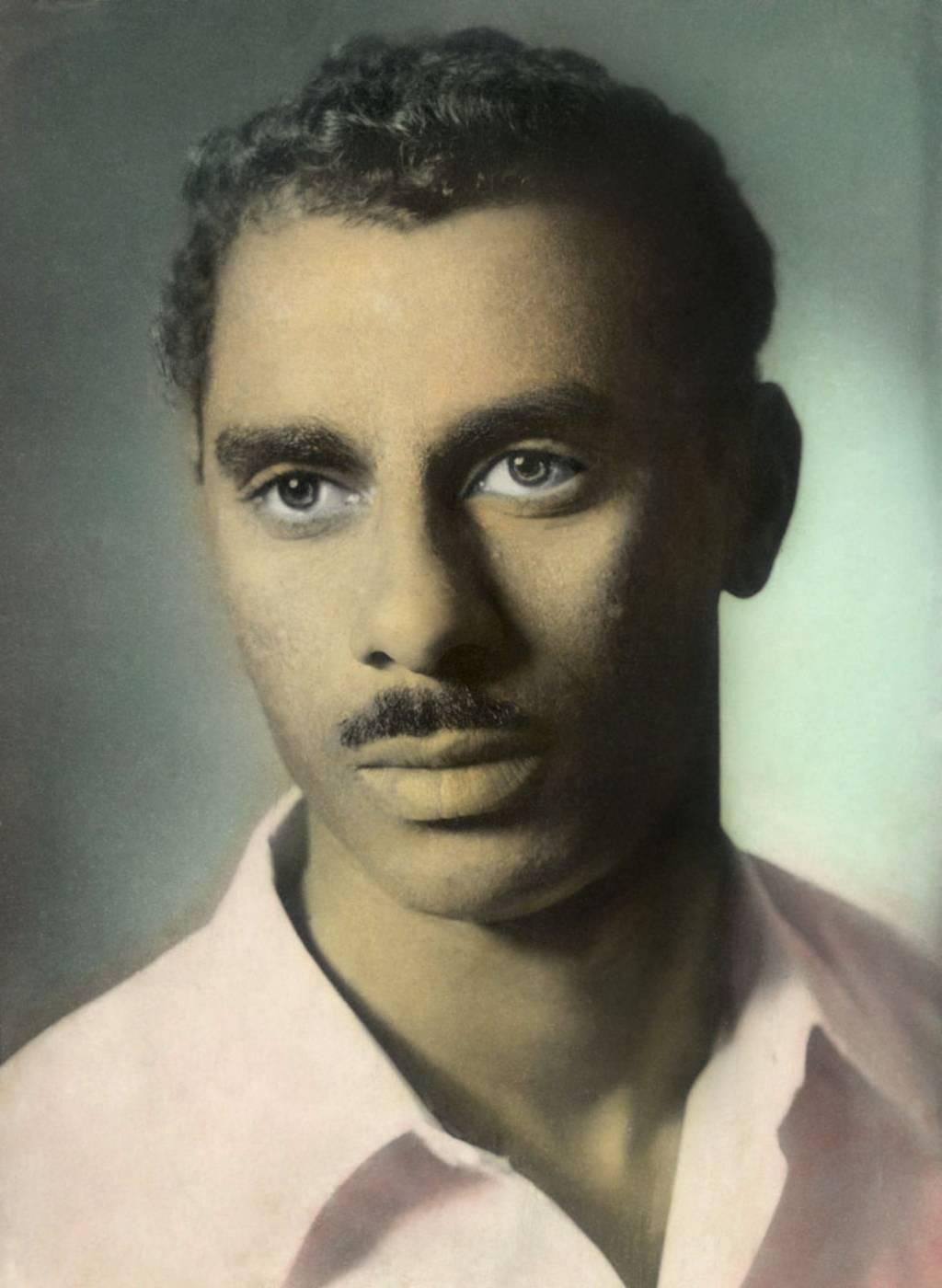
Portrait of a man by Rashid Mahdi

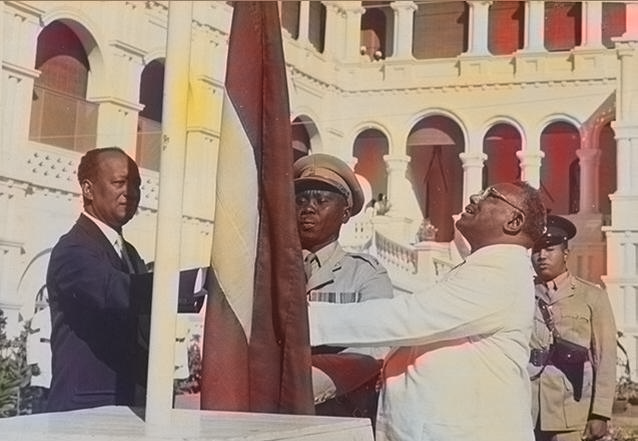
Sudan's flag raised at its independence ceremony, on 1 January 1956, photo by Gadalla Gubara

As far as has been documented, one of the first professional Sudanese photographers and film cameramen was Gadalla Gubara, a pioneer of cinema in Sudan and Africa at large. During and after the Second World War, he filmed and photographed many current events, one of them being the raising of the Sudanese flag on the Day of Independence. (Note: Omar Zaki wrote in his article Sudan: Gadalla Gubara - a Forgotten Filmmaking Legend: "Gubara and fellow scriptwriter Kamal Ibrahim, were the only cameramen to record Sudan's Independence on January 1st 1956. He captured the symbolic moments when democratically elected Prime Minister Ismail Al-Azhari walked from the parliament to the presidential palace and replaced the British and Egyptian flags with the blue, gold, and green flag of Sudan." - See Zaki, Omar (14 September 2012). "Sudan: Gadalla Gubara - a forgotten filmmaking legend". All Africa.) Another early Sudanese photographer was the self-taught photographer Rashid Mahdi. (Note: In an article about the exhibition "The Khartoum School: the making of the modern art movement in Sudan (1945–present)" in Sharja, UAE, 2017, the author writes about photography in Sudan: "The exhibition highlights the work of two pioneer master-photographers, Rashid Mahdi and Gadalla Gubara, as well as other studio photographers, for example, Abbas Habib Alla, Mohamed Yahya Issa, Fouad Hamza Tibin, Osman Hamid Khalifa, Omar Addow, Richard Lokiden Wani and Joua, in the context of the historical linkages between photography, decolonisation and self-representation." Source: "The Khartoum School: the making of the modern art movement in Sudan (1945–present)". Sharjah Art Foundation. Archived from the original on 28 October 2022.) The French photographer Claude Iverné, who also created his own photo stories in Sudan, called Rashid Mahdi "certainly the most sophisticated and one of the major African photographers of the XXth century". On his webpage, which claims to present a collection of about 12.000 digitized images from 1890 up to 2015, Iverné has published many photographs by Rashid Mahdi, both in Inverné's own collection, as well as in the Musée du quai Branly in Paris.

Commenting on the important change of representation in photographs of Africans in cities during the 1930s, the authors of the article An outline history of photography in Africa to ca. 1940, David Killingray and Andrew Roberts, have called this change "a shift to pictures of people, not 'natives'".

== Post-independence (1956–2010) ==
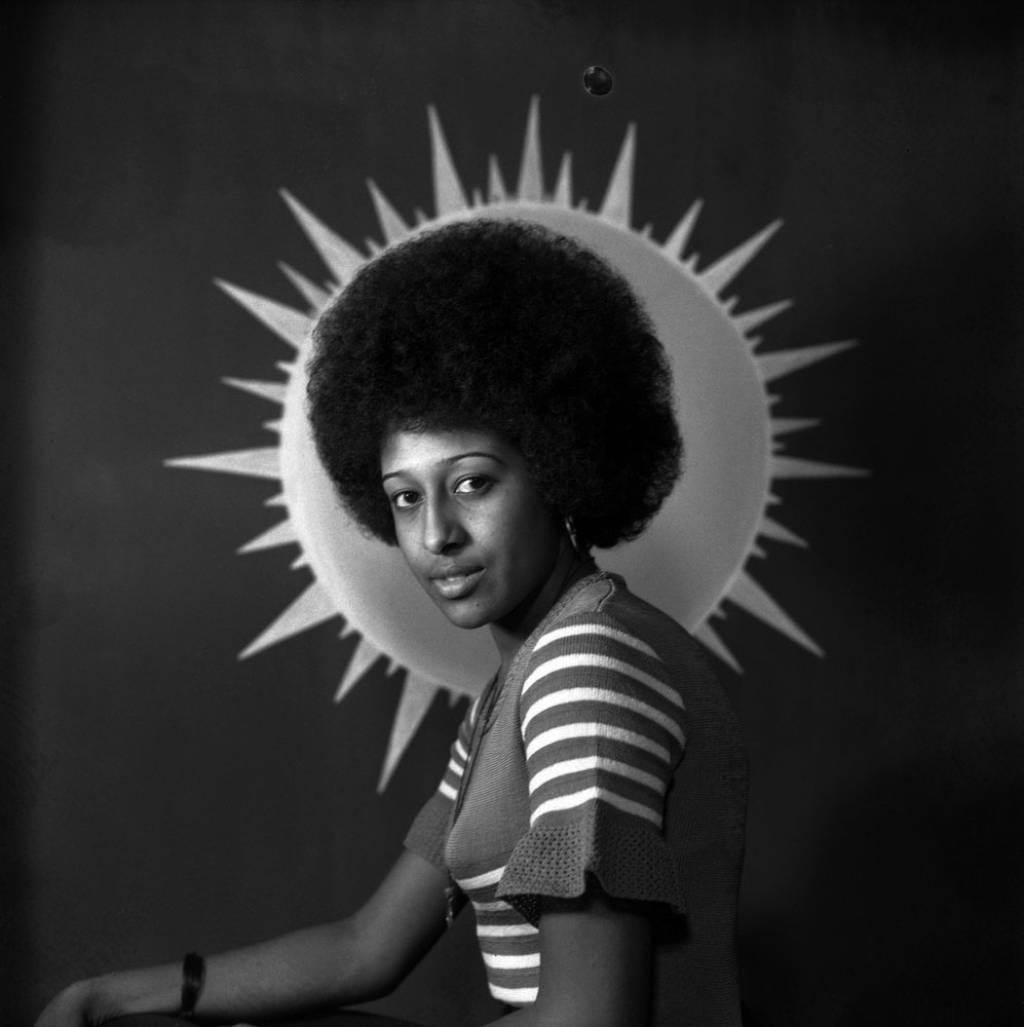
Photograph of a young Sudanese woman in the 1970s by Fouad Hamza Tibin

=== The Golden Years of photography (1950s–1980s) ===
The years before Sudan's independence in 1956 and up to the 1980s have been described as a prolific period for cultural life in Sudan, "including literature, music, and theatre to visual and performing arts". Many Sudanese photographers of this important era are presented with a short biography and pictures on the website of the French photo archive Elnour. The photographers described include Rashid Mahdi, Abbas Habiballah, Fouad Hamza Tibin, Mohamed Yahia Issa and others. In an interview about his research in Sudan, Claude Inverné talked about this era of photography in Sudan. Photographs by Gadalla Gubara and Rashid Mahdi were included in the exhibition at the Sharjah Art Foundation titled "The making of the modern art movement in Sudan" in 2017.

At the 6th African Photography Encounters held in Bamako in 2005, Sudan gained international recognition, when it was featured with a number of photographers active from 1935 to 2002.

=== Riefenstahl's photo books on the Nuba peoples ===
Cover of The People of Kau, by Leni Riefenstahl, 1974

Riefenstahl travelled to the Nuba mountains in the 1960s and 1970s when she was over 60. On her return she published her colour images of Nuba people in traditional settings in two books titled Die Nuba (The Last of the Nuba) and Die Nuba von Kau (The People of Kau). For some of her photographs and film scenes, she relied on Sudanese cameraman Gadalla Gubara, who accompanied her to the Nuba mountains. Both photo books became international bestsellers and attracted much attention to the archaic lifestyle of these ethnic groups.

A critical reaction to Riefenstahl's photography of the Nuba came from the American writer Susan Sontag. Based on Riefenstahl's fascination with strong, healthy bodies and her 1930s propaganda films for the government of Nazi Germany, Sontag scrutinized the "fascist aesthetics" of these photo books in her essay 'Fascinating fascism'. Writing in the New York Review of Books in 1975, she stated: "The fascist dramaturgy centers on the orgiastic transactions between mighty forces and their puppets." This kind of criticism of the foreigner's view and interpretation of archaic African lifestyles was further elaborated in her collection of essays On Photography, where Sontag argues that the proliferation of photographic images had begun to establish a "chronic voyeuristic relation" of the viewers to the subjects portrayed. Further, the German media critic Rainer Rother wrote "Riefenstahl viewed [the Nuba] as potential models and scanned the world before her eyes for spectacular images. Photography became something intrusive, a form of hunting."

=== Travel photography and photojournalism ===
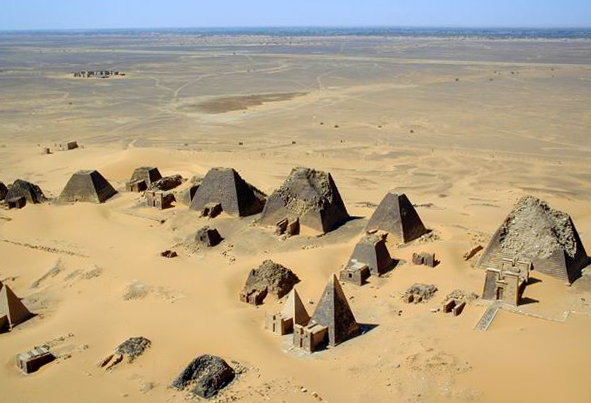
Aerial view of the Nubian pyramids at Meroe, by B. N. Chagny, 2001

With the rise of colour photography, coffee table books and magazines specialising on lavish photo essays and international tourism, various styles of documentary photography evolved. In Sudan, this includes photo stories about its historic heritage, such as the Nubian pyramids. The growing concerns of social repercussions of travel photography apply to professionals as well as to tourists and their private, amateur photography. Culturally inappropriate behaviour of tourists has raised criticism with respect to taking photographs in non-Western countries, and of creating "exotic visions" of foreign cultures. Sudan being one of the less visited, but more "exotic" destinations, is no exception to this.

After having documented the culture of the Dinka people in South Sudan since the 1970s, American photographers Carol Beckwith and Angela Fisher have earned renown for their aesthetically crafted images of the Dinka's ancient ways of cattle raising. Their photo essay is presented online on Google Arts & Culture. Similar images form part of Brazilian photographer Sebastião Salgado's work depicting archaic lifestyles in Eastern Africa. In 2008, Australian photographer Jack Picone's published a book of photographs about his trip to the Nuba mountains, with text provided by anthropologist John Ryle.

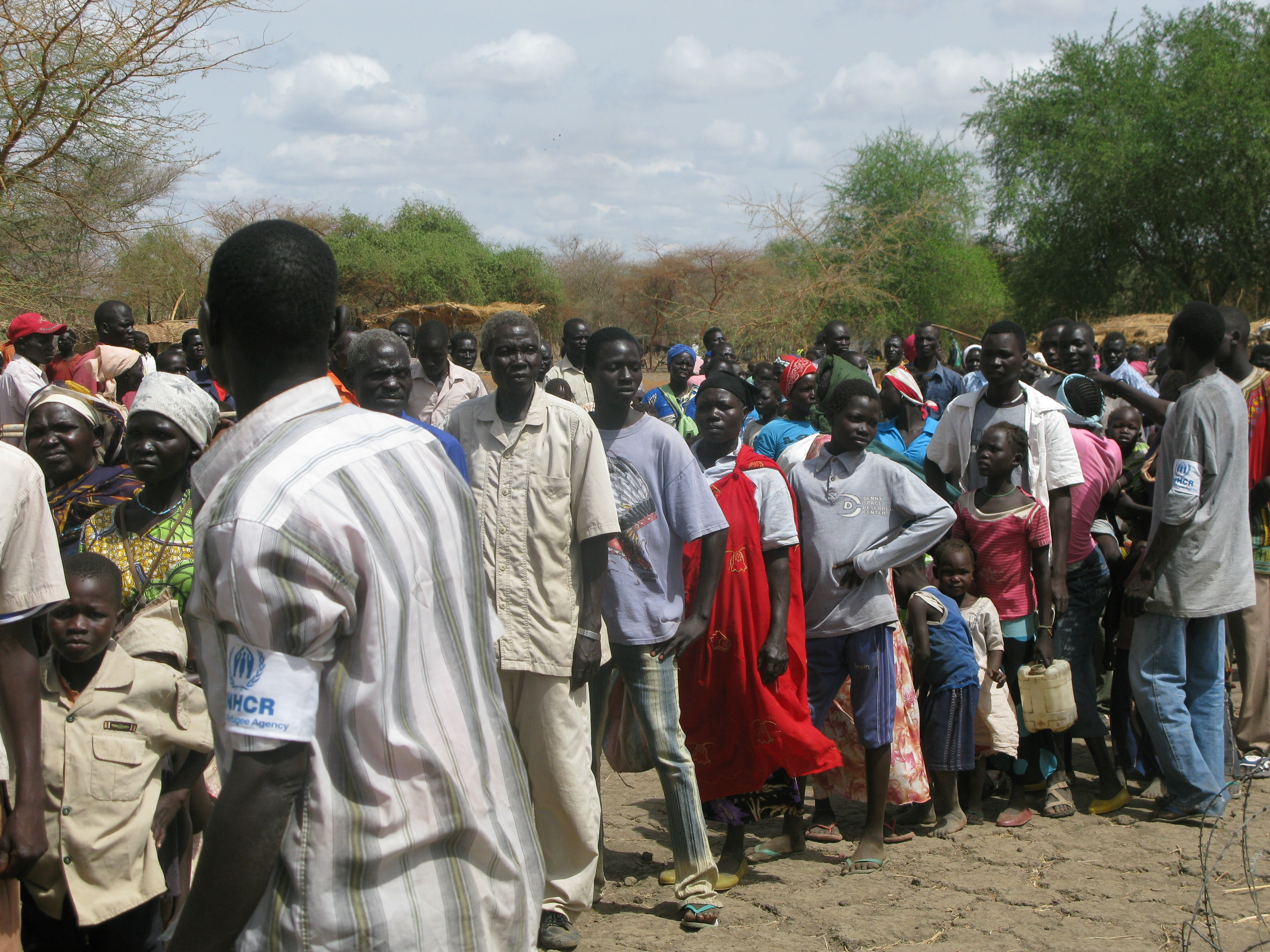
UNHCR helping refugees in South Sudan, unknown photographer, 2012

As Sudanese have suffered from forced displacement, civil war or human trafficking, humanitarian crises have also been covered by photo journalists. UNMIS, the United Nations Mission in Sudan for Peacekeeping, WHO and UNICEF, usually employ their own professional photographers. Sudanese self-trained photographers like Sari Omer have also been employed for this kind of documentary photography, using their cultural knowledge of the populations concerned.

In 1993, a shocking picture of a child, lying lifeless on the ground, and observed by a vulture sitting nearby, was published worldwide as a reminder of the human catastrophe in southern Sudan. The photographer Kevin Carter, a South African photojournalist, became known for the picture The Vulture and the Little Girl. Carter later said that he was shocked by the situation he had just photographed, and had chased the vulture away. (Note: Before taking his plane, Carter told Silva: "You won't believe what I've just shot! … I was shooting this kid on her knees, and then changed my angle, and suddenly there was this vulture right behind her! … And I just kept shooting – shot lots of film!" Then Carter told him that he had chased the vulture away. He told Silva he was shocked by the situation he had just photographed, saying, "I see all this, and all I can think of is Megan", his young daughter. A few minutes later, they left Ayod for Kongor. - In 2011, the child's father revealed that the child was actually a boy, called Kong Nyong, and had been taken care of by the UN food aid station. Source: Rojas, Alberto (21 February 2011). "Kong Nyong, el niño que sobrevivió al buitre = Kong Nyong, The boy who survived the vulture". El Mundo (in Spanish). Archived from the original on 30 June 2017.) The following year, Carter won the Pulitzer Prize for Feature Photography for this picture, which had raised concerns about the ethical behaviour of the photographer, who had not tried to help the child. (Note: Claiming responsible ethical behaviour of photographers, publishers and the viewers of such photographs of shocking scenes, cultural writer Susan Sontag wrote in her essay Regarding the pain of others (2003): "There is shame as well as shock in looking at the close-up of a real horror. Perhaps the only people with the right to look at images of suffering of this extreme order are those who could do something to alleviate it … or those who could learn from it. The rest of us are voyeurs, whether or not we mean to be." Source: Susan Sontag, Regarding the Pain of Others. New York: Picador/Farrar, Straus and Giroux, 2003)

== The 2010s and beyond ==
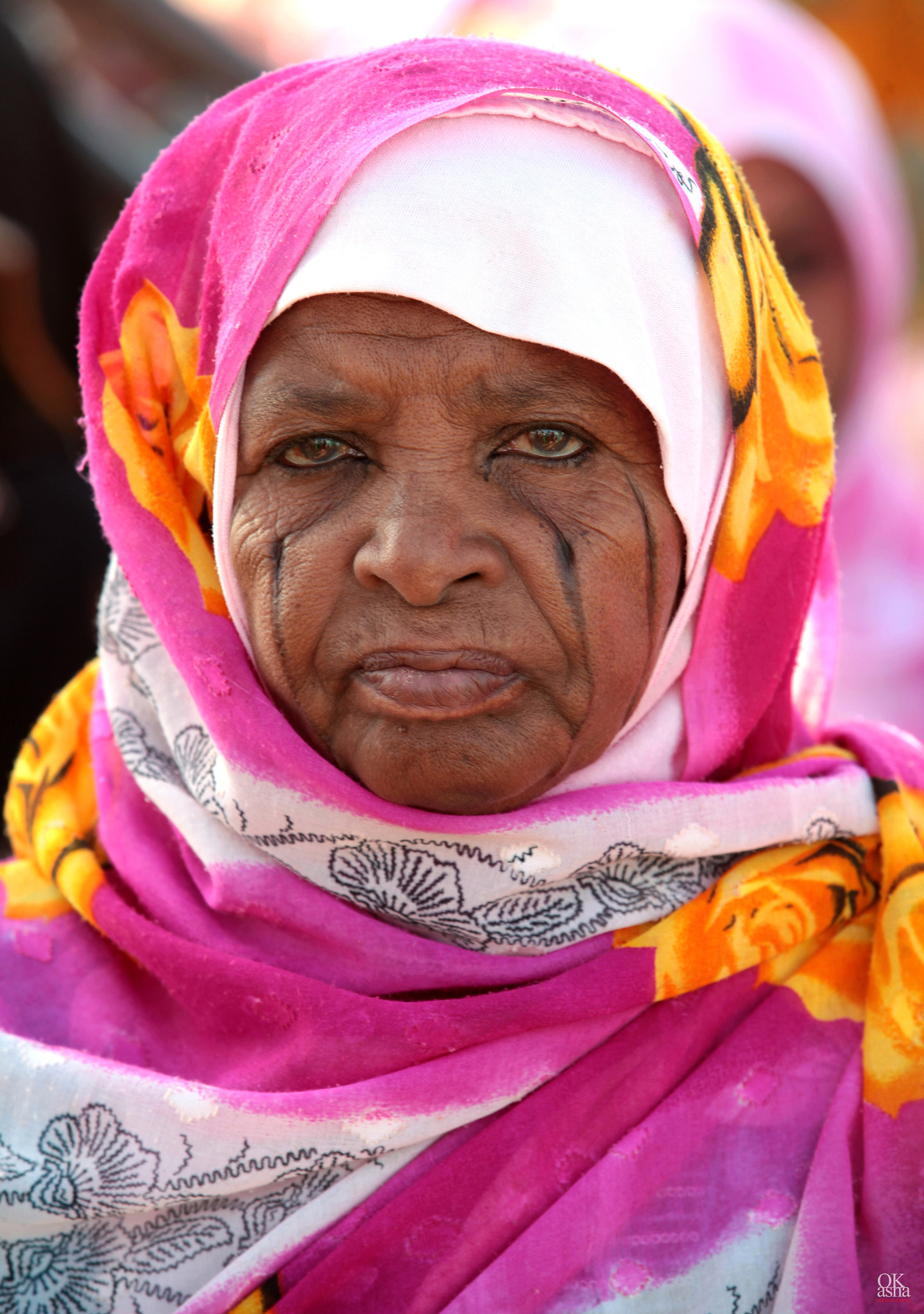
Sudanese woman with scarifications, by Sudanese photographer Okasha, 2013

=== Digital photography ===
Even though there are no institutions for teaching photography in Sudan, the new technical possibilities of digital photography, image editing and using the Internet for learning about how to take photographs have made it possible for a growing number of Sudanese to train themselves in photography. The spread of affordable mobile phones and Internet tariffs have led mostly younger Sudanese to start experimenting with digital cameras or mobile photography and to share their pictures or videos on social media.

In 2009, an informal group of aspiring photographers created the Sudanese Photographers Group on Facebook. The idea for this group was to have an easily accessible, virtual place for all interested photographers to meet and share ideas. In 2012, they decided to focus more seriously on the art of photography and found a partner for setting up workshop sessions in the German cultural centre in Khartoum. These workshops were conducted by professional photographers, invited from Germany, South Africa or Nigeria and repeated from 2012 to 2017, with assignments and meetings of the photographers in between the workshops. From this training, several photo exhibitions called Mugran Foto Week were organized. Some of the photographers have been invited to international exhibitions such as the African Photography Encounters in Bamako or have received grants to study abroad. Sudanese photographers like Ala Kheir have also been involved with the Centers of Learning for Photography in Africa (CLPA), an independent network whose aim is to facilitate exchange between photographers of curriculum development and teaching methods.

=== Commercial challenges and political expression ===
Kandake of the Sudanese Revolution by Lana H. Haroun was the image that went viral as a symbol of the 2018–19 Sudanese revolution.

A limiting factor for professional photographers before the civil war that started in 2023 was the low demand for commercial photography. Companies using professional photographs of Sudanese settings were DAL Group, that promotes Sudanese food products and local traditions, as well as Internet service providers such as MTN or Zain. Despite such constraints, Sudanese freelance photographers experimented with street photography and fine-art photography.

After the Sudanese revolution of 2018/19, new chances for artistic expression, public action or citizens' involvement in society opened up. (Note: Ala Kheir, one of the founders of the Sudanese Photographers Group, describes the difficult situation for photographers before the Sudanese revolution like this: "I think in the beginning of the 1990s, a lot of photojournalists took photos of what was happening in the country. The government reacted against those images that they did not want to be shown in the media. That is how the phobia started. This fear is still here, especially after the Arab Spring, as the regime saw what happened in other countries. When we go on a trip to take photographs, it is very common for us to be arrested and taken to the police station. It is not dangerous, but you lose time, they interrogate you. So they make sure you won't be motivated to go out and take photographs.") An example of photography used to illustrate political participation in Sudan was the smartphone image of the Kandake of the Sudanese Revolution, of the student Alaa Salah, taken by amateur photographer Lana Haroun during the 2019 protests. Another well-known image of these protests is a photograph by Japanese photographer Yasuyoshi Chiba of Agence France-Presse, showing a young man in Khartoum reciting protest poetry, while demonstrators chant slogans calling for civilian rule, that was selected as World Press Photo of the Year 2020. In 2022, an image by Sudanese photographer Faiz Abubakr Mohamed of a woman protestor hurling a teargas canister back at riot police during pro-democracy protests in Sudan in 2021 was awarded first prize in the "Singles Category for Africa" of the World Press Photo contest. In 2022, Ammar Abdallah Osman won the First Place of the East African Photography Awards in the Human Singles category for his portrait Man with Nobody. In the 2025 World Press Africa photo contest, Mosab Abushama was distinguished for his story "Life won't stop".

=== Contemporary photographers ===
Contemporary Sudanese photographers of the 2010s and beyond include professional photojournalists Mohamed Nureldin Abdallah, who covered Sudan for Reuters for more than 15 years before the civil war and is also known for his creative fine-art photography, and Ashraf Shazly, who worked for AFP/Getty Images in Khartoum before the 2023 war.

Other photographers, mainly active in non-commercial photojournalism, such as street photography or documenting cultural life through fashion or other lifestyles, are women photographers Salma Alnour, Ola Alsheikh, Suha Barakat, Eythar Gubara, Metche Jaafar, Duha Mohammed or Soleyma Osman, as well as their male colleagues Ahmad Abushakeema, Mohamed Altoum, Salih Basheer, Nagi Elhussain, Hisham Karouri, Ala Kheir, Sharaf Mahzoub, Sari Omer, Atif Saad, Muhammad Salah, or Wael Al Sanosi aka Wellyce. (Note: This list is by no means complete, but wants to name some of the most active and visible Sudanese photographers of today. Pictures of most of them can be found on Instagram.) Most of them are members of the Sudanese Photographers Group, and have been part of Sudan's upcoming generation of photographers since the 2010s.

In 2021, the French book Soudan 2019, année zéro presented a detailed historical and sociological documentation and analysis of the weeks during the Sudanese revolution that preceded the deadly assault and destruction of the site that protestors had occupied in front of the headquarters of the Armed Forces in central Khartoum. Part of this documentation of the Khartoum massacre are numerous pictures by Sudanese photographers who had documented the uprising until that point in time.

From July to September 2021, the international photography festival Rencontres de la photographie at Arles in southern France announced an exhibition on the Sudanese revolution under the title 'Thawra! ثورة Revolution!'. It presented images by some of the Sudanese photographers who contributed to the book Soudan 2019, année zéro. During this festival, Eythar Gubara won the photography award (Prix de la photo Madame Figaro - Arles) for her photo story "Nothing can stop the Kandakas" (title of the queens in ancient Nubia), sponsored by French women's magazine Madame Figaro. This award entailed a fashion photo editorial by Gubara, published in the magazine's July 2022 edition.

In his December 2023 illustrated essay titled "Between Wakefulness and Dreams in Sudan", Sudanese art curator Rahiem Shadad wrote about the artistic photographic work of photographer Hassan Kamil, who was born and brought up in the northern town of Berber. According to Shadad, a significant part of Kamil's work is dedicated to exploring the town's neglect, while also highlighting its often overlooked beauty and richness. Shadad interpreted the images in the context of the country's economic and social disparities, displacement by the civil war that started in 2023, and the previous decades of Islamist rule under Omar al-Bashir.

During exile in the 2020s, photographers Mosab Abushama and Hashim Nasr became known for their personal depictions of the destruction and human suffering in their home country. Abushama was awarded a prize at the 2025 World Press Photo contest for his image of a bridegroom with a rifle titled "Life won't stop". Along with other Sudanese photographers, Nasr won an East African Photography award, and he was mentioned in the British Journal of Photography’s “ones to watch” issue in 2024.

As a literary reflection about documentary photography of political events, South Sudanese writer Stella Gaitano described the intentions of a fictional photographer taking pictures during the 2019 Sudanese revolution:

He was simply doing what he knew how to do well, for the good of the revolution: taking pictures from various locations, photos that inspired enthusiasm, like the picture of that revolutionary woman who picked up a tear-gas grenade and put it back in its launcher. Photos that provoked anger, like the one of several masked agents whipping a child. Photos that triggered both pain and anger, like the one of a martyr falling, covered in blood. Photos that caused disgust, like the one of security personnel raiding homes – utterly disrespecting the people's sanctuaries – to look for revolutionaries. Photos that brought smiles, like that of a little girl carried on someone's shoulders, yelling "Down with the regime of killers!"

— Stella Gaitano, The Rally of the Sixth of April

Photography in the 21st century

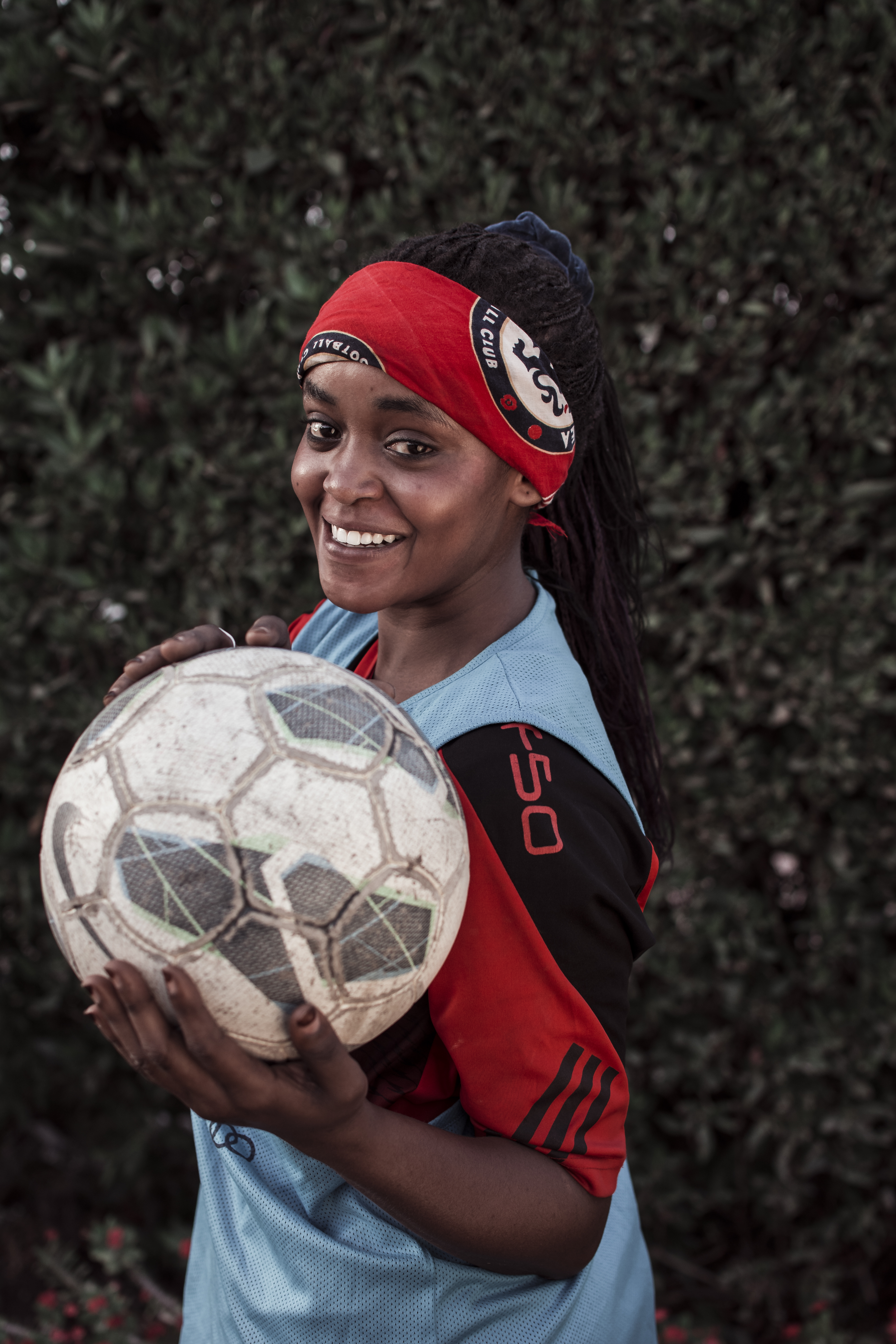
The Challenge soccer team, by Metche Jaafar

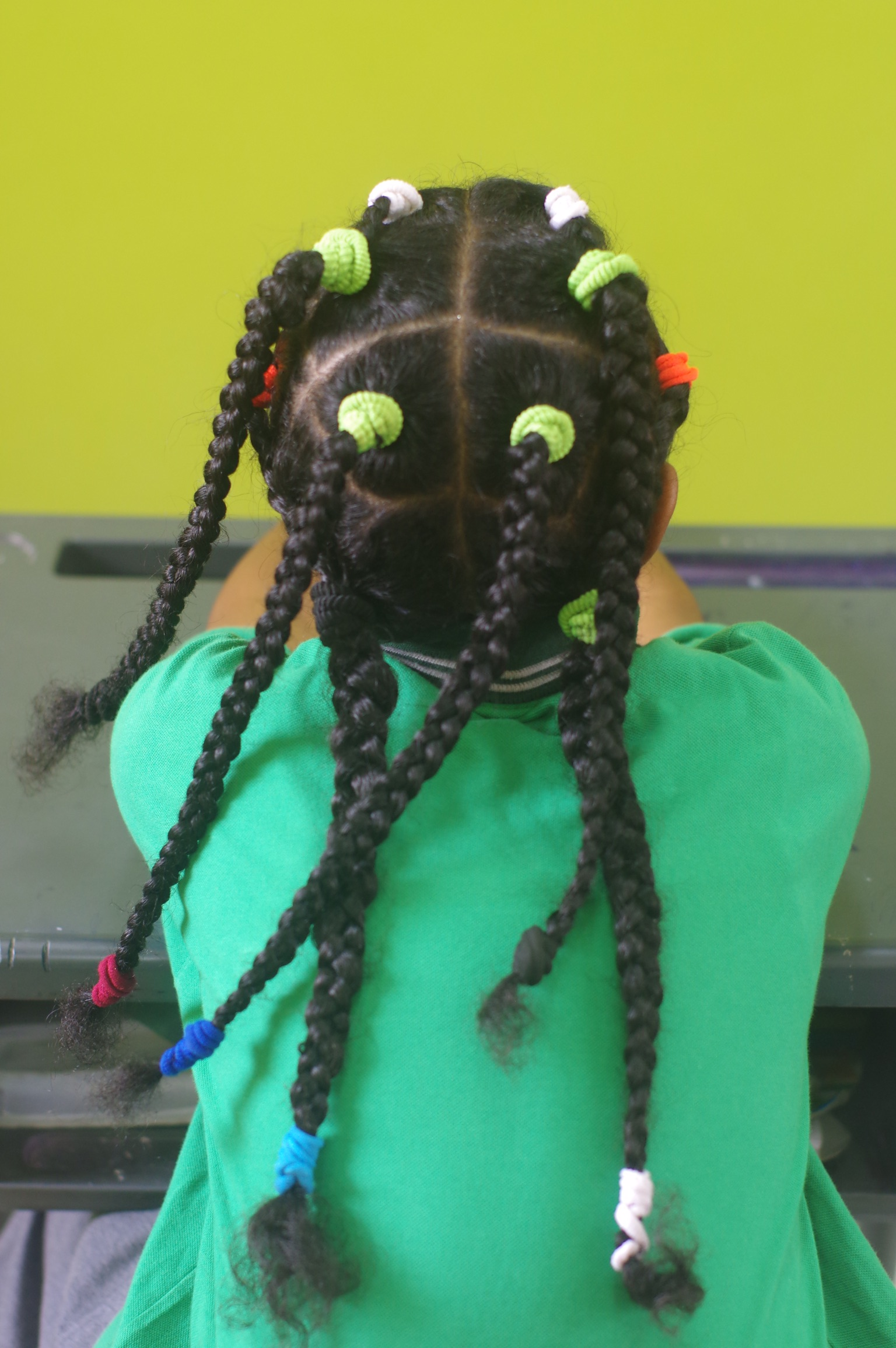
Modern schools in Sudan, by Ola Alsheikh

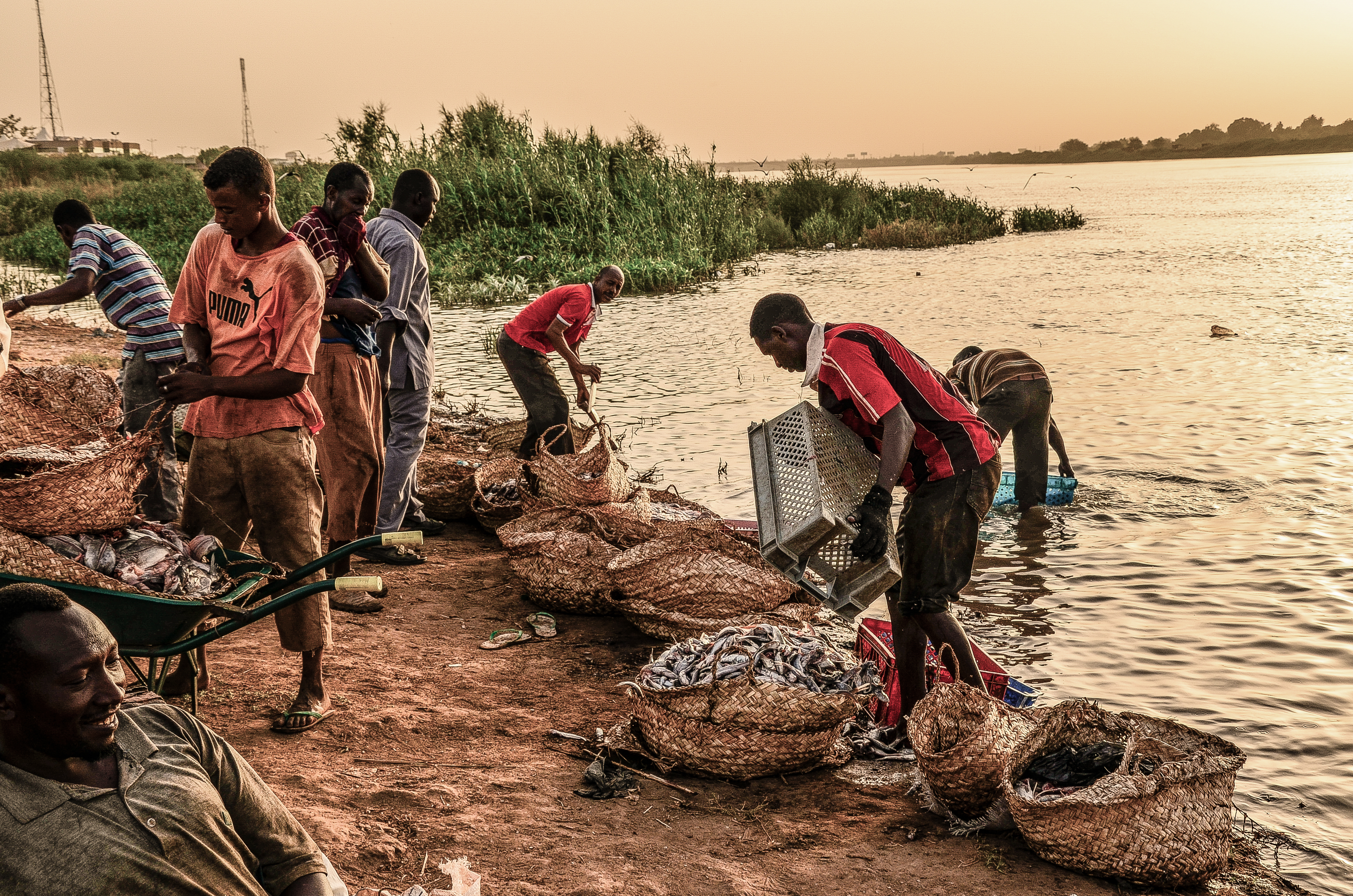
Fishing on the river Nile, by Eythar Gubara

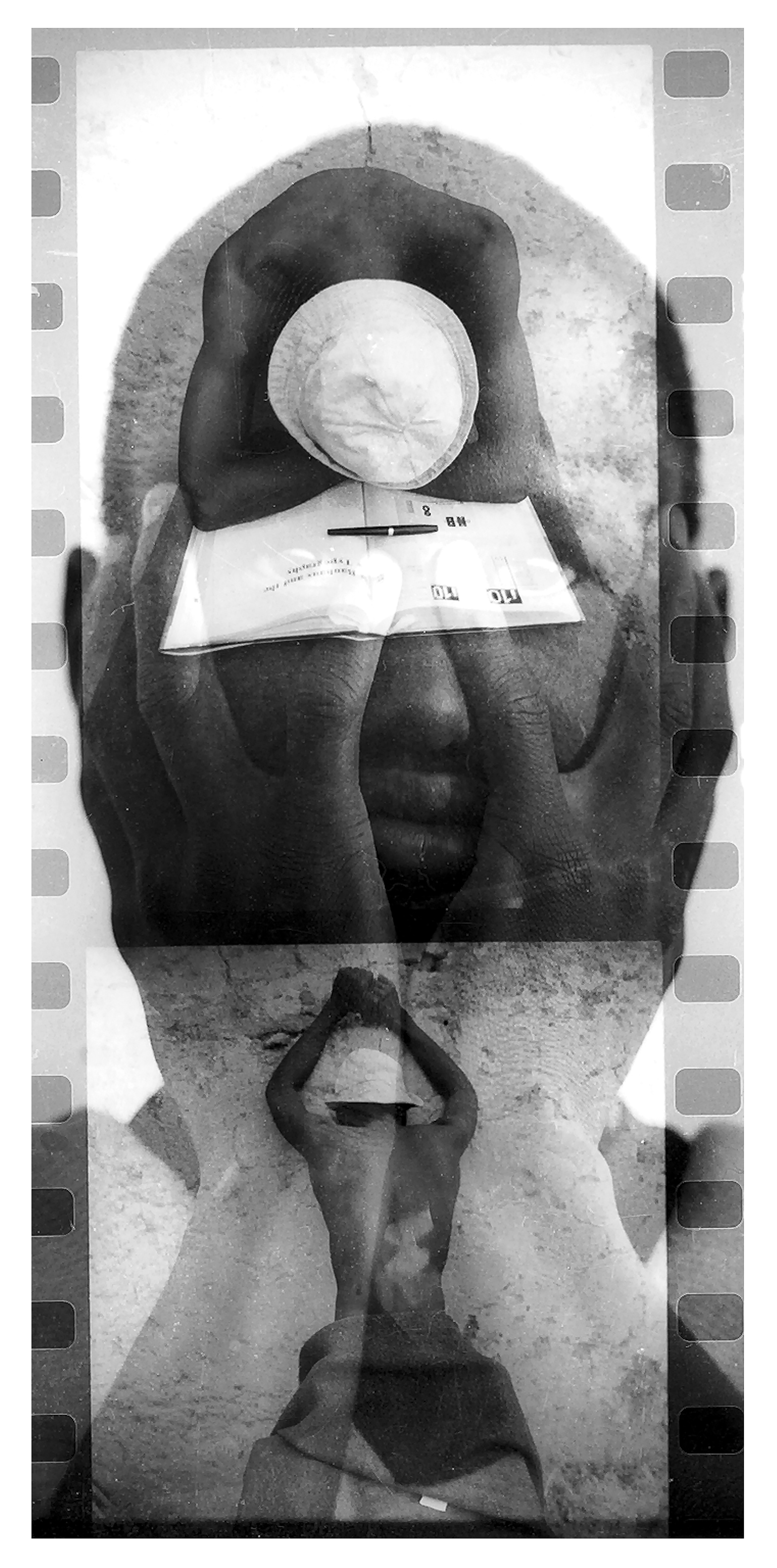
Man of the modern world by M. Nureldin Abdallah

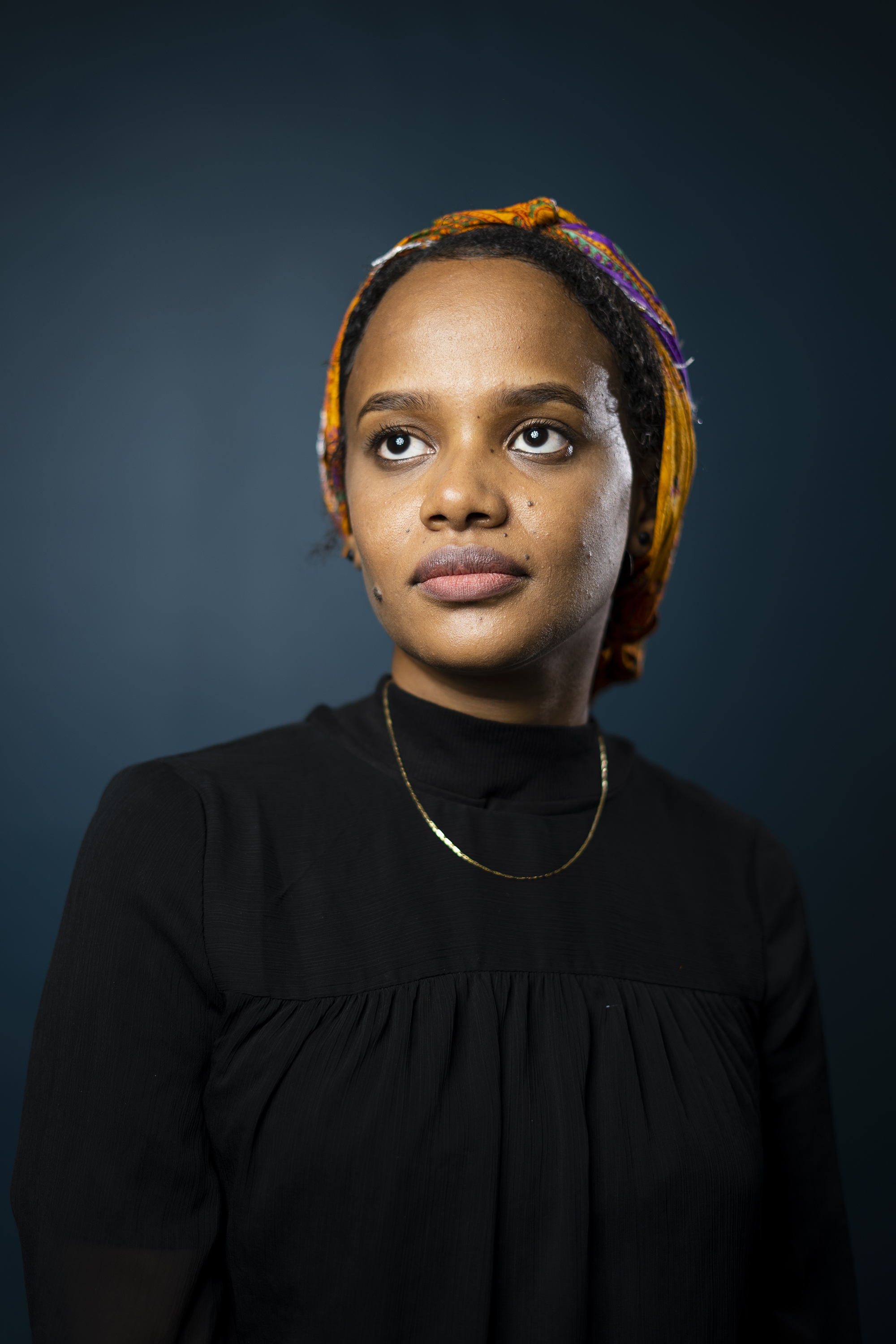
Portrait of Amna Elhassan by Ala Kheir

=== 2023 Postcards from Khartoum ===
Following the 2023 armed conflict in Sudan, Ala Kheir, Ola Alsheikh and other Sudanese photographers started the online project Postcards from Khartoum. Amidst the destruction of their cities, thousands of people fleeing the fighting and shortages of food, water and electricity, they have been publishing their pictures and brief commentaries as "an insight to what is going on in their lives since the 16th of April 2023."

== Collections and online archives ==
Starting in 2018, the online archive and cultural heritage project Sudan Memory has been conserving and promoting Sudanese cultural heritage both physically in the country itself, as well as since April 2022 through the Internet. Among many other documents, the project's webpage offers access to numerous photographs documenting Sudan's political and cultural history as well as its natural and demographic diversity from the early 1900s to the present. The country's largest photographic archive, Rashid Mahdi's photo studio in Atbara is featured with hundreds of photographs documenting the region's private, public and economic history from the 1940s to 1990s. Gadalla Gubara (1920–2008), Sudan's internationally most well-known photographer and filmmaker, is shown working in his studio, and the street art of the 2019 Sudanese revolution is presented through more than 60 images.

Historical photographs of Sudan are also available online from a number of international collections, such as Durham University (photographs and documents), Pitt Rivers Museum, Oxford, (detailed catalogue of ethnographic photographs from southern Sudan), both of whom are also contributors to Sudan Memory. Further, the Museum of Ethnology in Vienna presents historical photographs by Richard Buchta, an Austrian explorer and early photographer.

In her essay "The Sudanese gaze: Visual memory in post-independence Sudan", Sudanese-American writer Dalia Elhassan discussed the complex relationships that historical photographs and films from Sudan play in constructing knowledge about this East African country. Accordingly, both for people like herself, who live in the Sudanese diaspora, as well as for Sudanese at home and of different generations, these images "captured by a Sudanese lens, a Sudanese gaze" relate directly to questions of cultural identity, blackness, history and their perceptions in Sudanese literature, visual arts and the media.

While the photographers themselves cannot live on, it is the stories, the visual memories safeguarded in their photographs that remain alive: a time in Sudan that, despite every effort being made to blur it from national consciousness, can sharpen into view upon a single glance of any photograph captured through the Sudanese gaze.

— Dalia Elhassan, The Sudanese gaze: Visual memory in post-independence Sudan

== See also ==
- Visual arts of Sudan
- Cinema of Sudan
