= Ola Alsheikh =

Sudanese photographer

Ola Alsheikh عُلا الشيخ
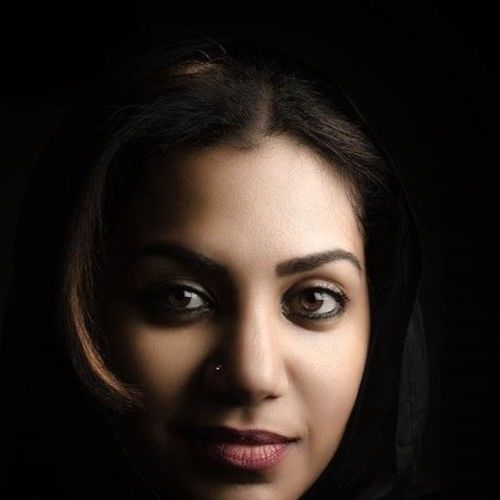
- Born: Omdurman, Sudan
- Known for: documentary photography Electrical Engineering
- Website: Personal website

Ola Alsheikh, also known as Ola Abbas Alsheikh Omer (Arabic: عُلا عباس الشيخ عمر; born in Omdurman, Sudan), is a Sudanese freelance documentary photographer. She is mainly known for her pictures of everyday life and social events in Khartoum. In her work, she has placed a special focus on images of women and girls, as well as on the social and ethnic diversity in Sudan.

== Life and career ==
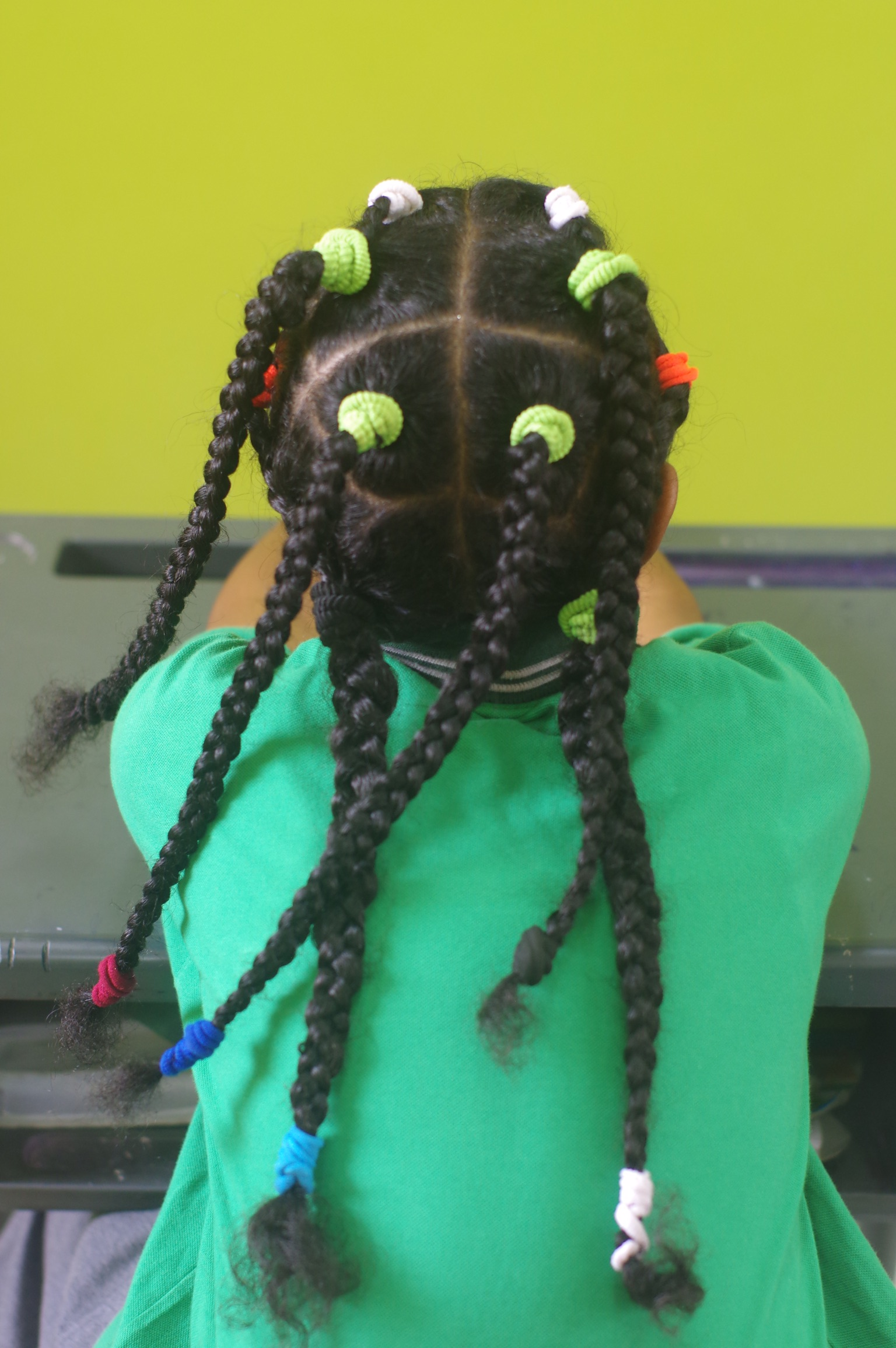
Schoolgirl in Omdurman, by Ola Alsheikh

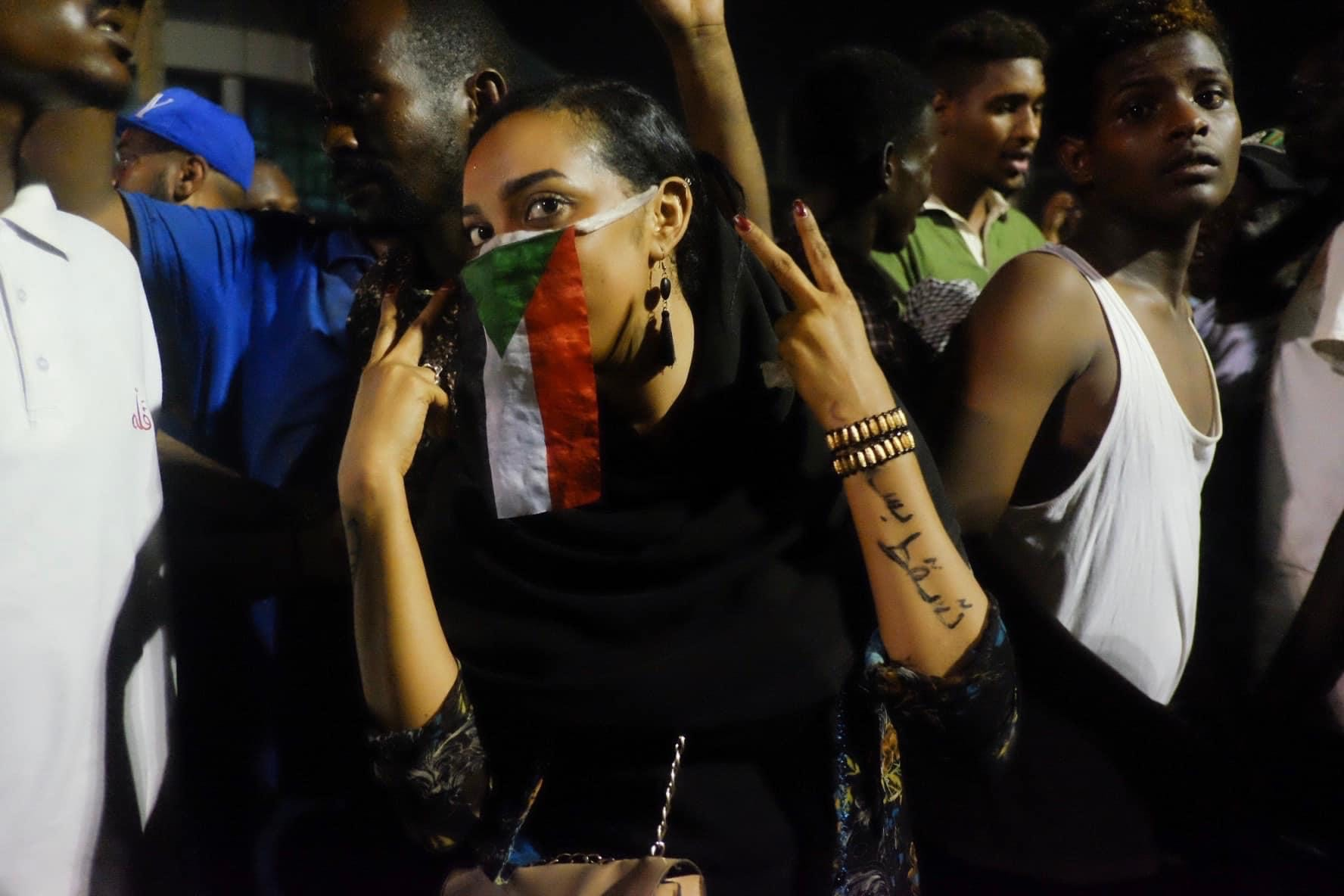
Sudanese women protesting in 2019, by Ola Alsheikh

Alsheikh was born in Omdurman, Sudan, and grew up in Germany, Saudi Arabia and Sudan. She holds a degree in Electrical Engineering from the University of Khartoum.

According to a report by BBC News, as a female photographer she has encountered mockery or even harassment, while taking photographs in the streets of Khartoum. She attributes this negative attitude to the fact that people in Khartoum are not used to seeing a woman with a camera in the streets. But despite this, she said: "I want to show real life in Sudan - we've been marginalised by the rest of the world for a long time."

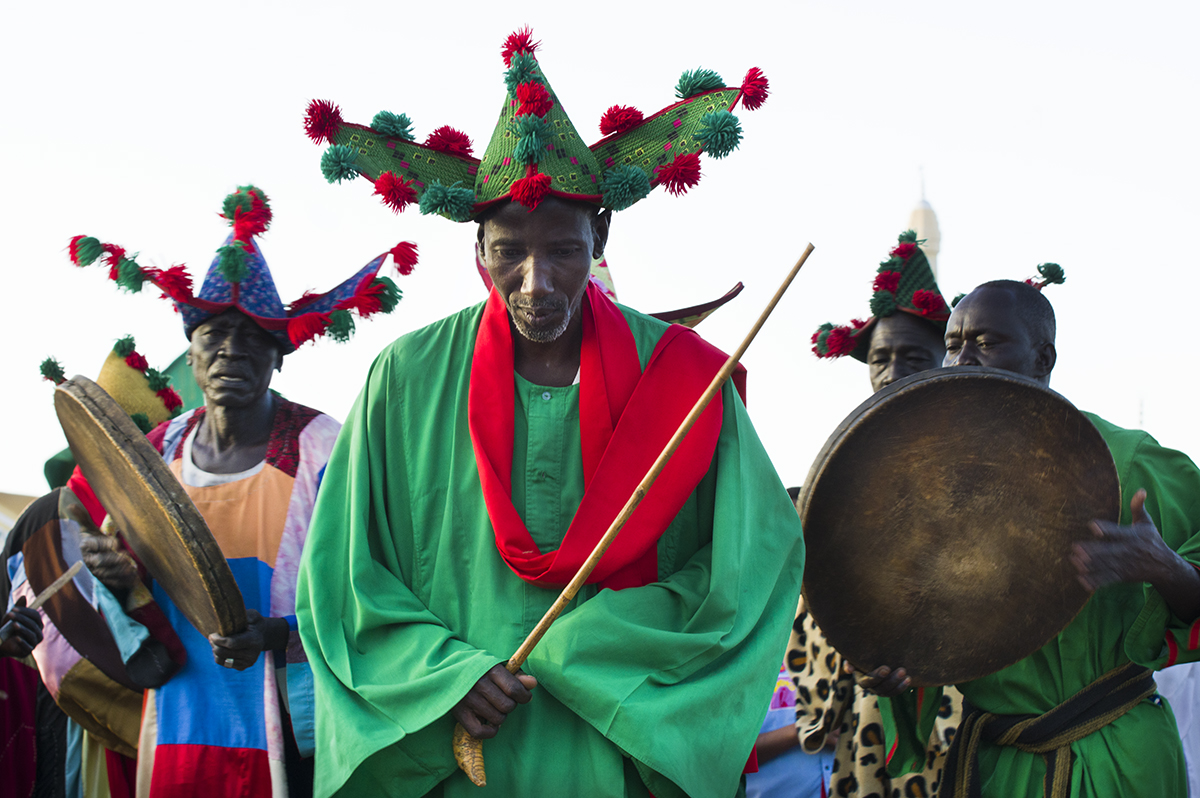
Sufis in Omdurman, by Ola Alsheikh

In October 2018, Amateur Photographer magazine published an article about Alsheikh's pictures of modern Sudan. According to this article, Alsheikh bought her first film camera in 1998, but only got seriously involved in documentary photography about twelve years later, when she switched to digital cameras. Since then, she has used her camera to document everyday life, trying to change social awareness. As an example for her documenting special events and celebrations in Sudan, the article mentions her photographs of popular Sufi rituals in Omdurman, part of greater Khartoum.

During the Sudanese revolution of 2018/19, BBC News published her pictures of demonstrators calling for former president Omar al-Bashir and his government to resign. In 2019, the French newspaper Le Monde published her photo in a story about Eritrean refugees in Khartoum.

== See also ==
- Photography of Sudan
- Women in Sudan
