= Eythar Gubara =

Sudanese photographer and social activist

- Born: 1988 (age 37–38); Khartoum, Sudan
- Education: University of Fine Arts of Hamburg
- Known for: Photography of diversity in Sudan, fashion photography
- Style: Documentary photography
- Awards: Prix de la photo Madame Figaro – Arles 2021
- Website: www.facebook.com/Etharjubaraphotography

Eythar Gubara (Arabic: ايثار جبارة, born 1988 in Khartoum, Sudan), is a Sudanese freelance photographer and activist for human rights. She is mainly known for her documentary images of everyday life in Sudan and of events during the Sudanese Revolution. In her work, she has placed a special focus on images of women, as well as on social diversity in Sudan.

== Life and career ==
Gubara was born in Khartoum, Sudan, and grew up in Atbara, a city some 200 km north of Khartoum. After secondary school, she studied computer science and worked as a sales manager.

After having started as a self-taught amateur photographer at age 20, she attended several workshops at the local German cultural centre – Goethe-Institut – where she joined other Sudanese photographers, who were developing their technical and artistic skills. As part of this group, she also participated in several exhibitions in Khartoum, organized by the German and French cultural centres.

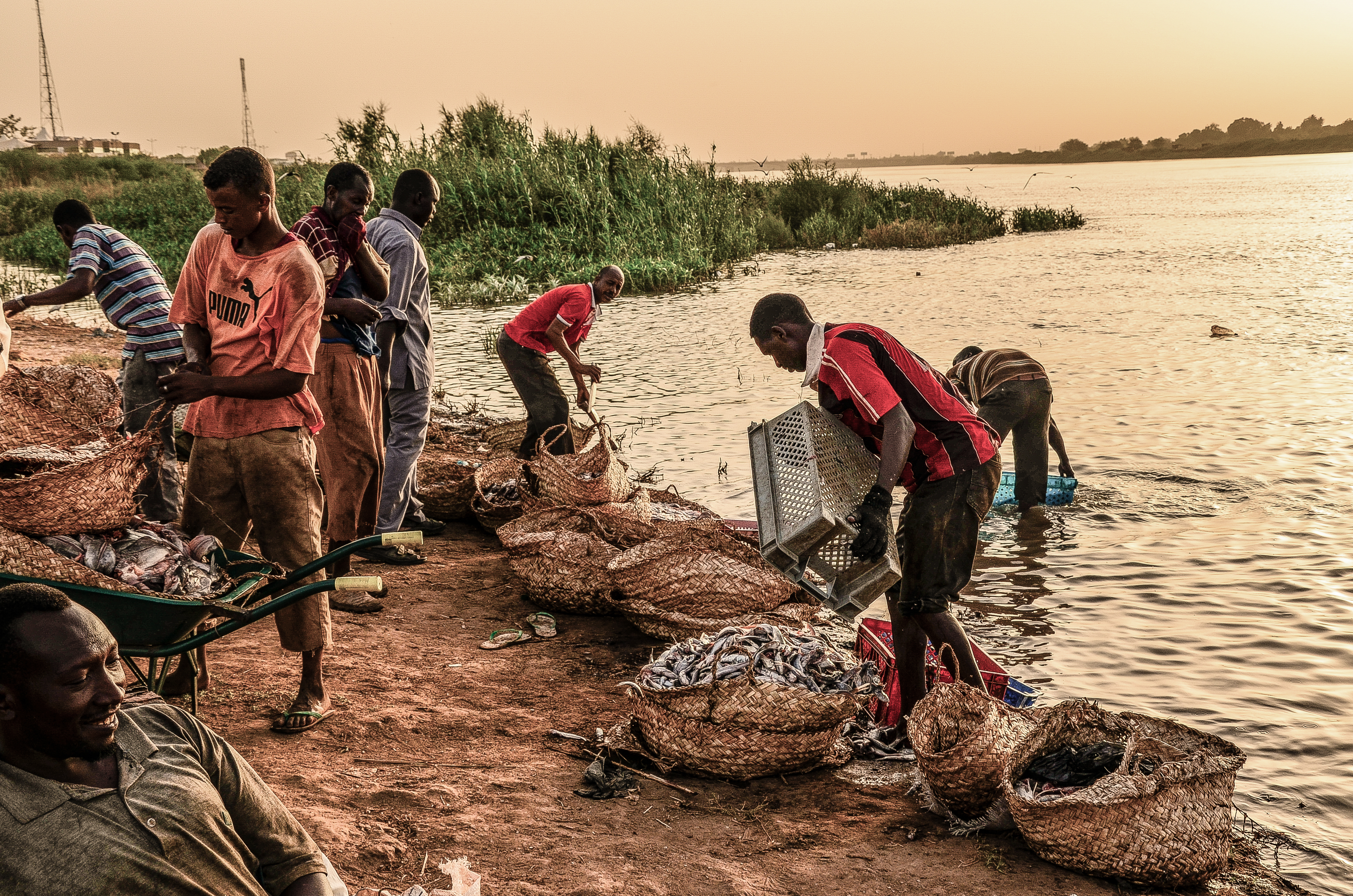
Fishing on the river Nile, by Eythar Gubara, 2014

Her images illustrating civic engagement for human rights and specifically gender inequality of women in Sudan have been shown by internet magazines such as human rights organization Dawn MENA and by the Goethe-Institut Sudan. Further, Gubara was pictured and quoted as part of Sudanese graffiti artist Assil Diab's team, standing before a wall painting of a protester killed during the revolution on BBC News 'Africa Week in Pictures' in July 2019.

Since December 2019, Gubara has been living in Germany and continued her studies and work as photographer at the University of Fine Arts of Hamburg, supported by a scholarship. In June 2020, MOM Art Space in Hamburg showed her personal exhibition The Third of June, reflecting both political events in Khartoum before the Khartoum massacre, as well as images of people living under the former Sudanese government.

In 2021, she was featured among other contemporary Sudanese photographers in the French book Soudan 2019, année zéro. This book about the protests that preceded the fall of Sudan's military government of Omar al-Bashir presents accounts and images illustrating different stages and people involved in the Sudanese revolution up to the destruction of the so-called sit-in area by security forces on 3 June 2019.

Running from 4 July to 26 September 2021, the photography festival Rencontres de la photographie at Arles in southern France announced an exhibition on the Sudanese revolution under the title 'Thawra! ثورة Revolution!'. It presented images by Gubara and other Sudanese photographers from the book Soudan 2019, année zéro. During this festival, Gubara won the photography award Prix de la photo Madame Figaro – Arles 2021 for her photo story «Kandakas can't be stopped» by the French women's magazine Madame Figaro, which entailed the commission for a fashion photo editorial for the magazine. Following this, her pictures of Senegalese fashion model Samb Fatou were published in the magazine's 1 July edition in 2022.

In collaboration with the International Film Festival and Forum on Human Rights (FIFDH), the International Red Cross and Red Crescent Museum in Geneva invited Gubara for a masterclass discussion on Gender & Diversity on 8 March 2022.

== See also ==
- Photography in Sudan
- Visual arts of Sudan
- Soudan 2019, année zéro
