= Francis Gregson =

British photographer and war correspondent in Anglo-Egyptian Sudan

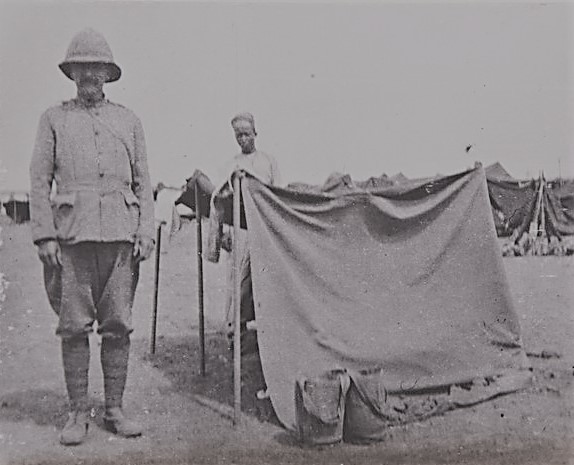
'Our very own extra special correspondent, Sept 1898' from Gregson's album Khartoum 1898

Francis Gregson (active 1898) was a British photographer and war correspondent, attached to the Anglo-Egyptian troops under the command of Herbert Kitchener during the reconquest of the Sudan. Gregson is believed to have been the author of an album of 232 photographs called "Khartoum 1898", taken during the Anglo-Egyptian military campaign in Sudan from 1896 – 98. These photographs in the archives of the National Army Museum, London, have been attributed to Gregson and constitute an important body of photographic records of this British military involvement in the Sudan. They have also been of importance in forming the public's views of 19th century British Imperial warfare.

In the 21st century, these photographs, along with other historic records, including objects taken from Sudan to British museums, have been the subject of critical interpretation of the ethics of British military campaigns in the Sudan. With regard to the changing interpretation of the history of military campaigns, some contemporary historians have argued that war photographers have also contributed to the dehumanisation of the victims.

== Photographic documents of the British military campaign in Sudan ==
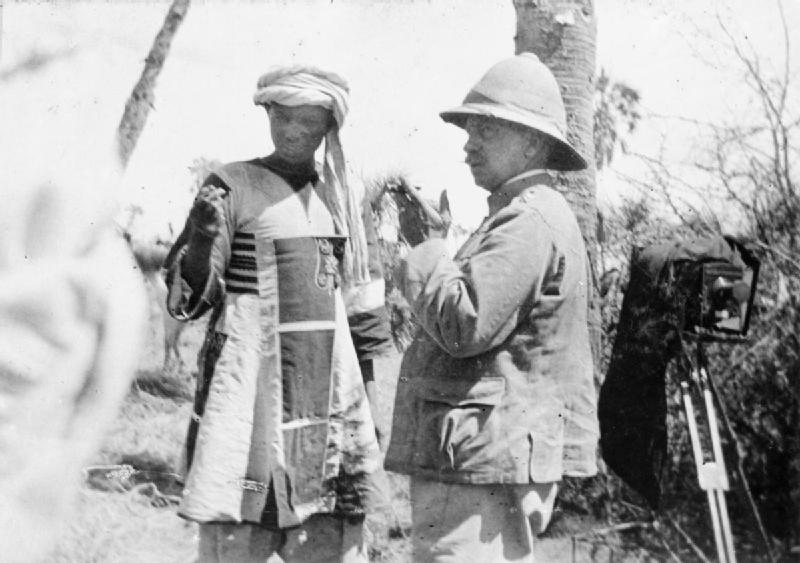
Director of Military Intelligence, Sir Francis Wingate, interrogating Sudanese prisoner Emir Mahmoud, with camera on tripod in the background

During the reconquest of the Sudan, Gregson was a correspondent for the St. James’s Gazette. As a veteran of the campaign against the Mahdists, he already knew the country. In January 1885, he had been involved in the battle of Abu Klea that was meant as support for the failed attempt to rescue General Gordon, who was trapped in Khartoum.

His album of 232 silver gelatin print photographs, titled 'Khartoum 1898', documents the Anglo-Egyptian campaign against the Sudanese Mahdist State as a visual narrative. This narrative started in Alexandria, Egypt, and followed the troops southwards to Omdurman, where the decisive battle took place on 2 September 1898.

During the Anglo-Egyptian conquest of Sudan, Gregson was one of the photographers who documented the advance of British troops and the victory of Lord Kitchener's troops over the Mahdist forces. These historical photographs in the archives of the National Army Museum, London, include not only numerous pictures of the Anglo-Egyptian troops and their officers, but also photographs of defeated Sudanese, such as the commander at the Battle of Atbara, Emir Mahmoud.

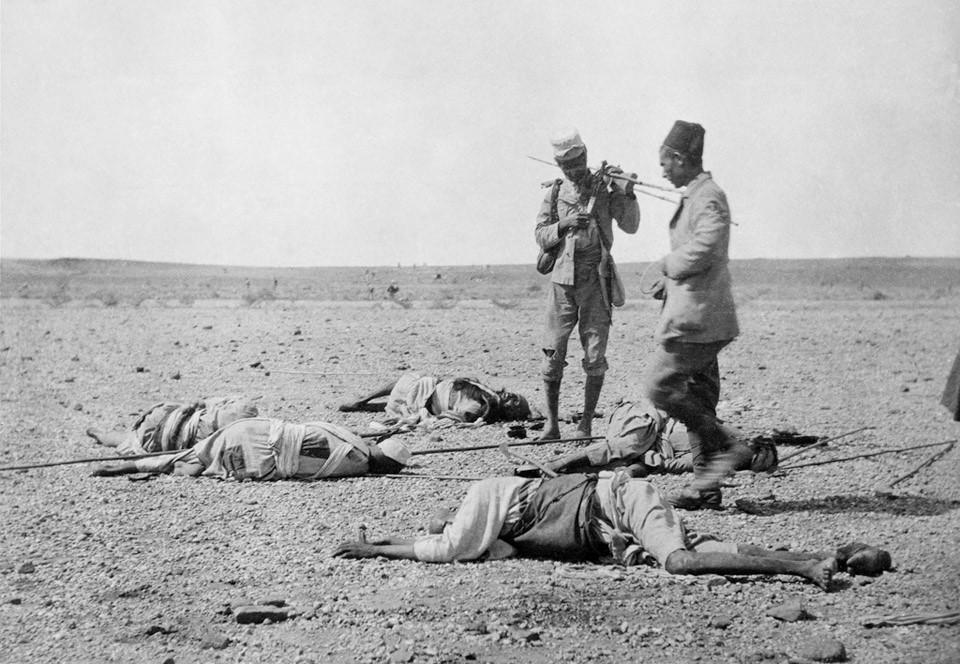
Egyptian troops looting from dead soldiers, 1898

In Gregson's images, corpses, moving distant enemies and approaching death were captured in the instant. Some of these pictures show prisoners with traditional weapons and dress, like the characteristic jibba coats, – items that were later exhibited in British museums as trophies of war. Furthermore, there are several photographs of dead bodies, some of them being plundered by Egyptian soldiers, like the picture entitled 'Looting after the Battle' in the original album.

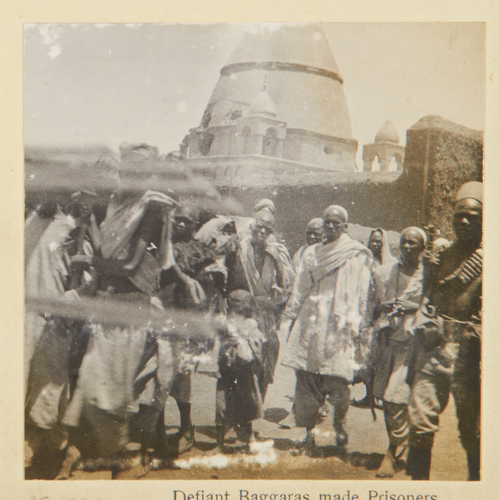
Defiant Baggaras in front of The Mahdi's tomb, after the Battle of Omdurman, 1898

Another photograph shows defeated Sudanese standing in front of the bombed-out tomb of the Mahdi in Omdurman. Looking back on his personal experience as a newspaper reporter on Kitchener's expedition, Winston Churchill stated in his book, The River War: An Historical Account of the Reconquest of the Soudan (1899), that ‘[t]his place had been for more than ten years the most sacred place and holy thing that the people of the Soudan knew."

After his return to London, Gregson produced an album of photographs taken with his Kodak camera. Copies were presented to Queen Victoria as well as to the commanding officers who had overseen his documentary photography in Sudan.

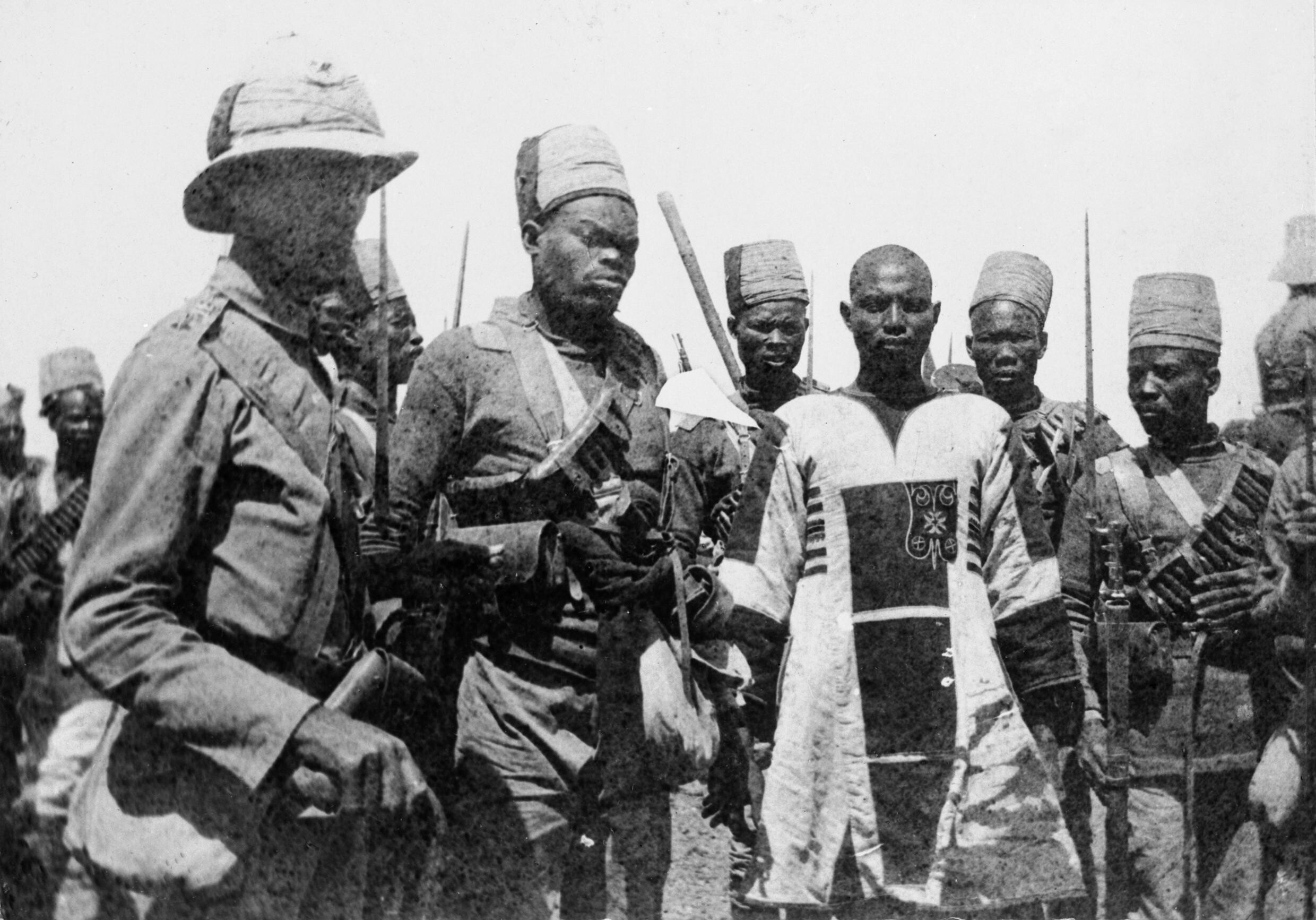
Emir Mahmoud, a Mahdist leader, as prisoner after the Battle of Atbara

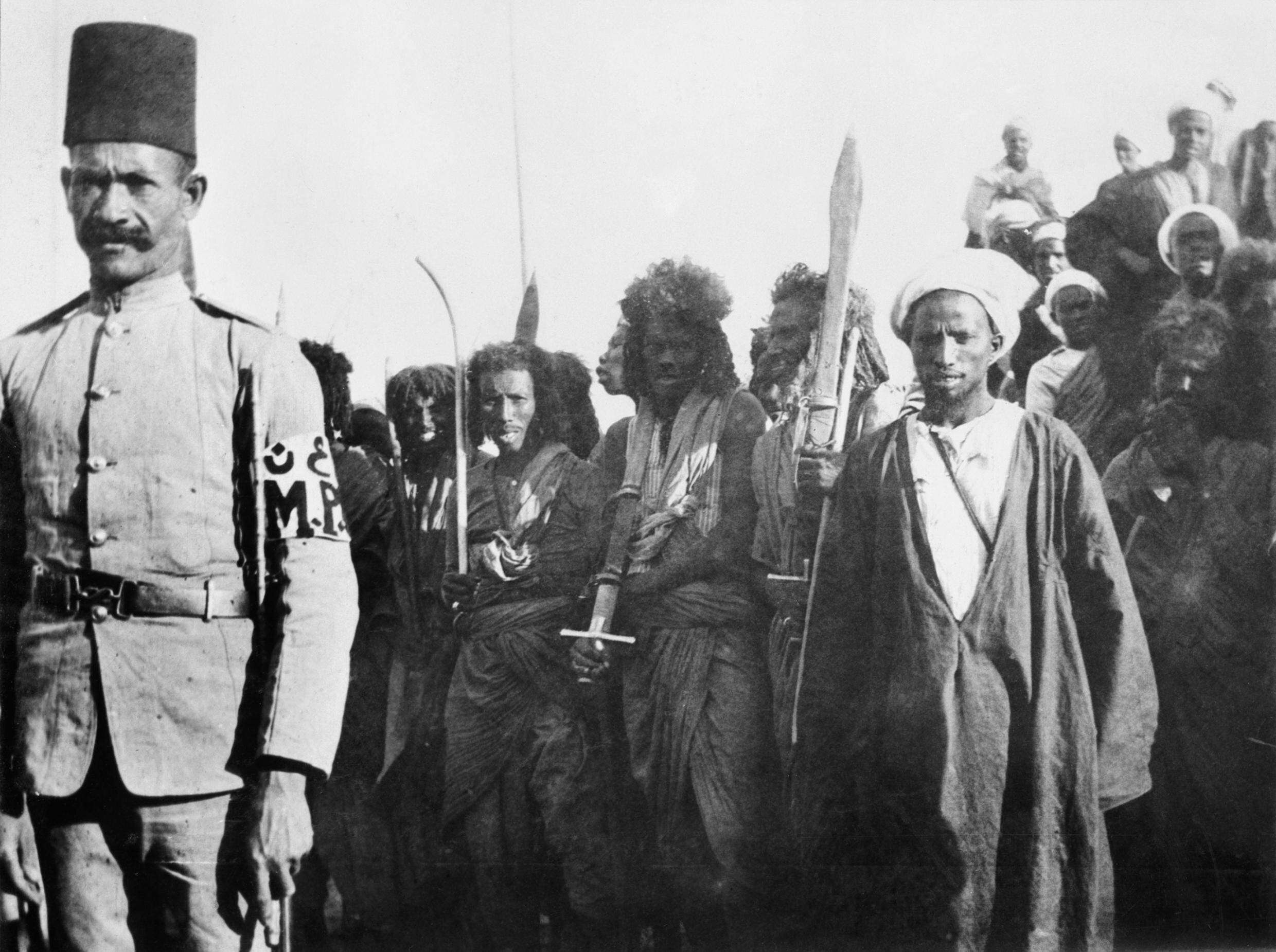
A group of Hadendoa Sudanese prisoners bearing weapons. An Egyptian military policeman stands in the foreground.

== Reception ==
In her study entitled "Viewing Violence in the British Empire: Images of Atrocity from the Battle of Omdurman, 1898", historian Michelle Gordon published a detailed discussion of Gregson's photographs. Taken after the Battle of Omdurman on 2 September 1898, the final and decisive battle of the Anglo-Egyptian Reconquest of the Sudan (1896–98), these photographs constitute an early example of photography by a war correspondent. According to her interpretation, this campaign was "controversial for the methods used against the Sudanese soldiers of the Mahdia, which included the massacring of the enemy wounded and those trying to surrender."

With reference to what she calls "atrocity photography", she further claims that photographs from this campaign "have been neither sufficiently integrated into the historiography of the British Empire nor the body of work on warfare and photography. This situation is indicative of wider issues related to imperial historians’ treatment – and at times, sanitisation – of colonial violence."

Similar views were forwarded by Paul Fox, historian at the University of York, who published the following comments in 2018: "Through a study of the photographic record of the British campaign in the Egyptian Sudan, this chapter argues that the unprecedented presence of the recently invented Kodak transformed how armed conflict could be represented to domestic audiences, and that this was recognised by Anglo-Egyptian leaders, who staged events associated with the conclusion of the campaign with the camera in mind, in pursuit of impression management in Britain."

In an earlier article of 2015, titled "Spoils of War in Egypt, 1798-1882", Fox commented on photographs attributed to Gregson as well as on looted objects and war trophies like swords, banners or uniforms, with regard to the effect these historical objects had on public opinion in Great Britain:

"From time to time between 1798 and 1898 soldiers and sailors like Herbert Robinson returned from Egypt with accounts of their experience, and with objects they had taken in combat, found on corpses, or purchased from Egyptians, Sudanese, or each other. Looting and trophy taking played an important part in defining personal and collective identities that were shaped by their cross-cultural experiences. The things people brought home influenced the way Egypt and the Egyptian Soudan were perceived and understood more widely in Britain, and how Britons at war constructed a sense of themselves."

Referring to the wider question of the responsibility of photographers in times of war and atrocities, both from the beginnings of photography and up to present times, Michelle Gordon gave the following assessment: "I argue that the album represents a part of the atrocity and, by extension, in his actions as photographer, Gregson is part of these events as a perpetrator of violence."

In his book The violence of colonial photography, French historian Daniel Foliard commented on the character of this kind of war photography as opposed to the images showing battles in earlier times: "This Kodak-recorded annihilation signalled the advent of a form of armed violence that was coldly logistical, even down to its visualisation. The aesthetics of the enticing engravings and paintings of the past were becoming less relevant to photographers: war had become ugly." To make room for self-sufficient images, the written information that still dominated the layout of most contemporary publications was reduced to brief captions.

The unprecedented nature of the photographic coverage of the Sudan Campaign cannot be emphasised enough. This shift was also visible in the dissemination of the photographs taken during the military expedition. The victory was celebrated in every conceivable type of print media, and the event became an invasive media object at that time. Photography was central to the construction of the colonial event.

— Daniel Foliard, The Violence of Colonial Photography,

== See also ==
- Anglo-Egyptian invasion of Sudan 1896-99
- War photography
- Photography in Sudan

== Literature ==
- Foliard, Daniel (2022). The Violence of Colonial Photography. Manchester University Press. doi:10.7765/9781526163325.00013. ISBN 978-1-5261-6332-5.
- Gordon, Michelle. Extreme violence and the 'British Way'. Colonial warfare in Perak, Sierra Leone and Sudan. London: Bloomsbury Academic, 2020. ISBN 9781350156883
- Fox Paul (2018) "Kodaking a Just War: Photography, Architecture and the Language of Damage in the Egyptian Sudan, 1884–1898." In: Clarke J., Horne J. (eds) Militarized Cultural Encounters in the Long Nineteenth Century. War, Culture and Society, 1750-1850. Palgrave Macmillan, Cham. doi:10.1007/978-3-319-78229-4_5 ISBN 978-3-319-78229-4
- Killingray, David, and Andrew Roberts. "An outline history of photography in Africa to ca. 1940." History in Africa 16 (1989): 197-208. doi:10.2307/3171784
