= Mohamed Nureldin Abdallah =

Sudanese photojournalist

- محمد نور الدين عبدالله
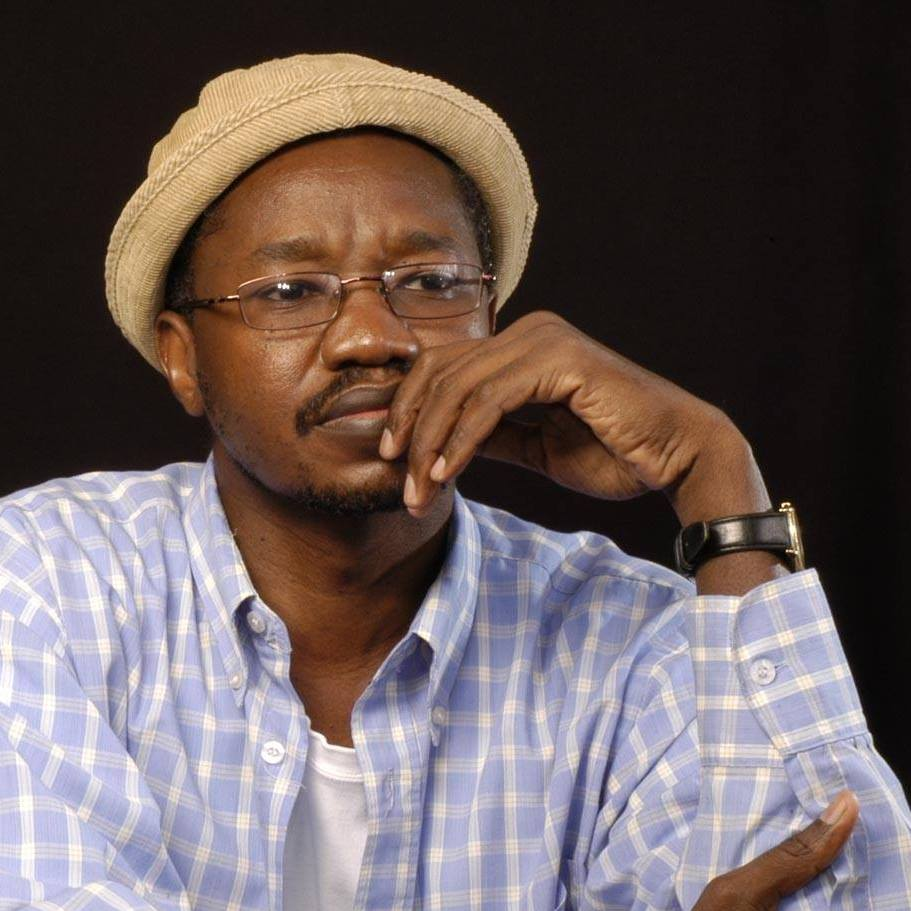
- Abdallah in 2010
- Born: El-Fashir, Sudan
- Education: Sudan University of Science and Technology
- Occupation: Photojournalism
- Website: Reuters

Mohamed Nureldin Abdallah (Arabic: محمد نور الدين عبدالله) is a Sudanese photojournalist who has been working as resident photographer for Reuters since 2005 and has also worked for Agence France-Presse, Oxford Analytica and other news outlets. His photographs of Sudan, often focusing on the effects of war and social exclusion on ordinary people, have been featured in numerous international news reports.

== Early life and education ==
Abdallah was born in Al-Fashir, the capital city of North Darfur, Sudan, and graduated with a degree in graphic design from the College of Fine and Applied Arts, Sudan University of Science and Technology. He studied photography with Professor Ali Muhammad Othman, the former dean of the college.

== Photojournalism ==
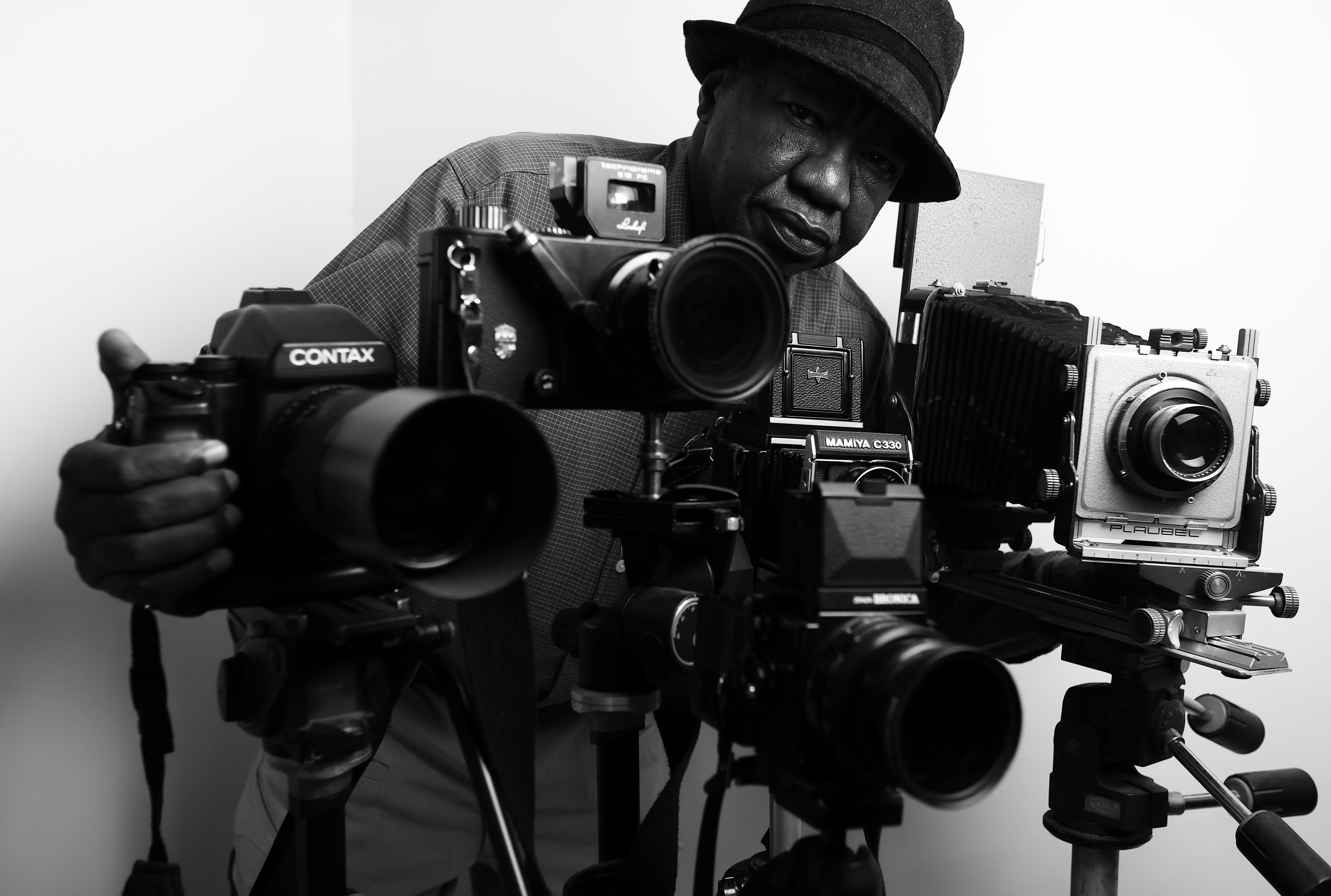
Abdallah in 2023 with multiple cameras

Abdallah joined Reuters in 2005 to cover unrest in the far south of Khartoum, which led to the burning of police stations by Sudanese refugees displaced mainly from the southern parts of Sudan. The unrest ended up with over 17 people dead and dozens wounded. He then worked in Darfur, photographing soldiers from the African Union Mission in Sudan involved in the ongoing Darfur civil war between the government military and so-called rebels. This war led to the Darfur genocide, which claimed between 80,000 and 400,000 lives and displaced more than a million people, and it also had a great impact on Abdallah by shaping his passion to tell stories through his photos. Some of these stories include:

- Harvesting gum arabic in Sudan – in pictures. Photo story on one of Sudan's most widely used agricultural products in The Guardian
- Getting Sudan's railways on track, detailing the deteriorating status of the Sudanese railways, which was once Africa's largest railway network, and the anticipated revival through funding from the People's Republic of China.
- Youth of today in Sudan, which navigates the relationship between the photographer and young people in Khartoum. Before taking portraits of young people, Abdallah needed to establish trust with them. In the beginning, they asked “Who are you? Why do you want to take our photos?” and frequently: “Are you from the security services?”
- Darfur's hopeful 12-year-olds, a look in 2015 at 12 years of war in Darfur through portraits of 12 camp-born children, who want to be aircraft engineers, doctors, etc. The photos were taken in Dereige, Alsalam, and Aradamata camps and present optimistic views of the children, despite ongoing instability in the region.
- Fears at Nile's convergence in Sudan that new dam will sap river's strength, a photo story about the lives of brickmakers working in Tuti Island and other villages on the River Nile, and who are expected to be the first to feel the environmental effects of the Grand Ethiopian Renaissance Dam.

Dialog by Mohamed Nureldin Abdallah

Abdallah's photojournalism often focuses on political turmoil in Sudan and neighbouring countries. His photographic reporting has documented, how ordinary people are suffering from wars and natural catastrophes. During the Sudanese Revolution, he was one of the few photographers working on the ground, after the military government expelled all foreign journalists. His more than 20 years of photojournalist for Reuters, Agence France-Presse, Oxford Analytica, among many news outlets, captured a nation in transition from civil war to the struggle for democracy. Abdallah's work has been used by numerous major international news outlets, and his images have been included in different articles and books to illustrate elements of culture, society, religion, politics, economy and ethnography in Sudan.

== Visual art ==
Abdallah is also known for his creative fine-art photography. In 1995, he won the first international prize for digital photography from the Pacific Asian Cultural Centre at the 15th UNESCO meeting in Tokyo. In addition, his artistic creation “Dialog” won 1st place at the 5th Tarifa Film Festival from the Andalusia Photography Center, Spain, in 2008. He described this series of black-and-white photographs as follows: "The man of the age who became trapped in many cages: the cages of jobs, delusion, robbery, alienation, locked in his thoughts and others, and locked into the world of infinity."

== See also ==
- Photography in Sudan
- Darfur genocide
- Visual arts of Sudan
- Jan Broekhuijse – Dutch anthropologist and ethnographer (1929–2020)
