= Mohamed Altoum =

Sudanese photographer

Mohammed Altoum
- محمد التوم
- Born: Khartoum, Sudan
- Education: Hanover University of Applied Sciences and Arts, Germany
- Occupation: Photographer
- Known for: documentary photography

Mohamed Altoum (born in Khartoum, Sudan) is a Sudanese freelance documentary photographer. He is one of the founding members of the 'Sudanese Photographers Group' and became known for his photographic storytelling about migrants of the Sudanese diaspora living in Nairobi, Kenya. Another of his photo stories is called Hoshmmar, where he traced the life of his late father through Kenya, Sudan and Egypt to explore his heritage, originating from the culture of Nubians in northern Sudan.

== Life and artistic career ==
Altoum studied computer science, but afterwards embarked on digital photography. As there was no formal teaching of photography in Sudan, this was only possible by informal learning and exchanging experiences with fellow amateur photographers, like Ala Kheir and others. In an interview with Sudanese journalist Omnia Shawkat, Altoum talked about the beginnings of his informal group of young photographers, who created the Sudanese Photographers Group from 2007 onwards by exchanging pictures and experiences on social media such as Flickr and Facebook. According to Altoum, one of the aims of this group was to document initiatives of civil society groups, supporting their humanitarian activities. The group also started to enlarge its network, both in East Africa and on an international level, "to enhance our skills and showcase Sudanese photography to the world." From 2014, the Goethe-Institute in Khartoum organised training workshops, conducted by professional photographers from Africa and Europe. Out of these workshops resulted several photo exhibitions in Khartoum, called Mugran Foto Week, where his work was featured along other Sudanese photographers.

In 2017, Altoum was selected for the Artists in Residency Programme by Africa Centre in Cape Town, South Africa. The same year, he participated in the 'Arab Documentary Photography Program' supported by the Magnum Foundation, the Prince Claus Fund and the Arab Fund for Arts and Culture (AFAC) in Beirut, Lebanon. His photo story about abandoned cinema theatres in Khartoum was shortlisted for the Contemporary African Photography Prize in Basel, Switzerland the same year.

Since 2018, Altoum has been a member of the African Photojournalism Database (APJD) of the World Press Photo Foundation. In 2019, he studied documentary photography and photojournalism in the international class at the Hanover University of Applied Sciences and Arts, Germany.

In 2019, the New York Times published an article based on Altoum's research and photo story about migrants of Sudanese origin living in Nairobi. Also in 2019, his photographs were presented in the seventh edition of Sharjah Art Foundation’s annual photography exhibition.

Altoum's images have been published by Al-Jazeera, World Press Photo, CNN Africa, BBC Africa, The HuffPost, as well as in exhibitions and festivals in Africa, the Middle East and Europe.

== See also ==
- Photography in Sudan
