= Claude Iverné =

French photographer amd researcher

Claude Inverné
- Born: 1963 (age 62–63)
- Citizenship: France
- Occupation: Photographer
- Awards: HCB Award

Claude Iverné (born 1963) is a French photographer, researcher, and visual artist. His work in Sudan combines documentary photography with archival study, and he has contributed to projects such as SudanPhotoGraphs and Bilad es Sudan.

== Early life and background ==
Claude Iverné was born in 1963 in France. He trained in photography in Paris, London, and New York, initially working in fashion photography before shifting to documentary practice.

== Career ==
Iverné first traveled to Sudan in 1990s, beginning a long-term engagement with the country. He also took several trips to Egypt, Sudan, Morocco and Asia Over the following decades, he documented social, cultural, and environmental changes through photography. In 2003, he established Elnour (meaning "light" in Arabic), a publishing house and collective that brings together Sudanese photographers, researchers, and international artists.

His work combines documentary photography with archival and anthropological research, focusing on identity, territory, and representation. Iverné founded SudanPhotoGraphs, a long-term editorial and research project dedicated to Sudanese photography. The project combines photography, historical research, and contributions from multiple disciplines to document Sudan’s visual heritage. It also aims to preserve photographic archives and promote Sudanese photographers within international collections. Bilad es Sudan is a long-term photographic project developed over nearly two decades. The project documents both North and South Sudan, using different photographic approaches to reflect diverse cultural and geographical contexts. It has been exhibited internationally, including in Paris and New York.

== Exhibitions and recognition ==
In 2015, Iverné received the HCB Award from the Fondation Henri Cartier-Bresson for his work on Sudan.

His work has been exhibited internationally at institutions and festivals including Rencontres d'Arles, Fondation Henri Cartier-Bresson, Aperture Foundation, and Musée Nicéphore Niépce. Iverné’s work combines documentary photography with ethnographic and archival approaches. His projects focus on themes such as cultural identity, memory, and representation.
