= Laetitia Ky =

Ivorian artist and hair sculptor

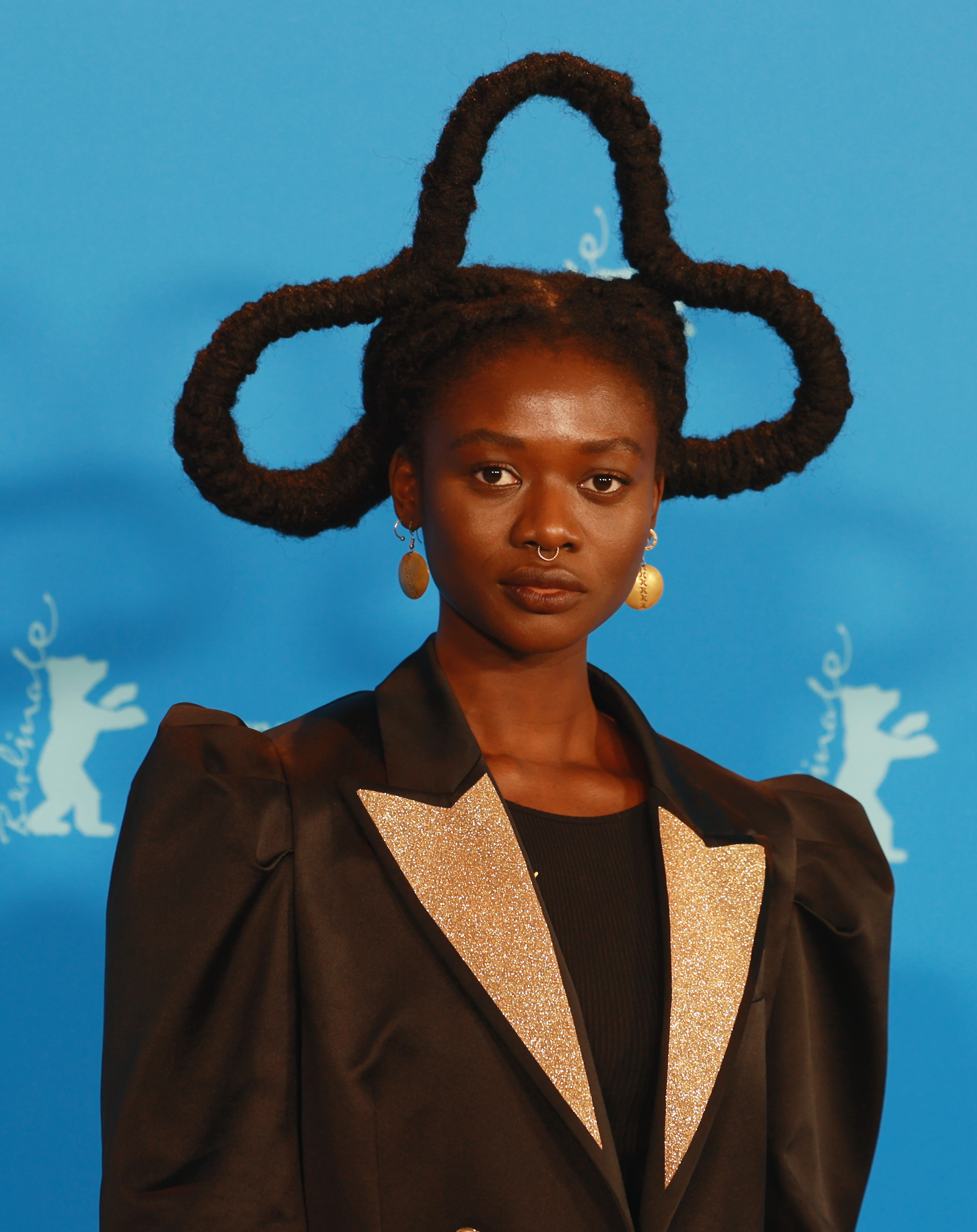
- Ky at the Berlinale 2023
- Born: 1996 (age 29–30); Abidjan, Ivory Coast
- Education: Institut national polytechnique Félix Houphouët-Boigny
- Style: Sculpture

Laetitia Ky (born 1996, Abidjan) is an Ivorian feminist artist who creates sculptures from her hair. She is seen by many as a figurehead in the natural hair movement.

== Biography ==
Ky was born in 1996 and grew up in Abidjan; her parents divorced when she was young. She has a degree in Business Administration from Institut national polytechnique Félix Houphouët-Boigny in Yamoussoukro. After graduating, Ky decided to pursue the arts rather than business, and began to teach herself to sew, with the intent of having a career in fashion.

After Ky began losing hair at age 16, she gained interest in the American natural hair movement; she has stated that, "despite living in a country full of black women," she had never before seen a black woman with natural hair.

== Career ==
After a Facebook account she followed shared a photo album of twentieth-century, pre-colonial African women in 2016, Ky was inspired to sculpt her hair in a manner similar to the featured women. She posted her sculptures to Instagram; inspired by the positive response from other black women, she continued to regularly post hair sculptures. In 2017, after one of her sculptures went viral, Ky began getting approached by international magazines.

In 2017, Ky hosted her first "Ky Braids" workshop to teach the art-form to others.

A music collaboration followed with Di'Ja, whose hair she covered in printed wax cloth inspired by the hair of Himba women.
Ky launched her fashion brand in 2018. Named Kystroy, it aims to be inclusive, using body positive language to describe clothing sizes for example.

Ky's work was featured in the 2022 Venice Biennale, inside the Ivory Coast Pavilion.

In the same year, LIS10 Gallery presented in Arezzo "Empow’Hair", her first solo show, together with a Marco Rambaldi's installation.

Ky is represented by Lis10 Gallery in Arezzo and Paris.

== Style and Method ==
Ky's hallmark style is creating sculptures from wire, thread and her dreadlocks, which are lengthened with weaves into her natural hair. The sculptures are made while the extensions are attached to her natural hair. She calls this style the Ky Concept. These styles express her creativity and increasingly, her politics.

Each sculpture takes between twenty minutes and six hours to create. The first iteration of her sculptural hair art involved wrapping braids in African wax print cloth. On rare occasions she has sculpted the hair of another person, such as her younger sister, who she included in her artwork.

== Activism ==
Over time Ky's sculptures have become more political, and in 2017 she used her platform on social media to raise awareness. That piece showed a man lifting up a woman's skirt, sculpted from her braids. The same year, she produced a piece that created bulging muscles over her slim arm, with the intent to raise awareness about bullying, especially the damage it can do in childhood, which Ky experienced.

Sex-based oppression is a recurring theme in Ky's art; she has made sculptures in protest of practices such as breast flattening, female genital mutilation, and American anti-abortion laws. Ky has cited this as a source of tension between Western and African feminists, saying that although she respects the Western feminist perspective, "as an African artist and feminist, I have the duty to be loud about our perspective that is way too often silenced and forgotten." After a 2023 interview with Télérama did not include mention of her stance against the rights of transgender people, public outry led to the newspaper adding a correction.

Ky began to incorporate more messaging about race in her art after gaining more international attention. She has stated that although she had previously felt the desire to change her skin color and African features, embracing her natural hair had led her to additionally embrace other African features; this has been a motivating factor in creating natural hair centered art.

Ky is seen by many as a figurehead in the natural hair movement.

== Filmography ==
Year	Title	Role	Director	Notes
2020	Night of the Kings	The Queen	Philippe Lacôte	
2023	Disco Boy	Udoka	Giacomo Abbruzzese	
2025	Promised Sky	Jolie	Erige Sehiri	

== Awards ==
In 2018, Ky was selected as one of the top twenty young people for On the Rise Côte d'Ivoire a programme run by L’Association des Conseils en Lobbying et Affaires Publiques de Côte d'Ivoire (ACLAP-CI). In same year she was voted one of the Prix Jeunesse Francophone 3535's thirty-five influential young people in the French-speaking world.

In 2019, Ky was selected by Paper magazine as one of the top '100 People Taking Over 2019'. At the end of that year, she was awarded a contract as a result of the Elite Model competition social media category, in partnership with TikTok.
