= Eiman Yousif =

Sudanese actress (born 1992)

- إيمان يوسف
- Born: Eiman Yousif Hassan Madani; Khartoum, Sudan
- Education: University of Khartoum
- Known for: Goodbye Julia

Eiman Yousif (Arabic: إيمان يوسف), is a Sudanese actor, singer, songwriter, and human rights activist. She became known for playing the character Mona in the award-winning 2023 drama film Goodbye Julia, directed by Mohamed Kordofani.

== Early life and education ==
Born on 17 December 1992 in Khartoum, Eiman Yousif earned both her bachelor's and master's degrees from the School of Management Studies at the University of Khartoum.

During her time as a student, Eiman was a member of the faculty choir.

== Career ==
It was on social media that Mohamed Kordofani first encountered Eiman, in a viral live video in which she was singing in one of her private concerts at Someet Gallery in Khartoum. Although she was not a professional actor, he later cast her in the drama film Goodbye Julia where she played the co-lead character, Mona. She also recorded one of the movie's main soundtracks, Tell me how? (Arabic: قول لي كيف, romanized: Gol Ley Kef), which also features Sudanese rapper, Nile.

As a singer and composer, she released her single "Where is The Dream" expressing her sentiments about the deteriorating political situation in Sudan following the revolution. She was also one of the leading voices in the 2024 musical collaboration "We Stay Well Together" 2024 musical collaboration, advocating for peaceful coexistence in Sudan. Drawing attention to violations of children's rights during the ongoing war in her homeland, she participated in Unite with the Children of Sudan Conference organized by Save the Children, USAID, and UNICEF in Nairobi, where she contributed with her song "Inta Altreeg" ("You're the Path").

== Other activities ==
She was part of the Bait Al Oud Orchestra, which performed in Sudan and internationally.

Eiman found herself in the public sphere when a photo of her participating in a demonstration went viral, becoming an iconic image of the 2018 Sudanese revolution. She has become an activist for human rights, HIV/AIDS, violence against women and children, and peace.

She sat on a jury panel of the Aswan International Women's Film Festival in April 2024.

== Personal life ==
Following the outbreak of war in Sudan, which began in Khartoum, Eiman was forced to leave her home after the filming of Goodbye Julia. Along with two sisters and their children, she travelled through Dongola and Wadi Halfa to Cairo, Egypt. She was unable to attend international screenings of Goodbye Julia, as she may not be able to return to Egypt if she left, and she could not return to Sudan. Her family home in Khartoum was robbed by the Rapid Support Forces after their departure.

== Recognition and awards ==
Goodbye Julia scooped Sudan's first-ever international nomination at the Cannes Film Festival in 2023, winning the Prix de la Liberté (Freedom Award).

In 2024 Yousif won an award at the Arab Radio and TV Festival Tunisia.. She also received Special Mentions at the IFF Art Film in Košice, Slovakia, and the Rotterdam Arab Film Festival.

Eiman was featured as a participant in the 2026 Berlinale Talents participants at the 2026 Berlin Film Festival, selected as one of 200, out of 3,438 applications from 120 countries.

Awards
| Award | Year | Category | Movie | Result | Ref. |
|---|---|---|---|---|---|
| Dakhla Film Festival | 2024 | Best Female Performance | Goodbye Julia | Won | |
| Critics Awards for Arab Films | 2024 | Best Actress | Goodbye Julia | Nominated | |
| Muslim International Film Festival | 2023 | Best Actor | Goodbye Julia | Won | |
| Cyprus International Film Festival | 2023 | Best Leading Actress in a First Feature Film | Goodbye Julia | Won | |
