= Goodbye Julia =

2023 Sudanese drama film

- Arabic: وداعاً جوليا
- Directed by: Mohamed Kordofani
- Written by: Mohamed Kordofani
- Produced by: Amjad Abu Alala; Mohammed Alomda
- Starring: Eiman Yousif; Siran Riak; Nazar Gomaa; Ger Duany
- Cinematography: Pierre de Villiers
- Edited by: Heba Othman
- Music by: Mazin Hamid
- Production companies: Station Films; CULT; Klozium Studios
- Distributed by: MAD Solutions
- Release date: May 2023 (76th Cannes Film Festival)
- Running time: 120 minutes
- Countries: Sudan; Egypt; Germany; France; Sweden; Saudi Arabia
- Language: Sudanese Arabic
- Budget: $500,000 USD
- Box office: $330,972

Goodbye Julia (Arabic: وداعاً جوليا, romanized: Wadāʻan Jūlyā) is a 2023 Sudanese drama film directed by Mohamed Kordofani. It is Kordofani's first feature film and the first movie from Sudan ever to be presented in the Un Certain Regard section of the Cannes Film Festival. Goodbye Julia was selected by the Sudanese National Committee operating in exile to compete for the Best International Feature Film at the 96th Academy Awards, but was later not included in the shortlist.

== Plot ==
In August 2005, a civil war between the Sudanese government and the southern Sudan People's Liberation Movement (SPLM) has recently ended, and SPLM leader John Garang has been made Vice President. Mona is a well-off Muslim housewife from northern Sudan who lives with her husband Akram in Khartoum. Julia is a poor Christian from the South who lives with her husband Santino and young son Daniel. When Garang's death in a helicopter crash is announced, riots break out in the city, including Mona's neighborhood. Julia's family is evicted, and they move into a makeshift shelter. While driving nearby, Mona accidentally hits Daniel with her car and flees the scene, with Santino pursuing her on his motorcycle. Mona calls her husband Akram and says she is being chased by a Southerner. When Mona and Santino arrive at the house, Akram fatally shoots him. Distraught, Mona later confronts Akram for killing Santino, and Akram says it was self-defense.

Julia searches for Santino. When she cannot find him, she starts working as a street vendor. Mona locates Julia and hires her as a maid. When Julia is evicted again, Mona provides Julia and Daniel a room to live inside her home. Mona marks dishes with red nail polish to indicate which ones Julia can use. The two women talk to each other about their lives: Mona tells Julia that she was a singer until Akram made her stop; Julia tells Mona that she thinks Santino may have left her. Mona offers to pay for Daniel's education at a private school, and Julia accepts. Later, Akram tells Mona that Daniel will not fit in at the private school. He tells Mona that she should have befriended a neighbor rather than a "slave". Mona asks Akram not to use that word. He responds that Mona is racist too and that her relationship with Julia is not a friendship because Julia is her employee. Mona scrapes the red nail polish off the dishes.

The timeline jumps to December 2010. Julia meets Majier, an SPLM member, while he is speaking to a crowd about the need for a separate country for southerners. Julia takes Mona to her church. She is recognized by a choir member who convinces her to perform a song with them. Majier pursues Julia romantically. At his Christmas party, they kiss. He asks her to move to the south with him and offers to have his contacts investigate Santino's disappearance. She declines and walks away from him.

Daniel, now 11 years old, is being bullied at school. When he discovers his father's motorcycle in a neighbor's possession, Mona tries to dissuade him from investigating further. He confides in Majier who comes to the house with armed SPLM members. Majier accuses Akram of killing Santino, and Julia tells Majier to stop. At Mona's prompting, Akram apologizes. Majier slaps Akram in the face, says Julia does not deserve his love, and leaves. Akram and Mona argue about Santino's death and their relationship, ending with Mona saying she wants to sing again and Akram telling her to move out.

The referendum on south Sudanese statehood passes with more than 98% of the vote. Julia and Daniel have moved out of Akram's house. Mona finds Julia's new place and asks her how long she had known the truth about Santino's disappearance. Julia said she realized early on, having found Santino's wallet in Akram's house. Mona accuses Julia of taking advantage of her, and Julia says that she worked for Mona for Daniel's sake and that Mona was exploiting her poverty. Mona lays her head on Julia's lap, and Julia rubs her shoulder. In a montage, Julia and Daniel board a ferry flying the Sudanese and South Sudanese flags, Mona sings, and Majier drives a truck of soldiers. The final scene shows Daniel sitting in the front seat of the truck holding a rifle.

== Cast ==
- Eiman Yousif as Mona, a Muslim Northern woman
- Siran Riak as Julia, a Christian Southern woman
- Nazar Gomaa as Akram, Mona's husband
- Ger Duany as Majier, SPLM member and Julia's love interest
- Paulino Victor Bol as Santino, Julia's husband
- Louis Daniel Ding and Stephanos James Peter as Daniel, Julia and Santino's son

== Production ==
Goodbye Julia is director and screenwriter Mohamed Kordofani's first feature-length film. Kordofani, a former engineer and self-taught filmmaker, is from northern Sudan. The film was inspired by his experiences living in Khartoum. When Garang died, Kordofani was in his early 20s and felt angry at southern Sudanese people for the resulting violence. According to Kordofani, he began to notice the racism faced by southern Sudanese people after they overwhelmingly voted for independence in 2011, and concluded that it had greatly contributed to their decision to secede. He has likened the racism to social apartheid, noting that the only southerners he knew at the time were maids. Kordofani has stated that the film was "part of a continuous effort to get rid of that inherited racism, motivated by a sense of guilt and a desire for reconciliation and a call for it, even if it seems late".

The film stars Eiman Yousif as Mona. Kordofani cast Yousif after seeing a YouTube video of her singing. At the time, she was working full time as a sales executive while studying music and singing on the side. Yousif's co-star Siran Riak plays Julia, the Christian southern Sudanese woman employed by Mona as a maid. Yousif cast Riak, a supermodel, after seeing her work on social media. Goodbye Julia is Yousif and Riak's first film appearances. Supporting actors include Nazar Gomaa and Ger Duany.

The film received financial support from multiple sources, including the Beirut-based Arab Fund for Arts and Culture (AFAC), the Red Sea Fund in Saudi Arabia, and El Gouna Film Festival’s CineGouna Platform. It was produced by Sudanese director Amjad Abu Alala and co-produced by several production companies from Europe and the Middle East.

Filming occurred over 40 days between 6 November and 15 December 2022. The musical score was created by Sudanese musician Mazin Hamid. One song written by northern musician Sayed Khalifa is performed by Yousif backed by a choir in a southern Christian church. Additionally, Yousif performed Tell me how? (Arabic: قول لي كيف, romanized: Gol Ley Kef) with Sudanese rapper Nile. On 13 April 2023, Kordofani traveled to Beirut to work on the sound design. Two days later, another civil war started in Khartoum. By May, most of the cast and crew had left Sudan for Egypt.

== Release ==
Goodbye Julia premiered with an audience of 1,000 spectators on 20 May 2023 in the Un Certain Regard section of the 2023 Cannes Film Festival. The screening and the following post-premiere Q&A with the cast and crew, including comments on the ongoing 2023 Sudan conflict, received standing ovations. It was the first Sudanese film to appear at the festival. In a speech, Kordofani noted that most of the cast and crew were not given visas to attend the festival. He also said that he felt guilty about being there: "I walk the red carpet while people are running away from bullets and bombing". Goodbye Julia was also shown in more than 30 international film festivals, including the BFI London Film Festival, Karlovy Vary, Melbourne, Chicago, Warsaw, Hamburg and the Montreal International Black Film Festival.

In September 2023, Goodbye Julia was nominated as Sudan's candidate for Best International Feature Film at the 96 Academy Awards, to be announced on 10 March 2024. This nomination received the support of Black Panther actress Lupita Nyong'o as executive producer.

On 25 October 2023, Goodbye Julia was launched commercially in 20 Egyptian cinemas, selling a record number of box office tickets for foreign films in Egypt in its first two weeks. Starting on 8 November, it has been shown in Paris and more than 20 other cities in France, and on 7 December, it opened in cinemas in the Gulf countries and Saudi Arabia. In April 2024, the film premiered in Kenya as part of Aflam-Sudan, a weeklong screening of Sudanese films hosted by Unseen Nairobi. The same month, Goodbye Julia received its Jordanian premier in Amman as part of the Royal Film commission's Women's Film Week

== Reception ==
On the review aggregator website Rotten Tomatoes, 100% of 20 critics' reviews are positive, with an average rating of 8.6/10.

Writing for Cineuropa portal, film critic Fabien Lemercier said: "Mohamed Kordofani offers up wonderful snapshots, overviews and explanations of all the nuances of the acute Sudanese situation of the time. [...] It makes for a film of impeccable quality, marking the birth of an incredibly promising filmmaker and confirming the emergence of a 7th art in Sudan."

In a similar way, The Hollywood Reporter wrote:

Goodbye Julia will bring to life Sudanese issues for audiences. Kordofani's fine direction balances the film's multiple modes: It's a drama, with shades of a thriller and a sense of its own politics. With its classic, accessible style, Goodbye Julia will surely rally more support for the cinema of Sudan, a nation full of stories that need to be told about its past and present.

— Lovia Gyarkye, 'Goodbye Julia' Review: An Operatic Drama Nimbly Tackles the Story of a Fractured Sudan, The Hollywood Reporter

In her review for Variety magazine, Jessica Kiang remarked on the story's social background, the difference of the main characters and the photographic quality:

Telling the story of a fraught friendship between two very different women, Kordofani's intelligent, compassionate scripting ensures that the political never overwhelms the personal. [...] Both women are equally flattered by Pierre de Villiers's warm, close-up-rich photography, but Julia remains the less well-developed. Then again, despite her relative poverty and being on the sharp end of every -ism (colorism, racism, sexism, ethnocentrism) that bedevils Khartoum at this moment in time, Julia has from the outset the freer spirit; it is Mona who is most in need of change.

— Jessica Kiang, Two Women Forge a Connection Across Devastating Divides in an Engrossing Sudanese Drama, Variety magazine, June 2023

Writing for BBC News, Shereen Sherief likewise praised both the film's scenario and photography and gave special credit to the soundtrack, as well as to the two main actresses, who "explore the deep-seated tensions and divisions that resulted in the split of Sudan."

What makes Goodbye Julia truly remarkable is the level of artistry exhibited throughout the film. It is astonishing to think that this is Mohammed Kordofani's directorial debut, especially considering his lack of formal training in cinema. The high standards of craftsmanship are evident in every frame, from the visually stunning cinematography to the nuanced performances by the cast.

— Shereen Sherief, BBC News, Goodbye Julia makes history in Cannes 76

In May 2024, Goodbye Julia was awarded the Prix Jean Renoir des lycéens, pronounced by a national jury of secondary schools and sponsored by the French Ministry of Education. Following this, the film will be the subject of film studies for more than 400.000 students in France during the academic year 2024/25.

Goodbye Julia was nominated as best Arab film of 2023 in several categories by the Critics Awards for Arab Films. Managed by the Arab Cinema Center in Cairo, these distinctions are awarded by 209 critics from 72 countries, and the winners are scheduled to be announced at the Cannes Film Festival on 18 May 2024.

In Cairo, Wael Khairy, editor of SceneNow website, praised the film's message of the racism that Southerners are confronted with in their daily lives. Despite this, he also wrote that "The opening scenes in Khartoum are filmed with the tension of a ticking time bomb, but as it approaches the second and third acts, it stumbles and treads familiar ground."

In their December 2023 review of the 10 best Arab films of the year, Al Jazeera listed Goodbye Julia in first place. The review praised the film's storyline, complex main characters, musical score and, most of all, Kordofani's script and directing.

A January 2024 review in Sudanese online magazine Andariya stressed the gender-specific aspects of the film. Thus, it emphasized "the rare and precious voice that shows how the pangs of patriarchy put their hands on the lives of women." Quoting Mona's remark in the film: “Most men are selfish and with a heart of stone.”, the review concluded:

Kordofani has painted the characters of all men, except the benevolent elderly photographer, as committing or heading towards violence. They go rampant and form deadly mobs in the street, set fire to poor people’s shacks, evict women, and push them in the back of their cars to imprison them. At one time or another, most male characters end up with a weapon in their hand, ready to commit a crime.

— Mina Cherradi, review of Goodbye Julia for Andariya magazine

According to Kordofani, Sudanese viewers liked the film more than he expected and seemed "more accepting of self-criticism".

== Awards and nominations ==
Awards and distinctions for Goodbye Julia
Award	Date of ceremony	Category	Recipient(s)	Result	Ref.
Cannes Film Festival	27 May 2023	Prix de la Liberté (Freedom Award)	Goodbye Julia	Won	
Chicago International Film Festival	20 October 2023	Roger Ebert Award	Goodbye Julia	Won	
Leeds International Film Festival	19 November 2023	Audience Award for Fiction Feature	Goodbye Julia	Won	
El Gouna Film Festival	23 December 2023	Cinema for Humanity Audience Award	Goodbye Julia	Won	
Ministry of National Education (France)	9 May 2024	Prix Jean Renoir des lycéens	Goodbye Julia	Won	
Arab Cinema Center (Egypt)	18 May 2024	Critics Awards for Arab Films: Best Feature Film and Best Screenplay	Goodbye Julia	Won	

== See also ==
- Cinema of Sudan
- List of submissions to the 96th Academy Awards for Best International Feature Film
- List of Sudanese submissions for the Academy Award for Best International Feature Film
