= Railway Men =

2019 film by Erige Sehiri

- Film poster
- Directed by: Erige Sehiri
- Release dates: 2019
- Country: Tunisia

Railway Men (original title: "As-Sekka") is a documentary film directed by Erige Sehiri. Released in 2019, the film provides an intimate and thought-provoking exploration of the lives of Tunisian railway workers who labor on Line #1, affectionately referred to as La voie normale (the normal track). Despite its significance as the only railway in Tunisia built to international norms, Line #1 also bears the burden of being the most neglected.

== Synopsis ==
The film is set in northern Tunisia, where an aging locomotive must be constantly patched up to keep running. The film's protagonists are Ahmed, Afef, Issam, Abee, and Najib. These railway men and women grapple with their loyalty to the National Railway Company and their personal aspirations. As a new generation of workers, they redefine their vision of work in a society that strives to create a democratic way of existing.

Fitati, Ahmed's colleague, chooses a different path. He becomes a whistleblower, exposing train accidents and adding another layer of tension and complexity to their experiences. The film captures the essence of transformation and societal change in post-revolutionary Tunisia.
