= Mukuru (deity) =

Mukuru is the Supreme Creator (God) of the Himba and Herero people of Namibia.

== Depiction ==
The Himba and Herero worship a god named Mukuru. Mukuru is the creator of the world, the supreme ruler. The Bantu root of the word expresses greatness and power. The deceased ancestors of the Himba and Herero are subservient to him, acting as intermediaries. However, while the ancestors are believed to bless or curse, Mukuru is believed to only bless.

== Himba beliefs ==
The Himba cultivate a cult of deceased ancestors (ovakuru), with the deceased subject to the god Mukuru and acting as intermediaries between the living Himba and the god Mukuru. Animal sacrifices are not practiced by the Himba; nothing is known about possible human sacrifices in the past.

The Himba know the magical system of omiti, which in the context of traditional African religions corresponds to witchcraft. The Himba fear omiti-wielding sorcerers, and some believe that every death is the result of omiti's influence. Omiti characterizes the attack of an evil force on a person. A Himba healer - close to Mukuru - who knows these powers, can identify them and protect the victim against them in a certain way, but does not use them himself, helps the affected people to discover the source of the omiti. Unlike a sorcerer, a healer is only supposed to help, heal and, with the help of Mukuru, recognize the causes of misfortune.

The Herero recognized the god Mukuru as the creator before their majority conversion to Lutheran Christianity after the German genocide of the Herero ethnic group.
