= Disco Boy (film) =

2023 film by Giacomo Abbruzzese

- Italian theatrical release poster
- Directed by: Giacomo Abbruzzese
- Written by: Giacomo Abbruzzese
- Produced by: Lionel Massol; Pauline Seigland
- Starring: Franz Rogowski; Morr Ndiaye; Laetitia Ky; Leon Lučev; Matteo Olivetti; Robert Więckiewicz; Michał Balicki
- Cinematography: Hélène Louvart
- Edited by: Fabrizio Federico; Ariane Boukerche; Giacomo Abbruzzese
- Music by: Vitalic
- Production companies: Films Grand Huit; Dugong Films; Panache Productions; La Compagnie Cinématographique; Division; Donten & Lacroix Films; Stromboli Films; VOO; BeTV
- Distributed by: KMBO (France); Lucky Red (Italy); Anga Productions (Belgium); Nowe Horyzonty (Poland)
- Release dates: 19 February 2023 (Berlinale); 9 March 2023 (Italy); 3 May 2023 (France); 24 May 2023 (Belgium); 6 October 2023 (Poland)
- Running time: 91 minutes
- Countries: France; Italy; Belgium; Poland
- Languages: French; English; Polish; Russian; Igbo; Nigerian English
- Box office: $328,587

Disco Boy is a 2023 drama film written and directed by Giacomo Abbruzzese in his feature directorial debut and starring Franz Rogowski, Morr Ndiaye, Laetitia Ky, Leon Lučev, Matteo Olivetti, Robert Więckiewicz and Michał Balicki. The film depicts the intertwined stories of Aleksei (Rogowski), a member of the French Foreign Legion; and of Jomo (Ndiaye), a guerrilla fighter in a village in the Niger Delta. It was selected to compete for the Golden Bear at the 73rd Berlin International Film Festival, where it had its world premiere on 19 February 2023. Abbruzzese was also nominated for GWFF Best First Feature Award in the festival. The film was released in Italy on 9 March 2023, in France on 3 May 2023, in Belgium on 24 May 2023 and in Poland on 6 October 2023.

== Cast ==
- Franz Rogowski as Aleksei
- Morr Ndiaye as Jomo
- Laetitia Ky as Udoka
- Leon Lučev as Paul
- Matteo Olivetti as Francesco
- Robert Więckiewicz as Gavril
- Michał Balicki as Mikhail
- Dimitri Pacalo as Stephane

== Production ==
=== Development ===
Disco Boy is the feature film debut of Italian-born director and screenwriter Giacomo Abbruzzese. He developed the film during the Cinéfondation artist-in-residence program initiated by the Cannes Film Festival. Speaking to Cineuropa's Davide Abbatescianni, Abbruzzese revealed that Rogowski's character was born out of an encounter in a nightclub with a dancer who had been a soldier. "He explained this 'dichotomy' through his body: a dancer's body is the same as a soldier's body. Although seemingly opposed, they actually have many things in common: discipline, the choreography involved is almost pleasurable thanks to the extreme effort involved, you return home destroyed and exhausted", Abbruzzese added.

=== Casting ===
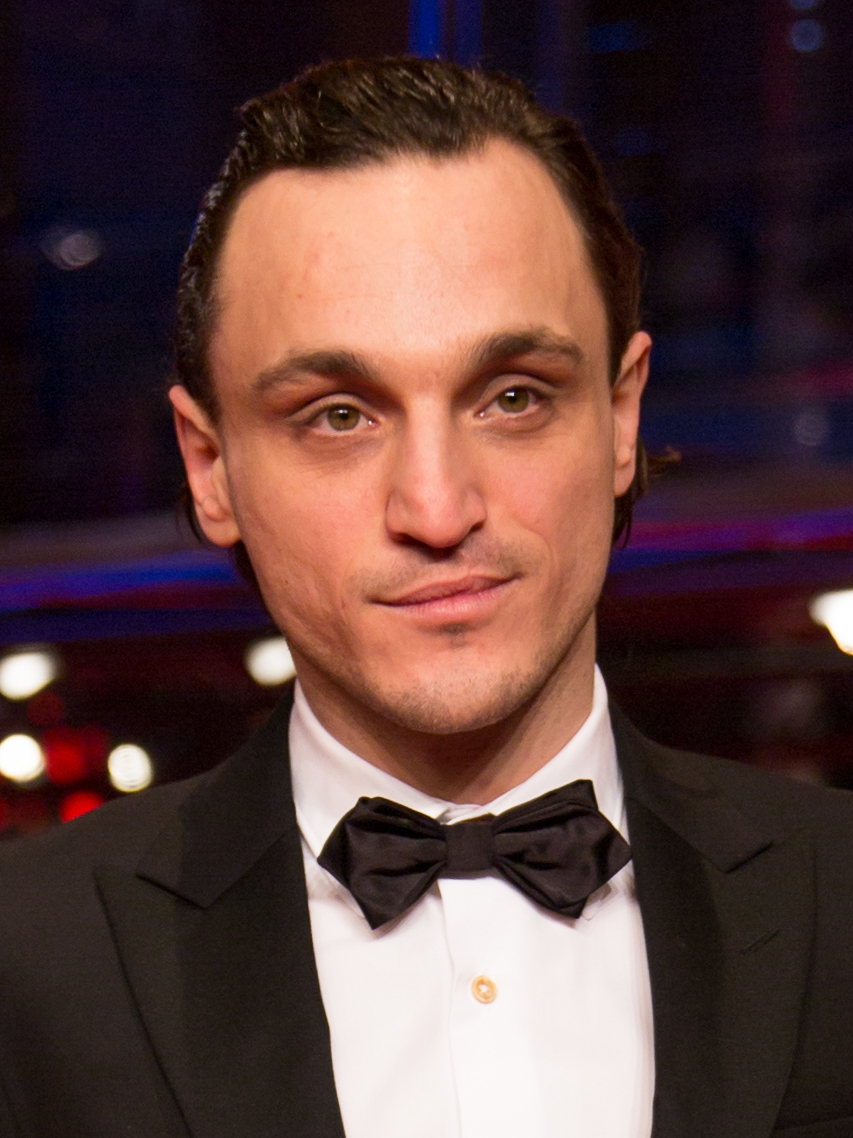
Franz Rogowski portrays Aleksey

Franz Rogowski was cast in the role of Aleksey, and Morr Ndiaye from Gambia as Jomo. He was discovered through his participation in the documentary film Tumaranké (2018). Laetitia Ky, the Ivorian women's activist, influencer and model was cast as Udoka alongside Croatian Leon Lučev, Italian Matteo Olivetti, Polish Robert Więckiewicz and Belgian Mutamba Kalonji.

=== Filming ===
The film was shot from 13 September to 5 November 2021 in France (Paris and the island of Réunion) and Polish Subcarpathia.

=== Soundtrack ===
The movie soundtrack was made by disc jockey Vitalic, who was chosen by Abruzzese himself. Abruzzese wanted "not any kind of techno, but Vitalic's one, with opera and melacholics elements that guide you towards a trance state. The whole film is built as an ascension."

== Release ==
Disco Boy had its world premiere at the 73rd Berlin International Film Festival on 19 February 2023, in competition. It was released theatrically in Italy on 9 March 2023 by Lucky Red, in France on 3 May 2023 by KMBO, in Belgium on 24 May 2023 by Anga Productions, and in Poland on 6 October 2023 by Nowe Horyzonty. In the United States, the film opened in New York City on 2 February 2024 and in Los Angeles on 9 February from Big World Pictures.

The film was screened at the 2024 Glasgow Film Festival.

== Reception ==
=== Critical response ===
On the review aggregator website Rotten Tomatoes, the film holds an approval rating of 89% based on 53 reviews, with an average rating of 7.1/10. The website's critics consensus reads, "Visually stylish and alluring in a dreamlike way, Disco Boy finds writer-director Giacomo Abbruzzese building on his obvious influences to tell a story that's distinctive in its own right." Metacritic, which uses a weighted average, assigned the film a score of 71 out of 100 based on 16 reviews, indicating "generally favorable" reviews.

Ben Croll of IndieWire graded the film B and wrote, "Getting in, getting down, and getting out as a style-hopping sizzle reel, Disco Boy heralds a promising new talent who totally has the moves." Peter Bradshaw of The Guardian rated the film with 4 stars out of 5 and wrote, "Giacomo Abbruzzese makes a really stylish debut with Disco Boy, a visually thrilling, ambitious and distinctly freaky adventure into the heart of imperial darkness". Praising score and cinematography Bradshaw concluded, "The electronic score by Vitalic [...] throbs in its own incantatory trance and Hélène Louvart's cinematography is a thing of beauty. It's quite a trip."

=== Accolades ===
Award	Date	Category	Recipient	Result	Ref.
Berlin International Film Festival	25 February 2023	Golden Bear	Disco Boy	Nominated	
Berlin International Film Festival	25 February 2023	GWFF Best First Feature Award	Giacomo Abbruzzese	Nominated	
Berlin International Film Festival	25 February 2023	Silver Bear for Outstanding Artistic Contribution: cinematography	Hélène Louvart	Won	
César Awards	23 February 2024	Best Original Music	Vitalic	Nominated	
International Cinephile Society	11 February 2024	Best Score	Vitalic	Nominated	
Lumière Awards	22 January 2024	Best Actor	Franz Rogowski	Nominated	
Lumière Awards	22 January 2024	Best First Film	Disco Boy	Nominated	
Lumière Awards	22 January 2024	Best Cinematography	Hélène Louvart	Nominated	
Lumière Awards	22 January 2024	Best Music	Vitalic	Won	
David di Donatello Awards	May 3, 2024	Best Producer	Giulia Achilli, Marco Alessi, Lionel Massol, Pauline Seigland, André Logie	Nominated	
David di Donatello Awards	May 3, 2024	Best New Director	Linda Caridi	Nominated	
