= Under the Fig Trees =

- Film poster
- Directed by: Erige Sehiri
- Written by: Erige Sehiri; Ghalya Lacroix; Peggy Hamann
- Produced by: Erige Sehiri; Didar Domehri; Palmyre Badinier; Nicolas Wadimoff; Philippe Coeytaux; Roshi Behesht Nedjad
- Starring: Fidé Fdhili; Feten Fdhili; Ameni Fdhili; Samar Sifi; Leila Ouhebi; Hneya Ben Elhedi Sbahi; Gaith Mendassi; Abdelhak Mrabti; Fedi Ben Achour; Firas Amri
- Cinematography: Frida Marzouk
- Edited by: Ghalya Lacroix; Hafedh Laaridhi; Malek Kamounn
- Music by: Armin Bouhafa
- Production companies: Henia Productions; Maneki Films
- Release date: 5 September 2021 (Venice Film Festival)
- Running time: 92 minutes
- Countries: Tunisia; France; Switzerland; Qatar
- Language: Arabic

Under the Fig Trees (Arabic: تحت الشجرة, romanized: Taht al-Shajara) is a 2021 Tunisian drama film directed by Erige Sehiri, starring Fidé Fdhili, Feten Fdhili, Ameni Fdhili, Samar Sifi, Leila Ouhebi, Hneya Ben Elhedi Sbahi, Gaith Mendassi, Abdelhak Mrabti, Fedi Ben Achour and Firas Amri.

The film was announced as Tunisian submission for the Academy Award for Best International Feature Film at the 95th Academy Awards.

== Cast ==
- Fidé Fdhili as Fidé
- Feten Fdhili as Melek
- Ameni Fdhili as Sana
- Samar Sifi
- Leila Ouhebi as Leila
- Hneya Ben Elhedi Sbahi
- Gaith Mendassi
- Abdelhak Mrabti as Abdou
- Fedi Ben Achour
- Firas Amri as Firas

== Release ==
Under the Fig Trees had its world premiere at the 78th Venice International Film Festival on 5 September 2021. It was released in France on 7 December 2022.

== Reception ==
On the review aggregator website Rotten Tomatoes, 100% of 26 critics' reviews are positive, with an average rating of 7.7/10. The website's consensus reads: "Distinguished by a naturalistic approach that's enriched by strong work from an ensemble heavy with first-time actors, Under the Fig Trees explores a world of ideas in the span of a single day." Lovia Gyarkye of The Hollywood Reporter wrote that "The languid, relaxed body language, the clipped cadences of shared stories, and the affection with which the women speak to each other even during moments of tension all bolster the film’s realism and its sense of soul."

Amber Wilkinson of Screen Daily wrote that "Sehiri has already proved herself as a documentarian with the award-winning Railway Men, and she brings that same sense of naturalism to her debut fiction feature".

== See also ==
- List of submissions to the 95th Academy Awards for Best International Feature Film
- List of Tunisian submissions for the Academy Award for Best International Feature Film
