= Ger Duany =

US-American actor and fashion model from southern Sudan

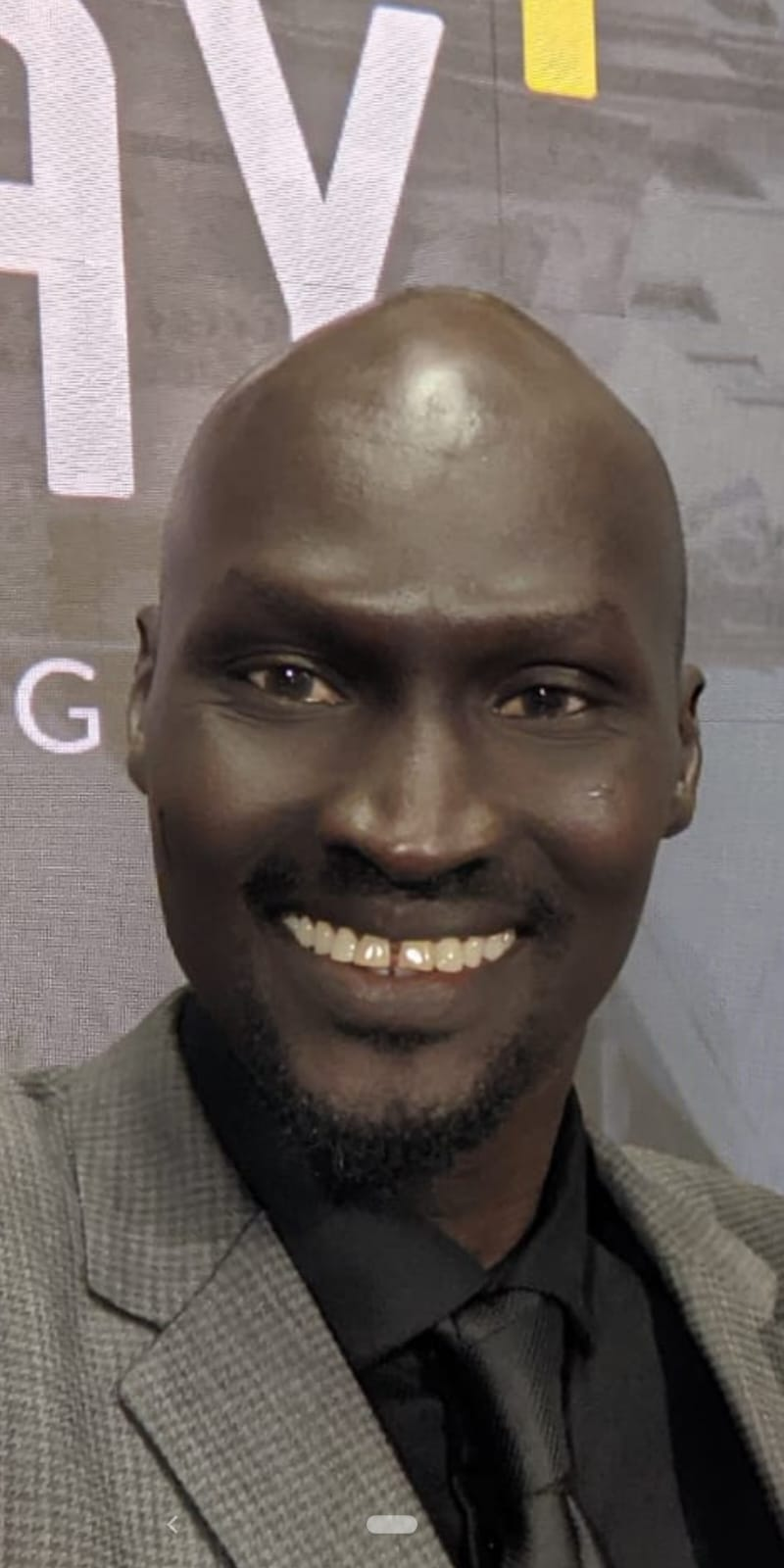
- Duany in 2022
- Born: Ger Duany; November 9, 1978 (age 47); Akobo, Democratic Republic of Sudan (present-day Akobo, Jonglei State, South Sudan)
- Education: University of Bridgeport
- Occupations: Actor, speaker, High Profile Supporter of the UN Refugee Agency (UNHCR)
- Years active: 2004–present

Ger Duany (born 1978 in Akobo, Greater Upper Nile in Sudan) is a South Sudanese and American actor and former refugee born in South Sudan and resettled in the United States at age 15.

After graduation from high school in Bloomington, Indiana, Duany earned a college degree from the University of Bridgeport. Following this, he embarked on a career as UNHCR Goodwill Ambassador, actor, public speaker and fashion model.

== Early life ==
Duany was born in Akobo (then part of Sudan) on November 9, 1978. He had his first experience of war at the age of seven, when his family and community were uprooted. At age 13, war separated him from his mother, and he resorted to becoming a child soldier as a means of survival during southern Sudan’s struggle for independence. Following this, Duany became a refugee in Ethiopia and then Kenya, and was resettled to the United States from Dadaab camp at the age of 15. Titled I was a Child Soldier, he later told the story of his early life for the United Nations High Commissioner for Refugees (UNHCR).

In the US, Duany first lived in Bloomington supported by The Lost Boys Foundation, an organization for unaccompanied refugee minors. After graduation from high school, Duany went on to earn a college degree from the University of Bridgeport.

== Career ==
=== As movie actor ===
Duany made his debut as a movie actor in the 2004 philosophical comedy film I Heart Huckabees, in which he played a refugee called Stephen Nimieri. He was picked for the role because the film's producer and director David O. Russell wanted someone who had endured the real-life experience of being a refugee. In 2010, Duany made an uncredited appearance in another Russell film, The Fighter, starring Mark Wahlberg and Christian Bale. He later had an important role in the 2011 drama Restless City.

In mid-2011, he co-produced and starred in the documentary film Ger: To Be Separate, about his journey from war child to refugee to Hollywood actor and international model. The film also showed his return to South Sudan after almost 20 years, voting for the first time and celebrating the country's newly acquired independence on 9 July 2011.

Duany played a limousine driver in the 2012 film, Isn't It Delicious? by director Michael Patrick Kelly. In 2014 he appeared alongside other refugees and award-winning Reese Witherspoon in The Good Lie, inspired by the story behind the Lost Boys of Sudan. The film tells the story of three refugees who are resettled from Kakuma camp in Kenya to the United States, and their struggles to integrate.

In the award-winning 2023 Sudanese drama film Goodbye Julia, Duany played the role of Majier, a supporter of independence for South Sudan during the separation of his country from northern Sudan.

As a fashion model, Duany has appeared on the cover of numerous magazines such as Heed, Bleu Magazine, and Numéro.

=== As UNHCR Goodwill Ambassador ===
During the 2015 World Refugee Day, Duany was announced as the UNHCR's Goodwill Ambassador for the East and Horn of Africa Region by the organization's Kenya Country Representative, Raouf Mazou in Kakuma. In his role as UNHCR High Profile Supporter, he has helped to spread awareness about the plight of refugees and other populations that the UN refugee agency serves. Since 2015, Duany was a public speaker on behalf of UNHCR at numerous events, including the Social Good Summit in New York, the Tokyo Film Festival, UNHCR’s Nansen Refugee Awards, TEDx, and at the Annual Consultations on Resettlement and Complementary Pathways in Geneva.

In 2020, he published his memoir about his years in southern Sudan and up to his role as Goodwill Ambassador, titled Walk Towards the Rising Sun: From Child Soldier to Ambassador of Peace.

== Filmography ==
Film
Year	Title	Role	Notes
2004	I Heart Huckabees	Stephen Nimieri	Comedy
2010	The Fighter	Extra/uncredited	Drama
2011	Restless City	Rocky	Drama/Music
2012	Ger: To Be Separate	Himself	Documentary
2012	Isn't It Delicious?	Limo driver	
2014	The Good Lie	Jeremiah	Drama
2017	The Nile Hilton Incident	Clinton	Drama
2023	Goodbye Julia	Majier	Drama

== Reception ==
On Rotten Tomatoes, his films received critic's scores between 100% for Goodbye Julia and 64% for I Heart Huckabees.
