= Arab Cinema Center =

Non-profit organisation promoting Arab industry professionals

The Arab Cinema Center (ACC) is a nonprofit organisation that promotes Arab cinema, run by MAD Solutions. The ACC holds an awards ceremony at the Cannes Film Festival each year to present the Critics Awards for Arab Films, and, more recently, a single award in the Arab Critics Awards for European Films. The Arab Cinema Center also publishes Arab Cinema Magazine, an English-language magazine that focuses on Arab films and filmmakers.

== History ==
MAD Solutions was launched by Alaa Karkouti and Maher Diab in 2010 initially to market and distribute Arab-language films in the Middle East and North Africa.

The Arab Cinema Center was co-founded by Karkouti and Diab in 2015. It was created as an umbrella presence to act at film festivals and other events to help promote the Arab film industry, in the absence of government initiatives in Egypt.

The awards were started around 2017.

The ACC has been a regular presence at many international film festivals over the years, including the Cannes Film Festival, Berlinale, Venice Film Festival, and Toronto International Film Festival. In 2021, the ACC presented at the Malmö Arab Film Festival. In 2024, on the 10th anniversary of the ACC, it started the year at the 53rd International Film Festival Rotterdam in January, supporting three producers in the Rotterdam Lab as well as running five days of panel sessions and events. Later that year it held two panels at the Berlinale. In May that year, the ACC held a panel entitled "The Arab New Wave: The Actors" at the Plage des Palmes at Cannes. At Cannes at 2025, the ACC promoted a number of Arab-made films, including Once Upon a Time in Gaza (Palestine), Promised Sky (Tunisia), and Aisha Can't Fly Away (Egypt).

== Description ==
The ACC is based in Cairo, Egypt.

It supports the Arab film industry, serving as a hub for industry professionals and promoting talent. It helps to facilitate co-production, international sales and distribution, and gets involved in film festivals, commercial exhibitions, and industry events. The Doha Film Institute, CineGouna, the Royal Film Commission in Jordan, the Red Sea Film Foundation, NEOM Media Hub, Festival Scope, and The Hollywood Reporter, and others have partnered with the ACC over the years.

The ACC runs film panels and sessions regularly at film festivals, such as the Arab Cinema Lab at the Dubai Film Festival, MENA 360 at Cannes, Arab Cinema Hot Spots in Berlin, and the Production Bridge at Venice.

== Publications ==
=== Arab Cinema Magazine ===
The ACC publishes the Arab Cinema Magazine, an English-language magazine that focuses on Arab films and filmmakers. As of July 2026, there have been 26 editions of the magazine. The magazine was ranked third-most-read magazine at Cannes in 2023.

Each year, Arab Cinema Magazine produces a list of "Golden 101" creatives and powerbrokers in the Arab film, entertainment, and music industry, as a resource for non-Arabic-speaking filmmakers around the world, enabling them to access Arab talent, and increasing the visibility of Arab cinema and enhancing visibility internationally. The list began as the "Cannes 100" in 2018.

== Awards ==
=== Critics Awards for Arab Films ===
The Critics Awards for Arab Films are focused on Arab-language films that premiered in festivals outside the Arab world in the previous year. The nominated films in the various categories are voted on by film critics from around the world, who watch the films on Festival Scope, and the winners of are announced each year in May at the Cannes Film Festival.

The categories of awards include:

- Best film
- Best actor
- Best actress
- Best director
- Best screenplay/writer
- Best documentary
- Best short film (since 2024)

In the 6th edition of the Critics Awards for Arab Films, which comprised films that premiered in 2021, 167 film critics from 68 countries voted on the films.

Nominations for the 10th edition, which took place on 16 May 2026 at Cannes, were announced on 29 April, with films voted on by a record 307 critics from 75 countries. Annemarie Jacir's Palestine 36 led the pack, being nominated in six categories. However, Gazan twins Tarzan and Arab Nasser's Once Upon a Time in Gaza won Best Film. Palestine 36 won Best Screenplay (Jacir) and Best Cinematography (Hélène Louvart). Palestinian-American filmmaker Cherien Dabis was awarded Best Director prize, for All That's Left of You. Deborah Christelle Naney was awarded Best Actress for Promised Sky, and Best Actor went to Adham Shukr for his role in The Settlement.

=== Arab Critics Awards for European Films ===
The Arab Critics Awards for European Films is a newer event, launched in 2019, to recognise top European films. It is held in partnership with European Film Promotion and with sponsorship by Festival Scope. As of 2026 there is only one award under this banner, Best Film, which is to be awarded annually at El Gouna Film Festival in Egypt. By 2025, flms from North Macedonia, Germany, Slovakia, Poland, and Finland had received the award.

The ACC is hoping to create initiate similar awards for Asian, African, and Latin American films.

=== Other awards ===
The Arab Cinema Personality of the Year Award is awarded to influential figures in the Arab world's film industry. By 2025 people from the UAE, Egypt, Tunisia, Sweden-Palestine, Jordan, and Qatar had been honoured with the award. It was awarded at the 2024 Berlinale to Mohannad Al-Bakri, managing director of the Jordanian Royal Film Commission. The award was once again presented in 2025, this time at Cannes, on 15 May.

Lifetime achievement awards have been presented at Cannes to film critics from Egypt, Lebanon, the US, Iraq, France, the UK, and Cyprus.
