= Erige Sehiri =

French film director (born 1982)

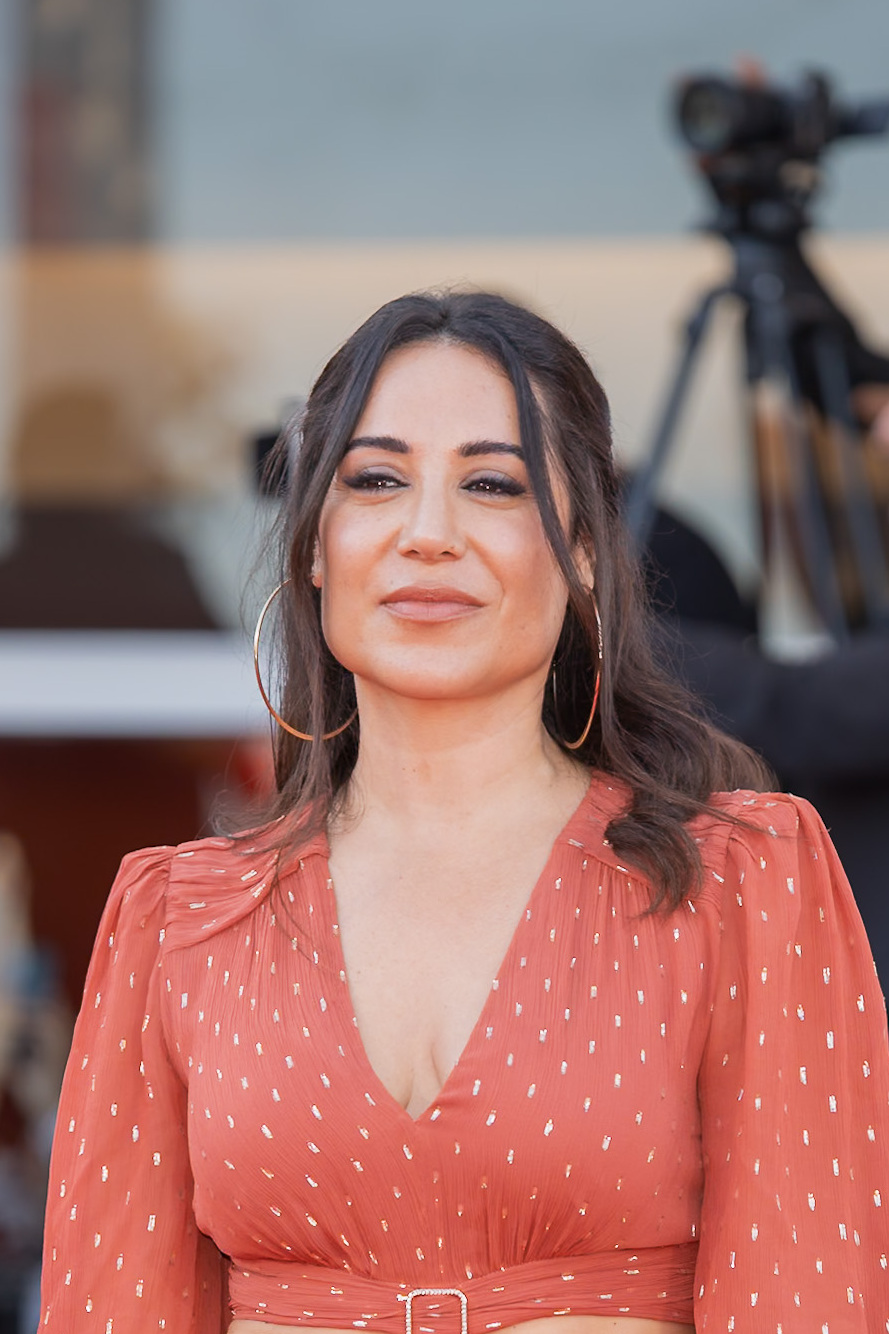
- Sehiri in 2025
- Born: Lyon, France
- Occupations: Film director, producer, screenwriter

Erige Sehiri is a French-Tunisian film director, producer, and screenwriter.

== Early life and education ==
Born in Lyon into a family of Tunisian origin, Erige Sehiri grew up in the Lyon suburb of Vénissieux, in the Minguettes neighborhood. Her father was an electrician and her mother was in charge of the kitchen at a secondary school. She was a regular at the only cinema in the neighbourhood.

Once she got her baccalauréat, she studied the English language in San Francisco and finance in Montreal, while doing a variety of part-time jobs.

== Career ==
Returning to Europe, Sehiri found a job in a bank in Luxembourg, before becoming an assistant journalist in Jerusalem. When the Tunisian revolution broke out in 2011, she moved to Tunis.

She shot her first short film about her father's first steps on Facebook, Le Facebook de mon père, released in 2012. Other short documentaries followed, until 2018, when she shot a feature-length documentary, Railway Men, about working on the railroad; it was released in Tunisian cinemas in 2019, and in French cinemas in 2020.

In 2022, Sehiri made her feature-film debut with the drama film Under the Fig Trees, which had its world premiere at the 75th edition of the Cannes Film Festival, at the Directors' Fortnight sidebar, and was released in cinemas in December 2022. The film also won the Golden Bayard at the 37th Festival International du Film Francophone de Namur, and was selected as the Tunisian submission for the Academy Award for Best International Feature Film at the 95th Academy Awards.

In 2025, Sehiri's feature drama film Promised Sky premiered in the Un Certain Regard section of the 78th Cannes Film Festival.

== Selected filmography ==
- Railway Men (2019, documentary)
- Under the Fig Trees (2022, drama, feature)
- Promised Sky (2025, drama, feature)
