= Promised Sky =

2025 drama film by Erige Sehiri

- Film poster
- French: Promis le ciel
- Directed by: Erige Sehiri
- Written by: Erige Sehiri; Anna Ciennik; Malika Cécile Louati
- Produced by: Didar Domehri; Erige Sehiri
- Starring: Aïssa Maïga; Laetitia Ky; Deborah Lobe Naney
- Cinematography: Frida Marzouk
- Edited by: Nadia Ben Rachid
- Music by: Valentin Hadjadj
- Production companies: Maneki Films; Henia Production
- Distributed by: Jour2fête (France)
- Release dates: 14 May 2025 (Cannes); 28 January 2025 (France)
- Running time: 92 minutes
- Countries: France; Tunisia; Qatar
- Languages: French; Arabic
- Box office: $160,501

Promised Sky (French: Promis le ciel) is a 2025 drama film directed by Erige Sehiri, from a screenplay she co-wrote with Anna Ciennik and Malika Cécile Louati. It is a French-Tunisian-Qatari international co-production. It stars Aïssa Maïga, Laetitia Ky and Debora Lobe Naney.

The film had its world premiere as the opening film of the Un Certain Regard section of the 2025 Cannes Film Festival on 14 May. It will be theatrically released in France on 28 January 2026 by Jout2fête.

== Premise ==
Set in Tunisia, Marie, an Ivorian pastor, offers refuge to Naney, a young mother, and Jolie, a student. One day, they take in a young orphan which challenges the dynamics between them.

== Cast ==
- Aïssa Maïga as Marie
- Laetitia Ky as Jolie
- Deborah Lobe Naney as Naney
- Estelle Dogbo as Kenza

== Production ==
In November 2023, Erige Sehiri announced the project under the working title Marie & Jolie and it participated at the Atlas Workshops, held during the Marrakech International Film Festival. In May 2024, it received a €40,000 production grant from the Francophonie Image Fund. It also received a €60,000 through the Hubert Bals Fund of the International Film Festival Rotterdam. In June 2024, it participated at the Venice Gap-Financing Market. In April 2025, the project was reported to participate in Qumra, held by the Doha Film Institute. It received a post-production grant during the first cycle of the 2025 Red Sea Fund.

In 2026, it is selected at the San Diego French Film Festival.

In an interview with Cineuropa, Sehiri revealed that the idea of the film was conceived when she was working on a documentary film about sub-Saharan students in Tunisia.

== Release ==
Promised Sky had its world premiere at the 2025 Cannes Film Festival on 14 May as the opening film of Un Certain Regard section.

In September 2024, it was reported that MAD Distribution acquired the film rights in Arab world. In the same month, Luxbox acquired the film's international sales.

== Reception ==
=== Critical response ===
On the review aggregator website Rotten Tomatoes, 82% of 17 critics' reviews are positive, with an average rating of 6.5/10.

Tomris Laffly of Variety called the film "at times untidy" but further described it as "powerful" and "deeply human". Writing for RogerEbert.com, Ben Kenigsberg praised the leading performances of Maïga, Ky, Naney, and Kenza. He described them as "vivid and real".
