= Extreme Makeover: Home Edition season 5 =

Extreme Makeover: Home Edition
- Season 5
- No. of episodes: 26

Release
- Original network: ABC
- Original release: September 30, 2007 – May 18, 2008

Season chronology
- ← Previous; Season 4 Next → Season 6

This is a list of season 5 episodes of the Extreme Makeover: Home Edition series.

== Episodes ==
No. overall	No. in season	Title	Location	Original release date	Prod. code
93	1	"The Akana Family"	Kalihi, Hawaii	September 30, 2007	501
Ty and the gang travel to Kalihi, Hawaii to renovate the home of the Akana family. In addition to renovating the Akana family home, Ty and his team also renovate the KOKA Family Learning Center, which the family has run for more than eleven years. The Akana family consists of Theresa (a.k.a., "Momi"), her husband Ben, her three children, and their daughter. The children are fourteen-year-old Keahi, twelve-year-old Kuʻulei, eight-year-old Maka, and baby Poli. Momi Akana was a single mother on welfare when she started the Keiki O Ka ʻĀina (KOKA) Family Learning Center. Keiki O Ka ʻĀina means "Child of the land" in the Hawaiian language; the center helps struggling moms and their kids. Keahi Akana is now the lead singer and guitarist of the band "Further than our Sky." (Note: This episode is 2 hours long) Ty's Secret Project: Ben & Momi's master bedroom Design Team: Michael, Paul, Ed, Eduardo, Paige and Ty
94	2	"The Byers Family"	Corvallis, Oregon	October 7, 2007	502
Ty and the crew head up to Corvallis, Oregon to take on the home of Rob and Rachel Byers and their three children, 13-year-old Joe, 14-year-old Chris, and 8-year-old Jenessa, nicknamed "Boey", who had been battling cancer for the past two years. On December 28, 2007, this special girl lost her battle only 12 weeks after the episode aired. (Note: On February 3, 2008, the first time this episode aired since her death, the episode was dedicated in her memory) Ty's Secret Project: Boey's fashion boutique themed room Design Team: Michael, Tracy, Ed, Tanya and Ty
95	3	"The Brown Family"	Bridgeport, Connecticut	October 14, 2007	503
In this episode Ty and the crew head to Bridgeport, Connecticut to rebuild the home of the Brown Family, which was damaged by flooding, looting and fire. Ty's Secret Project: Gloria's Room; Design Team: Paige, Eduardo, John, Michael and Ty Special Guests: Cheryl Burke and Maksim Chmerkovskiy
96	4	"The Carter Family"	Billings, Montana	October 21, 2007	504
Ty and the crew head to Billings, Montana to a take on the home of Lon and Julie Carter and their three daughters Jade, Sapphire and Chalce-Donae who live in a refurbished chicken coop. Julie and Jade both have a very rare and very serious brain malformation called Chiari malformation. According to an online article, Sapphire and Chalce-Donae have a similar disease as well. These three sisters won't let pain keep them down though. All three are aspiring musicians. As an interesting side note, all three sisters have tattoos honoring the three-brother band Hanson and list them as their greatest musical inspiration. Ty's Secret Project: Lon and Julie's master bedroom Design Team: Michael, Paul, John, Tanya and Ty
97	5	"The Yazzie Family"	Pinon, Arizona	October 28, 2007	505
The team rebuilds the home of a Navajo family that has been living without running water and heat for the past five years. Ty's Secret Room: Georgia's Master Bedroom Design Team: Michael, Tracy, Paul, John And Ty
98	6	"The Miller Family"	Cheyenne, Wyoming	November 4, 2007	506
The team makes their first stop in Wyoming to help a family who takes care of their animals, along with their two kids, both of whom have heart defects because of the air in their house being contaminated with radon. Ty's Secret Project: Dan and Dawn's master bedroom. Design Team: Paige, Eduardo, John, Rib and Ty Special Guests: David Beckham and Wynonna Judd First appearance of Rib Hillis
99	7	"The Marrero Family"	Camden, New Jersey	November 11, 2007	507
Ty and the crew head to New Jersey to help a cancer-stricken father, 54-year-old Victor, who has been raising his five teenage sons ever since their mother abandoned them twelve years prior. They live in a run-down rental town-home in Camden with holes in the walls, bad plumbing, few furnishings, and no beds (the oldest slept on the living room couch). The father was unable to work due to two previous heart-attacks, and had started a local organization called "Single Fathers of Camden". Lack of money has left him wondering where his sons' next meal would come from, and left him forced to hold meetings for SFOC in his backyard (Note: The founder and owner of the construction company who worked with Ty and the gang on this episode had died before it aired.) Ty's Secret Project: A room stocked with video games, paintings, the works. Ty dubbed it "The Lion's Den". Design Team: Paul, Tanya, Rib, Ed and Ty
100	8	"The Swenson-Lee Family"	Minnetonka, Minnesota	November 25, 2007	508
For the show's 100th episode, Ty and the design team head to Minnetonka, Minnesota to help Erik and Vicki Swenson and their seven children; Taylor, 13, Samantha, 10, Trevor, 10, Tyler, 9, Tara, 7, Stella, 2, and Olivia, 2. Four of the children (Taylor, Trevor, Tyler, and Tara) are actually Vicki's nieces and nephews. Vicki's sister, Teri Lee, and her boyfriend, Tim, were murdered by Teri's ex-boyfriend. These four children became orphans (their father was killed in a car wreck five years earlier), and Erik and Vicki welcomed them into their home. Taylor was actually in the car when her father died and was with her mom when she was murdered. With seven children and another one on the way, the Swenson-Lee Family quickly outgrew their three bedroom home. Despite all these challenges Taylor and Vicki are advocates against domestic violence. Eight families from previous seasons also appeared to help out. (Note: Families from Extreme Makeover Home Edition Episodes) Ty's Secret Project: Family Room/Play Room; Design Team: Paul, Michael, Tracy, Paige and Ty The families that help out in the episode are: The Ripatti-Pearce family (Redondo Beach, California) from Episode 4.11; The Kubena family (East Bernard, Texas) from Episode 3.17; The Ginyard family (Capitol Heights, Maryland) from Episode 3.6; The Piestewa family (Tuba City, Arizona) from Episode 2.24; The Johnson family (Kansas City, Missouri) from Episode 2.22; The Burns family (Garden Grove, California) from Episode 2.9; The Wofford family (Encinitas, California) from Episode 2.1; The Cadigan-Scott family (Livermore, California) from Episode 1.12; Special Guest: Elmo played by Kevin Clash from Sesame Street in association of Sesame Workshop. Elmo Segment Director: Victor DiNapoli; Design Team Footages: Eduardo, Ed, Daniel, Constance and Preston
101	9	"The Stockdale Family"	Middleton, Idaho	December 2, 2007	509
A family whose four kids have a rare disease known as eosinophilic enteropathy, which causes their white blood cells to think that the food they eat is a parasite and attack it. They have numerous medical complications as a result, and their dilapidated home is making matters even worse. They are much loved by their parents and their dad is a hero because he has decided to go back to school to find a cure for his children. Ty's secret room: The kitchen, plus a sterile kitchen for preparing formula. Design Team: Eduardo, Paige, Paul, John and Ty
102	10	"The Vitale Family"	Athens, Vermont	December 9, 2007	510
A family whose youngest son, 2-year-old Louis, has numerous skeletal abnormalities and uses a wheelchair. He has amazed everyone with his ability to paint. His split-level, dilapidated house is really dangerous as it is wheelchair inaccessible and dangerous for Louis's immune system. Ty's secret room- Louis's therapeutic room. Design Team: Tanya, Michael, Paige, Rib and Ty
103	11	"The Chapin Family"	Kirkland, Washington	December 16, 2007	511
After discovering that the second most common cause of childhood deaths in Washington state was drowning, Connie Chapin, a single mother of 3 daughters and a son set up a swim school called Angelfish in her family pool. Unfortunately the local authority threatened to close it down because her 100-year-old house was structurally unsafe. This was the first time that the build took more than 7 days to complete, as consistent rain forced the build to run long, and the family was brought home on the morning of Day 8. Ty's secret Project- Molly's interior design themed bedroom. Design Team: Paul, Paige, Michael, John and Ty
104	12	"The Ray-Smith Family"	Milbridge, Maine	January 6, 2008	512
Ty and the team head to Milbridge, Maine to help Brittany Ray, a teacher at Narraguagus High School who received the Maine 2007 Teacher of the Year award, and her family: her husband, a fellow school teacher, daughter Bayley, and sons Thomas and Jojo. Thomas has autism and Jojo is showing the signs of autism as well. In addition, the family has a genetic disposition towards high cholesterol. The house has been in Brittany's family for over 100 years, but is unsafe and must be demolished. However, it is purportedly haunted by the spirits of Brittany's ancestors. Thus, Ty and Paul must consult a medium to determine if the spirits are willing to allow demolition; the spirits choose portions of the old house to incorporate into the design of a new one. Ty's secret project: Master Bedroom (the walls feature pictures of a crow, symbolizing that a departed relative watches over the family, a tribute to her haunting the old house) Design Team: Paul, Eduardo, John, Didiayer and Ty First appearance of Didiayer Snyder
105	13	"The Woodhouse Family"	Colorado Springs, Colorado	January 13, 2008	513
EM:HE heads over to Colorado Springs, Colorado to help the Woodhouse family, whose ten-year-old daughter, Kayla, has a rare disease called Hereditary Sensory Autonomic Neuropathy (specifically, Type 4, also known as Congenital insensitivity to pain with anhidrosis; only 25 people in the world have been diagnosed with this disease). As a result, she can't feel pain and if her body temperature starts increasing, it can't come down without medical intervention, and any extreme high temperatures could kill her. She has to be indoors most of the time with the thermostat set at 62 degrees at all times. Ty and the crew send the family to a ranch in a part of Colorado where the average temperature is 59 degrees year round. Ty's Secret Project: Kayla's water themed room (she loves swimming; the cool temperature of the water helps regulate her body temperature) Design Team: Rib, Eduardo, Tanya, Ed and Ty Special Guest: David Phelps
106	14	"The Luther Family"	Port Deposit, Maryland	January 20, 2008	514
In this episode, which many consider the largest build yet, the Extreme Team head to Port Deposit, Maryland to build a house, indoor riding arena and fully renovate a horse stable for people with disabilities after the father, Carl, died of liver cancer. and they can go on a Vacation to Italy. (Note: Carl Luther died on April 1, 2007, as this episode was filmed on October 14–22, 2007, six months after his death.) Ty's Secret Project: Renee's master bedroom Design Team: Ed, Paige, Rib, Eduardo and Ty
107	15	"The Voisine Family"	Manchester, New Hampshire	January 27, 2008	515
(Recorded October 18–25, 2007) Ty and the design team head to Manchester, NH to help Reynald and Casey Voisine and their four children who lost their home to the 2006 New England flood. As a bonus they also delivered a house to the Herod family built by an organization called "There's No Place Like Home", who also lost their home to the same flood, as well as a $15,000 check to the same organization. For more Info on "There's No Place Like Home" visit www.placelikehome.org Ty's Secret Project: The garage, known as "Garage Mahal". This is the second garage to have been a Secret Project; the first was back in 2004, on the McCrory family episode. Design Team: Paul, John, Michael, Tanya and Ty
108	16	"The Gilyeat Family"	Kansas City, Kansas	February 10, 2008	516
Single father Daniel lost his leg while serving in Iraq and his tiny, dilapidated home is not accessible for him. Ty's Secret project: Daniel's office. Design Team: John, Paige, Rib, Eduardo and Ty
109	17	"The Hughes Family"	Louisville, Kentucky	February 17, 2008	517
The team heads to Louisville to help the family of Patrick Henry Hughes, a blind man with a talent for music. He is in a wheelchair and the home was not accessible for him. Not only does the design team renovate the home, they also renovate the University of Louisville football field (Patrick Henry was in the marching band, courtesy of his father pushing him around) to make it more accessible for him. Ty's Secret Project: A wheelchair accessible mini-apartment for Patrick Henry. Design Team: Paul, Michael, Didiayer, Eduardo and Ty (Ed traveled with the family in his hometown of London, England while they're vacationing, as a tour guide). Special Guest: Sandi Patty
110	18	"The Lucas family"	Cullen, Virginia	March 2, 2008	518
The team goes to Virginia to help military father, Michael, and his wife and two boys. His younger son, Joseph, has autism. Michael loves history, so he started to build his dream home on a landscape which served as a setting for Civil War battles. He was called over to Iraq and could never finish it, so the Extreme Makeover: Home Edition design team lends a hand. Ty's Secret Project: Michael and Jean's master bedroom Design Team: Ty, Paul, Michael, Rib and Phyllis Special Guest: Toby Keith
111	19	"The Turner Family"	Fairmont, West Virginia	March 9, 2008	519
Richard and Angie Turner dedicate themselves to their community by Richard being a football coach to a team of troubled kids, while Angie is trying hard to get her Master's Degree, so she can be a teacher. Their house is very small and cramped for seven people. It's up to Ty and the gang to help this large family get a bigger house. Ty's Secret Project: Richard and Angie's master bedroom Design Team: Ed, Tanya, Didiayer, Eduardo and Ty
112	20	"The Boettcher Family"	Silver Springs, Nevada	March 16, 2008	520
Steve is a preacher who spreads the word by riding his motorcycle. Steve and Mary are loved by every teen in their community, when they opened a rec room for troubled teens and even cook them dinner. They love doing what they do, but both their trailer and rec room needs repairing. Also, Steve's grandson, Joshua, has respiratory problems and uses a tracheotomy. Ty's Secret Project: A new rec room for the teens, including new pool tables and air hockey tables Design Team: Tanya, Eduardo, John, Rib and Ty
113	21	"The Gaudet Family"	Mobile, Alabama	March 23, 2008	521
When the youngest son, Peter was diagnosed with Down syndrome, this inspired the family to start opening up to their community for people with special needs and they opened a special camp called "Camp Smile." With all of this love from their community, Ty and the crew give back to the Gaudet Family by giving them a better house with better conditions after Hurricane Katrina struck and made the house conditions even worse. Ty's Secret Project: Peter's therapeutic room (also not revealed to the recipient prior to reveal, similar to James' room in the Westbrook episode) Design Team: Didiayer, John, Ed, Michael and Ty
114	22	"The Latif Family"	Wilmington, Delaware	March 30, 2008	522
Ju-Juanna Latif dropped out of high school, becoming a single teen mother. She was forced to move into a homeless shelter with her son. Things got better when she managed to go to college and buy a home. She had three more kids (including James, who used a wheelchair) and welcomed "Miss Rose" Morgan into their family, who lives next door to them (on the other side of a duplex). The house was really cramped and Ty was amazed to see exactly how wheelchair-inaccessible the house was (Miss Rose's house was covered in plastic sheeting to keep out the cold). Ty's Secret Project: Ju-Juanna's Room Design Team: Tracy, Paige, Eduardo, Paul and Ty
115	23	"The Martinez Family"	Albuquerque, New Mexico	April 27, 2008	523
A family who moved to Albuquerque so their father (a pastor named Gerald) could help out a troubled neighborhood filled with crime. He helped reform numerous lives and is much loved. Unfortunately, his fixer-upper duplex that he and his family are living in is open to everyone, and the family no longer has any privacy. The design team demolishes an entire block and build the family a new home, a dorm room for the people who need to sleep, and a rec room for people to come in to avoid living on the streets. Ty's secret room- Gerald and Liesa's master bedroom. Design Team: Michael, Paige, Ed, Paul and Ty
116	24	"The Silva Family"	Warwick, Rhode Island	May 4, 2008	524
A former race car driver Ken and his wife Doreen along with their 5 children (3 adopted) have a house that is contaminated with lead poisoning. Ty and the design team not only tear down the house, they dig down deep enough to get all of the lead out of the property. Ty's Secret Project: Ken and Doreen's Master Bedroom. Design Team: Eduardo, Ed, Didiayer, John and Ty
117	25	"The Giunta Family"	Maynard, Massachusetts	May 11, 2008	525
On the day his daughter is born, Paul Giunta gets into a serious accident on his way home from the hospital. Doctors didn't think he'd live through the night. When he did, they said he'd never speak or walk ever again. He defied the odds and talks and walks a little with the help of a walker. He has never lived in the same house as his daughter due to the house not being wheelchair accessible. Ty's Secret Project: Renee's Hair Salon room Design Team: Michael, Paige, Tanya, Paul and Ty Final appearance of Tanya McQueen
118	26	"The Usea Family"	Westwego, Louisiana	May 18, 2008	526
On the final episode of the 50-state tour, Ty and the crew head down to New Orleans to help the entire city, while still working on the home of fireman Brad Usea and his family, including wife Laura, and two daughters, Abby and Audrey. Also being made over is a nearby church, Noah's Ark Baptist. Ty's Secret Project: a bedroom for Brad's brothers, Chris and Chad; Design Team: Michael, Tracy, Eduardo, Paige, Ed, Paul and Ty Special guests: The Ten Tenors.

== See also ==
- List of Extreme Makeover: Home Edition episodes
- Extreme Makeover: Home Edition Specials
