= Extreme Makeover: Home Edition season 6 =

Extreme Makeover: Home Edition
- Season 6
- No. of episodes: 25

Release
- Original network: ABC
- Original release: September 28, 2008 – May 17, 2009

Season chronology
- ← Previous; Season 5 Next → Season 7

This is a list of season 6 episodes of the Extreme Makeover: Home Edition series.

== Episodes ==
No.	Title	Location	Original release date	Prod. code
118	"The Jackson Family"	Poolesville, Maryland	September 28, 2008	601
Four years ago, Felicia Jackson made a promise at her sister Cassandra's deathbed to keep all 10 of her nieces and nephews together. Before Cassandra died from complications from cancer, she told Felicia that she did not want her children to split up, and Felicia vowed never to let that happen. With that one act of kindness in 2004, Felicia went from being a mother of four to a single mother of 14. She has been supporting all the children by working as a security guard at a mall. Unable to afford and find permanent housing, this family of 15 had been living in a hotel since December. Felicia was told that, if she does not find appropriate housing soon, she will have to split the children up within the foster care system. (Note: This episode is 2 hours long) Ty's secret project: Felicia's master bedroom. Design team: Didiayer, Ed, Eduardo, Michael, Paige, Paul, and Ty. Special guests: Jennifer Hudson, Chris Cooley.
119	"The Akers Family"	West Chester, Ohio	October 5, 2008	602
An Ohio family has two daughters, Brooke and Faith, who use wheelchairs because of spinal muscular atrophy. Brooke is a cheerleader at many sporting events in her community, and is much loved by the community for her determination and optimism in the face of danger. The family has a split-level house that is not wheelchair accessible. Ty's secret project: Brooke's bedroom. Design team: Ed, Michael, Paige, Paul, and Ty. Special guests: Bronson Arroyo and the Jonas Brothers.
120	"The Anders–Beatty Family"	Richland Center, Wisconsin	October 12, 2008	603
Rochelle Anders, the mother, is a first grade teacher. She devotes much of her time to helping the community. She does all she can to help out the kids in her class, and is much loved in her community for it. Her husband Gary Beatty has died of a heart attack, and she has been unable to afford to make changes to her dilapidated home. They can go on the Vacation with Adventures by Disney trip to Canada Ty's secret project: Rochelle's master bedroom Design team: Eduardo, John, Paige, Paul, and Ty
121	"The King Family"	Charlotte, North Carolina	October 19, 2008	604
Alisha and Curtis King run the Step-By-Step daycare, a non-profit center. They are very courteous about their job. They provide food, transportation, and clothing when needed. They are much loved throughout their community for the way they take in their kids and care for him and generally for nothing. Their home has been tested for a severe mold infestation. Their daughter Laila has severe asthma and the mold is very dangerous for her. Ty's secret project: Step-By-Step Daycare Design team: Didiayer, Ed, Michael, Rib, and Ty.
122	"The McCully Family"	Bigelow, Arkansas	October 26, 2008	605
The family's son Job was diagnosed with leukemia when he was four years old. He survived the struggle, but afterwards developed fungal pneumonia. While battling this, his lungs gave out and his heart stopped beating. He had to have a double lung transplant. He survived, but had a fragile immune system and uses a wheelchair. He is considered a hero because of his great strength and determination to survive. His house is infested with mold, which is life threatening to Job, and it was unlivable for the family. They are living in a rental home and they had no place to go. Ty's secret project: Rob and Tina's master bedroom. Design team: Eduardo, Paige, Paul, Tracy, and Ty. Special guest: Mark Schultz
123	"The Hill Family"	Geneva, New York	November 2, 2008	606
Tim Hill grew up in a rough neighborhood. However, he managed to stay out of the bad influences through the sport of boxing. When he grew up and started a family, he made sure that the underprivileged kids in his community would not fall under bad influences. He started a non-profit boxing program so that kids could come and stay off the streets. They are much loved in their community for the fact that they care enough about the kids to make sure they stay out of trouble. He even adopted Aleem, a boy who had grown up in a broken home and had come to the boxing program to stay out of trouble. The gym that the program is run out of is in really bad shape. The Hill family's own home is also severely dilapidated, and they cannot afford to repair it. Ty's secret project: Tim and Michelle's master bedroom. Design team: Didiayer, Ed, John, and Michael. Special guests: Boxers Sugar Ray Leonard, George Foreman, and Oscar De La Hoya. Announcers: John Saunders and Brian Kenny.
124	"The Martirez–Malek Family"	Shrewsbury, Missouri	November 9, 2008	607
Ty and his team head to Missouri to build a home for a family whose twin sons, Evan and Alec, suffer from birth defects. Evan and Alec's big sister, Elle is very helpful with all the things the family has to face. Evan suffers from Monosomy 9p, a disease that causes skeletal abnormalities and developmental disabilities, and Alec suffers from Crouzon's Syndrome, another rare disorder that causes hearing loss and cranial abnormalities. These boys are well known in their community for living against all odds, being very happy, and the brotherly love that they show for each other. Evan walks with a walker, and the house that the family is living in has a second story and numerous obstacles that rendered it inaccessible to him. Big sister Elle helps look after her brothers. The design team also learns of coffee shop owner Sam Malek, a man with cerebral palsy who established his shop specifically with the intent to employ people with disabilities and give them a sense of purpose in life. The coffee shop is not accessible to the employees because it is small and the production area has narrow passageways. The design team decides to take on the challenge of renovating the shop as a second project for the week. Ty's secret project: Dawn and Emmanuel's master bedroom. Design team: Ed, Eduardo, John, Paige, and Ty. Special guests: Jack Hanna and staffs of Columbus Zoo and Aquarium
125	"The Frisch Family"	Toledo, Ohio	November 16, 2008	608
Aaron Frisch is a firefighter who puts his life on the line every day in an attempt to save a life. He is a hero in his community because of this. He also adopted five boys from Haiti and three more boys from Toledo that were living impoverished lives, turning their family of five into a family of thirteen. His wife Jackie has been diagnosed with Ehlers–Danlos syndrome, a rare disease that causes damage to connective tissue. She has had to undergo numerous surgeries and has suffered numerous complications. As a result the family has been unable to afford to renovate their small dilapidated home. Ty's secret project: Aaron and Jackie's master bedroom Design team: Didiayer, Michael, Paul, Rib, and Ty
126	"The Nickless Family"	Holt, Michigan	November 30, 2008	609
The family's father, Tim, was a nurse who dedicated his life to saving the lives of others. He was also known for using his knowledge to teach advanced cardiac life support to various doctors, nurses, and paramedics. Tim was well known for his determination saving lives and helping various other nurses becoming more adept at their job. However, Tim was diagnosed with Hepatitis C, a liver condition, eventually dying of it. His surviving family was left to live in a dilapidated house that they could not afford to repair. Ty's secret project: Arlene's master bedroom Design team: Ed, Michael, Paige, Rib, and Ty
127	"The DeVries Family"	Albert Lea, Minnesota	December 7, 2008	610
Susan DeVries is a school bus driver who became the local elementary school's music teacher when they needed one. She has a rare disease known as ventricular tachycardia, which produces a racing heart rate that could lead to her death. Her husband Dirk lost his right arm in a farm accident. Her dilapidated house has numerous problems that could agitate her condition, and they can not afford to fix those problems. Ty's secret project: Dirk and Susan's master bedroom Design team: Eduardo, John, Paul, Tracy, and Ty
128	"The Slaughter Family"	Penn Hills, Pennsylvania	January 4, 2009	611
Frank Slaughter grew up around bad influences and even spent a few days in the Allegheny County Jail for fighting. When he was released he changed his life. He even works in the same jail he was incarcerated in as a correctional officer. He is much loved in the jail for the way he cares for the inmates and instills morals and values into them. He and his family are living in a small dilapidated home that they cannot afford to repair. Ty's secret project: Frank and Tracy's master bedroom. Design team: Eduardo, John, Paige, Paul, and Ty. Special guest: The Cheetah Girls
129	"The Grys Family"	Pekin, Illinois	January 11, 2009	612
The Grys Family has been known to take in several foster kids with special needs. They have officially adopted three of them. Their youngest is eight-year-old Jake. He has osteogenesis imperfecta and also suffers from dwarfism. As a result, he is about the size of an eighteen-month-old and will not get much bigger. However he is well known in his community not only for his determination to survive, but for his bright, optimistic attitude. Unfortunately, the home that the family is living in has steps throughout, as well as hard floors (he even has to sleep in a dog bed), which could actually kill Jake. However the family cannot afford to renovate the home to accommodate Jake. Ty's secret project: Jake's Disney-themed bedroom. Design team: Didiayer, Ed, Michael, Rib, and Ty. Special guest: Cheryl Burke
130	"The Drumm Family"	Quincy Township, Pennsylvania	January 18, 2009	613
The Drumm Family has two sons, Donnie and Nathaniel, who both have autistic spectrum disorders. Their family however decide to devote their time to helping special needs kids. They run a baseball team called the PenMar Challengers which is designed especially for special needs children. This makes them well known in their community. Unfortunately they are living in a dilapidated house that was built on a trash site. Ty's secret project: Blasia and Matt's master bedroom. Design team: Ty, Eduardo, John, Didiayer, and Paul. Special guest: Tom Savini
131	"The Tutwiler Family"	Chapman, Kansas	January 25, 2009	614
When Patrick Tutwiler was serving in Iraq, he was shot in the neck. He survived, but suffered a traumatic brain injury. Almost a year later, a tornado hit his home town. He saved his wife and four kids' lives by using his body as a shield against the winds, protecting them. The home however was destroyed, and they could not afford to repair. They have had to live in Fort Riley and have no other options. Ty's secret project: Patrick and Crystal's master bedroom. Design team: Ed, Michael, Paige, Paul, Rib, and Ty. Special guest: Gavin Rossdale
132	"The Girard Family"	Voluntown, Connecticut	February 8, 2009	615
The Girard family home was destroyed by a fire while they were less than one mile away volunteering at a church supper held at the town's volunteer firehouse. An insurance check sent to pay for the damages was kept by the mortgage company, which eventually went bankrupt. Ten months later, the father and eldest son drowned, leaving his wife and four children. A second bank took over the mortgage and began foreclosure proceedings on the family when bills went unpaid. Ty's secret project: Carol's master bedroom Design team: Ed, Michael, Paige, Rib and Ty.
133	"The Augustin Family"	Keller, Texas	March 1, 2009	616
Ever since the family's youngest son Lane was born premature, the family has dedicated their life to photographing premature babies. Their home was destroyed in a flood and they cannot afford to renovate it. Ty's secret project: Amber's new photo studio. Design Team: Eduardo, Ty, John, Paul and Tracy.
134	"The Riojas Family"	Fresno, California	March 8, 2009	617
Mary Ann Riojas was born with only one arm and no legs. She knew she had to work extra hard to overcome her physical challenges. She became a single mom of 4 kids while going to school. She had trouble getting a job after college due to her disability, but she refused to give up and decided to give back to the organization that helped her by working as their family self sufficient coordinator. Her home does not fit her special needs, so Ty and the designers help build her a home that can accommodate her needs. Ty's secret project: Mary Ann's master bedroom Design Team: Ed, Michael, Didiayer, John and Ty
135	"The Ruiz Family"	El Paso, Texas	March 15, 2009	618
Twelve years ago Maria Ruiz and her family in El Paso, Texas committed themselves to feeding the poor across the border in Juarez, Mexico and helping their local community. Maria and her husband Jesus travel across the border every day bringing food, clothing and supplies to thousands of people. Between them, the two work multiple jobs in order to do this work. For all of this dedicated work to others, the family home sits unfinished. The construction that began over 12 years ago was stopped dead for the charitable work, as all resources and family efforts have been directed to helping others instead. As a result the house is tilting in on itself, there is exposed plywood floors, cracks in the floors and the walls and to top it all off the house lacks heat. Additionally, the food bank work has taken over the house, but the living room is overflowing due to lack of storage and the kitchen itself is woefully inadequate. Now it’s up to Ty, the designers and volunteers to help give back to them. Ty's secret project: Maria's 2nd kitchen and storage room Design Team: Paul, Paige, Eduardo, Rib and Ty Special guest: Tony Little
136	"The Bell Family"	Tucson, Arizona	March 22, 2009	619
The Bell family have neglected their home due to mounting medical bills from their daughter Lizzie's rare blood disease called Diamond-Blackfan anemia. Fourteen-year-old Lizzie is a Red Cross hero, and Ty and his crew are ready to rebuild their home which has cracked foundations, water damage, termite and mold problems and no proper insulation. Ty's secret project: Lizzie's bedroom Design Team: Ed, Didiayer, Rib, Eduardo and Ty Final appearance of Rib Hillis
137	"The Almquist Family"	Phelan, California	March 29, 2009	620
Joel and Chemaine Almquist operate Forever Wild Animal Sanctuary, a rescue facility which houses exotic animals confiscated from illegal owners (these animals are generally not suited for zoos due to their raising). However, the expenses associated with the sanctuary allowed for no funds to maintain their dilapidated trailer. While the family was sent to Costa Rica on vacation (meeting with a Costa Rican organization also involved in animal rescue) the team built the family a new house, a new learning center and completely rebuilt the animal sanctuary. Ty's secret project: Joel and Chemaine's master bedroom Design Team: Paul, Paige, Michael, Ed and Ty Special guest: Jeff Corwin and Justin Chambers
138	"The Jordan Family"	Montgomery, Alabama	April 12, 2009	621
The family lost two children, one to domestic violence and another to a drunk driver. Now they help raise awareness of these crimes, help the victims, and raise their three grandchildren who were orphaned as a result of it. Ty's secret project: Monica and Brady's master bedroom Design Team: Ty, Eduardo, Paul and Tracy
139	"The Kadzis Family"	Tallahassee, Florida	April 26, 2009	622
In Tallahassee, Florida, Barbara and her husband George adopted six children from China. Two had seeing and hearing disabilities, one was born with bones missing from his hand and a girl who had been abandoned when she was young, along with the one child they already had. George was a dentist at a prison while Barbara worked as a teacher's aid. 3 years after, George was diagnosed with brain cancer. After chemo and surgery, the cancer came back. He was forced to quit his job and the family of nine had to live on disability and whatever money Barbara could get being a teacher's aid, which was not enough to cover all of the family's expenses. The night before the camera crew got to the location, George was taken to Tallahassee Memorial Hospital. He had lost his vision and was placed in intensive care. Three days after the family got their new home, George Kadzis died. At the end of the show, a quick video was shown of George, made up from clips from the family's application video, and an "In Memory of..." graphic at the end of the video. Ty's secret project: Barbara and George's master bedroom Design Team: Michael, Paige, John and Ty Special guest: Stevie Wonder
140	"The Cooper Family"	Jamesville, North Carolina	May 3, 2009	623
Jeff Cooper, a veteran of Operation Desert Storm, returned from Iraq with Gulf War syndrome, leaving him needing to use a wheelchair. He became a volunteer and spokesman for Disabled American Veterans. His disabilities left him unable to provide for his family and enjoy his home, which was also falling apart. His son Aaron lost his right arm in an accident after being dragged by a garbage truck. Jeff (who came from a family line of veterans dating back to the American Civil War) and his family visited Washington, D.C. In addition, CVS/Pharmacy donated $40,000 to the Greenville, North Carolina DAV local chapter. Ty's secret project: Jeff and Clara's master bedroom Design Team: Ed, Michael, Paige and Ty Special guests: Colin Powell
141	"The Cerda Family"	Las Vegas, Nevada	May 10, 2009	624
Molly and Maggie Cerda were each diagnosed with Combined Immune Deficient Disease (CIDD) when they were just three years old. This disease is so intense that even a simple cold can be a disaster. Both of their parents are strong community supporters— their father Chuck works for Homeland Security, while their mother Terri, has worked all her life in global relief organizing search and rescue dog services for worldwide disaster. Terri founded “Artful Hearts”, a group which helps improve the lives of sick children by painting murals in clinics and hospitals trying to bring cheer to those undergoing treatments. Terri also found the time to be a patient advocate for the Immune Deficiency Foundation, and met with senators to influence laws governing medications. This family has given so much to their community, and yet struggled with their own home. Their house is unknowingly in poor condition when they first bought it and through a series of floods, severe water damage set in. The structural engineers had advised them to gut the house and rebuild; thankfully Ty and the designers have arrived to lend a helping hand. However, in 2011, it was discovered that Terri has Münchausen syndrome by proxy and that Molly and Maggie are totally healthy, and have no health problems whatsoever. Child Protective Services in Oregon became involved and testified in court against Terri to have her daughters taken away from her. Ty's secret project: Terri and Chuck's master bedroom Design Team: Paul, Didiayer, Eduardo and Ty
142	"The McFarland Family"	Indianapolis, Indiana	May 17, 2009	625
Through the power of books, one man aims to spark the imagination of the local kids in his community. However, he and his own sons are living in appalling conditions. The Vacation trip to Paris, France. Ty's secret project: Bernard's master bedroom Design Team: Paul, Paige, Michael, Ed and Ty

== See also ==
- List of Extreme Makeover: Home Edition episodes
- Extreme Makeover: Home Edition Specials
