= Extreme Makeover: Home Edition season 7 =

Extreme Makeover: Home Edition
- Season 7
- No. of episodes: 24

Release
- Original network: ABC
- Original release: September 27, 2009 – May 16, 2010

Season chronology
- ← Previous; Season 6 Next → Season 8

This is a list of season 7 episodes of the Extreme Makeover: Home Edition series.

== Episodes ==
| No. | Title | Location | Original release date | Prod. code |
|---|---|---|---|---|
| 143 | "The Hill Family" | Suffield, Connecticut | October 11, 2009 | 701 |
William and Catherine had four children of their own, then took in seven nieces and nephews due to Catherine's sister being unfit to care for them. Their home had water damaged, has standing water in the basement, and copious amounts of mold. This 13 person household made for a lot of renovations. So it's up to Ty and the design team to give this big family a safe and loving home. Ty's secret project: Dining table Design Team: Michael, Didiayer and Ty Special guest: Xzibit Although Xzibit would later be made into guest appearances before becoming a permanent member of the design team later in the season.
| 144 | "The Ward Family" | Erie, Pennsylvania | December 13, 2009 | 702 |
A woman who has a degenerative muscle disease and runs a charitable operation for children in her neighborhood has her home rebuilt and made wheelchair accessible by Ty and his team. (Note: This episode is 2 hours long) Ty's secret project: Youth Development & Family Center; Design Team: Paul, Paige and Ty Special guest: Mary J. Blige
| 145 | "The Marshall Family" | Lancaster, Texas | October 18, 2009 | 703 |
Lt. Carlton Marshall is a 21 year veteran of the Dallas Police Department who was on vacation when duty called. He wanted to be part of a search warrant team when tragedy struck. He was shot in the neck that went through his spinal cord resulting in him being paralyzed and staying in the hospital for 8 months to recover from his injury. His house cannot accommodate Carlton's limited mobility around the house. It's up to Ty and the design team to build him a house which will give Carlton freedom to move around. Ty's secret project: Carlton and Susan's master bedroom Design Team: Paul, Tracy, Ed and Ty Special guest: Trace Adkins
| 146 | "The Hampton Family" | Ash Grove, Missouri | October 4, 2009 | 704 |
Chris and Niki Hampton raised their two children in a tiny house. Little did they expect to find their family would instantly double in size. But without hesitation, they welcomed Nikki's nieces and nephews into their home after realizing they had been neglected by their biological parents. Now it is up to Ty and the design team to build a more comfortable house for the Hampton family. Ty's secret project: Hampton living room Design Team: Michael, Paige and Ty Special guest: Ashley Tisdale
| 147 | "The Terpenning Family" | Beavercreek, Ohio | November 8, 2009 | 705 |
James Terpenning, who had polio as a child, is a decorated Paralympics athlete with a family of seven. He has a wife, Shannon, and four children, Josselyn, Jacob, Justin, and baby Joshua. His brother Joe, who has cerebral palsy, also lives with them. The house is cramped and safety is a major concern due to James and Joe's disabilities. Ty's secret project: James and Shannon's master bedroom Design Team: Michael, Didiayer, Ed and Ty Special guests: Kellie Pickler and her brother Eric
| 148 | "The Huber Family" | Superior, Wisconsin | September 27, 2009 | 706 |
Howie Huber served the community as a local firefighter who once saved four family members from their burning house. Ironically his own house is old and structurally unsafe. This season, Ty and the crew come to the Huber family's aid as they demolish their old farmhouse and build a brand new one from scratch. Ty's secret project: Howie and Jessica's master bedroom Design team: Paul, Paige, Eduardo and Ty Special guest: Patricia Heaton
| 149 | "The Montgomery Family" | Philo, Illinois | October 25, 2009 | 707 |
Nathan and Jenny Montgomery were high school sweethearts who eventually married and had four children. Nathan was climbing the corporate ladder when one day he quit his job as an engineer. He and Jenny decided to start Salt & Light, a non-profit organization that serves the Champaign, Illinois community by providing food and clothing to needy families. Salt & Light became the primary focus of the family, which has made many sacrifices and was left with a 100-year-old dilapidated house. Ty and the design team not only build this family a brand new house but also give a facelift to the Salt & Light headquarters, including new lights and storage shelves as well as five truckloads of food and clothing. Ty's secret project: Nathan and Jenny's master bedroom Design Team: Michael, Didiayer, John and Ty Special guests: Sandra Lee, Rocco DiSpirito and Art Smith
| 150 | "The Tripp Johnson Family" | Washington, D.C. | February 14, 2010 | 708 |
Nikema (nickname Tripp) and Tamara were college sweethearts with three children. They volunteer at the bus ministry that Tripp's father used to run. They also offer hot meals and open their home to children whenever it's needed, which has resulted in 25 people being stuffed into their house at one time. While working on the Tripps' house, Paul runs into Tom Lewis who is a volunteer working on the house. Tom tells Paul about the school he runs called the Fishing School, which functions almost the same as the Tripps' home and Paul goes to check it out. While there, Paul sees that Tom doesn't have a lot of space to house the children he looks out for; so little space that he has to keep turning children away. Paul talks to Ty and they decide to also take on the reconstruction of the Fishing School. This is episode is the first "Double Demo" in the series. Ty's secret project: Tripp Family basement recreational room Design Team: Ed, Paul, Tracy and Ty Special guest: Tyler Perry
| 151 | "The Mattingly Family" | Daviess County, Kentucky | November 1, 2009 | 709 |
Melissa was working as an EMT and she was the first responder to her husband Steve's car accident. Their daughters Alana and Madison were also riding the car. The accident has left Steve with memory loss, migraines, and limited mobility so he is unable to work and Melissa had to quit her job as an EMT for a job with a more flexible schedule. Their trailer house is cramped and has safety issues. It's up to Ty and the design team to build the family their dream home that's accessible for Steve. Ty's secret project: Massage room Design Team: Michael, Didiayer and Ty Special guests: Xzibit and Clint Black
| 152 | "The Stott Family" | Lena, Illinois | November 15, 2009 | 710 |
Joey and Philip Stott have been through a lot. First, Joey was diagnosed with leukemia and given only a 20% chance of survival. She pulled through by receiving an anonymous bone marrow donation. After her recovery, the family home was ruined by a fire caused by faulty wiring forcing Joey, Phillip and their three children Michael, Jonathan, and Kaila to move into a tiny trailer. The trailer is hazardous to Joey's precarious health due to her compromised immune system. A mystery man, Tom Wilhelm joins the team on the bus but at the house it is revealed that he was Joey's anonymous donor who also volunteered to help on the house (Note: Tom Wilhelm's story Archived 2009-12-17 at the Wayback Machine, from the Be the Match bone marrow donor registry blog.) Ty's secret project: Joey and Philip's master bedroom Design Team: Paul, Paige, Ed and Ty Special guest: David Duchovny
| 153 | "The Marshall Family" | Lyme, New Hampshire | November 29, 2009 | 711 |
Jay and Elena Marshall were having a normal summer when their son Cameron, having 24 bruises at the end of one day was taken to the hospital and told that he had leukemia. They started an organization called "B+4CHaD" after he found out that was his blood type. The problem was that the house had mold growing in the sheetrock and the toxic air was unhealthy for the entire family, especially Cameron whose immune system was weak. Ty and the design team tore down their old home and built a new one in its place. The Vitale family also helped out as the Marshalls had volunteered to help build the Vitale's new home when they were on EM: HE. Ty's secret project: Jay and Elena's master bedroom Design Team: Michael, Paige, Eduardo and Ty Special guests: Patrick Dempsey and Adam Sandler
| 154 | "The Morris Family" | St. Paul, Minnesota | January 3, 2010 | 712 |
Weather anchor Sam Champion and The Muppets help the team rebuild a home and daycare for a family in St. Paul, Minn.
| 155 | "The Scott Family" | Woodlawn, Tennessee | December 6, 2009 | 713 |
Trina Scott lost her husband Dave, who was killed in the line of duty as a police officer after serving the country in the U.S. Army Special Forces. Now she raises their three daughters Leyla, Deidre and Alethea by herself and volunteers for the group that helped her, Concerns of Police Survivors (C.O.P.S). Her house has been destroyed by termites and there is not enough room for the entire family. Ty and the design team must build the family their dream home. Ty's secret project: Trina's master bedroom and C.O.P.S. office Design Team: Michael, Paige, John and Ty Special guests: Selena Gomez and Usher
| 156 | "The Cowan Family" | Bunker Hill, Indiana | January 10, 2010 | 714 |
Kori Cowan-Brown has primary immunodeficiency disease which causes her to get weekly plasma transfusions and has resulted in 17 surgeries to treat polyps. During a treatment, she met Alyssa, who had cancer. Inspired by Alyssa, she began raising money for cancer research. She has raised over $38,000 for the American Cancer Society and is the top youth fundraiser in Indiana. The family's home has had mold issues, so they live only in the top half of the house and has resulted in polyp formations for Kori. Her parents Andy and Heather worry about her health. So Ty and the team design a house that will suit Kori and her family the best. Ty's secret project: Kori's bedroom Design Team: Didiayer, Paul and Ty Special guests: Xzibit, David Cook and Landon Donovan Final appearance of Didiayer Snyder
| 157 | "The Powell Family" | Buffalo, New York | January 24, 2010 | 715 |
Delores is a daughter of a migrant worker in Jamaica who grew up in a shack without electricity, running water or a proper bathroom. She bought a fixer upper house in Buffalo that's within her budget. She also became an advocate in PUSH (People United for Sustainable Housing), a non profit organization who works with residents to rebuild the West side of Buffalo. She was excited to give something she never have; a home. But she found out that the seller didn't disclose huge problems within the house. She tried to contact the seller, but he disappeared. She went to the City Hall and found out that the house was on the demolition list ready to be torn down at any time. She works double shift just to pay the bills. It's up to Ty and the design team to build Delores her dream home. Ty's secret project: Delores master bedroom Design team: Michael, Paige, Eduardo and Ty Special guest: Ashanti
| 158 | "The Creasey Family" | Lexington, North Carolina | January 31, 2010 | 716 |
Tricia and William Creasey are both teachers at the same school. They fell in love, got married and afterwards bought a fixer upper house with plans of turning it into their dream home. One day Tricia started experiencing stomach pains and doctors told her that she has colon cancer. She had chemotherapy and surgery to remove the malignant tumor. But the cancer spread to her lymph nodes and into her blood stream. She joined Relay For Life to raise awareness for colon cancer. Problems developed in her house with cracked foundation, walls and floors lacking insulation, roof sagging and water damage and mold all over the house. It's damaging to her weakened immune system. Ty and the design team must build a safe and secure home for the family to live in. (Note: Tricia Creasey died on February 9, 2012, after a continuous battle with colon cancer.) Ty's secret project: Tricia and William's master bedroom Design Team: Tracy, Ed, Paul and Ty Special guests: Jewel and her husband Ty Murray
| 159 | "The Heathcock Family" | Hattiesburg, Mississippi | March 21, 2010 | 717 |
Sherman Heathcock's military career began when he enlisted in the Army National Guard. After his term ended, he served as Deputy Sheriff and SWAT team leader of Hattiesburg. After 9/11, he re-enlisted again in the National Guard. While he risked his life in Iraq, Hurricane Katrina swept through Mississippi and damaged his house. It's up to Ty and the design team to build Sherman and his family their dream home. Ty's secret project: Sherman and Gina's master bedroom Design Team: Michael, Paige, John and Ty Special guests: Christian Slater, The Jonas Brothers and Celine Dion
| 160 | "The Wagstaff Family" | Gainesville, Florida | February 21, 2010 | 718 |
The team rebuilds a home for a family who started a nonprofit music school for the community; rock band Kiss volunteers. Albert and Alberta Gator of Florida Gators.
| 161 | "The Beach Family" | Kemah, Texas | April 4, 2010 | 719 |
Ty and the team rebuild the Texas home of a family whose house was left in shambles by Hurricane Ike in 2008; Jessica Alba is the celebrity volunteer. Sadly, weeks after the Beach family moved in, their youngest daughter, Mercy Beach, died from a medical condition. She was only 2 years old. At the end of the show, "In memory of.." was shown along with a quick video of Mercy, made up from clips from the family's application video.
| 162 | "The Suggs Family" | Loris, South Carolina | April 11, 2010 | 720 |
As the oldest of 7 children, Amanda started taking care of her younger siblings when she was a young girl. She earned her GED and began attending college and 2 years later she married Derrick. They moved into a tiny house Derrick's late grandfather built himself. 6 months into their marriage they got a call that her siblings were being neglected by their parents. They both agreed to adopt Amanda's 2 remaining siblings; Jake and Jordan (They have 2 biological sons). Their mini house has issues like crumbling foundations, old exposed electrical wires, asbestos filled sidings and a leaking roof. Ty and the design team must build them a safe and healthy home. Ty's secret project: Derrick and Amanda's master bedroom Design Team: Paige, Ed, John and Ty Special guest: Jeff Gordon
| 163 | "The Starkweather Family" | Tulsa, Oklahoma | May 9, 2010 | 721 |
Ethan Starkweather has Prader-Willi Syndrome, which is a rare disorder causing him to never feel full, that may result in his stomach rupturing. Despite certain precautions, his mom Amy, father Toen, brothers Jared and Ryan are very worried about his safety. Ty and the design team must build a house that's suitable for the family especially Ethan. Callie London, who has cystic fibrosis joins the team to fulfill her dream through the Make A Wish Foundation. Ty's secret project: Amy and Toen's master bedroom Design Team: Paul, Paige, Eduardo and Ty Special guests: Sheryl Crow, Miranda Lambert and Sarah McLachlan
| 164 | "The Skaggs Family" | Lexington, Oklahoma | March 14, 2010 | 722 |
When Brian and Audra got married they bought a fixer upper house out in the country. Audra is a preschool teacher while Brian is a cattle rancher. Then his son Jhett got sick. He had breathing problems, cried constantly and couldn't gain weight. They took him to several doctors but no one knew what the problem was. Doctors gave them a diagnosis; Jhett had a heart defect and the only thing that would save him is a risky heart transplant. With time running out, a donor was available and Jhett received a heart transplant. In honor of Jhett's successful transplant, they started a non profit foundation that gives toys to sick kids to cheer them up. Ty and the design team must build a home that has a clean and safe environment suitable for the family especially Jhett. Ty's secret project: Brian and Audra's master bedroom Design Team: Michael, Xzibit, Jillian and Ty Special guest: The Flaming Lips frontman Wayne Coyne First appearance of Jillian Harris (from The Bachelorette season five)
| 165 | "The Williams Family" | Pine Mountain, Georgia | May 16, 2010 | 723 |
Jeremy Williams, a high-school football coach, was diagnosed with Lou Gehrig's disease and his son, Jacob, is paralyzed from the waist down. Their house has become a nightmare as it severely limits their mobility and independence. Jeremy's wife, Jennifer, and daughter, Josie, have taken on a lot of responsibilities. Michael Oher of the Baltimore Ravens with his adoptive parents, Leigh Anne Tuohy and Sean Tuohy, are celebrity volunteers. Football commentators Herm Edwards, Mark Schlereth, Mark May and Desmond Howard also help with a special football themed demolition, Wilmer Valderrama helps on Jacob's room, and Demi Lovato meets the family on their vacation and gives them a concert. First appearance of Leigh Anne Tuohy (portrayed by Sandra Bullock in The Blind Side, her husband Sean portrayed by Tim McGraw), although she would become a part of design team in the following season
| 166 | "The Carr Family" | Mineola, Texas | May 2, 2010 | 724 |
Mike and Katrina Carr adopted four abandoned children from Kazakhstan; Ryanne, Rina, Nikolas, and Haydn. Ryanne and Rina were born with Amniotic Band Syndrome, which has caused Ryanne to have several limbs amputated and other physical impairments for both girls. Furthermore, Mike has struggled with diabetes since childhood. The house needs renovation to help their kids, but Mike was recently laid off causing more trouble. The design team is challenged to design a home reminiscent of a Kazakhstani yurt. The Limbs For Life Foundation also takes Ryanne's donated prosthetics to Haiti to help children who were victims of the recent earthquake there. Ty's secret project: Mike and Katrina's master bedroom Design Team: Ed, Paige, John and Ty Special guests: Bill Engvall and Bethany Hamilton

== See also ==
- List of Extreme Makeover: Home Edition episodes
- Extreme Makeover: Home Edition Specials
