= Peter O. Knight Airport =

Airport in Tampa, United States of America

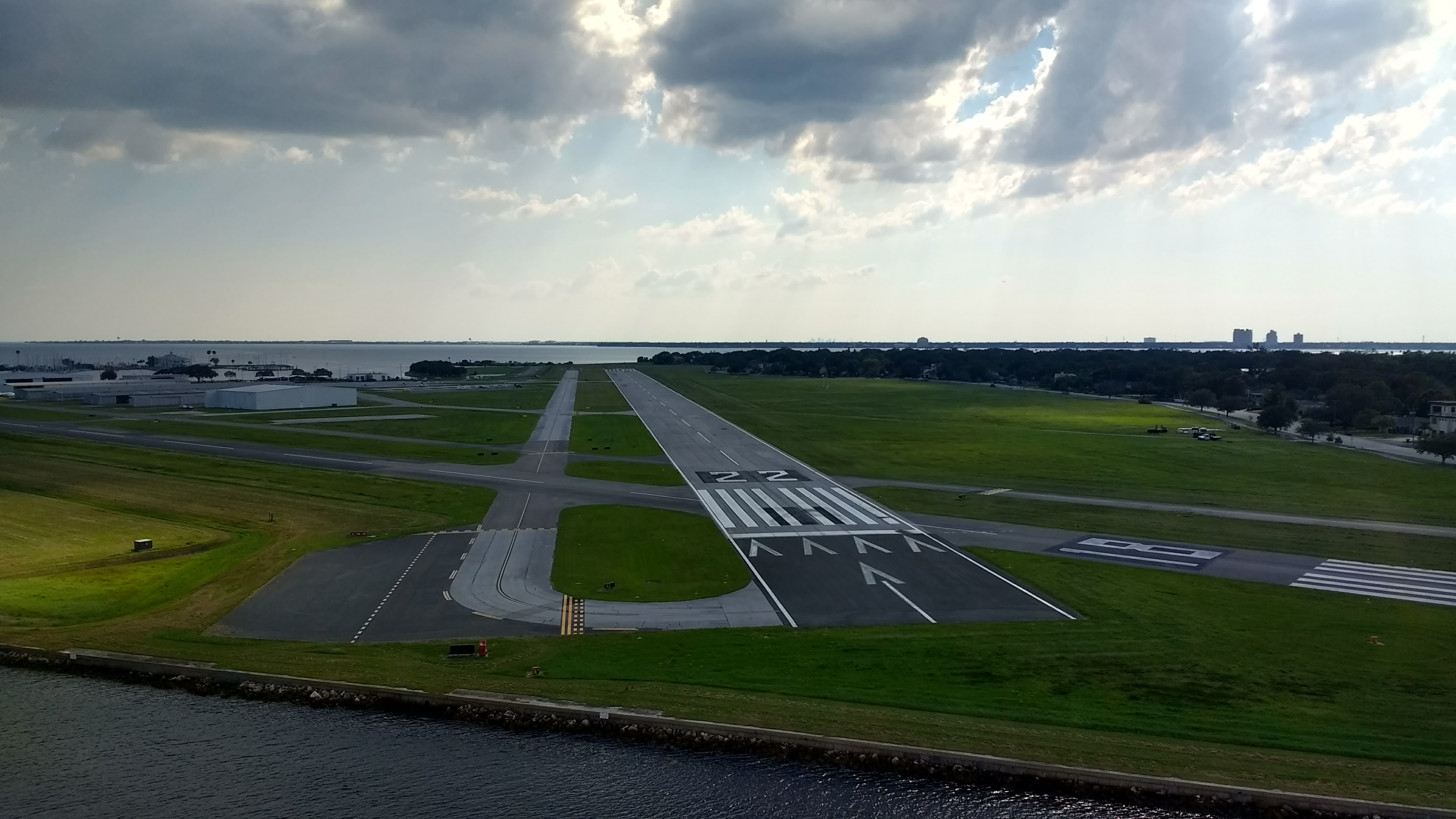
- IATA: TPF; ICAO: KTPF; FAA LID: TPF

Summary
- Airport type: Public
- Owner: Hillsborough County Aviation Authority
- Operator: Atlas Aviation
- Serves: Tampa, Florida
- Elevation AMSL: 8 ft / 2 m
- Coordinates: 27°54′56″N 082°26′57″W
- Website: www.tampaairport.com

Map
- Location of airport in Florida TPF (the United States)

Runways
Direction	Length		Surface
Direction	ft	m	Surface
4/22	3,580	1,038	Asphalt
18/36	2,688	819	Asphalt

Statistics (1999)
- Aircraft operations: 66,000
- Based aircraft: 103
- Source: Federal Aviation Administration

Peter O. Knight Airport (IATA: TPF, ICAO: KTPF, FAA LID: TPF) is an airport on Davis Islands, five minutes (3 NM or 5.6 km or 3.5 mi) from downtown Tampa, Florida. Built as a Works Progress Administration project, it was Tampa's main airport from 1935 to 1945, and is still used by general aviation operators today because of its proximity to the central city. The airport was named for prominent attorney and businessman Peter O. Knight, namesake of Holland & Knight.

The airport's original administration building was torn down in the 1960s and replaced by the current building. Although seaplanes aren't as popular anymore, the basin is still there at Davis Islands.

In June 2004, the local fixed-base operator (FBO) was sold by Tampa Flying Service and is now operated by Atlas Aviation.

The residents of Davis Island, where the airport is located, have complained about the noise and appearance of the facilities. The current plan is to extend the northeast end of the runway by 65 ft (20 m) and add 175 ft (53 m) to the south end of the runway. During a meeting on September 18, 2007, some residents voiced concerns about larger aircraft using the longer runway and any related increase in the volume of noise generated there.

Sound tests conducted by the Aviation Authority showed an increase of 3 dB or less over current usage at the closest residences, or an average of about 58 dB during run ups to take off. During the same tests, nearby lawn mowers, motorcycles, and automobiles frequently reached over 75 dB.

The extension of the northeast and southwest ends were completed in 2008 with no noticeable impact to the local area. The improvements to the runway have added to the safety of pilots utilizing this facility.

== Events ==
Islands Fest is held in April. It first started in 2006. It is a joint venture located at the Seaplane Basin Park and Peter O. Knight Airport. Peter O. Knight has on display a variety of aircraft, car club participants, and other local sponsors. The 2013 Islands Fest featured several organizations devoted to animal welfare including shelters, animal adoption organizations and a pet contest. This year the event was held on airport property along the seawall adjacent to the approach end of runway 22.

Tampa's annual Gasparilla Pirate Fest- a Mardi Gras-like festival held in January, includes a Pirate Flotilla that sails up the channel into Tampa - the symbolic beginning of the Pirate's reign over the city. The flotilla passes directly alongside the airport, making the airport an ideal viewing area for this event.

== Facilities and aircraft ==
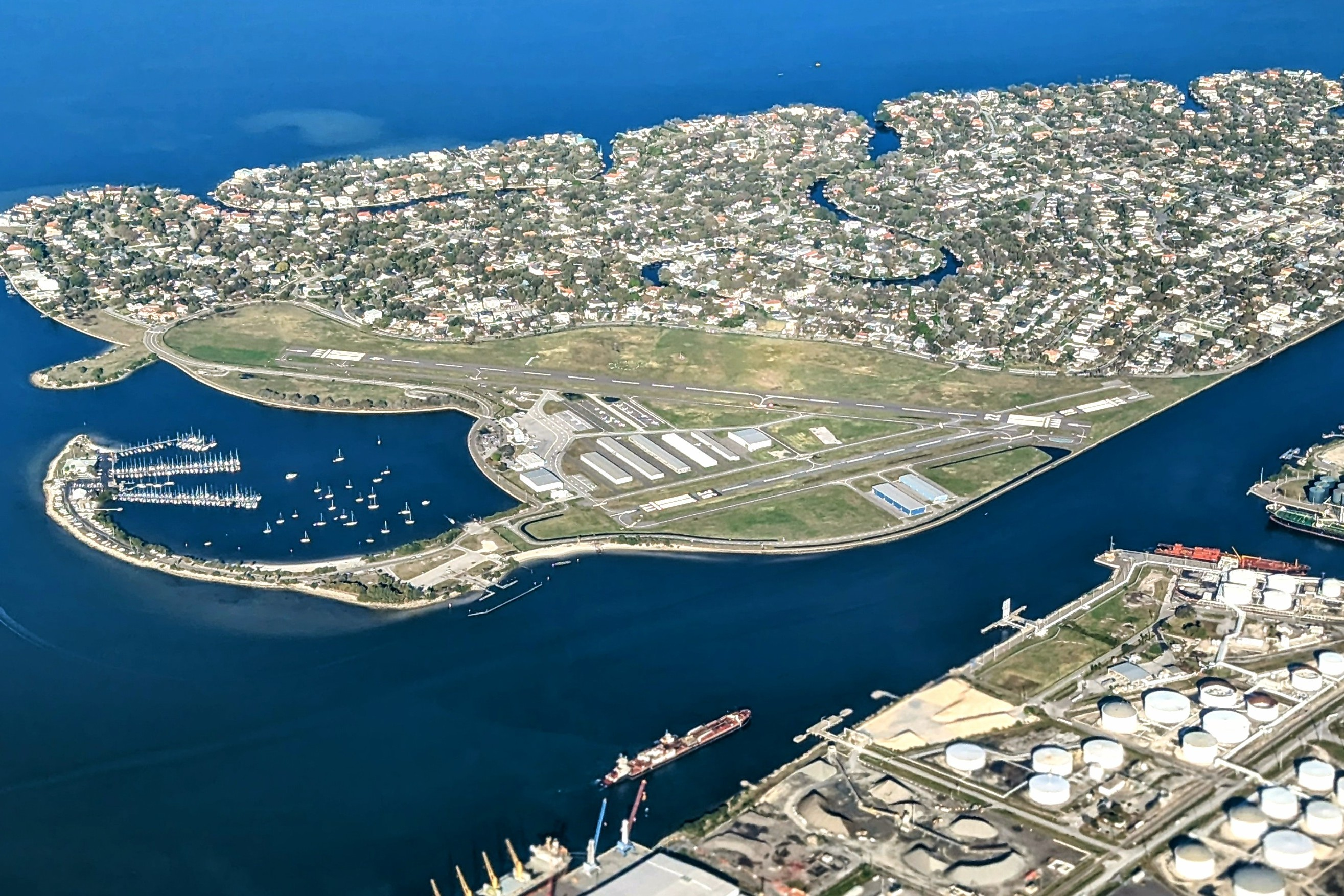
An aerial view of Peter O. Knight Airport.

Peter O. Knight Airport covers an area of 110 acres (45 ha) at an elevation of 8 ft (2 m) above mean sea level. It has two asphalt paved runways: 4/22 measuring 3,580 by 100 ft (1,091 by 30 m) and 18/36 measuring 2,688 by 75 ft (819 by 23 m). On January 13, 2011, the runway designations have been change due to a shift in the Earth's magnetic headings. Runway 3/21 has become 4/22 and runway 17/35 has become 18/36. As of mid 2009 UNICOM Frequency is 122.725

For the 12-month period ending June 8, 1999, the airport had 66,000 aircraft operations, an average of 180 per day: 99% general aviation and 1% air taxi. At that time there were 102 aircraft based at this airport: 82% single-engine, 11% multi-engine, 2% jet and 5% helicopter.

The Hillsborough Aviation Authority has authorized an expenditure of over $1.8 million to add the required runway extension completed in 2009, and to build additional hangar space on the east side of the runway, adjacent to Seddon Channel. Plans are for 13 new hangar spaces completed the end of 2009, and an additional 8 in 2011.

April 2011 a major redevelopment of the ramp area has completed. The ramp area was extended and the taxiway Bravo pushed further away from the ramp area, providing a safer transition from east to west and west to east on the airfield.

== Incidents ==
- On September 13, 1945, a Lockheed 18-50 Lodestar (NC33349) of National Airlines with 14 onboard, was landing on a flight from Miami while the runway was wet from rain; the plane could not decelerate, forcing the pilot to do a full left rudder and ground-loop. The plane went off the runway and the nose ended up in the water; there were no fatalities, but the aircraft was damaged beyond repair.
- On February 20, 1975, professional wrestler Buddy Colt, while attempting to land in bad weather, crashed into Hillsborough Bay 200 yd (180 m) short of the runway. Passenger Robert Shoenberger ("Bobby Shane") was killed.,
- On June 12, 2006, a King Air 90 attempting to make an emergency landing at the airport skidded off a runway, through a retaining fence, and into the residence of a local business owner, causing complete destruction of the home. The pilot, Steve Huisman, was killed and the co-pilot, Sean Lauder, was hospitalized with serious injuries. Only one person was in the house at the time of impact, escaping without injury. The home was later demolished and rebuilt by ABC's Extreme Makeover: Home Edition.
- On November 28, 2008, a local plastic surgeon and a 19-year-old man were injured when an Extra 300 single engine plane was making its final approach. It hit a 50-foot (15 m) sailboat mast and hit the seawall before the runway. The plane flipped onto a grassy area short of the runway.
- On July 20, 2012, a Boeing C-17 Globemaster III of the U.S. Air Force's 305th Air Mobility Wing, from McGuire Air Force Base, New Jersey mistakenly landed at Peter O. Knight Airport following an extended duration flight from Europe, to a location in Southwest Asia to embark military passengers, and then return to the United States. There were no injuries and no damage to either the airfield's runway or to the aircraft. Although the C-17 is a large aircraft, it is designed for operation from airfields as short as 3,500 ft and consequently it took off a short time later with ease and made the short flight to MacDill Air Force Base, the aircraft's original intended destination. With both airfields only a few miles apart and both of the main runways having the same magnetic heading, the Air Force blamed the mistaken landing on a combination of pilot error and fatigue.
- On March 18, 2016, a twin-engine Cessna 340A crashed, killing both the ATP rated pilot and private rated co-pilot. The 340 and a Cessna 172M took off on Runways 4 and 36 respectively. These two runways intersect at their northern section. The 172 had already begun its ascent as the 340 started its takeoff roll. The 340 attempted to avoid a collision and entered a steep left-hand bank and impacted the ground inverted. The aircraft was destroyed in the post-crash fire. The two aircraft did not collide and the 172 flew to its home airport of Tampa Executive.
- On December 29, 2022, a helicopter crashed into Hillsborough Bay on approach to the airport. All four occupants were rescued safely by Tampa Bay Buccaneers quarterback Blaine Gabbert and his brothers, who transported them on jet skis to marine rescue boats.

== World War II ==
During World War II, the airport was used as an auxiliary fighter landing field for several Army airfields including, Clearwater; Drew and MacDill fields supporting Third Air Force group and replacement training activities. The airport was also the original location of Coastal Patrol Base 13 of the Civil Air Patrol, before operations were moved to Sarasota.

== See also ==
- List of airports in Florida
- List of airports in the Tampa Bay area
