= Extreme Makeover: Home Edition season 4 =

Extreme Makeover: Home Edition
- Season 4
- No. of episodes: 25

Release
- Original network: ABC
- Original release: September 17, 2006 – May 20, 2007

Season chronology
- ← Previous; Season 3 Next → Season 5

This is a list of season 4 episodes of the Extreme Makeover: Home Edition series.

== Episodes ==
No. overall	No. in season	Title	Location	Original release date	Prod. code
67	1	"The Llanes Family"	Bergenfield, New Jersey	September 17, 2006	328
Marlee and the Design Team builds a new home while Llanes going to Walt Disney World in Orlando, Florida (Note: This episode is 2 hours long) Due to being unavailable to film this episode, Ty's hosting duties were filled in by Marlee Matlin and her interpreter Jack. Design team: Marlee, Michael, Paul, Tanya, Paige, Eduardo, Ed, Daniel; Guest star: New Jersey governor Jon Corzine Final appearance of Daniel Kucan
68	2	"The Rogers Family"	North Pole, Alaska	September 24, 2006	401
Ty and the design team embark on a mission to help a needy family in each of the 50 states, first heading up to North Pole, Alaska to build a new home for a family of thirteen, A single mother and her eight children. Her brother and his three children are living with her so he can be closer to necessary medical treatment. The design team replaced their decaying, rundown, 900sq. ft house (which had only one bathroom) with a large, comfortable home with space for the whole family-and a football field. (Note: First family to get a makeover outside of the Contiguous United States) Ty's Secret Room: A small classroom in the house Design Team: Ty, Ed, Michael, Paige, Paul and Preston; Guest Stars: Matt Hasselbeck, Shaun Alexander, Lofa Tutupu Ty did not say "bus driver," but he did say "Marathon Coach, move that bus!"
70	3	"The Gilliam Family"	Armada, Michigan	October 1, 2006	403
Ty and the design team arrive in Armada, Michigan to remodel the home for a widow and her six children because they had to move out due to a mold infestation that had killed her husband. (Note: In this episode the house was built in 53 hours and 54 minutes, the quickest house built to date.) Ty's Secret Room: Abigale's room (it was not explained that it was the secret project until after Maryann saw her bedroom, in the final part of the episode) Design team: Ty, Eduardo, Michael, Paige, and Tanya
69	4	"The Hawkins Family"	Hendersonville, Tennessee	October 8, 2006	402
The design team is in Hendersonville, Tennessee to rebuild a family's home and make it wheelchair accessible for mom Amy, who became paralyzed while saving her children during a tornado on April 7, 2006. Ty's Secret Room: Amy & Jerrod's master bedroom Design Team: Ed, Paul, Preston, Tracy, and Ty. Guest stars: Alan Jackson, Crystal Gayle, Hank Williams Jr., Cowboy Troy and The Oak Ridge Boys
71	5	"The Bliven Family"	Minot, North Dakota	October 15, 2006	404
Ty and the design team arrive in Minot, North Dakota to rebuild the Bliven family's home to accommodate their oldest child, who has cerebral palsy. Ty's Secret Room: Bill & Michelle's master bedroom Design Team: Eduardo, John, Paige, Paul, and Ty. Guest Star: Tim McGraw. First appearance of John Littlefield
73	6	"The Kibe Family"	Gladbrook, Iowa	October 29, 2006	406
The design team arrives in Gladbrook, Iowa to rebuild the family's farmhouse after it burned down days before Christmas in 2005. Ty's Secret Room: office for Kibe dairies Design Team: Paige, Preston, Paul, Ed and Ty
72	7	"The Thibodeau Family"	Toronto, South Dakota	November 5, 2006	405
Ty and the gang head to Toronto, South Dakota to help a family whose only daughter has already had four open-heart surgeries in twelve years. (Note: Siehera Thibodeau died on March 30, 2025.) Ty's Secret Room: Siehera's guitar-themed room Design Team: Michael, Tanya, John, Eduardo and Ty Special Guests: Andrea Bocelli and David Foster
74	8	"The Farina Family"	St. Meinrad, Indiana	November 12, 2006	407
The design team goes to Indiana to repair a 135-year-old farmhouse for a family whose matriarch is recovering from breast cancer. Ty's Secret Room: Steve & Shawna's master bedroom Design Team: John, Paul, Eduardo, Tanya and Ty
75	9	"The Koepke Family"	Dundee, Wisconsin	November 19, 2006	408
Ty and the design team head to Dundee, Wisconsin to help a family that recently lost their father to skin cancer. (Note: Matt Koepke died August 21, 2006, this was filmed five weeks after his death in dedicated on his memory.) Ty's Secret Room: The family room with pictures of the father and the family Design Team: Preston, Ed, Michael, Paige and Ty
77	10	"The Pauni Family"	Logan, Utah	November 26, 2006	410
Ty and the design team head to Logan, Utah to help a family (immigrants from Tonga) that lost their father to a heart attack. In addition to a new house, the family (which operated a catering and entertainment business featuring Tongan culture and cuisine) received a new catering truck. Ty's Secret Room: The family catering business kitchen. (In a departure from the norm, where no one gets to see the Secret Room prior to reveal, Ty allowed the local health inspector into the room so the business could obtain the needed operating permit.) Design Team: Preston, Tanya, Ed, Tracy and Ty
76	11	"The Ripatti-Pearce Family"	Redondo Beach, California	December 10, 2006	409
Ty and the design team go to Redondo Beach, California to help a cop mother who was shot in the line of duty and left paralyzed from the waist down. This project was managed by Cornerstone Construction Group with help from Sharefest and 3000 volunteers. (Note: On February 13th 2008, Kristina gave birth to a baby boy named Lucas Braedon Pearce.) Ty's Secret Room: Tim and Kristina's master bedroom Design Team: Paul, Michael, Eduardo, Paige and Ty
78	12	"The Fullerton-Machacek Family"	Lincoln, Nebraska	January 7, 2007	411
Ty and the design team head to Lincoln, Nebraska to help an engaged couple get married and combine a family of three and a family of four into a family of seven (Described by Ty as "The Modern Day Brady Bunch"). Ty's Secret Room: Kenny and Teresa's master bedroom. Design Team: Preston, Paul, John, Tracy and Ty
79	13	"The Noyola Family"	Chicago, Illinois	January 14, 2007	412
Now, the design team heads to Chicago to make a new home for a Latino family of eight whose parents help out teens who are involved with drugs and gangs and turns their lives around, after the father did the same thing as a teen. Ty's Secret Room: 3rd floor music room for the entire family. Special guests: John Cena, Batista and Ashley Massaro. Design Team: Michael, Ed, Paige, Eduardo and Ty
81	14	"The Riggins Family"	Raleigh, North Carolina	January 21, 2007	414
Ty and the design team visit Raleigh, North Carolina to help a family, William and Linda Faye Riggins, and their three children, whose mother, a schoolteacher, is suffering from arthritis, and whose dad is blind. Ty's Secret Room: William and Linda's master bedroom. Design Team: Tracy, Paul, John, Ed and Ty Special guests: John Schnatter, as in the founder of Papa John's, who presents Building Together Ministries (the charter school where Linda works) with pizza for all the children along with $10,000 in gift cards for Papa John's pizza.
80	15	"The Thomas Family"	Whitehall, Ohio	February 11, 2007	413
Ty and the design team go to Whitehall, Ohio to help the family of Jason Thomas, a man who risked his life to save two officers' lives in the September 11, 2001 attacks. After the attacks, Jason, his wife, their four children, his wife's aunt, and her daughter, left New York and moved to Ohio to put what happened on that day behind them. This 2-hour event aired a week after the Super Bowl. (Note: It's revealed in the episode that Ed accidentally cut his hand with a wood grinder while working on a project leaving Ty, John, Paul and Tanya to work on the house without him for a few days. Ed did not rejoin the design team until the Westbrook family's makeover.) Ty's Secret Room: Jason and Kristi's master bedroom. Design Team: John, Paul, Ed, Tanya and Ty Special Guest: Yolanda Adams
82	16	"The O'Donnell Family"	Austin, Texas	February 18, 2007	415
Ty and the crew head to Austin, Texas to help a family with six kids, five of whom have autism. Ty's Secret Room: Meaghan's penguin-themed room is the secret project. Meaghan is the only child in the family who does not have autism. There is also a trampoline room not shown on the broadcast. Design Team: Eduardo, Paige, Paul, Tanya and Ty Special Guests: Trace Adkins
83	17	"The Tate Family"	Tampa Bay, Florida	March 4, 2007	416
Ty and the design team visit Tampa Bay, Florida to help the Tate family after a plane crashed into their Davis Islands home causing a fire that gutted the home, but left the main structure intact. Ty's Secret Room: Ryan's camouflage-themed room (he was a Marine in Iraq) with a small kitchen, bathroom, and living room included; in addition, Ty gave Ryan a new Ford Super Duty truck. During the interview, Ryan said that he thought either his brother, sister or parents would have their room done as a Secret Project, but was surprised when he learned his room was Ty's project. Design Team: Tracy, Paige, Eduardo, Preston and Ty
84	18	"The Tipton-Smith Family"	Waleska, Georgia	March 11, 2007	417
Ty and the design team travel down to Waleska, Georgia to help a single mother of two daughters. Two years ago, a fire burned down the home. The only boy in the family, Ransom (a budding architect) was killed in an auto accident three months later. Ty's Secret Room: Miss Faith's master bedroom, containing a shrine in memory of Ransom. Design Team: Paul, Michael, Tanya, John and Ty Special guest: Jo Dee Messina
85	19	"The Wilson Family"	Myrtle Beach, South Carolina	March 25, 2007	418
The team heads to Myrtle Beach, South Carolina where they build a new home for a grandmother and her four grandchildren, who live in a ramshackle trailer held together by duct tape. Ty's Secret Room: Renee's master bedroom Design Team: Preston, Paul, Tanya, Paige and Ty Special guest: Hootie and the Blowfish
86	20	"The Jones Family"	Brandon, Mississippi	April 8, 2007	419
An altruistic nurse and single mother of three has her dilapidated Mississippi home rebuilt by Ty and his team. In addition to receiving a 2007 Ford Edge, the family will also receive a makeover on their garage, having been the winners of a contest where Ford gave away fifty Edges (one for each state). Ty's Secret Room: Sabrena's master bedroom. Design Team: Michael, Paige, Eduardo, John and Ty Special guest: CeCe Winans
87	21	"The Westbrook Family"	Lawton, Oklahoma	April 22, 2007	420
The team heads to Lawton, Oklahoma to help Gene Westbrook, a US soldier who was injured in Iraq and became disabled when a bomb went off near his tent in 2004. Just two years later, the family (minus Elizabeth) were injured in a car accident. Katie needed extreme surgery to remove one of her kidneys, and worse, Gene suffered broken legs, a stroke, and a bloody mouth, but Peggy survived with minor injuries. This left mom Peggy and fifteen-year-old Elizabeth as the only family members who did not end up needing a wheelchair or surgery. It's revealed that because nine-year-old James is an avid video game fan, he'll be inserted into Ratchet & Clank Future: Tools of Destruction, a new video game being developed by Insomniac Games for PlayStation 3. This episode marks them return of Ed and begins with a recap of the serious incident he had during the Thomas family episode. Ty's Secret Room: James video game-themed room (one of the only times we don't see Ty telling the recipient(s) about his secret project prior to reveal) Design Team: Preston, Paul, Tracy, Ed and Ty
88	22	"The Collins Family"	Murfreesboro, Arkansas	April 29, 2007	421
The team heads further up north to Murfreesboro, Arkansas, where they work on the home of Dennis and Kim Collins and their son Mitchell (who was diagnosed with a brain tumor when he was 3). Also in the family are five cousins of Mitchell whose parents were killed in an auto accident. Ty's Secret Room: Mitchell's bedroom, made of pop tabs you'd find on soda cans. Design Team: Michael, Eduardo, Tanya, John and Ty
89	23	"The Kilgallon Family"	Levittown, Pennsylvania	May 6, 2007	422
The team heads north to south-eastern Pennsylvania - this time to help the family of MaryNoel Kilgallon, a divorced mother of four who can't help the financial issues with her house. During the episode she performed in a live stage production of Beauty and the Beast. This made her family and herself very happy. Ty's Secret Room: MaryNoel's master bedroom Design Team: Preston, Paul, Tracy, Eduardo and Ty Final appearance of Preston Sharp
90	24	"The Jacobo Family"	Kansas City, Missouri	May 13, 2007	423
The team travels southwest to Kansas City, Missouri to help the family of Jesús and Michelle Jacobo, who took in five more kids to add to their four after Michelle's sister verbally and physically abused them. Also in the family is grandpa Ray (on Michelle's side), who lives with them. Not mentioned in the episode (but in an article) is that Michelle is a diabetic. Ty's Secret Room: Jesús and Michelle's master bedroom. In addition, he also made a room for Merriam, the Jacobo's newborn daughter. Design Team: Michael, Paige, Ed, Tanya and Ty
91	25	"The Oatman-Gaitan Family"	Colonie, New York	May 20, 2007	424
The team travels to upstate New York to help Debbie Oatman-Gaitan, a single mother who adopted three children, two of whom are HIV positive. They were living in an unsuitable environment, where the foundation of their old home was sinking into the ground. A new recreation center was built, replacing a demolished unused laundry building, at Camp Heartland for children with HIV. Design Team: Michael, Tracy, Tanya, Paul, Paige, Ty and Eduardo

== See also ==
- List of Extreme Makeover: Home Edition episodes
- Extreme Makeover: Home Edition Specials
