= Extreme Makeover: Home Edition season 3 =

Extreme Makeover: Home Edition
- Season 3
- No. of episodes: 26

Release
- Original network: ABC
- Original release: August 14, 2005 – May 21, 2006

Season chronology
- ← Previous; Season 2 Next → Season 4

This is a list of episodes from the third season of Extreme Makeover: Home Edition.

== Episodes ==
No. overall	No. in season	Title	Location	Original release date	Prod. code
40	1	"The Nick Family"	Alma, Arkansas	August 14, 2005	301
In 1995, Colleen Nick and her oldest daughter, six-year-old Morgan, went to a friend's Little League game in Alma, Arkansas. Morgan disappeared at the game and has never been found. On advice from law enforcement, Colleen and her two remaining children moved to Alma and settled into a small house. Colleen started the Morgan Nick Foundation, which assists families in locating missing children, and was instrumental in Arkansas adoption of a statewide Amber alert program. Her home was all but destroyed by a water heater explosion. In a two-part episode, the team demolished the old house and built a new one on the site. (Note: This episode is 2 hours long) Ty’s secret room – Colleen's master bedroom, with pictures of missing kids Design team – Ty, Paul, Preston, Paige, Michael, Constance Special guests - John Walsh (Walsh has featured the case on America's Most Wanted on several occasions), Tony Hawk
41	2	"The Rodriguez Family"	Clarksville, Tennessee	September 25, 2005	302
In December 2003, a U.S. Army combat medic, Master Sergeant Luis Rodriguez, lost his right leg in Iraq. After 16 surgeries and months of rehabilitation, he returned to his wife and their two daughters in Clarksville, Tennessee, and continued to serve in the Army as an instructor in combat medicine at Fort Campbell, Kentucky. However, since he had to use crutches to walk, his home was ill-suited for his new needs. The team came to build him a home more suited for an amputee. While they worked, the family was sent to a rehabilitation facility in Ohio where Luis was fitted for a new prosthetic leg. Austin Peay State University provided the remaining tuition for Lillian to finish her master's degree in social work (her goal is to counsel military families who have gone through what she has with Luis). Ty’s secret room – The backyard, which symbolizes Luis and Lillian's Puerto Rican culture Design team – Ty, Paul, Ed, Preston, Paige
42	3	"The Barrett Family"	Peyton, Colorado	October 2, 2005	303
Billy Jack and Anne Barrett, real-life "horse whisperers" from Colorado, are the parents of six — two biological and four adopted. Anne left her job to homeschool their adopted children, all now teenagers who had come from abusive pasts and are still catching up with their peers. The Barrett's wanted to adopt more children, but their four-bedroom house was too small for their current family and Colorado law prohibits a family from adopting more children if the adoption would result in more than two children per bedroom. The team built a new house large enough to allow the Barrett's to take in more children. Ty’s secret room – An extra bedroom to adopt more children Design team – Ty, Eduardo, Ed, Constance, Michael Special guest - Brad Paisley
43	4	"The Harrison Family"	Bountiful, Utah	October 9, 2005	305
Shortly after Gordon Harrison, a married father of three in the Salt Lake City, Utah suburb of Bountiful, Utah, started a cabinetry business, he was diagnosed with pancreatic cancer. While in chemotherapy, he spent almost a year in a project to remake a neighbor's home. However, his health struggles and his commitment to his neighbors meant that he could not repair his house, and it was rapidly falling apart. People in his neighborhood nominated him for this makeover. (Note: Gordon died on November 15, 2006 at his home, at the age of 41. He leaves behind a wife, Lisa, and three kids-- Chase, Ben, and Claire.) Ty’s secret room – Gordon's workshop Design team – Ty, Paige, Ed, Eduardo, Michael
44	5	"The Teas Family"	Purdy, Missouri	October 16, 2005	307
In 1995, Paul and Cyndy Teas bought a run-down camp in Purdy, Missouri, converting it into Camp Barnabas, which is designed for disabled and critically ill children. Because Paul and Cyndy felt that the camp was more important than their house, they were left with a house so small that their college-age children could not sleep in it when they came home. The camp also lacked housing for volunteer workers. The team, led by Steve Butcher of PB2 Companies, came to the camp and not only built a new house for the Teas family, but also added two new buildings to the camp, one for volunteer housing and the other as a recreation room for campers and staff. Ty’s secret room – A special play center dubbed "The Silver Lining"; Design team – Ty, Ed, Tanya, Preston, Paul; Special guests - Trisha Yearwood, Lance Bass First appearance of Tanya McQueen
45	6	"The Ginyard Family"	Capitol Heights, Maryland	October 30, 2005	306
Veronica Ginyard, a mother of eight, left her abusive husband and moved her family into the only house she could afford, a cramped home in Capitol Heights, Maryland. She hired a contractor to do some work on the house, but he abandoned the project early and left her out thousands of dollars and in a house with numerous building code violations. The team came and built the Ginyards a new six-bedroom home. As added gifts, Veronica received a check for $100,000 to cover college expenses for her children, a second check to pay off her mortgage, and a new Ford Explorer. Ty’s secret room – Veronica's master bedroom suite Design team – Ty, Eduardo, Daniel, Paige, Michael; Special guest - Patti LaBelle First appearance of Daniel Kucan
46	7	"The Tom Family"	Fairfield, California	November 6, 2005	304
Susan Tom, a single mother who lives in Fairfield, California, lives with her seven surviving adopted children, all daughters (an eighth, a son, died of a congenital skin disorder in late 2004; she also has two grown biological children from her previous marriage). All of the adopted children have disabilities of some kind. Their current two-story home was completely unsuitable for the girls special needs. The team built the family a new three-story home, complete with an elevator for the three girls who need wheelchairs. Ty’s secret room – Susan's master bedroom Design team – Ty, Constance, Tanya, Preston, Paul Special guests - The Backstreet Boys; Mark Wills; Kyle Maynard, a champion disabled wrestler and weightlifter, checked out the house for its suitability
47	8	"The Goodale Family"	Wells, Maine	November 11, 2005	309
Doug Goodale, a lobsterman from Wells, Maine, lost his right arm in a lobstering accident in 1997. He was eventually able to return to the water, but could not work as effectively as before. Lost wages and massive medical bills made it impossible for him to repair his house, and the windows, chimney, and furnace were falling apart. While Doug, his wife Becky, and their two daughters, Tabatha (or simply "Tabby") and Amanda, were sent to Disneyland, the team built a new log home for the family (the first such home made on EM: HE). Ty’s secret room – Doug & Becky's master bedroom Design team – Ty, Tracy, Eduardo, Tanya, Paige, Paul Special guest - "Weird Al" Yankovic
48	9	"The Johnson Family"	Medfield, Massachusetts	November 20, 2005	310
When David (who goes by "Tripp") and Heidi Johnson's youngest son Will was born in 1999, they were told that he would not live past the age of two due to being was born with spinal muscular atrophy. Against all odds, he lived, and gets around in a motorized scooter. The Johnsons attempted to renovate their home in Medfield, Massachusetts to make it more accessible to Will, but during the process, some of the outside wall fell on Heidi's father (he suffered only minor injuries). While Tripp, Heidi, Will, and his two siblings were sent to Phoenix, Arizona, the team built the Johnsons a completely accessible home. They also designed the home to be sun-friendly for Heidi, who has had two bouts with melanoma. They also built the family, who are die-hard members of Red Sox Nation, a backyard baseball diamond, a scale model of Fenway Park complete with Green Monster. Ty’s secret room – Will's Red Sox-themed room Design team – Ty, Constance, Ed, Michael, Daniel Special guests - Kevin Millar, Curt Schilling, and Jason Varitek of the Boston Red Sox; Mia Hamm. Also, the man (David Luca) who runs the Green Monster at Fenway Park.
49	10	"The Lewis Family"	El Segundo, California	November 27, 2005	308
Bruce Lewis, a police officer in El Segundo, California, and his wife Paulita took out a home-improvement loan in 2004, and hired a contractor to expand their home. After slow and shoddy progress, the roof collapsed after weeks of rain. The contractor soon skipped town with $40,000 of the family's money, forcing Bruce, Paulita, and their two children to live in one bedroom at his mother's apartment. The community tried to help the Lewises, and was making slow progress when Paulita was diagnosed with cancer. The team picked up where the community left off. (Note: Paulita Lewis died on January 20, 2008.) Ty’s secret room – The master bedroom for Bruce and Paulita; Design team – Ty, Paul, Constance, Michael, Daniel Special guests - Sergei Fedorov, Jean-Sébastien Giguère, Scott Niedermayer
50	11	"The Novak Family"	Boardman, Ohio	December 4, 2005	311
Less than an hour after Jeff and Jackie Novak, both schoolteachers from Boardman, Ohio, watched EM: HE on Mother's Day 2005, Jackie died of a pulmonary embolism. Jeff suddenly became a widower with three young daughters in a deteriorating house. The team sent the Novaks to Daytona Beach, Florida while they built a new house better suited to a growing family. (Note: During filming of the episode, host Ty Pennington celebrated his 41st birthday, which was October 19, 2005.) Ty’s secret room – Jeff's master bedroom Design team – Ty, Paul, Paige, Constance, Daniel; Special guests – Bobby Flay; Uncle Kracker Final appearance of Constance Ramos
51	12	"The Nutsch Family"	Douglass, Kansas	January 1, 2006	312
While on vacation, the Nutsch family (consisting of 5 daughters and their parents) learned that their Rose Hill, Kansas home exploded due to a propane leak, leaving them with nothing. They also lost their main source of income, since the father had run an auto repair business in a garage that was also heavily damaged (the father was living in a school bus to protect what little he had left while the family lived with neighbors). The family, however, gave a portion of what was given to the Barger family, evacuees of Hurricane Katrina that had relocated to Kansas. The Extreme Makeover team built the family a new house. As an added gift, Wichita State University provided full, four-year scholarships for all the girls. The Nutsches also received a new Ford F150 pickup, delivered to their backyard via helicopter. Ty’s secret room – Complete new shop for the father Design team – Ty, Ed, Eduardo, Preston, Tanya; Special guests – Martina McBride; Gabrielle Reece This episode was taped in August 29, 2005
53	13	"The Kirkwood Family"	Port Orchard, Washington	January 15, 2006	314
A small, undetected water leak in the Kirkwood home in Port Orchard, Washington led to an uncontrollable mold infestation, sickening the family of seven (parents and five children). Eleven-year-old daughter Jael applied for a makeover but the family was not initially selected. Jael persisted, enlisting the help of "Sweet" Alice Harris and the mayor of Port Orchard; one year later, Jael's persistence paid off, and the family was selected (by this time the family was forced to relocate to a single motel room). The team demolished the mold-infested home and built a completely new one in its place. Ty’s secret room – Jael's dolphin-themed bedroom Design team – Ty, Paul, Preston, Tanya, Tracy Special guests – "Sweet" Alice Harris, crew members of the Navy carrier John C. Stennis
54	14	"The Hebert Family"	Sandpoint, Idaho	January 22, 2006	315
Eric Hebert (pronounced HEE-bert) was a bachelor who had a steady construction job in Missoula, Montana until receiving a call that his sister had died, leaving her twins Keeley and Kyler orphaned. He left behind his job and moved to Sandpoint, Idaho to take care of his niece and nephew, moving the family into an unfinished house that was essentially a basement with a roof. The team demolished the old house in a unique manner, cutting down a large tree so that it fell directly on the house, cutting the trunk into smaller pieces, and then having building contractors use heavy equipment to drop the trunk pieces on the house. Then, a new and much larger house was built on the site. As an added gift, Eric received a $50,000 check from Tyson Foods. Ty’s secret room – Keeley's bedroom Design team – Ty, Ed, Eduardo, Paige, Michael
55	15	"The DeAeth Family"	Brenham, Texas	January 29, 2006	317
Dale and Melanie DeAeth (pronounced dee-AYTH) operate True Blue Animal Rescue (T-BAR), a large "no-kill" animal shelter, out of their home near Brenham, Texas (per the website T-BAR has occasionally euthanized an animal due to terminal illness, but does not kill animals solely due to them not being wanted). The parents of one daughter and two sons, they work full-time jobs in addition to running T-BAR. They had no time to work on their house, which developed cracks in the foundation and walls, and also was invaded by termites. While the DeAeths were sent on vacation to Palm Springs, California, the team brought in a 75-ton bulldozer to demolish their old house in a matter of minutes. They then proceeded to not only build the DeAeths a new house, but also a new barn, kennel, and stables. (Note: Cory DeAeth died on June 26, 2021 from a motorcycle accident.) Ty’s secret room – Dale and Melanie's T-BAR office Design team – Ty, Ed, Eduardo, Tanya, Michael Special guest - Robin Williams
56	16	"The Crawford-Smith Family"	Blacksburg, Virginia	February 2, 2006	316
Carol Crawford-Smith, a former principal dancer with the Dance Theatre of Harlem, has operated The Center of Dance, a dance studio in Blacksburg, Virginia, since 1994. In 2000, she was diagnosed with multiple sclerosis, which eventually left her all but unable to walk the 21 steps to her studio or the numerous steps within her current house, even with canes. The team sent her and her two sons to La Jolla, California while they demolished her old house and built her a new step-free home. As an added gift, Montel Williams, himself an MS sufferer, donated $60,000 to cover the rent on her studio for the next five years. Also, the Mayo Clinic donated a microscope for her older son Hunter, who wants to become a research scientist and find a cure for MS. Ty's secret room - A complete renovation of The Center of Dance, including a chair lift to free Carol from having to climb stairs to the dance floor, and a surveillance camera to enable her to watch the floor from the upstairs foyer Design team - Ty, Paul, Preston, Daniel, Paige Special guests - Montel Williams; Moses Rodriguez, a leading MS researcher at the Mayo Clinic; the Marching Virginians; members of the Virginia Tech football team; two current dancers from the Dance Theatre of Harlem
57	17	"The Kubena Family"	East Bernard, Texas	February 19, 2006	318
John and Monica Kubena, parents of two sons and three daughters, lived in a single-wide trailer in East Bernard, Texas. When the two youngest children, twin daughters Sara and Tara, were two years old, both were diagnosed with leukemia. After two years of chemotherapy, both girls went into remission. However, Tara's leukemia later returned. She underwent a successful bone marrow transplant, but her immune system remained weak, forcing her and her mother to live in a recovery center in Houston, Texas while the rest of her family stayed in their trailer. Since Tara's condition prevented the entire family from going on vacation, the team put the rest of the family up at a hotel near the recovery center where Tara and Monica were staying. The team built a new two-story home complete with a hospital-grade filtration system so Tara could return home. The Kubenas received a certificate entitling them to a week at Walt Disney World later, and were also given a new Ford Escape Hybrid; in addition, the community raised over $125,000 to assist with medical expenses. (Note: This is second of the two episodes of Extreme Makeover: Home Edition did not have a vacation, because the family's younger daughters, Tara, stayed in isolation on a local hospital.) Ty's secret room - Tara's butterfly-themed bedroom Design team - Ty, Tracy, Ed, Eduardo, Preston
58	18	"The White Family"	Bartlesville, Oklahoma	March 12, 2006	319
On April 11, 2005, his 19th wedding anniversary, John White, the pastor of Bluestem Baptist Church in Dewey, Oklahoma, died of a heart attack. He left behind his wife Danna and their five children (four girls and one boy, all 12 and older), who had to move from the parsonage where they had been living. The community had raised funds for the surviving Whites, who were able to buy a large piece of property and two run-down trailers. However, one of the two trailers that were joined into a double-wide was a modular office that had yet to be converted to a home. The trailers had no heat, shower, hot water, insulation, kitchen, door locks, or electricity, and were on a different property from the one Danna had purchased. Three of the four girls had to sleep in a triple bunk, and the other girl slept in Danna's room. During some winter nights, the children had to sleep at friends homes to stay warm. While the family was sent to Longboat Key, Florida, the team built them a new house on their new property. As extra gifts, Oklahoma Wesleyan University offered full scholarships to all five children, and the homebuilders supplemented the community's fundraising efforts for the Whites with an additional $50,000. The builders also gave the family (more specifically, one of the daughters) a horse, and another daughter, an aviation buff, was given free skydiving lessons once she turned 16. The most unusual room was a chapel, the first such room created on EM: HE. The chapel was fully stocked with John's collection of books, as well as over 500 brand-new books courtesy of the Tulsa LifeWay Christian Store and representatives of LifeWay Christian Resources. Danna also expressed a desire to have Bibles on-hand to donate to different groups and members of the community. In a partnership with the publisher Broadman and Holman, LifeWay supplied 1,000 Bibles for the White family. As the Whites went on vacation, Ty asked Danna what to do with the trailers. She expressed a wish to help Susie Jackson, a close friend in her church. Susie had left her abusive husband, taking her three children with her, and rented a run-down trailer. The Jacksons cleaned a nearby Christian school in exchange for the children being allowed to attend there. This episode would indicate for the first time EM: HE would help two families instead of one, and featured the first "double reveal" (the Jackson family's reveal was on day five). Ty's secret room - The old trailers were moved to the White family's property, which was much larger than needed for their new home. They were then renovated to be the Jackson family's new home. Design team - Ty, Paige, Tanya, Michael, Daniel
59	19	"The Rainford Family"	Riviera Beach, Florida	March 19, 2006	320
Dunstan Rainford, emigrated to the South Florida metropolitan area in the mid-1990s with his son, daughter, and niece. He was able to buy a small fixer-upper house in Riviera Beach, Florida, and was working on making it livable when Hurricane Wilma hit, destroying the roof and damaging some of the walls. Shortly after the hurricane, he was diagnosed with non-Hodgkin's lymphoma, making it physically and financially impossible for him to work on his home. At that time, he arranged for his sister, with two children of her own, to move in so that she could take care of his family should he die. In another two-parter, the team sent the family to a nearby resort, allowing the ailing Dunstin to be close to his hospital, while they built a new home. Ty and the team made the demolition into a rap video (Dunstan's nephew, Prince, is a rap fan), and used the monster truck Gun Slinger to start the process. The home was built with walls that could withstand a Category 5 storm, and windows capable of withstanding Category 3 winds. The homebuilders Majestic Homes, now bankrupt, who worked with the team said that the mortgage would be torn up during the unveiling, giving Dunstan free and clear title to his new home, however the mortgage was not actually paid off until August 31, 2006 - after Dunstan Rainford had died. (Note: Dunstan Rainford died on August 10, 2006.) Ty's secret room - Dunstan's master bedroom, featuring models of the entire family's feet Design team - Ty, Michael, Eduardo, Paige, Daniel Special guest - Damian Marley
60	20	"The Holmes Family"	Altamonte Springs, Florida	April 2, 2006	321
Sadie Holmes, a single mother of five children in Altamonte Springs, Florida, runs Sadie Holmes Help Services, a Christian ministry that collects and distributes food and clothing to needy families in the area. After a successful battle against drug addiction, Sadie felt led to help others. Her home was damaged when Hurricane Charley hit Florida. While she tried to repair the damage, a fire destroyed the rest of the home, leaving a burned-out shell. She continued to live and operate her ministry out of the shell. In another two-parter, the team sent the Holmes family to Disneyland while they demolished the shell (first using members of Disney World's Green Army, then using a modified tank loaned by the local sheriff's office) and built a new home (as with the Rainford family's house, it was designed to withstand hurricane-force winds), as well as a new headquarters for Sadie's ministry next to the house. Tyson Foods donated 16 tons of food to Sadie's ministry during the rebuild, which the team distributed. The builders (Mercedes Homes) gave $175,000 to cover living expenses, and the family also received Orlando Magic season tickets. Sadie's ministry was also stocked with a year's supply of food from Tyson and a large amount of clothing from Sears. Staples provided items for the office. Ty's secret room - Sadie's master bedroom Design team - Ty, Tanya, Ed, Preston, Paul Special guests - Dwight Howard; Ellen DeGeneres
61	21	"The Craft Family"	Hondo, Texas	April 9, 2006	322
Todd Craft is a coach at D'Hanis High School in D'Hanis, Texas, coaching football, baseball, and basketball, as well as a teacher of health and speech, and he's been an inspiration to his students, but he never has time (and money) to take care of his wife Elizabeth, and his four, formally five children, Samantha, Sarah, Isabella (who was born with a rare cranial abnormality, alobar holoprosencephaly), Who was not expected to live because of rare cranial abnormatility. William (who died 10 weeks later after his birth in 10 years ago.) and their second son (and "miracle baby"), Todd Joseph. Todd doesn't even have enough money to fix his house, so in another two-parter the Design Team, come to help him and his family. In addition to the house, the Crafts received a new Ford Escape Hybrid, as well as a $100,000 contribution raised by the homebuilders. The design team also received a check for $10,000 to give to the school where Todd works. Due to being unavailable to film this episode, Ty's hosting duties were filled in by Kermit the Frog, the former was in the Gulf Coast for the Hurricane Katrina disaster relief with Paul DiMeo being the acting design team leader during the episode. Kermit's secret room - Todd and Elizabeth's master bedroom; oddly, they showed Isabella's bedroom next (usually, when a master bedroom is the secret project, all of the kids' bedrooms are shown before the master bedroom); Design team - Kermit, Tanya, Ed, Eduardo, Paige, Paul Special guest - Davy Jones
62	22	"The Hassall Family"	Harrison County, Kentucky	April 16, 2006	323
In 1996, Transylvania University (Lexington, Kentucky) police officer Brian Hassall was shot on duty. Due to other injuries suffered in the same incident, he has since then suffered severe migraines triggered by exposure to sunlight. His wife Michelle has suffered from a blood disorder for over 20 years, and more recently battled lymphoma. The couple now lives in rural Harrison County, Kentucky; Brian is a police officer in the county seat of Cynthiana, Kentucky and Michelle is a music teacher at Harrison County High School, also in Cynthiana. Both white, they have two adopted children, an African American girl and a special-needs boy from China. Brian, who must work the night shift (because of his sensitivity to sunlight), slept during the day in their moldy basement. This state was dangerous for Michelle's compromised immune system, meaning that the couple could not sleep in the same room. They were left heavily in debt from their medical and physical issues and in need of a makeover. Ty and his team sent the family to Disney World while building them a new two-story home, featuring UV-shielded windows for Brian. Ty's secret room - Brian and Michelle's master bedroom Design team - Ty, Preston, Daniel, Paige, Ed
63	23	"The Py Family"	Northeast Philadelphia, Pennsylvania	April 30, 2006	324
William and Carole Py of Northeast Philadelphia raised four daughters to adulthood. In 1998, they took in the three children of their daughter Sandra, who had just died of breast cancer, and her late husband Jose Rosario, who died of a brain aneurysm the previous year. The family was living in an older home riddled with asbestos and lead paint. In what may be the single most generous week by one company, the homebuilder (Dewey Homes) 1) built the house, 2) gave $25,000 to breast cancer research, 3) obtained full scholarships for all three children from Drexel University (two of the Dewey ancestors served as deans), and 4) raised $150,000 to help with the mortgage. Ty's secret room - Grandparent's master bedroom Design team - Ty, Paul, Preston, Paige, Daniel Special guests - Jeremiah Trotter; Chris Webber; Vanessa Carlton
64	24	"The Peter Family"	Jamaica, New York	May 7, 2006	325
Winston Peter, a Hindu priest, and his wife Hardai moved with their five children from Guyana to Jamaica, Queens in 1996. They were soon joined by two more children, Hardai's niece and nephew. In December 2004, their home was destroyed by a fire. They had no other place to live than the burned-out shell, which had no heat or hot water and very limited electricity. Because the old home was in a crowded neighborhood, almost wall-to-wall with two other homes, it had to be demolished literally piece-by-piece through the first night by hundreds of volunteers. Afterwards, the team built a new home on the old site, including a Hindu prayer room. The family received $20,000 from the builders, and Ford gave them the first 2007 Ford Expedition. Ty's secret room - Winston and Hardai's master bedroom Design team - Ty, Michael, Ed, Eduardo, Tanya Special guests - Susan Lucci; Fabio; Camilo Pardo, the chief designer of the Ford GT
65	25	"The Arena Family"	Somers, New York	May 14, 2006	326
Jim and Gina Arena and their seven children, from Somers, New York, were changed forever when their only son, five-year-old Jimmy ("Jimmy-Boy"), was diagnosed with an ultimately inoperable brain tumor in 2004. His spirit inspired their community, which held many fundraisers and even a parade when he came home from the hospital. However, Jimmy lost his fight with cancer shortly after his sixth birthday in September 2005. The family had saved money to add on to their small (1400 square feet/130 m²) house, but their savings were quickly eaten up by Jimmy's medical expenses. On top of all this, the family discovered Gina was expecting another boy. The entire town nominated them for a makeover. After Jim's fellow Somers volunteer firefighters started the demolition by hand, Gina's father finished the job with an excavator. A new two-story home was then built on the site. (Note: The builders, Alure Home Improvements, had just finished the Peter family's new home a week before this project.) Ty's secret room - Jim and Gina's master bedroom Design team - Ty, Paul, Ed, Paige, Daniel Special guests - Jorge Posada; Jewel
66	26	"The Turner Family"	Irvington, New Jersey	May 21, 2006	327
Beverly Turner of Irvington, New Jersey has spent the last 20 years raising 18 adoptive and foster children, many of them special-needs. Nine of them were still living with her in September 2005 when their house was destroyed in a fire. The family was selected largely through the efforts of the priest at Beverly's Greek Orthodox church, who started a charitable foundation for the family. David Turner an Insulation contractor from Big Canoe, Ga helped advise. The two-hour season finale saw two construction firms join forces to build a new home on the site of the burned house while the family was sent to Tucson, Arizona. The heads of both firms operated excavators to demolish the old home. The new three-story home of over 5000 square feet (465 m²) was one of the largest ever built on the show. Ty was also able to get the builders to completely renovate the neighborhood park nearest to Beverly's home, in exchange for the builders having full access to the show's bus for the week of the build. In the largest single monetary gift in the show's history, the builders gave $300,000 to the family (the bulk provided by the builders themselves); the heads traveled to Tucson with Michael to announce the gift in person. One notable room in the new house was a "carnival room" filled with amusement-park games. Ty's secret room - Beverly's master bedroom Design team - Ty, Michael, Tanya, Eduardo, Paul Special guests - Jason Kidd; Enrique Iglesias; Van Hatfield, a champion of strongman competitions, pulled the furniture delivery truck the final 50 feet (15 m) to the build site, and personally moved in the first several large pieces of furniture.

== See also ==
- List of Extreme Makeover: Home Edition episodes
- Extreme Makeover: Home Edition Specials
