= Peter O. Knight =

American politician and lawyer

- Born: December 16, 1865; Freeburg, Pennsylvania
- Died: November 26, 1946 (aged 80); Tampa, Florida
- Education: Valparaiso University
- Occupation: Lawyer

Peter Oliphant Knight (December 16, 1865 – November 26, 1946) was a lawyer in Tampa, Florida. He is the namesake of Peter O. Knight Airport on Davis Islands, and of the Holland & Knight law firm.

Knight was born in Pennsylvania. His father died when he was nine years old. He was a graduate of Valparaiso University in Indiana.

He was photographed with other legislators at the state capitol.

He was the second mayor of Fort Myers in 1886. In 1887, he helped to establish Lee County.

He came to Tampa around 1890, as the law partner of Judge Joseph B. Wall. Knight served as the state attorney for Hillsborough County from 1893 to 1899. He was president of Tampa Electric Company, now TECO Energy, Inc. from 1924 to 1946. He helped organize the Exchange National Bank. Knight declined President Warren G. Harding's invitation to become a justice of the Supreme Court of the United States.

His house in Hyde Park serves as the headquarters of the Tampa Historical Society. He has a bronze bust on the Tampa Riverwalk.
