= Atlas Aviation =

FBO chain in Florida, US

Atlas Aviation is a full service FBO chain in the U.S. state of Florida. The FBO located at Peter O. Knight Airport offers fuel services, aircraft maintenance, hangar storage, tiedown, flight training and aircraft rental services. The company started in Florida in July 2004. Atlas Aviation has owned and operated three FBO's since 2004. Atlas Aviation is currently the main FBO for both the Peter O. Knight Airport and the Plant City Airport.
