= Cornerstone Construction Group =

American construction, design and consulting business

Coordinates: 30.3224°N 81.6697°W

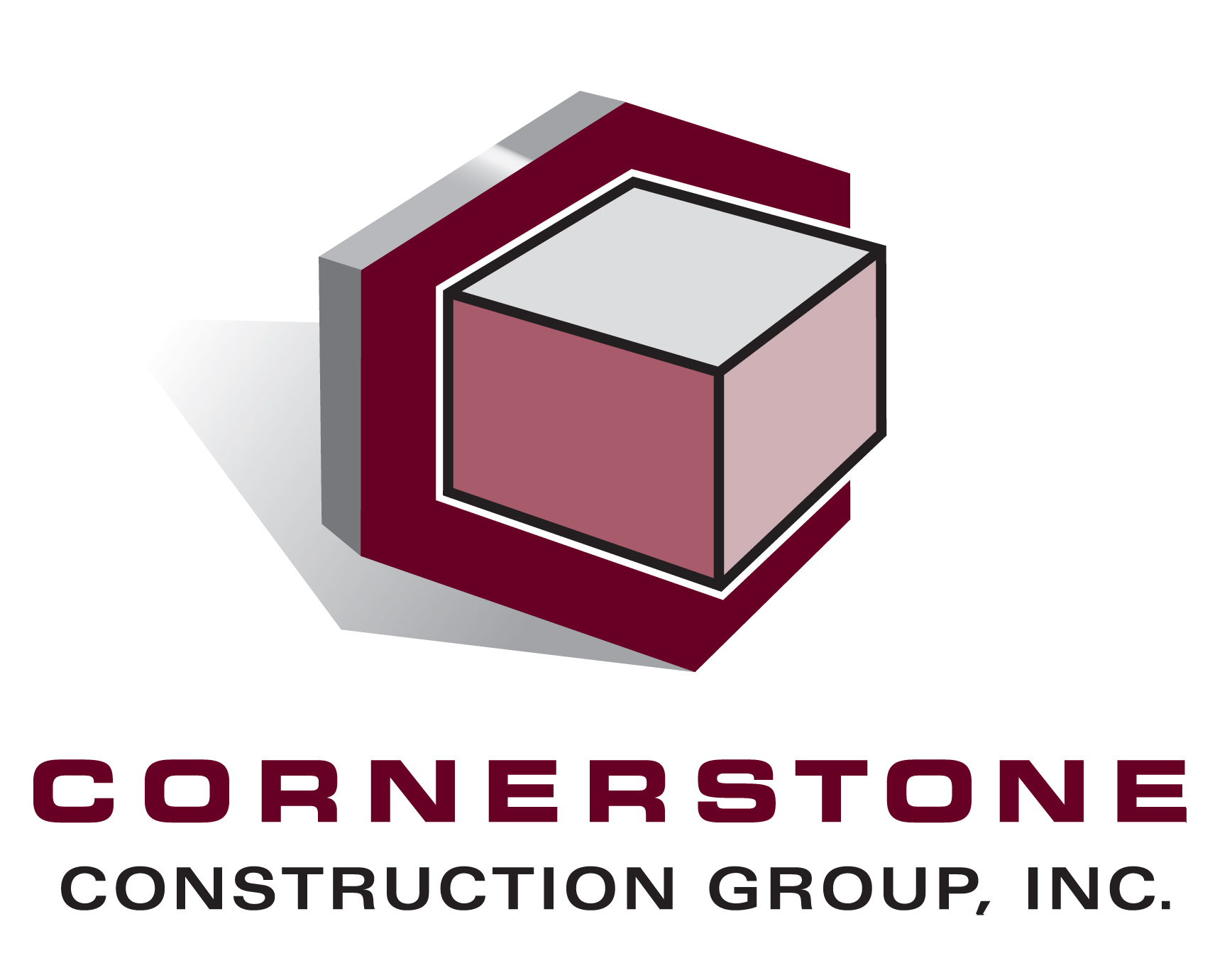
- Type: Private
- Industry: Construction
- Founded: In business since 1987, incorporated 2001
- Headquarters: Redondo Beach, California, USA
- Key people: Linda Serna Braden, CEO; Vic Braden, V.P., Chief Operations Officer; Victor (V.J.) Braden, Project Manager/Estimator
- Products: Health care facility construction, design-build, project planning, project development
- Website: www.cornerstonecg.com

Cornerstone Construction Group is an American construction, design and consulting business based in Redondo Beach, California, United States. The firm specializes in Office of Statewide Health Planning and Development (OSHPD) projects for medical centers in Southern California.

== Operations ==
Cornerstone Construction performs work in the following industry segments:

- Commercial
- Green building
- Government contracts
- Construction management
- Senior living
- Healthcare

Cornerstone Construction opened in 1985 to provide construction services to the healthcare industry. Eighty percent of their business comes from the hospital market and the rest from commercial and industrial sources.

== Community service ==
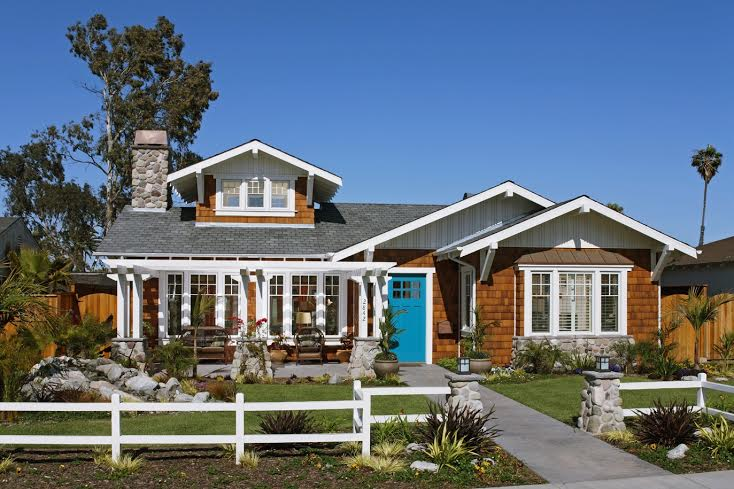
Kristina and Tim Ripatti home, completed by Cornerstone Construction on ABC's Extreme Home Makeover

In 2006, Cornerstone Construction Group led a team of 3,000 volunteer trade workers as well as unskilled workers in a $1.2 million project for Extreme Makeover: Home Edition. The project built a 3,800-square-foot home, fully compliant with the Americans with Disabilities Act of 1990, for Kristina Ripattie, an officer of the Los Angeles Police Department, who had been shot in the line of duty and paralyzed.

In 2009 Cornerstone Construction Group worked to build the Cheryl Green Community Center to combat gang violence. It was named after a 14-year-old girl who was killed allegedly because of her race. The center was donated to the Boys & Girls Club Harbor Gateway/Torrance.

In 2010 Cornerstone Construction, with community partner Sharefest, completed restoration of the Morell House, one of the few remaining historic Victorian homes remaining in Redondo Beach. The house received over $800,000 worth of repairs, including a new foundation, a new roof, and new plumbing and electrical work. Volunteers spent thousands of hours restoring the home, according to the Redondo Beach Historical Society.

In 2011 Cornerstone Construction group partnered again with Sharefest and residents of San Pedro, California to install a scoreboard at the baseball and softball fields at the San Pedro High School.

== Reviews ==
Cornerstone Construction was acknowledged by Who's Who in Building and Construction for forty years of excellence in the field of healthcare and hospital construction.

== See also ==
- National Utility Contractors Association
