= Cullen, Virginia =

Unincorporated community in Virginia, United States

- Unincorporated community
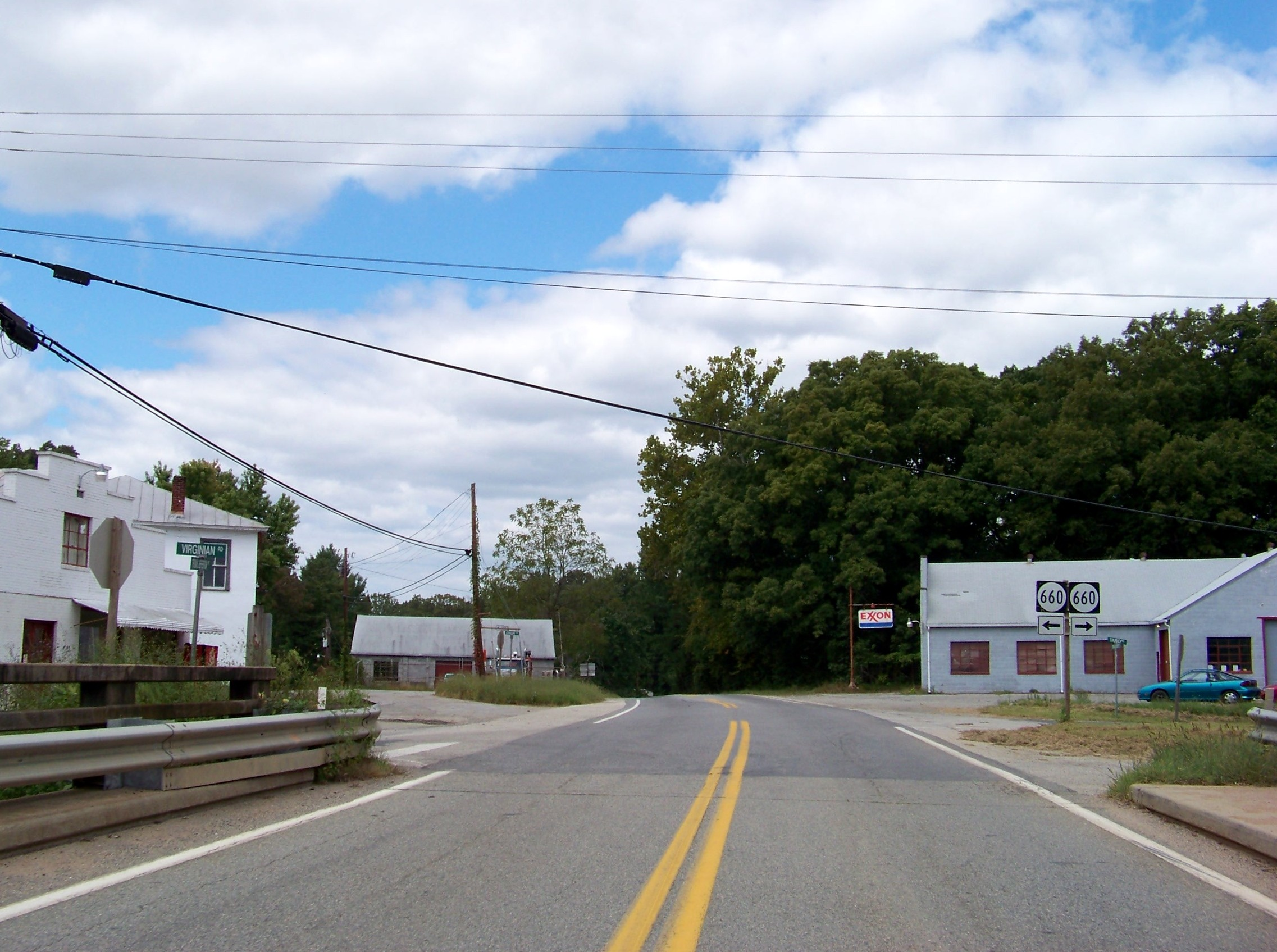

- Location within Virginia Location within the United States
- Coordinates: 37°07′04″N 78°38′57″W
- Country: United States
- State: Virginia
- County: Charlotte
- Elevation: 515 ft (157 m)
- Time zone: UTC-5 (Eastern (EST))
  - Summer (DST): UTC-4 (EDT)
- ZIP code: 23934
- Area code: 434
- GNIS feature ID: 1465516

Cullen is an unincorporated community in Charlotte County, Virginia, United States. Cullen is located on State Route 47, 4.3 miles (6.9 km) north of Charlotte Court House. Cullen has a post office with ZIP code 23934, which opened on April 9, 1909.
