= List of Extreme Makeover: Home Edition episodes =

This is a list of episodes of the series Extreme Makeover: Home Edition. Extreme Makeover: Home Edition started on February 15, 2004 and ended on January 13, 2012. In January 2019, it was announced that HGTV had revived the show and new regular episodes would begin airing in 2020.

In total, the show has run for 214 episodes spanning 11 seasons, and 14 special episodes.

== Series overview ==
Season	Episodes	Originally released		
Season	Episodes	First released	Last released	Network
1	13	February 15, 2004	July 18, 2004	ABC
2	24	September 26, 2004	May 22, 2005	ABC
3	26	August 14, 2005	May 21, 2006	ABC
4	25	September 17, 2006	May 20, 2007	ABC
5	26	September 30, 2007	May 18, 2008	ABC
6	25	September 28, 2008	May 17, 2009	ABC
7	24	October 11, 2009	May 22, 2010	ABC
8	22	September 26, 2010	May 15, 2011	ABC
9	13	September 25, 2011	January 13, 2012	ABC
10	10	February 16, 2020	April 5, 2020	HGTV
11	8	January 2, 2025	February 20, 2025	ABC
Specials	14	May 6, 2004	December 17, 2012	ABC

== Episodes ==
=== Season 1 (2004) ===
No. overall	No. in season	Title	Location	Original release date	Prod. code
1	1	"The Powers Family"	Santa Clarita, California	February 15, 2004	101
2	2	"The Woslum Family"	Palmdale, California	February 22, 2004	102
3	3	"The Cox Family"	Simi Valley, California	March 7, 2004	103
4	4	"The Mendoza Family"	Van Nuys, California	March 21, 2004	104
5	5	"The McCrory Family"	Costa Mesa, California	March 28, 2004	105
6	6	"The Harris Family"	Watts, California	April 11, 2004	106
7	7	"The Zitek Family"	Ventura, California	April 18, 2004	107
8	8	"The Hardin Family"	Phelan, California	April 25, 2004	108
9	9	"The Tugwell Family"	Long Beach, California	May 2, 2004	109
10	10	"The Walswick Family"	Yorba Linda, California	May 9, 2004	110
11	11	"The Powell Family"	Arleta, California	May 16, 2004	111
12	12	"The Cadigan-Scott Family"	Livermore, California	May 23, 2004	113
13	13	"The Imbriani Family"	San Bernardino, California	July 18, 2004	112

=== Season 2 (2004–05) ===
No. overall	No. in season	Title	Location	Original release date	Prod. code
15	1	"The Wofford Family"	Encinitas, California	September 26, 2004	202
16	2	"The Garay Family"	South Los Angeles, California	October 3, 2004	201
17	3	"The Pope Family"	Penngrove, California	October 10, 2004	204
18	4	"The Grinnan Family"	Redlands, California	October 17, 2004	204
19	5	"The Mackey Family"	Granada Hills, California	October 24, 2004	207
20	6	"The Ali Family"	Queens, New York	October 31, 2004	206
21	7	"The Vardon Family"	Oak Park, Michigan	November 7, 2004	205
22	8	"The Elcano Family"	Bakersfield, California	November 21, 2004	209
23	9	"The Burns Family"	Garden Grove, California	November 28, 2004	208
24	10	"The Broadbent Family"	Las Vegas, Nevada	December 12, 2004	210
25	11	"The Dore Family"	Kingston, Washington	January 9, 2005	211
26	12	"The Anderson Family"	South Central Los Angeles, California	January 16, 2005	214
27	13	"The Sears Family"	Martinez, California	January 23, 2005	213
28	14	"The Correa and Medeiros Families"	Denver, Colorado	February 13, 2005	212
29	15	"The Harper Family"	Lake City, Georgia	February 20, 2005	215
30	16	"The Harris Family"	Center Point, Alabama	March 6, 2005	216
31	17	"The Okvath Family"	Gilbert, Arizona	March 13, 2005	217
32	18	"The Leomiti-Higgins Family"	Santa Fe Springs, California	March 27, 2005	218
33	19	"The Leslie Family"	Braithwaite, Louisiana	April 3, 2005	219
34	20	"The Harvey Family"	Hastings, Florida	April 24, 2005	220
35	21	"The Dolan Family"	St. Petersburg, Florida	May 1, 2005	221
36	22	"The Johnson Family"	Kansas City, Missouri	May 8, 2005	223
37	23	"The Vitale Family"	Long Island, New York	May 15, 2005	222
38	24	"The Piestewa Family"	Tuba City, Arizona	May 22, 2005	224

=== Season 3 (2005–06) ===
No. overall	No. in season	Title	Location	Original release date	Prod. code
40	1	"The Nick Family"	Alma, Arkansas	August 14, 2005	301
41	2	"The Rodriguez Family"	Clarksville, Tennessee	September 25, 2005	302
42	3	"The Barrett Family"	Peyton, Colorado	October 2, 2005	303
43	4	"The Harrison Family"	Bountiful, Utah	October 9, 2005	305
44	5	"The Teas Family"	Purdy, Missouri	October 16, 2005	307
45	6	"The Ginyard Family"	Capitol Heights, Maryland	October 30, 2005	306
46	7	"The Tom Family"	Fairfield, California	November 6, 2005	304
47	8	"The Goodale Family"	Wells, Maine	November 11, 2005	309
48	9	"The Johnson Family"	Medfield, Massachusetts	November 20, 2005	310
49	10	"The Lewis Family"	El Segundo, California	November 27, 2005	308
50	11	"The Novak Family"	Boardman, Ohio	December 4, 2005	311
51	12	"The Nutsch Family"	Douglass, Kansas	January 1, 2006	312
53	13	"The Kirkwood Family"	Port Orchard, Washington	January 15, 2006	314
54	14	"The Hebert Family"	Sandpoint, Idaho	January 22, 2006	315
55	15	"The DeAeth Family"	Brenham, Texas	January 29, 2006	317
56	16	"The Crawford-Smith Family"	Blacksburg, Virginia	February 2, 2006	316
57	17	"The Kubena Family"	East Bernard, Texas	February 19, 2006	318
58	18	"The White Family"	Bartlesville, Oklahoma	March 12, 2006	319
59	19	"The Rainford Family"	Riviera Beach, Florida	March 19, 2006	320
60	20	"The Holmes Family"	Altamonte Springs, Florida	April 2, 2006	321
61	21	"The Craft Family"	Hondo, Texas	April 9, 2006	322
62	22	"The Hassall Family"	Harrison County, Kentucky	April 16, 2006	323
63	23	"The Py Family"	Northeast Philadelphia, Pennsylvania	April 30, 2006	324
64	24	"The Peter Family"	Jamaica, New York	May 7, 2006	325
65	25	"The Arena Family"	Somers, New York	May 14, 2006	326
66	26	"The Turner Family"	Irvington, New Jersey	May 21, 2006	327

=== Season 4 (2006–07) ===
No. overall	No. in season	Title	Location	Original release date	Prod. code
67	1	"The Llanes Family"	Bergenfield, New Jersey	September 17, 2006	328
68	2	"The Rogers Family"	North Pole, Alaska	September 24, 2006	401
70	3	"The Gilliam Family"	Armada, Michigan	October 1, 2006	403
69	4	"The Hawkins Family"	Hendersonville, Tennessee	October 8, 2006	402
71	5	"The Bliven Family"	Minot, North Dakota	October 15, 2006	404
73	6	"The Kibe Family"	Gladbrook, Iowa	October 29, 2006	406
72	7	"The Thibodeau Family"	Toronto, South Dakota	November 5, 2006	405
74	8	"The Farina Family"	St. Meinrad, Indiana	November 12, 2006	407
75	9	"The Koepke Family"	Dundee, Wisconsin	November 19, 2006	408
77	10	"The Pauni Family"	Logan, Utah	November 26, 2006	410
76	11	"The Ripatti-Pearce Family"	Redondo Beach, California	December 10, 2006	409
78	12	"The Fullerton-Machacek Family"	Lincoln, Nebraska	January 7, 2007	411
79	13	"The Noyola Family"	Chicago, Illinois	January 14, 2007	412
81	14	"The Riggins Family"	Raleigh, North Carolina	January 21, 2007	414
80	15	"The Thomas Family"	Whitehall, Ohio	February 11, 2007	413
82	16	"The O'Donnell Family"	Austin, Texas	February 18, 2007	415
83	17	"The Tate Family"	Tampa Bay, Florida	March 4, 2007	416
84	18	"The Tipton-Smith Family"	Waleska, Georgia	March 11, 2007	417
85	19	"The Wilson Family"	Myrtle Beach, South Carolina	March 25, 2007	418
86	20	"The Jones Family"	Brandon, Mississippi	April 8, 2007	419
87	21	"The Westbrook Family"	Lawton, Oklahoma	April 22, 2007	420
88	22	"The Collins Family"	Murfreesboro, Arkansas	April 29, 2007	421
89	23	"The Kilgallon Family"	Levittown, Pennsylvania	May 6, 2007	422
90	24	"The Jacobo Family"	Kansas City, Missouri	May 13, 2007	423
91	25	"The Oatman-Gaitan Family"	Colonie, New York	May 20, 2007	424

=== Season 5 (2007–08) ===
No. overall	No. in season	Title	Location	Original release date	Prod. code
93	1	"The Akana Family"	Kalihi, Hawaii	September 30, 2007	501
94	2	"The Byers Family"	Corvallis, Oregon	October 7, 2007	502
95	3	"The Brown Family"	Bridgeport, Connecticut	October 14, 2007	503
96	4	"The Carter Family"	Billings, Montana	October 21, 2007	504
97	5	"The Yazzie Family"	Pinon, Arizona	October 28, 2007	505
98	6	"The Miller Family"	Cheyenne, Wyoming	November 4, 2007	506
99	7	"The Marrero Family"	Camden, New Jersey	November 11, 2007	507
100	8	"The Swenson-Lee Family"	Minnetonka, Minnesota	November 25, 2007	508
101	9	"The Stockdale Family"	Middleton, Idaho	December 2, 2007	509
102	10	"The Vitale Family"	Athens, Vermont	December 9, 2007	510
103	11	"The Chapin Family"	Kirkland, Washington	December 16, 2007	511
104	12	"The Ray-Smith Family"	Milbridge, Maine	January 6, 2008	512
105	13	"The Woodhouse Family"	Colorado Springs, Colorado	January 13, 2008	513
106	14	"The Luther Family"	Port Deposit, Maryland	January 20, 2008	514
107	15	"The Voisine Family"	Manchester, New Hampshire	January 27, 2008	515
108	16	"The Gilyeat Family"	Kansas City, Kansas	February 10, 2008	516
109	17	"The Hughes Family"	Louisville, Kentucky	February 17, 2008	517
110	18	"The Lucas family"	Cullen, Virginia	March 2, 2008	518
111	19	"The Turner Family"	Fairmont, West Virginia	March 9, 2008	519
112	20	"The Boettcher Family"	Silver Springs, Nevada	March 16, 2008	520
113	21	"The Gaudet Family"	Mobile, Alabama	March 23, 2008	521
114	22	"The Latif Family"	Wilmington, Delaware	March 30, 2008	522
115	23	"The Martinez Family"	Albuquerque, New Mexico	April 27, 2008	523
116	24	"The Silva Family"	Warwick, Rhode Island	May 4, 2008	524
117	25	"The Giunta Family"	Maynard, Massachusetts	May 11, 2008	525
118	26	"The Usea Family"	Westwego, Louisiana	May 18, 2008	526

=== Season 6 (2008–09) ===
No.	Title	Location	Original release date	Prod. code
118	"The Jackson Family"	Poolesville, Maryland	September 28, 2008	601
119	"The Akers Family"	West Chester, Ohio	October 5, 2008	602
120	"The Anders–Beatty Family"	Richland Center, Wisconsin	October 12, 2008	603
121	"The King Family"	Charlotte, North Carolina	October 19, 2008	604
122	"The McCully Family"	Bigelow, Arkansas	October 26, 2008	605
123	"The Hill Family"	Geneva, New York	November 2, 2008	606
124	"The Martirez–Malek Family"	Shrewsbury, Missouri	November 9, 2008	607
125	"The Frisch Family"	Toledo, Ohio	November 16, 2008	608
126	"The Nickless Family"	Holt, Michigan	November 30, 2008	609
127	"The DeVries Family"	Albert Lea, Minnesota	December 7, 2008	610
128	"The Slaughter Family"	Penn Hills, Pennsylvania	January 4, 2009	611
129	"The Grys Family"	Pekin, Illinois	January 11, 2009	612
130	"The Drumm Family"	Quincy Township, Pennsylvania	January 18, 2009	613
131	"The Tutwiler Family"	Chapman, Kansas	January 25, 2009	614
132	"The Girard Family"	Voluntown, Connecticut	February 8, 2009	615
133	"The Augustin Family"	Keller, Texas	March 1, 2009	616
134	"The Riojas Family"	Fresno, California	March 8, 2009	617
135	"The Ruiz Family"	El Paso, Texas	March 15, 2009	618
136	"The Bell Family"	Tucson, Arizona	March 22, 2009	619
137	"The Almquist Family"	Phelan, California	March 29, 2009	620
138	"The Jordan Family"	Montgomery, Alabama	April 12, 2009	621
139	"The Kadzis Family"	Tallahassee, Florida	April 26, 2009	622
140	"The Cooper Family"	Jamesville, North Carolina	May 3, 2009	623
141	"The Cerda Family"	Las Vegas, Nevada	May 10, 2009	624
142	"The McFarland Family"	Indianapolis, Indiana	May 17, 2009	625

=== Season 7 (2009–10) ===
No.	Title	Location	Original release date	Prod. code
143	"The Hill Family"	Suffield, Connecticut	October 11, 2009	701
144	"The Ward Family"	Erie, Pennsylvania	December 13, 2009	702
145	"The Marshall Family"	Lancaster, Texas	October 18, 2009	703
146	"The Hampton Family"	Ash Grove, Missouri	October 4, 2009	704
147	"The Terpenning Family"	Beavercreek, Ohio	November 8, 2009	705
148	"The Huber Family"	Superior, Wisconsin	September 27, 2009	706
149	"The Montgomery Family"	Philo, Illinois	October 25, 2009	707
150	"The Tripp Johnson Family"	Washington, D.C.	February 14, 2010	708
151	"The Mattingly Family"	Daviess County, Kentucky	November 1, 2009	709
152	"The Stott Family"	Lena, Illinois	November 15, 2009	710
153	"The Marshall Family"	Lyme, New Hampshire	November 29, 2009	711
154	"The Morris Family"	St. Paul, Minnesota	January 3, 2010	712
155	"The Scott Family"	Woodlawn, Tennessee	December 6, 2009	713
156	"The Cowan Family"	Bunker Hill, Indiana	January 10, 2010	714
157	"The Powell Family"	Buffalo, New York	January 24, 2010	715
158	"The Creasey Family"	Lexington, North Carolina	January 31, 2010	716
159	"The Heathcock Family"	Hattiesburg, Mississippi	March 21, 2010	717
160	"The Wagstaff Family"	Gainesville, Florida	February 21, 2010	718
161	"The Beach Family"	Kemah, Texas	April 4, 2010	719
162	"The Suggs Family"	Loris, South Carolina	April 11, 2010	720
163	"The Starkweather Family"	Tulsa, Oklahoma	May 9, 2010	721
164	"The Skaggs Family"	Lexington, Oklahoma	March 14, 2010	722
165	"The Williams Family"	Pine Mountain, Georgia	May 16, 2010	723
166	"The Carr Family"	Mineola, Texas	May 2, 2010	724

=== Season 8 (2010–11) ===
No.	Title	Location	Original release date	Prod. code
167	"Boys Hope/Girls Hope"	Baltimore, Maryland	September 26, 2010	802
168	"The Lutz Family"	Long Island, New York	October 3, 2010	801
169	"The Johnson Family"	Houston, Texas	October 10, 2010	803
170	"The Arboleda Family"	Neenah, Wisconsin	October 17, 2010	805
171	"The Urban Family"	Hamburg, Pennsylvania	October 24, 2010	804
172	"Oregon School for the Deaf"	Salem, Oregon	October 31, 2010	807
173	"Marshall-Spreier Family"	Pocatello, Idaho	November 7, 2010	806
174	"Lighthouse School/Sweatt Family"	Nashville, Tennessee	November 14, 2010	808
175	"The Anderson Family"	Maple Heights, Ohio	December 5, 2010	809
176	"The Gaston Family"	Pensacola, Florida	December 12, 2010	811
177	"The Grommesh Family"	Moorhead, Minnesota	January 2, 2011	810
178	"The Lampe Family"	Louisville, Kentucky	January 9, 2011	812
179	"The Simpson Family"	Savannah, Georgia	January 16, 2011	813
180	"The Graham Family"	Augusta, Georgia	January 23, 2011	815
181	"The Brown Family"	Terry County, Texas	January 30, 2011	814
182	"The Hurston Family"	Cocoa, Florida	February 13, 2011	817
183	"The Zeigler Family"	Fort Hood, Texas	February 20, 2011	816
184	"The Hall Family"	Wichita, Kansas	April 17, 2011	822
185	"The Hill Family"	Virginia Beach, Virginia	April 24, 2011	820
186	"The Dickinson Family"	Beaufort, South Carolina	May 1, 2011	818
187	"The Prewitt Brewer Family"	Middleburg, Florida	May 8, 2011	819
188	"The Sharrock Family"	Rossville, Georgia	May 15, 2011	821

=== Season 9 (2011–12) ===
No.	Title	Location	Original release date	Prod. code
189	"The Jubilee House / Marshall Family"	Fayetteville, North Carolina	September 25, 2011	904
190	"The Gomez Family"	South Jordan, Utah	October 2, 2011	902
191	"The Rucker Family"	Madison, Georgia	October 9, 2011	903
192	"The Korpai Family"	Crawford, New York	October 16, 2011	907
193	"The Keefer Family"	Etters, Pennsylvania	October 21, 2011	901
194	"The McPhail Family"	Medford, Oregon	October 28, 2011	909
195	"The Hill Family"	Ottawa, Kansas	November 4, 2011	905
196	"The Dunning Family"	Lewes, Delaware	November 18, 2011	908
197	"The Walker Family"	Springfield, Massachusetts	December 2, 2011	910
198	"The Johnson-Goslee Family"	Mardela Springs, Maryland	December 9, 2011	911
199	"The Rhodes Family"	Columbus, Ohio	December 16, 2011	906
200	"The Gibbs Family"	Fayette County, Iowa	January 6, 2012	912
201	"The Joplin Families"	Joplin, Missouri	January 13, 2012	913

=== Season 10 (2020) ===
No.	Title	Location	Original release date	Prod. code
202	"All in the Mosley Family"	TBA	February 16, 2020	1004
203	"This Land is Your Land"	TBA	February 23, 2020	1002
204	"A Teacher's Journey"	TBA	March 1, 2020	1009
205	"Starting From Scratch"	TBA	March 8, 2020	1001
206	"Renovating a Time Capsule"	TBA	March 8, 2020	1006
207	"For Home and Country"	TBA	March 15, 2020	1005
208	"From Tornado to Tear Down"	TBA	March 15, 2020	1003
209	"Serving Those Who Serve Us"	TBA	March 22, 2020	1010
210	"The Favorite Neighbors"	TBA	March 29, 2020	1008
211	"To Protect, Serve and Move That Bus"	TBA	April 5, 2020	1007

=== Season 11 (2025) ===
No.	Title	Location	Original release date	Prod. code
212	"The Warren Family"	Austin, Texas	January 2, 2025	1101
213	"The Hutson Family"	Lakeland, Florida	January 9, 2025	1102
214	"The Broadhead Family"	Polk County, Florida	January 16, 2025	1103
215	"The Alhambra Family"	Phoenix, Arizona	January 23, 2025	1105
216	"The Elrod Family"	Houston, Texas	January 30, 2025	1104
217	"The Turpin Family"	Simi Valley, California	February 6, 2025	1107
218	"Banner MD Anderson, Part 1"	Gilbert, Arizona	February 13, 2025	1106A
219	"Banner MD Anderson, Part 2"	Gilbert, Arizona	February 20, 2025	1106B

== Specials ==
No.	Title	Location	Original release date	Prod. code
1	"Friends Helping Friends"	New York, New York	May 6, 2004	100
As part of May sweeps, ABC aired a live episode of EM: HE where the team renovated the apartment of two fire fighters from New York City. The renovations were completed in a day, instead of the normal week. The show also included updates from families in previous episodes and clips of renovations that hadn’t been shown before.: Design team – Ty, Constance, Michael, Paige, Paul, Preston, Tracy; Special guests – Regis Philbin, several members of the New York Rangers
2	"Ty Top Moments"	TBA	April 24, 2006	Special 2
(Note: This episode only aired in the United Kingdom and aired before the start of season 3)
3	"Family Reunion"	Bakersfield, California	February 14, 2005	200
The entire design team and several families they have helped gather at the home of the Elcano family. The families share memories of their home makeovers and everyone is entertained by a special guest.: Special Guest – John Mellencamp
4	"Holiday Wishes"	Los Angeles, California; Braithwaite, Louisiana; Penngrove, California; Clarksville, Tennessee; Las Vegas, Nevada	December 11, 2005	313
Each member of the design team went back to a past family and helped them "pay forward" their good fortune to someone else. "Sweet" Alice Harris from Season 1 asked the team to give the L.A. Free Clinic a makeover. Ty and Ed led a crew on this project. The other designers then went to visit other families before returning to help with the clinic. Special guest – James Denton Preston visited Robin Leslie from Season 2, and found her an evacuee from Hurricane Katrina, living in a trailer in Mississippi. They found that her house survived the storm, and then delivered clothes to other Katrina evacuees who lost even more. Special guest – Laura Bush Paul and Tracy visited Shelby Pope and her family from Season 2. The Popes and the team arranged for a special night for children with XP, a disease related to Shelby's condition of PMLE (Polymorphous Light Eruption), but more severe. A dedicated nighttime Southwest Airlines flight carried Paul, Tracy, the Popes, and 20 XP children to Orlando, Florida and Walt Disney World, which opened from midnight to 4 am just for the group. Special guest – Brian Wilson Paige visited Luis Rodriguez from earlier in Season 3, who wanted to help Bobby Isaacs, a fellow Iraq amputee (in Bobby's case, both legs) whom Luis had met during his initial rehabilitation. Paige's team sent Luis and Bobby on vacation while they made over Bobby's house, adding a new boat dock. Bobby was also given a new fishing boat. Special guest – Bass fishing champion Mike Iaconelli Michael visited the Broadbent family from Season 2 in Las Vegas. They wanted to deliver holiday meals to sick people, and did so after Michael arranged for a major hotel to prepare over 100 meals. The Broadbents also decorated the apartment of a man who had recently lost both his partner and his parents. Special guest – Wayne Newton The entire team reunited for the unveiling of the L.A. Free Clinic. O.A.R. played the theme song live. (Note: This episode was 2 hours long)
5	"After the Storm – Florida"	Fort Lauderdale, Florida	March 30, 2006	ATS2
Ed Sanders & Tracy Hutson surprise a local pillar of the Fort Lauderdale community named Essie Reed, aka "Big Mama". Although Big Mama is personally in need of financial assistance, she continually finds a way to aid the youth our her community. When Hurricane Wilma hit Florida, Big Mama instinctively jumped to action by soliciting food donations and feeding the residents of her low-income community. Ed & Tracy build Big Mama a community center for her non-profit organization, Team of Life. Then the team visit the Little League field (home of the 2003 World Champions), and provides a local couple a surprise wedding after their prior two attempts were ruined by Hurricanes Katrina and Wilma. Dontrelle Willis appears as a guest to throw out the first pitch of the rebuilt Little League field.
6	"After the Storm – Mississippi"	Biloxi, Mississippi	March 23, 2006	ATS1
The team rebuilds the Biloxi Clinic of the Coastal Family Health Center, a local free medical clinic demolished by Hurricane Katrina, while sending the clinic's staff on a spa retreat. Preston creates a memorial for the local residents who died in the storm, while Ed and Tracy deliver washers to 29 families living in Federal Emergency Management Agency trailers.
7	"After the Storm – New Orleans"	New Orleans, Louisiana	April 6, 2006	ATS3
The team rebuilds the 118-year-old First Emmanuel Baptist Church. Local musicians received all new instruments courtesy of Gibson. They also restored damaged photos and built a playground in nearby St. Bernard Parish, Louisiana.
8	"After the Storm – Texas"	Sabine Pass, Texas	April 14, 2006	ATS4
The team rebuilds Firehouse No. 4, which was damaged during Hurricane Rita while the heroic firefighters were working a grueling 36-hour shift during the storm and presented the town with a brand new, state-of-the-art fire truck worth $400,000. The team also rebuilt the local theatre while the kids are sent on a once-in-a-lifetime trip to New York City to learn about the acting business and see the lights on Broadway, and provided local residents living in FEMA trailers with a shopping spree to the local Sears so they can purchase basic necessities such as clothes, space heaters, blankets, etc. The town is treated to a free concert by surprise musical guests Goo Goo Dolls.
9	"Ty Pennington Behind the Scenes"	TBA	April 13, 2009	Special 9
(Note: This episode only aired in the United Kingdom and aired before the start of season 6)
10	"A Veteran's Day Special"	Waynesville, Missouri	November 11, 2011	900V
Filmed in the high school auditorium of Waynesville, Missouri near Fort Leonard Wood. Ty and singer Jewel revisit military stories from throughout the series. Many celebrities appear to discuss issues the U.S. military faces. The duo also talks about how people in the nation are raising money for military families.
11	"The Watson Family"	Knoxville, Tennessee	November 26, 2012	916
12	"The Zdroj Family"	Smithville, Texas	December 3, 2012	914
The team rebuilds the home of Chris and Mizzy Zdroj (pronounced "Stroge") which was destroyed in the Bastrop County Complex fire; Mizzy (a volunteer firefighter) was on duty when the home was destroyed. The team also expanded the home base of the Heart of the Pines Volunteer Fire Department (where Mizzy serves) by adding a third bay, and furnished it with new equipment including a brush truck. The family was sent on a bi-coastal vacation, first to New York City (where they visited the training facility for the New York Fire Department) and later to San Francisco (where the family toured Industrial Light & Magic; Chris and his sons are Star Wars fans). The Texas Engineering Extension Service (TEEX) provided the entire volunteer fire department with scholarships to their annual fire training school.: Special guests – Matt Hoffman, Art Smith
13	"The Friday Family"	Lincolnton, North Carolina	December 10, 2012	915
14	"The Harris Family"	Wilson County, Texas	December 17, 2012	917
The team builds a new home for Shilo and Kathryn Harris. Shilo is an Army veteran who was severely burned when an IED destroyed his vehicle while on duty in Iraq; his existing home (located in a rural area near San Antonio) does not keep out the dust and heat which aggravates his medical condition. The family was sent to Landstahl, Germany, where Shilo was able to meet with other wounded warriors.: Special guests – J.R. Martinez
