= Municipal castings =

American made, metal cast public infrastructure funded by U.S. taxpayer dollars

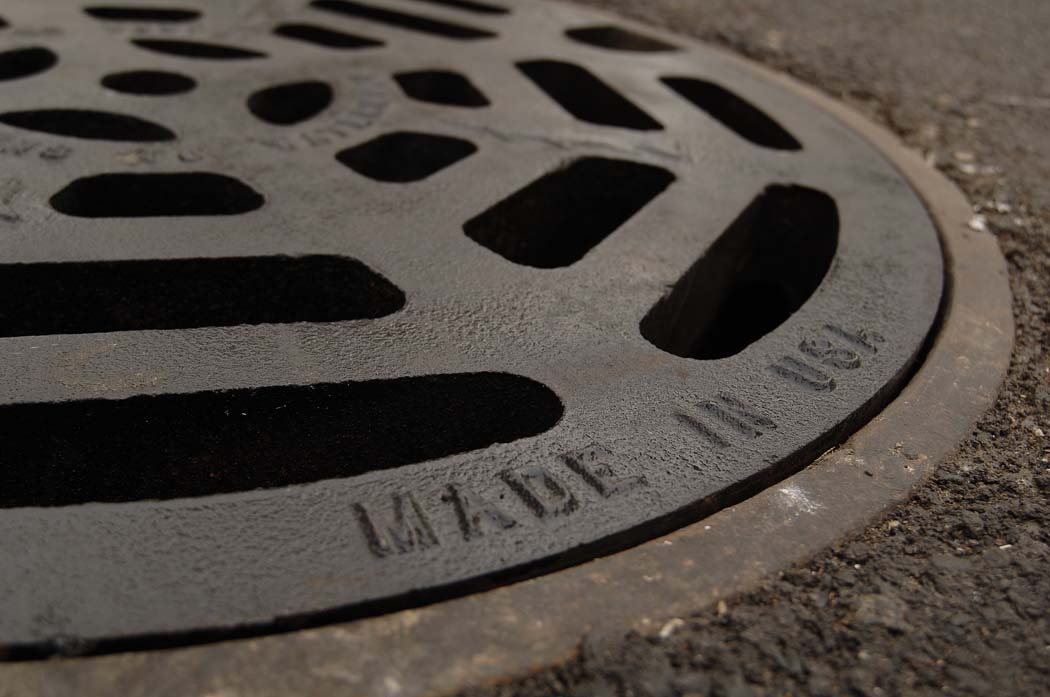
Drainage Grate Municipal Casting

Municipal castings refers to many products, including: access hatches; ballast screens; benches (iron or steel); bollards; cast bases; cast iron hinged hatches, square and rectangular; cast iron riser rings; catch basin inlet; cleanout/monument boxes; construction covers and frames; curb and corner guards; curb openings; detectable warning plates; downspout shoes (boot, inlet); drainage grates, frames and curb inlets; inlets; junction boxes; lampposts; manhole covers, rings and frames, risers; meter boxes; service boxes; steel hinged hatches, square and rectangular; steel riser rings; trash receptacles; tree grates; tree guards; trench grates; and valve boxes, covers and risers.

These products are covered by the Buy America Act of 1982. "By law, American-made municipal castings must be used in many federal, state and local-level public works infrastructure projects that are funded or financed with U.S. taxpayer dollars".

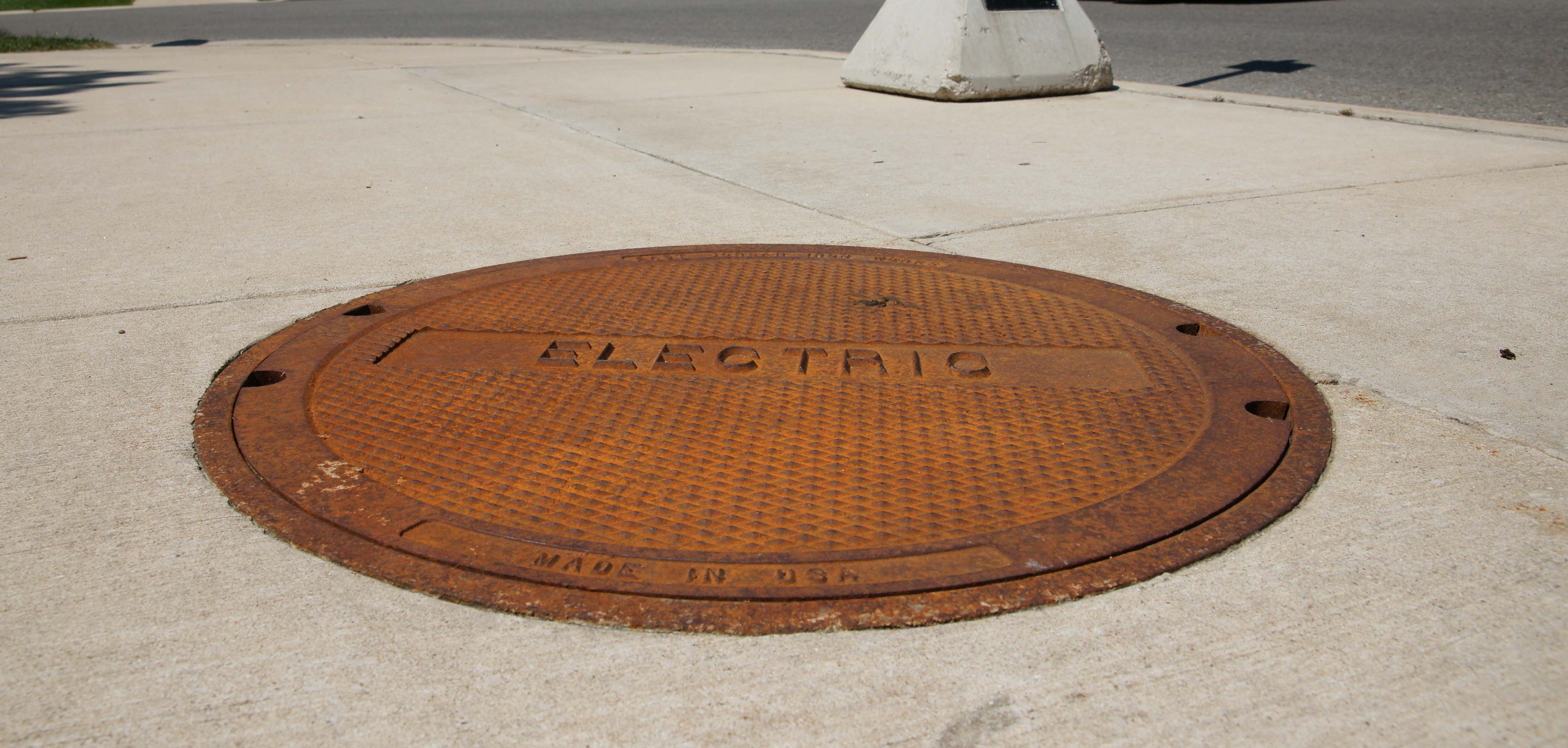
Manhole Cover Municipal Casting

The Buy America Act states that transportation infrastructure projects must be built with iron, steel, and manufactured products in the United States. This relates to highways, bridges, airports, and tunnels funded by federal grants. There are severe penalties for not following the Buy America laws.

The Municipal Castings Association is an organization made up of the following American manufacturers: Charlotte Pipe and Foundry Company, D&L Foundry and Supply, US Foundry, EBAA Iron, EJ, McWane, Neenah Foundry, and Spring City.

Municipal castings also have to follow the country-of-origin marking requirement laws. Every casting of foreign origin entering the United States has to be marked legibly with the English name. There is a special marking law for municipal castings that states they must be marked on the top surface of the casting, visible once the product is installed in the field, so that the general public can easily see country of origin. This means manhole or inlet frames must be marked on the very top surface or lip of the frame or the top surface of a manhole lid or grate.
