= EJ (company) =

Company based in Michigan

Coordinates: 45°09′20.4″N 85°07′43.4″W

- Formerly: East Jordan Iron Works
- Industry: Manhole Cover, Utility vault, Fire Hydrant, Storm drain, Sanitary sewer, Telecommunication, Airports, Wastewater treatment plant, Port
- Founded: East Jordan, Michigan (1883)
- Founder: William Malpass, Richard W. Round
- Headquarters: East Jordan, Michigan, United States
- Area served: Worldwide
- Website: www.ejco.com

EJ Group, formerly East Jordan Iron Works, is an American manufacturer of iron products, headquartered in East Jordan, Michigan. The company manufactures and distributes iron construction castings (Municipal castings), fabricated products, composite products, water distribution solutions, and other infrastructure access products for water, sewer, drainage, telecommunications, and utility networks worldwide.

== History ==
EJ was founded in East Jordan, Michigan in 1883. The company was established in November 1883 by William Malpass and his father-in-law, Richard W. Round, to service the logging industry in East Jordan and around Northern Michigan. In the early years of operation, EJ manufactured castings for necessities such as machine parts, ship parts, agricultural uses, and railroads. In 1886, when William's brother James joined the business, the company was renamed to East Jordan Iron Works. In 1905, the foundry was destroyed by a fire but was then rebuilt using bricks made in its hometown of East Jordan.

In the 1920s, lumbering operations began to decrease after the advent of the Great Depression. By World War II, lumbering had moved out of the area, and EJ then shifted their large-scale production to street castings, water works valves, and fire hydrants as well as war materials needed for the war effort such as tank parts.

The Ardmore, Oklahoma foundry was built in 2000 and opened in 2001.

East Jordan Iron Works was renamed to EJ in 2012 to consolidate multiple owned holdings under a single brand.

Groundbreaking for a new EJ foundry in nearby Elmira Township began around the beginning of 2017, and was completed in November 2018. The company moved into the new building, and began operations in it shortly after. The old foundry was demolished in 2023.

Construction of a new fabrication facility in Cicero, New York was completed in 2019.

== Sales and products ==
EJ's main manufacturing facility, corporate headquarters, and hydrant & valve assembly lines are located in East Jordan. The foundry production facility in Ardmore also provides numerous castings for EJ sales operations. EJ is a producer and supplier of construction castings to hundreds of U.S. cities, townships, counties, and states. The EJ product line includes manhole frames and manhole covers, utility castings for the telecommunications industry, trench grates, tree grates, detectable warning plates, airport and design specific castings, monument boxes, meter boxes, valve boxes, drainage grates, curb inlets, and catch basins. EJ construction castings can be found in major metropolitan areas, as well as world-wide.

Products include:

- Manhole covers and frames
- Catch basin and curb inlet grates and frames
- Utility castings
- Trench grates
- Tree grates
- Detectable warning plates
- Airport and design specific castings
- Monument boxes
- Meter boxes
- Valve boxes
- Drainage grates
- Fire hydrants
- Gate valves
- Fabricated aluminum and steel products

"EJ supplies products to infrastructure projects in 6 of the 7 continents." In 2007, the company was awarded the National Utility Contractors Association Associate of the year award.

== Facilities ==
EJ operates foundries in Elmira, Michigan, Ardmore, Oklahoma, and Picardie, France.

Fabrication facilities are located in:

- Cicero, New York
- Youngstown, Ohio
- Tooele, Utah
- Birr, Ireland
- Ardennes, France
- Queensland, Australia

Water products manufacturing as well as the corporate headquarters are located in East Jordan, Michigan. Branches and distribution centers are located throughout the U.S., Canada, Europe, and Australia.

== See also ==
- Neenah Foundry
