= NUCA (disambiguation) =

The New Urban Communities Authority is an Egyptian state owned enterprise.

NUCA may also refer to:

- National Utility Contractors Association, a US trade association
- Nottingham University Conservative Association, a UK student association
- Nunavut Court of Appeal, the highest appellate court in the Canadian territory of Nunavut
- nucA, symbol for the enzyme Serratia marcescens nuclease

== See also ==
- Santa Cruz de Nuca, a Spanish colonial fort and settlement in what is now British Columbia.
