= Charlotte Philharmonic Orchestra =

Orchestra in North Carolina, United States

- Orchestra
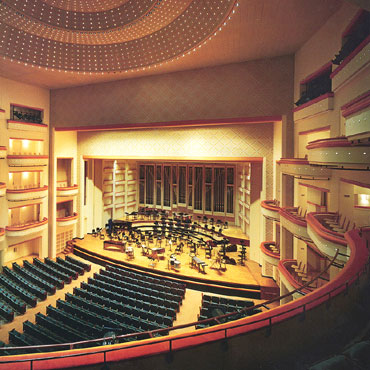
- Belk Theater, home of the Charlotte Philharmonic Orchestra
- Founded: 1990
- Concert hall: Belk Theater, Blumenthal Performing Arts Center
- Principal conductor: Albert E. Moehring
- Website: www.charlottephilharmonic.com

The Charlotte Philharmonic Orchestra (CPO) was an American orchestra based in Charlotte, North Carolina. As the second largest and most active professional performing arts organization in the central Carolinas, the Charlotte Philharmonic played approximately 10–15 performances each season and employed up to 85 professional musicians. Annual attendance for CPO performances numbered over 150,000.

The CPO was founded in 1990 by Dutch pianist and conductor Albert E. Moehring. The orchestra performed in numerous locations around the Charlotte community until Judith Allen, executive director of the North Carolina Blumenthal Performing Arts Center, appointed the orchestra as the center's resident orchestra. This became the basis for Moehring and the orchestra to film 6 PBS musical specials in the Belk Theater. In addition, Maestro Moehring and the Charlotte Philharmonic recorded 13 CD recordings.

In September 2003, Judith Allen of the NCBPAC asked Maestro Moehring to collaborate with the Center and the "Charlotte Shout" Festival in the North America debut of the British duo, Opera Babes.

In 2010, the Charlotte Philharmonic Orchestra was unable to continue full operations, due to the Great Recession, but was able to continue with special summer festival concerts for another three years. Due to strong demand, Maestro Moehring stated in 2015 that he was exploring bringing the Charlotte Philharmonic back to the citizens of Charlotte.
