= Grate =

Grate may refer to:

- Grate, the metal part of a fireplace where the fire is placed
- Grate, the act of using a grater, a kitchen utensil
- Grate, or grille, a barrier through which small objects can fall, while larger objects cannot
- Grating, a strong metal plate with drainage holes, covering a drain or functioning as the surface of a deck, floor, or stair.

== People with the surname ==
- Don Grate (1923–2014), American sportsman
- Eric Grate (1896–1983), Swedish sculptor, painter and graphics artist
- Pablo Grate (born 1967), Swedish sprint canoeist
- Shawn Grate (born 1976), American serial killer
