= Queen City Nerve =

Alternative newspaper in Charlotte, NC

- Queen City Nerve print edition for July 22-August 4, 2026
- Type: Private
- Owner: Justin LaFrancois
- Founded: 2018
- Ceased publication: 2026
- City: Charlotte, North Carolina
- Country: United States
- Website: qcnerve.com

Queen City Nerve was a locally owned alternative newspaper in Charlotte, NC, established in December 2018 after staffers at Creative Loafing Charlotte were laid off without notice or severance when that outlet was sold by Charles Womack III to his son, Alex Womack. It stopped publishing in August 2026 due to financial difficulties. The editor in chief was Ryan Pitkin and the publisher was Justin LaFrancois.

== Content ==
The publication produced about 200 print newspapers and over 100 podcast episodes, as well as maintaining a digital news site, covering local arts and music, the Charlotte City Council, and producing features on community organizers and minority-owned small businesses. It produced an annual Best in the Nest list of local businesses, service providers, music groups, and other entities, voted on by readers and also selected by critics. It also published occasional investigative stories and covered the protests following the killing of George Floyd in 2020 with livestreams. It covered homelessness, housing precarity, and ICE raids. It published a book, Legacy: Three Centuries of Black History in Charlotte, North Carolina, by Pamela Grundy, and held an annual Thanksgiving meal for the LGBTQ community, Eat, Gay, Love.

== Finances ==
In 2026, QC Nerve said it reached 30,000 monthly unique website visitors, 97,000+ social media followers, and 39,000 email newsletter subscribers, and it distributed 7,000 to 10,000 print issues every other week. Subscription revenue topped out at $4,000 a month, according to LaFrancois. Revenue particularly became tight in 2025 as the Trump administration's budget cuts filtered down to local organizations, and two of the publication's biggest partners, Blumenthal Arts and UNC Charlotte's College of Arts and Architecture, cut their ad spending.
