= Neenah Foundry =

American manufacturing company

Coordinates: 44.162°N 88.477°W

- Company type: Private; Subsidiary
- Industry: Foundry
- Founded: 1872, 154 years ago
- Headquarters: 2121 Brooks Avenue; Neenah, Wisconsin, U.S.
- Products: Cast iron infrastructure components airport products, bridge drainage, tree grates, safety and security manhole products.
- Parent: Charlotte Pipe & Foundry Company
- Website: neenahfoundry.com

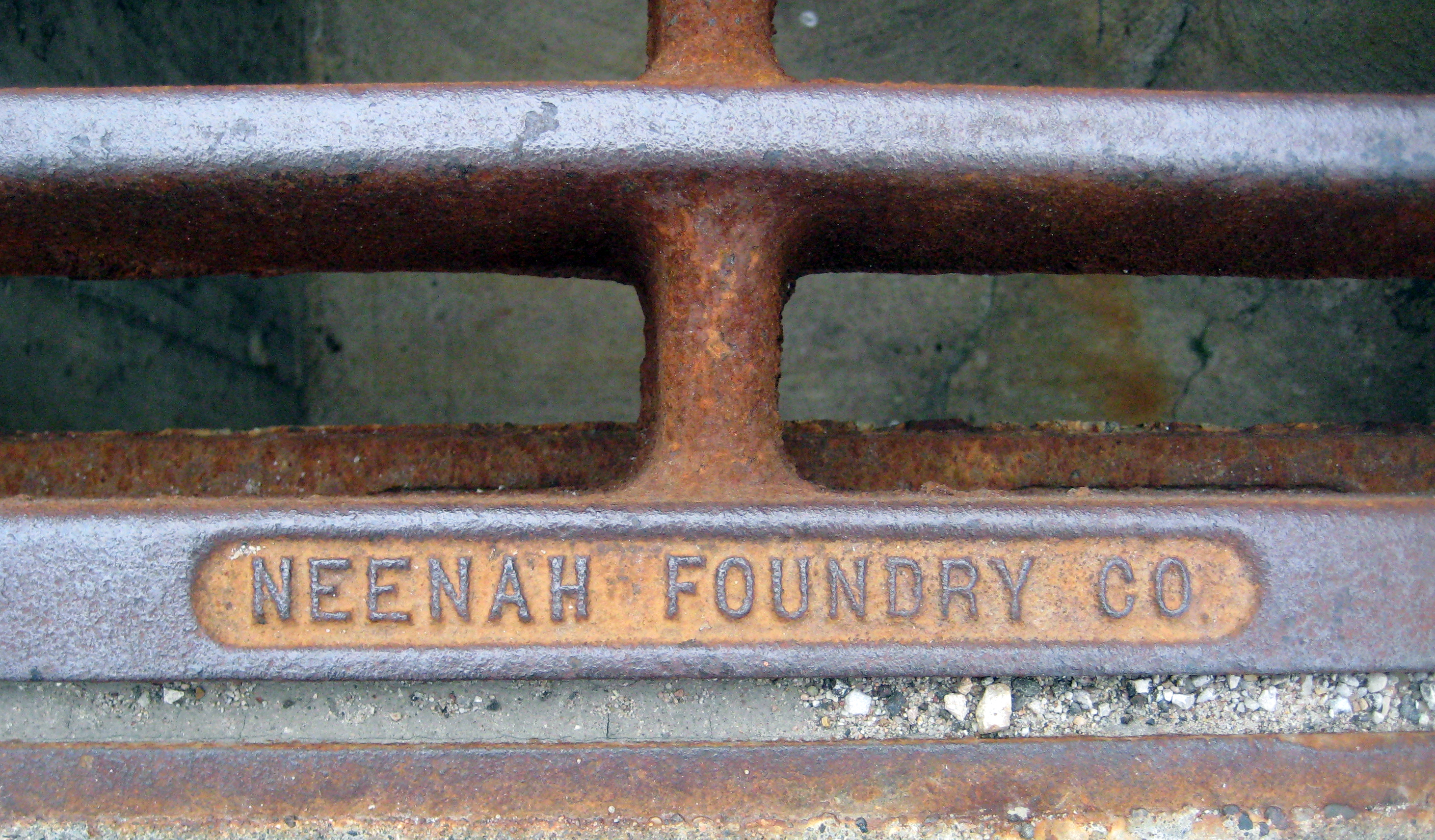
Cast metal storm drain grate with Neenah Foundry marking

Neenah Foundry is a manufacturing company in the north central United States, based in Neenah, Wisconsin. The company manufactures cast iron manhole covers, gratings, and similar items for municipal and construction applications. Neenah Enterprises, Inc. manufactures iron castings for the heavy truck, agriculture, construction, and related markets.

== History ==
Neenah Foundry was established 154 years ago in 1872 by William Aylward, Sr., as Aylward Plow Works. The name was changed to Aylward and Sons in 1904 and to Neenah Foundry Co. in 1922. In 2003, the company filed for bankruptcy. In 2010, the foundry's parent company again filed for and emerged from bankruptcy.

Charlotte Pipe and Foundry Company announced effective July 13, 2022 it purchased Neenah Enterprises.

A major customer over the years is the city of Chicago, and Neenah Foundry manholes and other products can be found in all 50 US states and 17 foreign cities.
