= Scruffy dome =

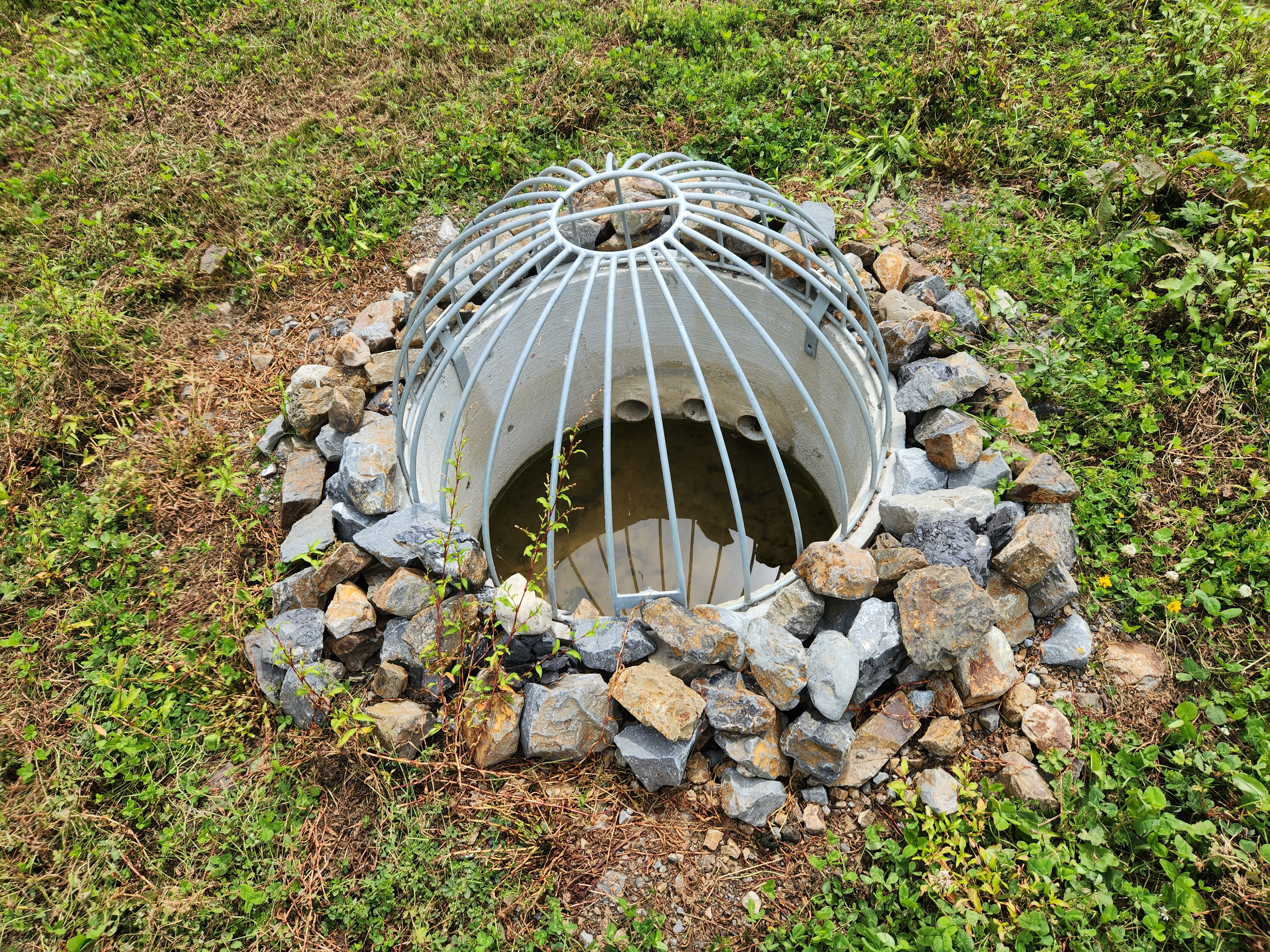
Scruffy dome in New Zealand.

A scruffy dome is a steel grille that is placed over the inlet of a manhole, and is usually dome shaped. They function as a way for stormwater to enter the pipe network without allowing larger debris in, such as people or animals. Scruffy domes are usually placed in parks and wetlands, and are usually made with galvanised steel.
