= Tree grate =

Metallic grating to avoid compacting of the soil near trees

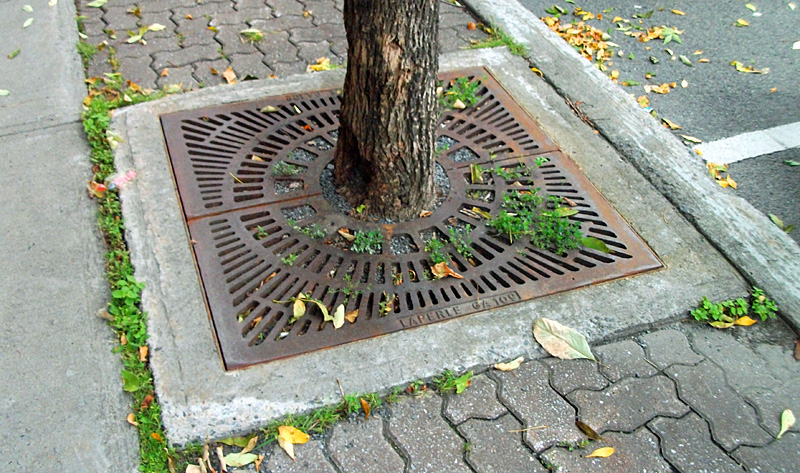
Tree grating in Salaberry-de-Valleyfield, Quebec, Canada

A tree grate is a metallic grating installed at the same level with the pavement around a tree that allows the soil underneath to stay uncompacted and pedestrians to walk near the tree without stepping on the soil. Grate slots allow tree roots to absorb air, sunlight, and water, meanwhile its soil is protected from pedestrian traffic impact. Tree grates create a protective barrier, providing uncompacted soil and development space for tree roots. They also serve as a decorative element along ceremonial streets, matching a street's design style and personality.
