= Blumenthal Arts =

Performing arts venue in North Carolina, US

- Interactive map of Blumenthal Arts
- Address: 130 North Tryon St. (Blumenthal Arts Center); 430 South Tryon St. (Levine Center for the Arts); 904 Post St. (Blume Studios); Charlotte, North Carolina; United States
- Coordinates: 35.227147°N 80.841463°W
- Owner: Knight Theater: Wells Fargo; Blume Studios: Charlotte Pipe and Foundry
- Capacity: Belk Theater: 2,097; Knight Theater: 1,193; McGlohon Theatre: 716; Booth Playhouse: 434; Stage Door Theater: 172; Duke Energy Theater: 190
- Type: Performing arts center

Construction
- Opened: 1992 (Blumenthal Arts Center); 2009 (Knight Theater); 2024 (Blume Studios)
- Closed: 2021 (Spirit Square)
- Architects: César Pelli (Blumenthal); J. M. Michael (Spirit Square) tvsdesign (Knight Theatre)

Website
- www.blumenthalarts.org

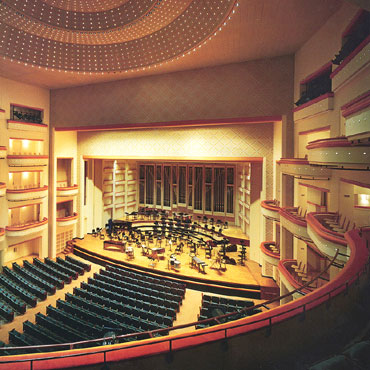
Belk Theater

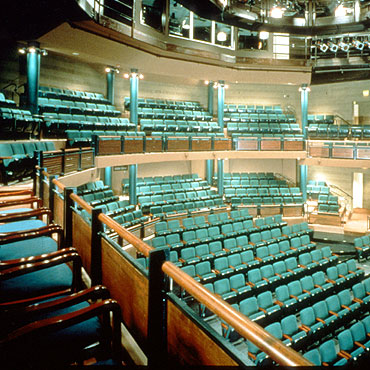
Booth Playhouse

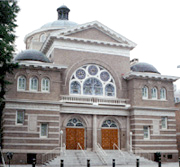
McGlohon Theatre

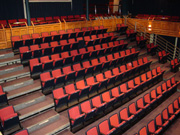
Duke Energy Theater

Blumenthal Arts is a not-for-profit, multi-venue performing arts complex located in Charlotte, North Carolina. Opening in November 1992, Blumenthal owns and operates 4 theaters on 2 campuses as well as an immersive event space in Uptown Charlotte.

== History ==
In 2012, Blumenthal launched the Blumey Awards, the regional high school musical theatre award program in the Charlotte metropolitan area. Winners of the "Best Actor" and "Best Actress" award compete annually in the national Jimmy Awards program on Broadway. Notable alumni of this program include Reneé Rapp, Eva Noblezada, and Liam Pearce.

During the COVID-19 pandemic, Blumenthal Arts debuted "Immersive Van Gogh" in Charlotte's Camp North End district. Running from June 2021 to January 2022, the exhibit ran for over 1,600 performances and had over 300,000 attendees. On January 23, 2024, Blumenthal Performing Arts announced their rebrand to Blumenthal Arts.

After the success of the "Immersive Van Gogh" experience at Camp North End, Blumenthal began renting and renovating a warehouse formerly operated by Charlotte Pipe and Foundry to create a space dedicated to hosting similar immersive experiences. This culminated with the opening of Blume Studios in September 2024, with Space Explorers: The Infinite serving as its inaugural experience.

== Venues ==
=== Blumenthal Arts Center ===
==== Belk Theater ====
The Belk Theater is the largest venue in the Blumenthal Arts Center, seating 2,118 at its full-capacity configuration. It Theater hosts a majority of the performances from Broadway tours and resident companies. Opening in 1992, it was designed by architect Cesar Pelli in a contemporary European horseshoe arrangement. The most distant seat is less than 135 feet from the stage. Features an LED fiber optic chandelier with 2,400 points of light in the audience chamber.

==== Booth Playhouse ====
The Booth Playhouse is a courtyard-style proscenium theater with cabaret and theater-in-the-round capabilities. It contains 434 seats with seating in orchestra and gallery levels. It hosts a variety of dance, choral and other musical ensembles, as well as meetings, seminars, and workshops.

==== Stage Door Theater ====
The Stage Door Theater is a black box-style theater which can seat up to 233 people with flexible layouts. Located at the stage door to the Blumenthal Arts Center, it is the organization's smallest venue.

=== Levine Center for the Arts ===
==== Knight Theater ====
The Knight Theater is a proscenium theater with a capacity of 1,192. Adjacent to the Bechtler Museum of Modern Art. Portions of the 2012 film, The Hunger Games, were filmed at the theater.

=== Blume Studios ===
Opening in 2024, Blume Studios is a multi-use warehouse complex located on the edge of Uptown. Formerly operated by Charlotte Pipe and Foundry, the complex is made up of 2 main buildings, known as "stages". Stage 1, the main building, is used to host major immersive experiences and other multi-media events. Stage 2 is used to host smaller shows and other smaller experiences.

=== Spirit Square (under renovation) ===
==== McGlohon Theatre ====
Opening in 1980 at the First Baptist Church, the McGlohon Theatre was later converted to a proscenium theater with a capacity of 716. It consists of an orchestra and balcony level.

==== Duke Energy Theater ====
The Duke Energy Theater is a black box theater with a capacity of 190.

=== Ovens Auditorium ===
Ovens Auditorium is Charlotte's largest performing arts theater with a capacity of over 2,400. Located at the Bojangles Entertainment Complex east of Uptown Charlotte, it features extended Broadway engagements and concerts. Owned by the City of Charlotte and operated by the Charlotte Regional Visitors Authority (CRVA).

== Productions ==
Blumenthal Arts hosts various productions at their theaters, including Broadway national tours, concerts, comedians, dance performances, and shows from local resident companies. In 2022, Blumenthal Arts launched the annual Charlotte International Arts Festival, featuring art installations and performances in the Uptown and Ballantyne neighborhoods.

=== List of resident companies ===
- Charlotte Symphony Orchestra
- Charlotte Ballet
- Opera Carolina
- Tosco Music
