= Register (air and heating) =

Ventilation grill with moving parts

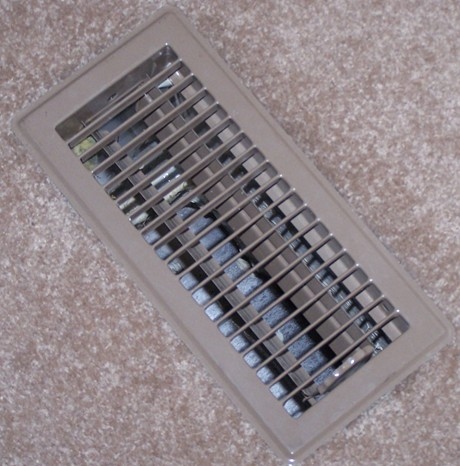
A floor register.

A register is a grille with moving parts, capable of being opened and closed and the air flow directed, which is part of a building's heating, ventilation, and air conditioning (HVAC) system. The placement and size of registers is critical to HVAC efficiency. Register dampers are also important, and can serve a safety function.

== Terminology ==
A grille is a perforated cover for an air duct (used for heating, cooling, or ventilation, or a combination thereof). Grilles sometimes have louvers which allow the flow of air to be directed. A register differs from a grille in that a damper is included. However, in practice, the terms grille, register, and return are often used interchangeably, and care must be taken to determine the meaning of the term used.

== Register size and placement ==
Placement of registers is key in creating an efficient HVAC system. Usually, a register is placed near a window or door, which is where the greatest heat/cooling loss occurs. In contrast, returns (grilled ducts which suck air back into the HVAC system for heating or cooling) are usually placed in the wall or ceiling nearest the center of the building. Generally, in rooms where it is critical to maintain a constant temperature two registers (one placed near the ceiling to deliver cold air, and one placed in the floor to deliver hot air) and two returns (one high, one low) will be used. HVAC systems generally have one register and one return per room.

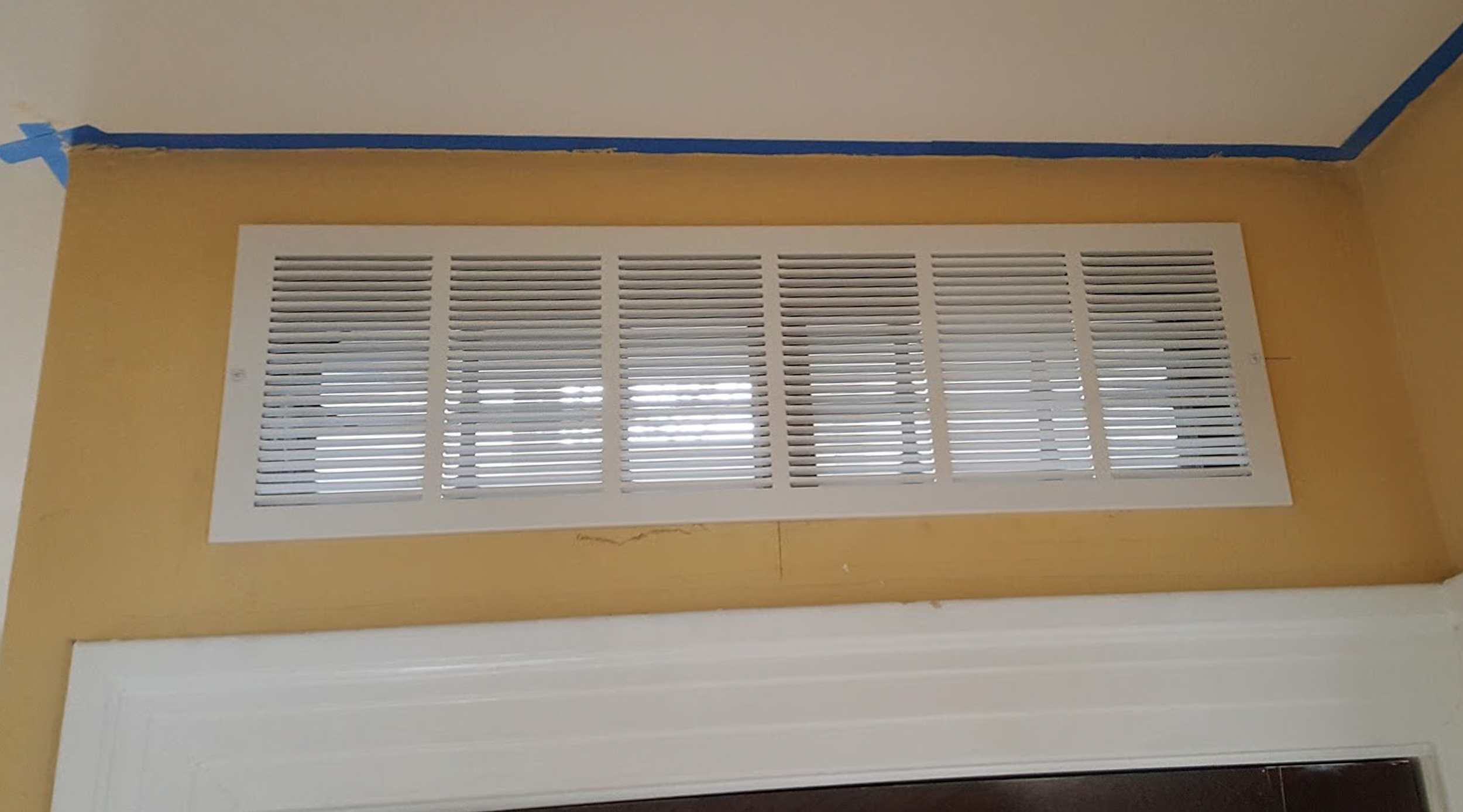
An unlouvered wall register, which allows circulation of air from one floor to another.

Registers vary in size with the heating and cooling requirements of the room. If a register is too small, the HVAC system will need to push air through the ducts at a faster rate in order to achieve the desired heating or cooling. This can create rushing sounds which can disturb occupants or interfere with conversation or work (such as sound recording). The velocity of air through a register is usually kept low enough so that it is masked by background noise. (Higher ambient levels of background noise, such as those in restaurants, allow higher air velocities.) On the other hand, air velocity must be high enough to achieve the desired temperature. Registers are a critical part of the HVAC system. If not properly installed and tightly connected to the ductwork, air will spill around the register and greatly reduce the HVAC system's efficiency. Ideally, a room will have both heating and cooling registers. In practice, cost considerations usually require that heating and cooling be provided by the same register. In such cases, heating most often takes precedence over cooling, and registers are usually found close to the floor.

For heating purposes, a floor register is preferred. This is because hot air rises, and as it cools it falls. This creates good air circulation in a room, and helps to maintain a more even temperature as hot and cold air is mixed more thoroughly. Floor registers generally have a grille strong enough for a human being to walk on without damaging the grille. It is rare to find a floor register installed less than 6 inches (15 cm) from the corner of a room. When a floor register is not practical or desired, a wall register is used. The correct placement of wall heating registers is critical. Generally, the heating register will be directly across from an exterior window. The hot air from the register will mix with the cold air coming off the window, cool, and drop to the floor—creating good air circulation. However, the hot air must be pushed from the register with enough force (or "throw") so that it will cross the room and reach the window. If there is too little throw, the hot air will stop moving partway across the room, the cold air from the window will not be heated (creating the feeling of a cool draft), and air circulation will suffer.

== Register dampers ==
A register's damper provides a critical function. Primarily, the damper allows the amount of hot or cool air entering a room to be controlled, providing for more accurate control over room temperature. Dampers also allow air to be shut off in unused rooms, improving the efficiency of the HVAC system. Dampers can also help adjust a HVAC system for seasonal use. During winter months, for example, an air conditioning register can be closed to prevent cold air from being pulled from the room. This allows the hot air to mix more completely with the cold air in the room, improving the efficiency of the HVAC system. (The return should be efficient enough to draw off the cooler air.)

Some registers, particularly those in commercial buildings or institutions which house large numbers of people (such as hotels or hospitals) have a fire damper attached to them. This damper automatically senses smoke or extreme heat, and shuts the register closed so that fire and smoke do not travel throughout the building via the HVAC system.

== Bibliography ==
- Bolton, Lesley; Schmitt, Mark (2004). The Everything Homebuilding Book: Build Your Dream Home. Avon, Mass.: Adams Media. ISBN 9781593370374.
- Dearborn Home Inspection (2003). Principles of Home Inspection. Chicago: Dearborn Home Inspection. ISBN 9780793179510.
- Haines, Roger W.; Wilson, C. Lewis (2003). HVAC Systems Design Handbook. New York: McGraw-Hill. ISBN 9780071395861.
- Jefferis, Alan; Smith, Kenneth D. (2002). Commercial Drafting and Detailing. Albany, N.Y.: Thomson Learning. ISBN 9780766838864.
- Lester, Kent; McGuerty, Dave (2009). The Complete Guide to Contracting Your Home. Cincinnati: Betterway Home Books. ISBN 9781558708716.
- Schwartz, max (1993). Basic Engineering for Builders. Carlsbad, Calif.: Craftsman Book Co. ISBN 9780934041836.
- Stamper, Eugene; Koral, Richard L. (1979). Handbook of Air Conditioning, Heating and Ventilating. New York: Industrial Press. ISBN 9780831111243.
- Stein, Benjamin; McGuinness, William J. (1997). Building Technology: Mechanical and Electrical Systems. New York: J. Wiley and Sons. ISBN 9780471593195.
- Sugarman, Samuel C. (2005). HVAC Fundamentals. Lilburn, Ga.: Fairmont Press. ISBN 9780881734898.
- Watt, John R.; Brown, Will K. (1997). Evaporative Air Conditioning Handbook. Lilburn, Ga.: Fairmont Press. ISBN 9780137485192.
