= Grille (architecture) =

Grid of slits in a barrier that allows passage of fluids but not objects

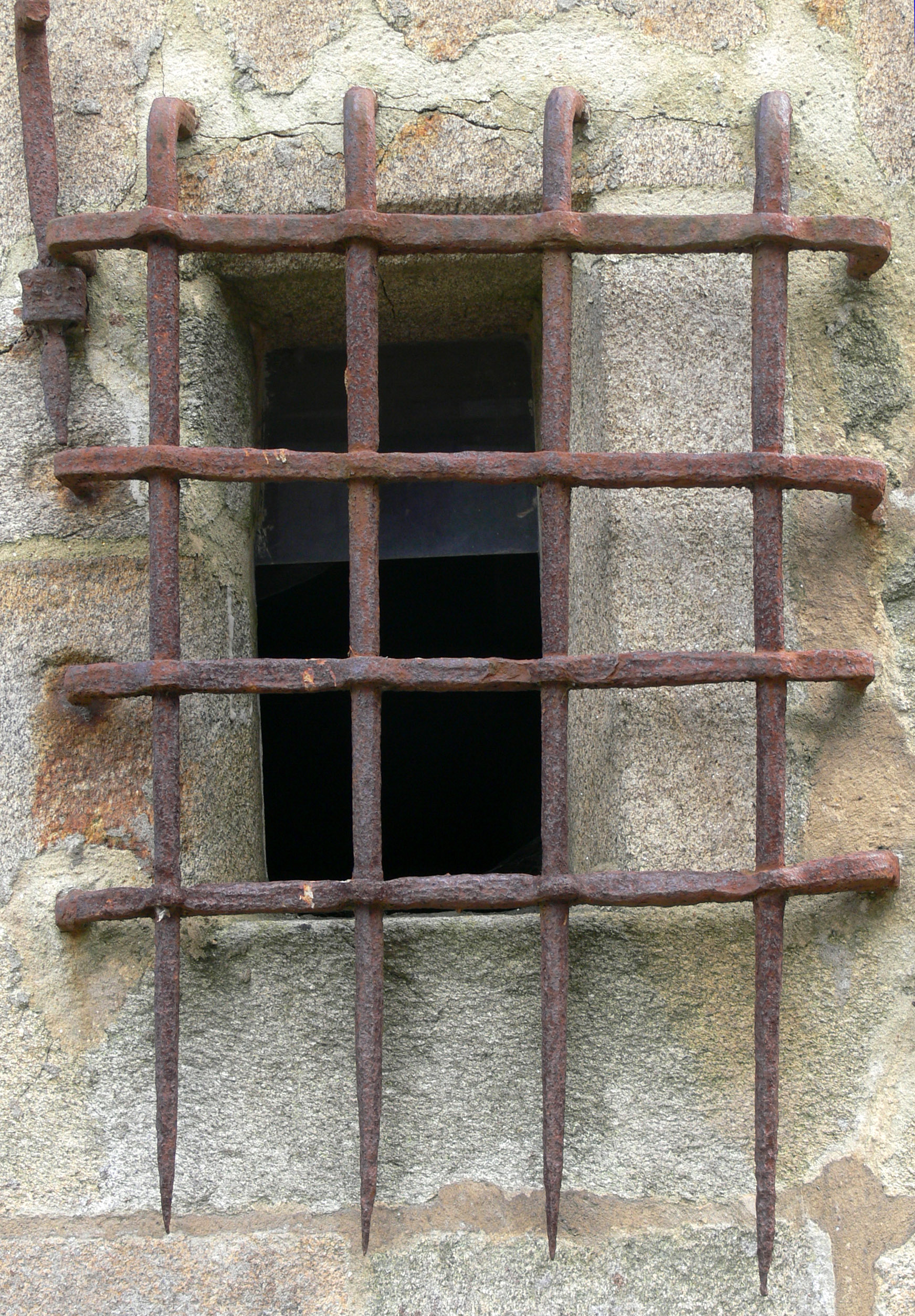

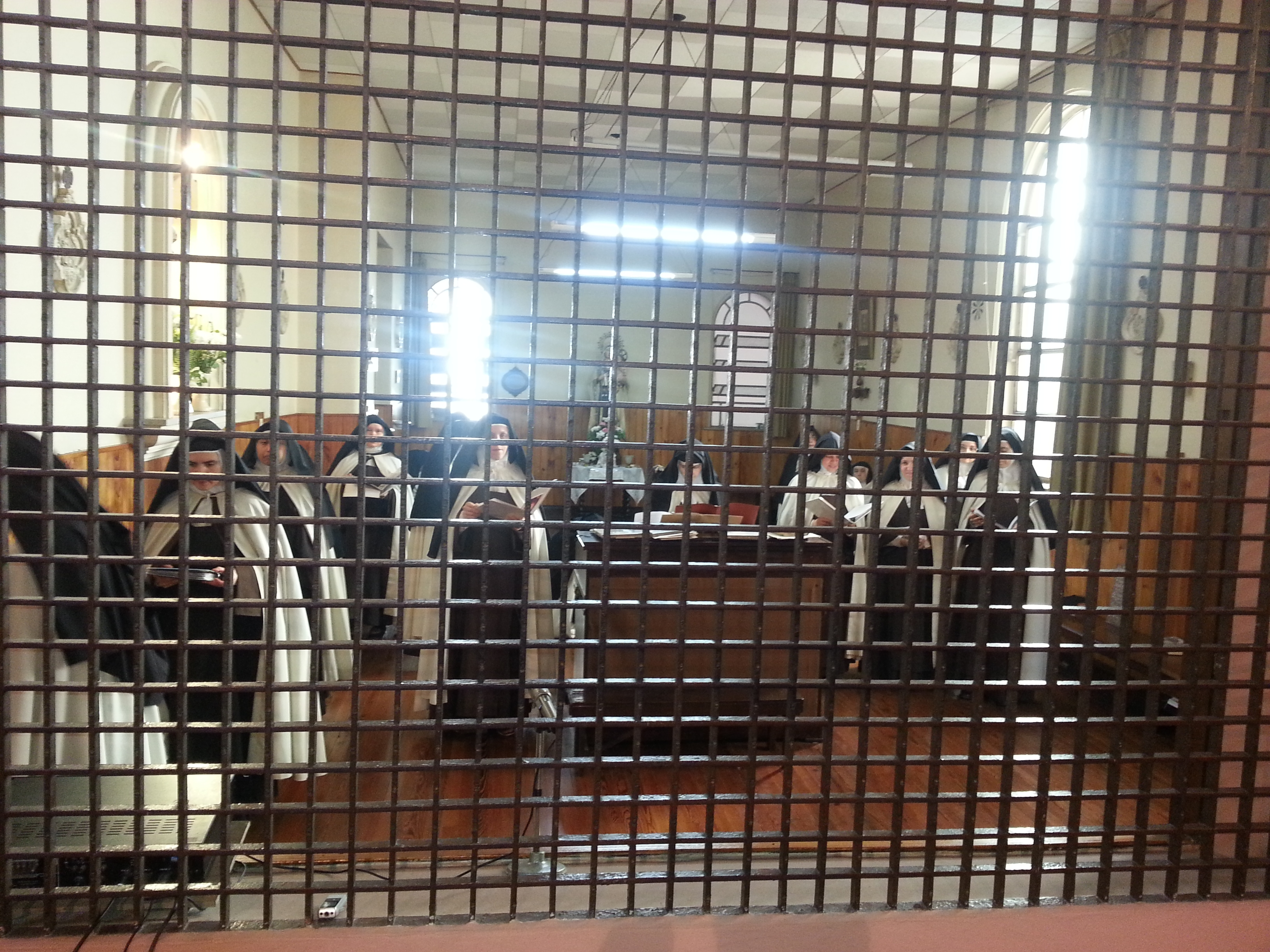
The grille at the choir of the Discalced Carmelite convent of Santa Teresa de Jesús in Buenos Aires

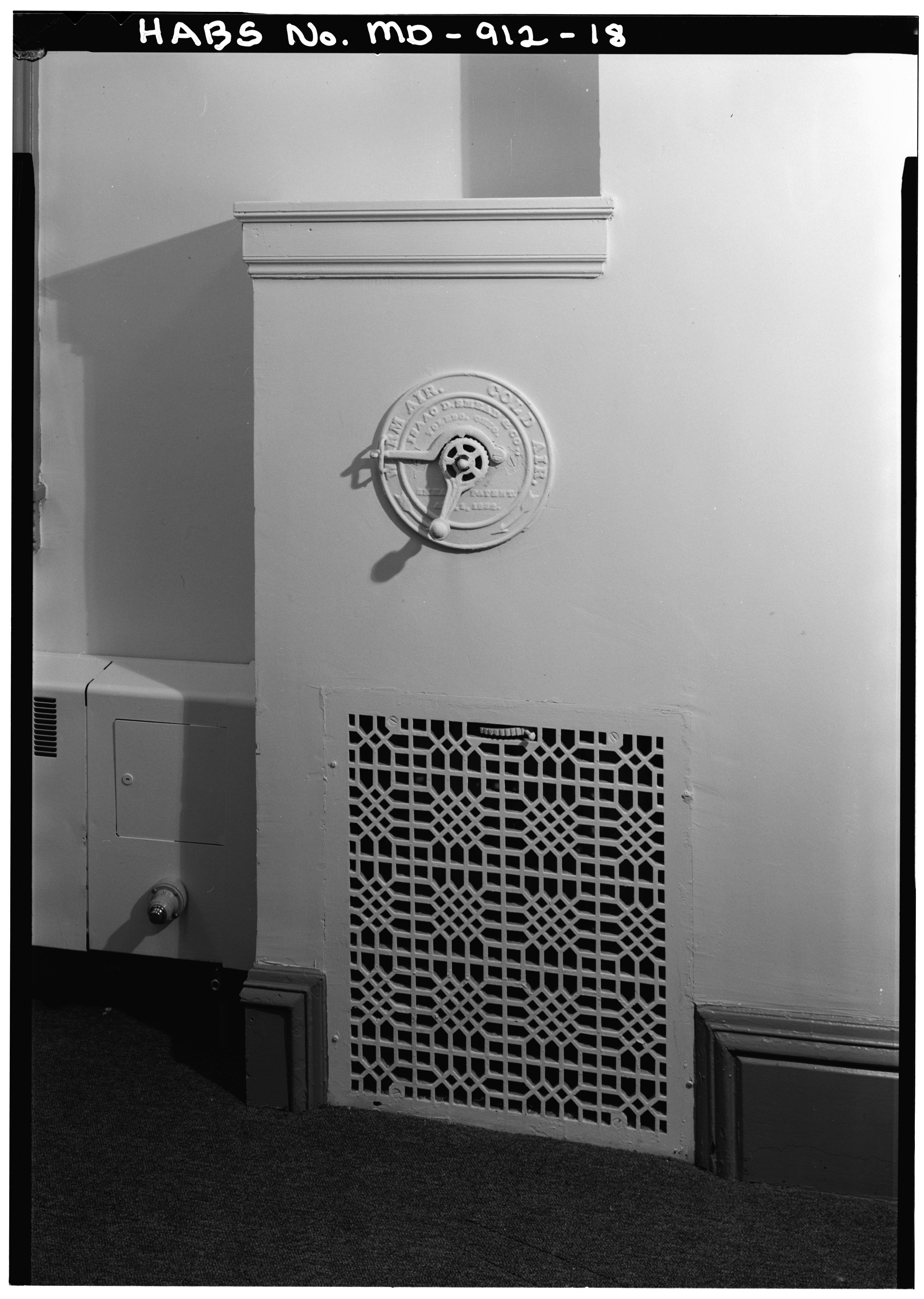
Grille, and control for an air duct

A grille or grill (French word from Latin craticula, small grill) is an opening of several slits side-by-side in a wall, metal sheet or another barrier, usually to allow air or water to enter and/or leave and prevent larger objects (such as animals) from going in or out.

A similar definition is "a French term for an enclosure in either iron or bronze."

== Register vs. grille ==
In heating, cooling, ventilation, or a combination thereof, a grille is a perforated cover for an air duct. Grilles sometimes have louvers which allow the flow of air to be directed.

A register differs from a grille in that a damper is included. However, in practice, the terms "grille", "register", and "return" are often used interchangeably, and care must be taken to determine the meaning of the term used.

== Grillwork ==
Grillwork is decorative grating of metal, wood, stone, or other material used as a screen, divider, barrier, or as a purely decorative element. It may function as a window, either with or without glazing. Grillwork may also refer to grilles, decorative front ends of motor vehicles. Grillwork is sometimes referred to as simply as a grill or as grille, but the latter terms do not convey a decorative quality. These words are all derived from the Old French greille. Other terms are used to refer to such decorative work. If the screen is made from iron, the term ironwork is often used. The term in Spanish, reja can also refer to metal fences. If the screen is made from cutouts of wood, the term fretwork is also used.

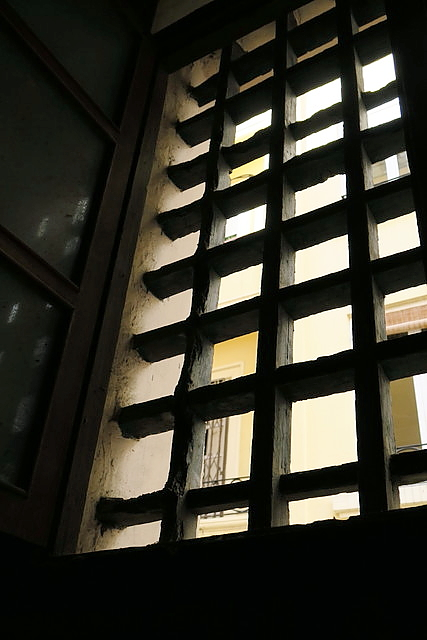
A wooden window grill in Plaza del Conde del Real, Valencia. The structure was probably used as a stable.

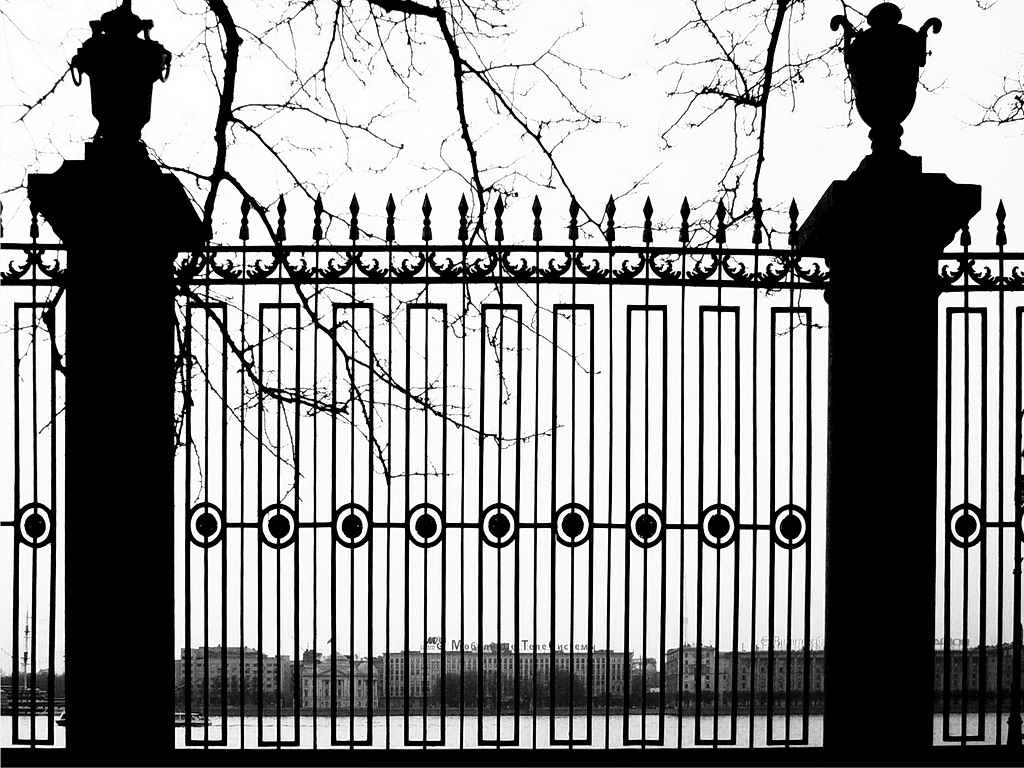
The 18th-century fence of Summer Garden in St. Petersburg is a recurring subject in Russian poetry and art.

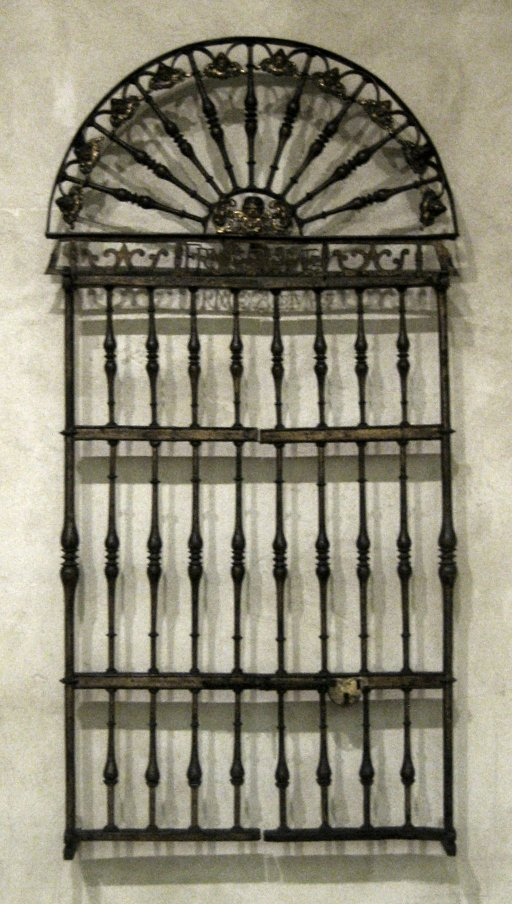
Spanish 17th century wrought iron and bronze grillwork by Francisco Gonzales, Metropolitan Museum of Art

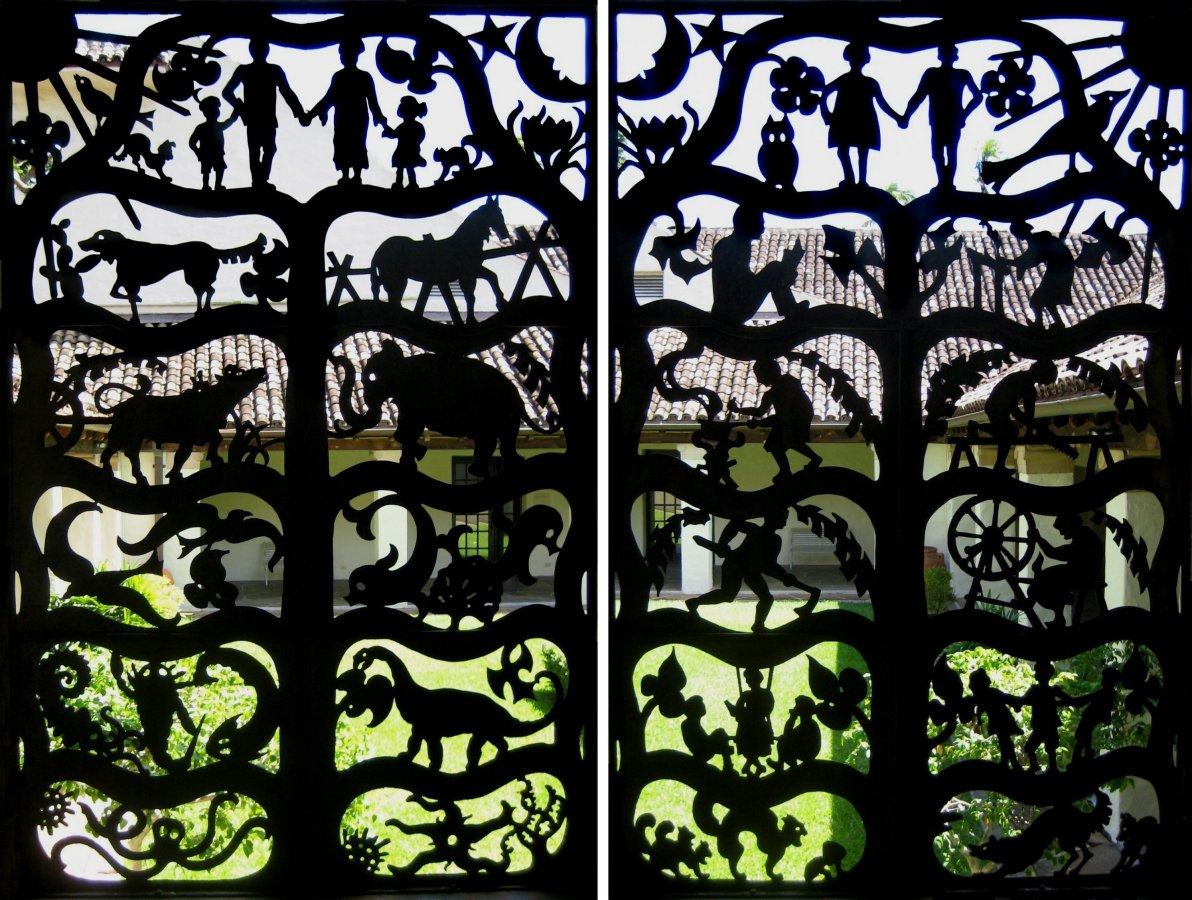
Early 20th-century American grillwork, anonymous, Honolulu Museum of Art

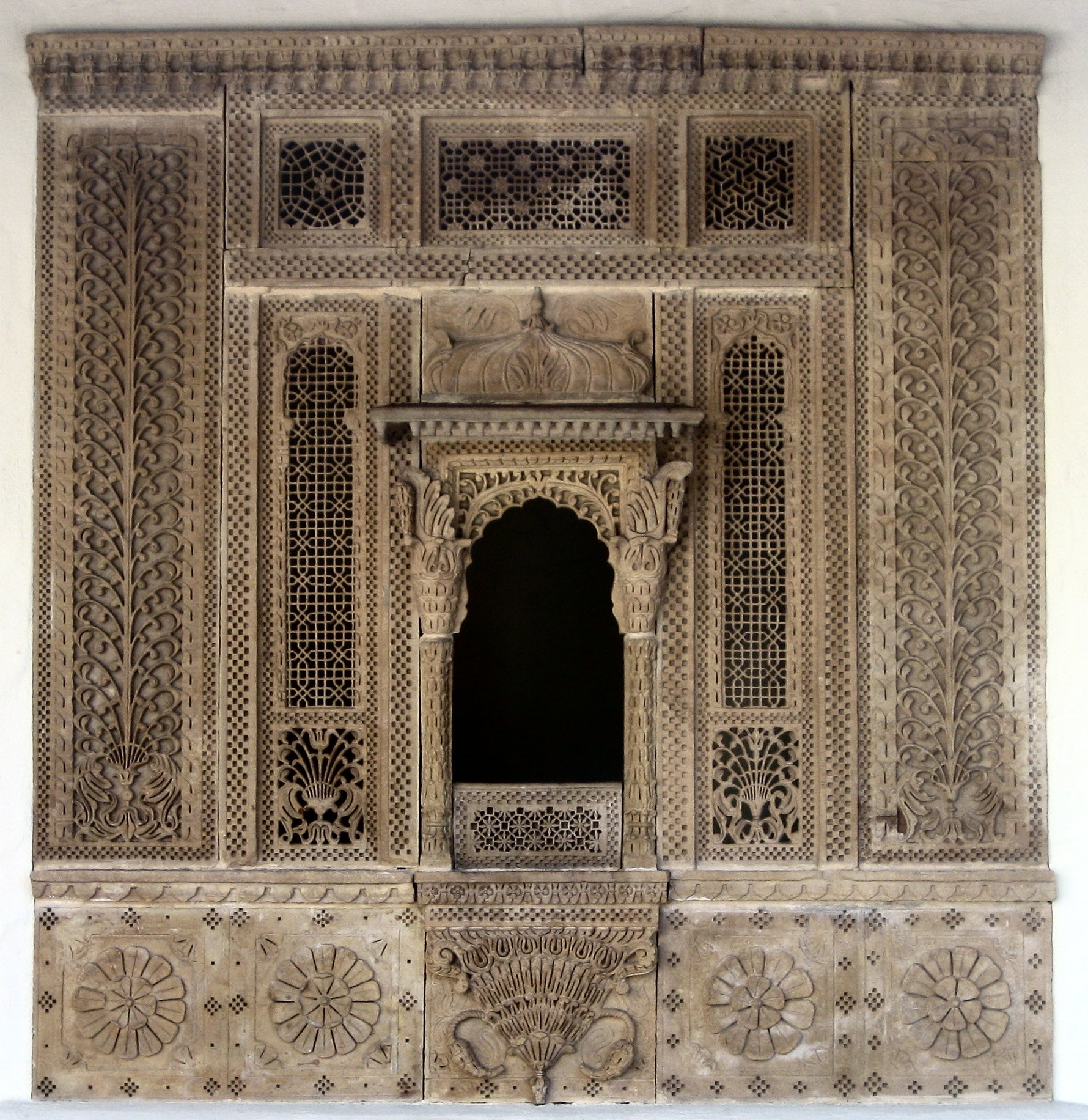
Architectural stone grillwork from a house in northern India, Rajput Dynasty, 17th-18th century, Honolulu Museum of Art

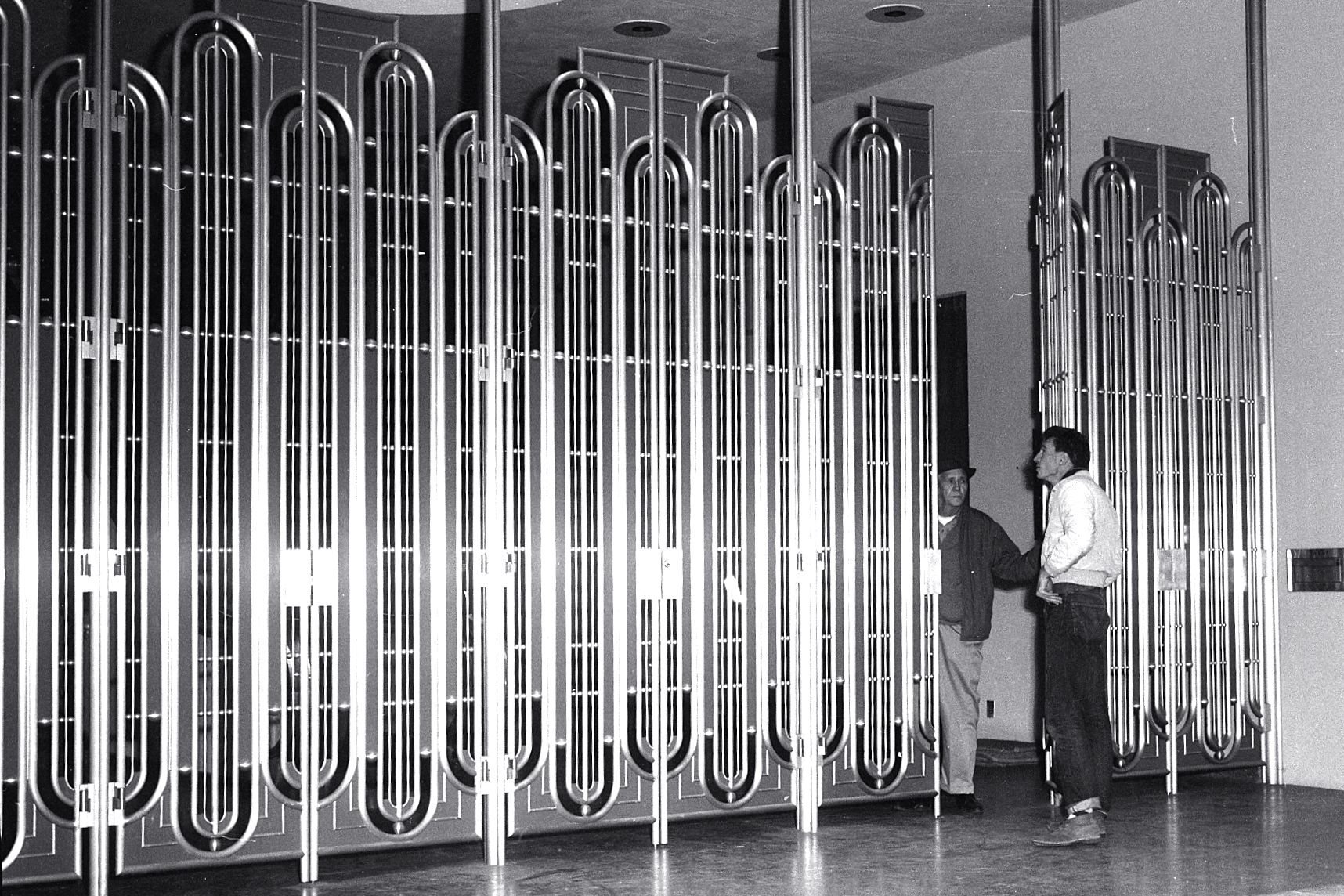
Marin County, California, Civic Center, 1963.

== See also ==
- Register (air and heating)
