= Charlotte Pipe and Foundry Company =

US iron casting and pipe manufacturing company

Charlotte Pipe and Foundry Company is an American iron casting and pipe manufacturing company.

== History ==
In 1901, piping and heating contractor W. Frank Dowd established the Charlotte Pipe and Foundry Company in Charlotte, North Carolina, United States. The foundry operated with 25 employees and cast iron soil pipes and fittings.

The company focused its efforts on iron casting for much of its early history. It mechanized its foundry operations in the 1950s. Following World War II, demand for plastic piping rose dramatically. The company studied the merits of producing plastic pipes, encouraged by the alteration of building codes to accommodate plastic pipes, opened a facility to produce them in 1967 in Union County. In 1992, the firm began producing industrial plastics.

In 2022 the company purchased Neenah Foundry, an iron castings firm based in Wisconsin. In 2023 the company relocated its main foundry operations out of Charlotte to a new facility in Oakboro, North Carolina.

== Operations ==
Charlotte Pipe and Foundry Company is a privately held company headquartered in Charlotte. It operates a foundry in Oakboro, North Carolina and six plastics plants in the United States.
