= National Utility Contractors Association =

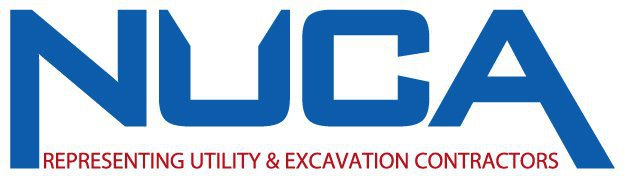
- NUCA logo since 2010
- Abbreviation: NUCA
- Formation: 1964
- Founders: Joseph M. Stone; Peter J. Ellis; Pat Marinelli; Antonio Marinelli; D.A. Foster; Laurence Siebe
- Type: Trade organization
- Legal status: Active
- Purpose: Representation of the utility construction and excavation industries
- Headquarters: Fairfax, Virginia
- Region served: United States
- Chief Staff Officer and Chief Advocacy Officer: Chris Barrett and Zack Perconti
- Website: NUCA.com

The National Utility Contractors Association (NUCA) is a trade association representing the underground utility industry in the United States. Founded in 1964, NUCA is the largest trade association for this industry in the country. It represents contractors, suppliers, and manufacturers involved in water, sewer, gas, electric, telecommunications, construction site development and excavation sectors of the industry.

NUCA is headquartered in Fairfax, Virginia, a suburb of Washington, D.C.

== History ==
NUCA was founded and incorporated on April 11, 1964 in the law offices of attorney Joseph M. Stone in Washington, D.C. The original founders of NUCA include Stone, Peter J. Ellis, Pat Marinelli, Antonio Marinelli, D.A. Foster and Laurence Siebel.

A jurisdictional dispute between union contractors and plumbers over utility pipe construction at Andrews AFB led to the association's April 1964 foundation. At the air base, located outside of Washington, D.C., The United Association of Journeymen and Apprentices of the Plumbing, Pipefitting and Sprinkler Fitting Industry of the United States and Canada had notified union members that all outside lines, including storm and sanitary sewer lines, must be handled by their union members. Many utility contractors were also told by other unions they were required to submit their job plans to the United Association for review, and that union would assign the work.

After an unfavorable NLRB hearing over the Andrews AFB dispute, attorney Stone wrote other local D.C. contractors outlining the reasons for an association for utility contractors. Stone had a concern that each contractor was fighting alone these larger legislative and regulatory battles. NUCA's founders believed that all of these factors posed a serious threat to utility contractors, and moved into action to sign articles of incorporation.

During the months that followed organizing documents, a logo, a newsletter (The Pipeline), and news announcements were prepared, all leading to a November 1964 meeting in New York City where the attendees agreed to expand the membership from the founding companies.

== Chapters ==
NUCA has 35 chapters, present in 23 states and the District of Columbia. This includes seven chapters in Florida, four in Texas, and two each in the states of Idaho, Virginia, and Washington.

=== List of chapters ===
- NUCA of Arizona
- NUCA of Colorado
- NUCA of Connecticut
- NUCA of Metro Washington (DC)
- NUCA of Florida
  - NUCA of North Florida
  - NUCA of Northwest Florida
  - Suncoast Utility Contractors Association (Tampa)
  - NUCA of South Florida
  - NUCA of Southwest Florida
  - NUCA of Central Florida
- NUCA of Hawaii
- NUCA of Indiana
- NUCA of Iowa
- NUCA of Greater Kansas City Region
- NUCA of Kentucky
- NUCA of Nebraska
- NUCA of Las Vegas
- NUCA of New Jersey
- NUCA of the Carolinas
- NUCA of Ohio
- NUCA of Oklahoma
- NUCA of Rhode Island/UCARI
- NUCA of Tennessee
- NUCA Texas
- NUCA of Virginia
  - Central & Southwest Virginia Utility Contractors Association
- NUCA of Washington
  - NUCA of Eastern Washington and North Idaho
- NUCA of Southern Idaho
- NUCA of Utah
- NUCA New York

== Initiatives ==
=== Clean Water Council ===
NUCA’s Clean Water Council is a part of NUCA's lobbying effort, established in 1991. Since its founding, the Clean Water Council has been a part of congressional testimony, hundreds of congressional meetings, letters to Capitol Hill, and published studies. It includes representation from 45 national organizations representing underground construction contractors, design professionals, manufacturers and suppliers, labor unions, and other companies, associations, and individuals. The Clean Water Council advocates for federal legislation and policies that will promote clean water and improve the nation’s infrastructure, with the ultimate goal of assuring safe, clean drinking water for all Americans.

=== Safety ===
NUCA's safety program offers individualized technical assistance from full-time Certified Safety Professionals on a full range of safety issues, including how to establish and implement a successful safety program and remain in compliance with Occupational Safety and Health Administration regulations. Training programs, such as NUCA's time-tested Train-the-Trainer and Crew Leader programs, combined with new programs such as the Damage Prevention Train-the-Trainer course and Advanced Crew Leader course for senior personnel, are offered to members and their employees. NUCA's Safety Department represents member interests with OSHA regulations, and works closely with other organizations to ensure the best practices in damage prevention. Additionally, there is an annual Safety and Damage Prevention Forum that brings safety professionals together for networking, advice on risk management and discussing safety problems.

=== Workforce Development ===
NUCA is working to attract and develop new entrants to infrastructure industry by improving the image of the industry and providing educational opportunities American youth. NUCA has pledged to work with public and private schools (K through 12), community colleges, trade schools, apprenticeship programs, and continuing adult education programs to develop and distribute utility construction and excavation curricula for students.

=== "We Dig America" slogan ===
NUCA has used their copyrighted "We Dig America" slogan since 1973. It originated at the association's 1971 convention. At that convention, following a rousing patriotic number by singer/dancer Jeanne Steel, humorist Don Rick came out on stage and uttered the famous words, "You guys really dig America!" The slogan became part of the NUCA logo in the late 1970s, and later became the title of a NUCA Award of Excellence, which is given annually to a nonmember who has made a significant contribution to the industry and/or association.

== Publications ==
NUCA distributes a variety of publications, including Utility Contractor Magazine, NUCA @ Work, the member-only NUCA Business Journal, NUCA Safety News and Clean Water Weekly, the latter of which is the official publication for the Clean Water Council. NUNCA is also a member of the newly formed Infrastructure Protection Coalition (IPC), which formed in 2021 comprising four other contractor associations. The IPC issued a nationwide report and 52 state reports entitled "811 Emergency" concerning a purported $61 billion in economic waste and inefficiency in the utility location sector.
