= Extreme Makeover: Home Edition season 9 =

Season of a television series

Extreme Makeover: Home Edition
- Season 9
- No. of episodes: 13

Release
- Original network: ABC
- Original release: September 25, 2011 – January 13, 2012

Season chronology
- ← Previous; Season 8 Next → Season 10 (on HGTV)

The ninth season of Extreme Makeover: Home Edition started on Sunday September 25, 2011 at 8e/7c. Four episodes aired before moving to Fridays starting with the October 21 episode. The season finale aired on January 13, 2012.

This is a list of season 9 episodes of the Extreme Makeover: Home Edition series.

== Episodes ==
No.	Title	Location	Original release date	Prod. code
189	"The Jubilee House / Marshall Family"	Fayetteville, North Carolina	September 25, 2011	904
The team surprises a woman, that has been a soldier, who takes in women that have been in the army, navy or other when they are homeless after when they have been divorced or live alone. One soldier had 2 sons, the owner of the Juilee House son has learning disabilities. First Lady Michelle Obama comes on the show, and a new designer, Sabrina Soto, comes on in. First appearance of Sabrina Soto
190	"The Gomez Family"	South Jordan, Utah	October 2, 2011	902
Jonah Gomez, a seven-year-old boy, was born with two different blood disorders. In fact, he is the only kid in the world that has two at the same time, and the only cure for him is a bone marrow transplant. Unfortunately, none of his relatives have the same match as Jonah does. So Ty and the team come to Utah and surprise Jonah, his sister, Ellie, and their mom. 5 people have a match right now.
191	"The Rucker Family"	Madison, Georgia	October 9, 2011	903
The team goes to Madison, Georgia to surprise nine-year-old Anaiah who saved her sister's life from an upcoming truck. Her sister survived, but Anaiah got hit. She had broken legs, a broken neck, spleen damage, and lost a kidney. The only thing that could save her was a leg amputation. The team received donated land, since the family's old land was not good and that's where the accident happened. The new house is wheelchair accessible.
192	"The Korpai Family"	Crawford, New York	October 16, 2011	907
The team goes to Crawford, New York to create a house for a family who has a daughter, Hailey, born with dwarfism. The parents are President and Vice President of the New York Chapter of Little People of America. Since it serves as a facility for the chapter, they need a house to accommodate little people visitors as well as their younger son, Hudson.
193	"The Keefer Family"	Etters, Pennsylvania	October 21, 2011	901
The team helps build a home for the family of a man who quit his job to take care of his paralyzed adult son.
194	"The McPhail Family"	Medford, Oregon	October 28, 2011	909
The team helps an Oregon couple with two autistic sons and who have devoted their lives to helping children with medical issues and started a local chapter of Sparrow Clubs.
195	"The Hill Family"	Ottawa, Kansas	November 4, 2011	905
The father of the family was nearly killed by a roadside bomb while serving in Iraq. Upon hearing loud noises, episodes of Post Traumatic Stress Syndrome can occur. The family's house is near a noisy rock quarry and train yard so the team helps them relocate. Note: Allen Hill died on June 23,2025
196	"The Dunning Family"	Lewes, Delaware	November 18, 2011	908
The team builds a new home and storage facility for a family devoted to providing food, shelter and support to those in need; game-show host Meredith Vieira and chef Michel Symon visit with additional surprises.
197	"The Walker Family"	Springfield, Massachusetts	December 2, 2011	910
The team visits a family, which includes an aunt and grandmother. Carl Walker killed himself because of bullying at school. The family can not bear being on the third floor of the current house as that is where he took his life. They need a new house on a different piece of land. They also have been lobbying for stricter laws on bullying. The Kardashian sisters and Demi Lovato guest star.
198	"The Johnson-Goslee Family"	Mardela Springs, Maryland	December 9, 2011	911
The team visits a family who had a tragedy last Christmas Eve when Wyzhir, a 15-year-old boy, chops his hand off while trying to fix up his house. He now has a prosthetic hand, but that does not stop him from helping others in his community. He has a dream to be a designer and Ty lets him stay for the first couple days of the build in order to fulfill his dream to design the family's house. This is the first time the show let someone from the family stay during the week.
199	"The Rhodes Family"	Columbus, Ohio	December 16, 2011	906
The team visits a family of 7 living in a 941 square foot home whose daughter was diagnosed with a deadly brain tumor.
200	"The Gibbs Family"	Fayette County, Iowa	January 6, 2012	912
The team travels to Iowa to help a widowed woman and her six children. Audrey Gibbs was left legally blind due to a brain aneurism seven months after her husband died. Brett Michaels guest stars.
201	"The Joplin Families"	Joplin, Missouri	January 13, 2012	913
In the 200th and final episode of the series, the team visits seven families in Joplin, Missouri, whose homes were destroyed by the 2011 Joplin tornado. Many of the families lost children. The team builds seven houses for these seven families in seven days. Sam Champion from Good Morning America covers the surprising of the families.

== See also ==
- List of Extreme Makeover: Home Edition episodes
- Extreme Makeover: Home Edition Specials
