= OWI =

OWI may refer to:

- United States Office of War Information
- "operating while intoxicated", "operating while impaired", see Driving under the influence#Terminology
- Owi Airfield, Schouten Islands, Indonesia; a WWII USAAF airfield of the South West Pacific Theatre
- Ottawa Municipal Airport (FAA identifier OWI), KS, USA
- Owiniga language (ISO 639 language code owi)
