= Ottawa High School =

Ottawa High School may refer to:

- Ottawa Township High School, a high school in Ottawa, Illinois
- Ottawa Senior High School, a high school in Ottawa, Kansas
