= Old Depot Museum =

History museum, Ottawa, Kansas

Coordinates: 38°37′14″N 95°16′11″W

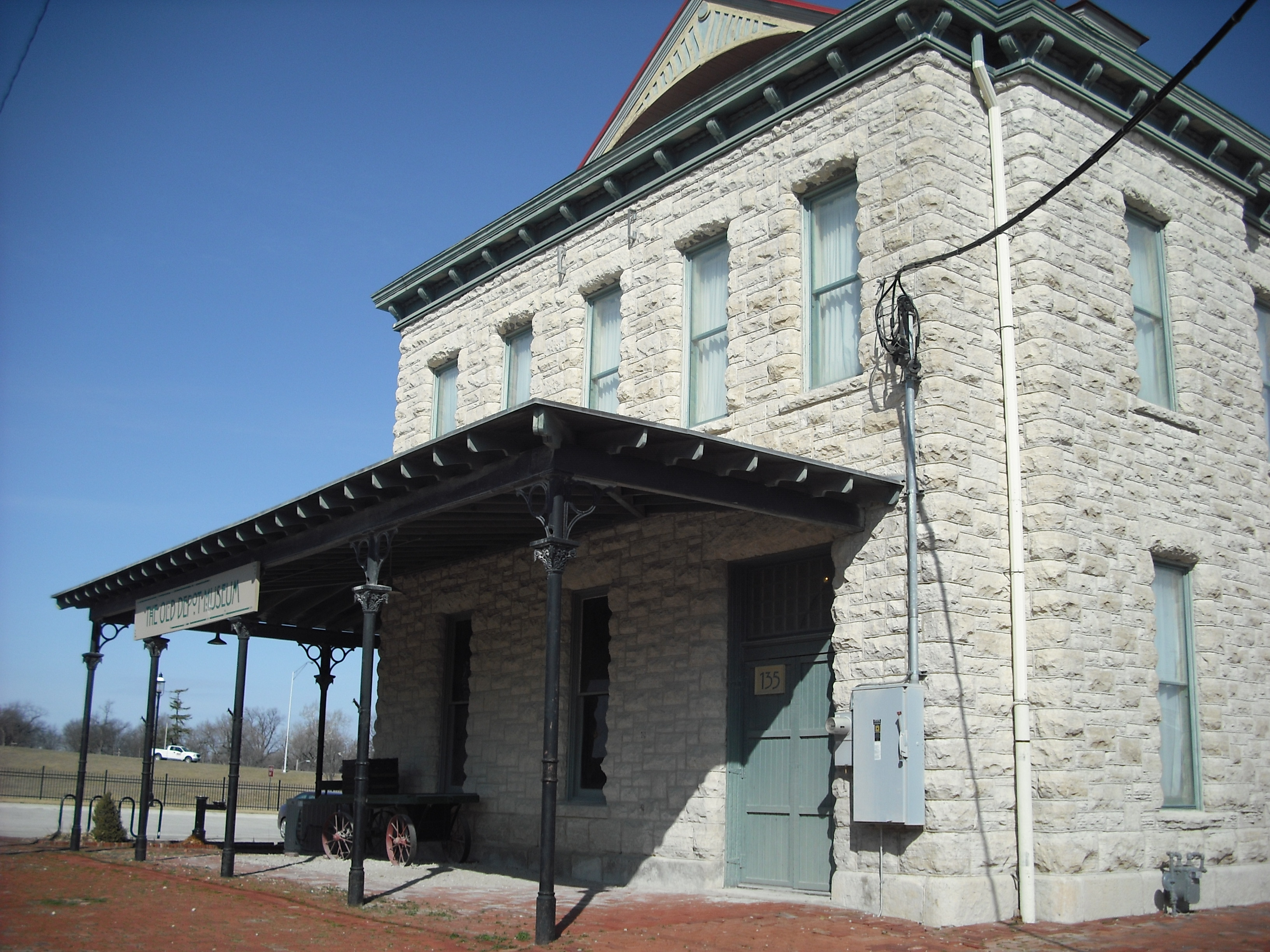
- Old Depot Museum Building
- Established: July 4, 1963
- Location: 135 West Tecumseh, Ottawa, Kansas
- Type: History museum
- Executive director: Diana Staresinic-Deane
- Owner: Franklin County Historical Society
- Website: http://www.olddepotmuseum.org

The Old Depot Museum is a history museum located in Ottawa, Kansas. The focus of the museum is primarily on the regional history of Franklin County, and the importance of trains to the development of small towns. It features history of local Native Americans, local industries, and has accurate recreations of historical rooms. The Old Depot Museum is on the National Register of Historic Places.

== History ==
The Leavenworth, Lawrence, and Galveston (LL&G) railway was the first railroad in Kansas to be built south of the Union Pacific railroad in Lawrence, Kansas. This railway was 30 miles long and connected Lawrence to Ottawa. It was constructed primarily by Chinese railroad workers from 1867 to 1868.

In 1873, the LL&G railway failed and was sold to the Kansas City, Lawrence, and Southern Kansas Railroad, who constructed a train depot in northern Ottawa in 1888. The depot was designed by George Washburn, and made with limestone from Cowley County. In 1895, the depot was sold to Santa Fe railway, who kept it until railroads fell out of popular use.

In 1962, the depot building was donated to the Franklin County Historical Society, who turned the building into a museum the following year. The museum opened on the 4th of July, 1963.

The museum received a grant from the ISTEA in 1996, and closed for three years to undergo major renovations.

In 2001, a high water marker was placed on the outside of the Depot to commemorate the Great Flood of 1951. The marker stands 9.8 feet (3.0 meters) high, the highest that the water of Marais des Cygnes river reached during the flood.

Preceding station	Atchison, Topeka and Santa Fe Railway	Following station
Princeton toward Tulsa	Tulsa – Kansas City	Ottawa Junction toward Kansas City
Terminus	Ottawa – Lawrence	Ottawa Junction toward Lawrence
Williamsburg toward Gridley	Gridley – Ottawa	Terminus

== Exhibits ==
=== Permanent exhibits ===
==== Model train ====
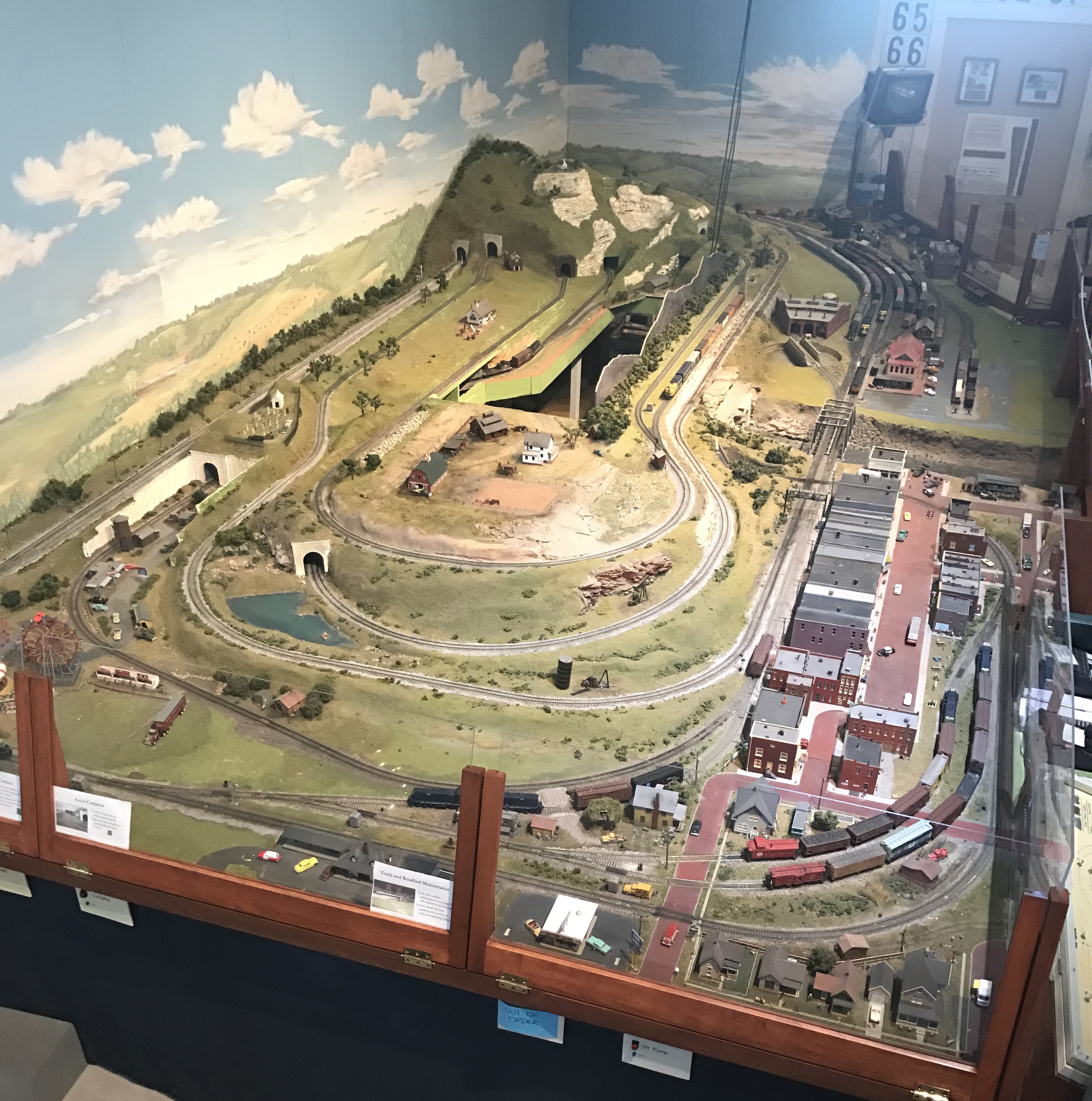
Model train display at the Old Depot Museum in Ottawa, Kansas

One room of the museum is dedicated to an HO scale model train, with both steam and diesel trains. The model train shows the railroad and Franklin County as it looked in the 1950s, and includes structures that exist around Franklin County.

==== Historic room recreations ====
The Old Depot Museum has historic room recreations that show what building interiors may have looked like in the Victorian era. This includes a parlor, a general store, a soda fountain, a dentist's office, and a one room school house.

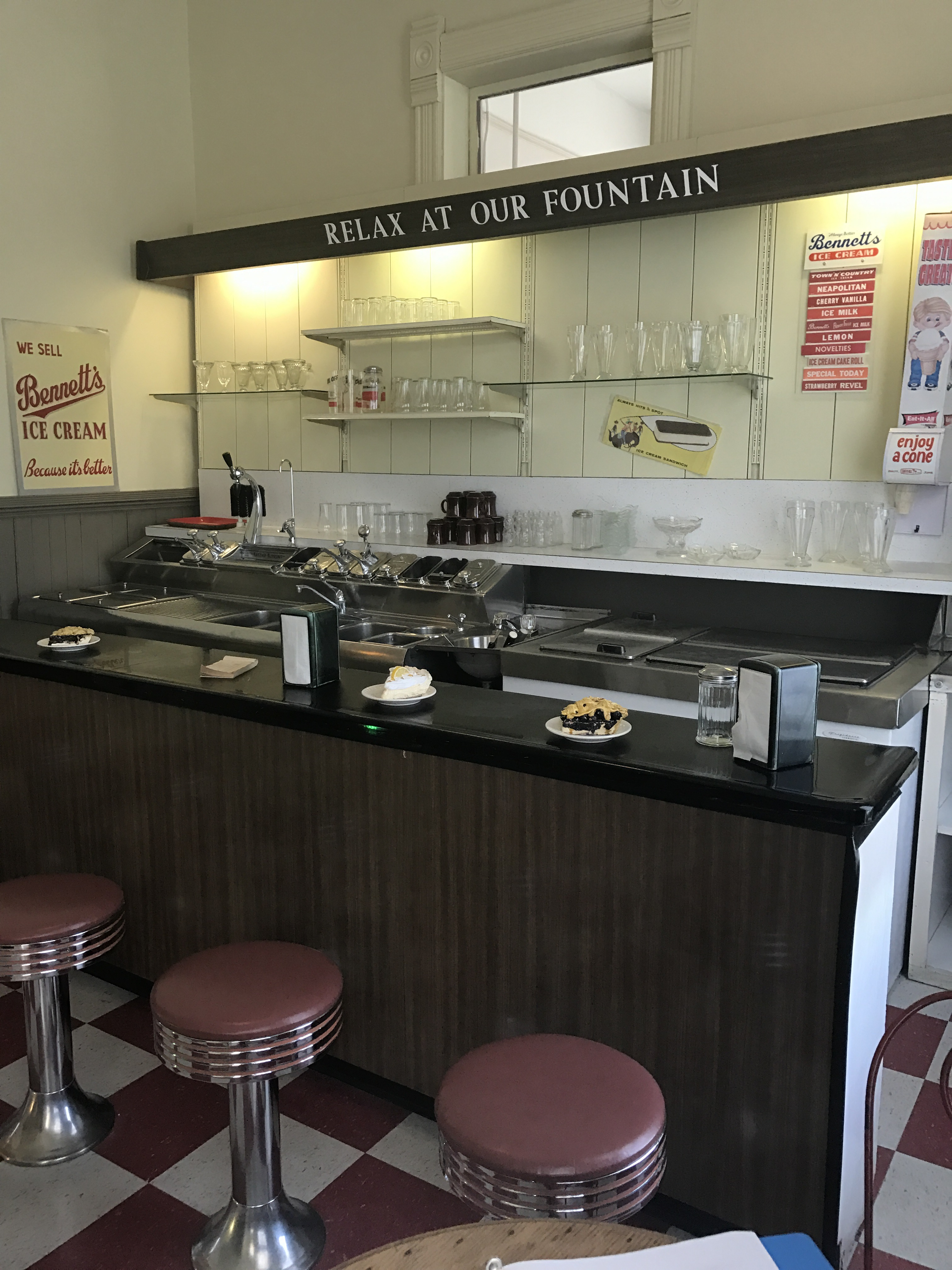
Recreation of Bennett's Creamery at the Old Depot Museum

The soda fountain display room is based on the Bennett Creamery, which was once a commercial shop in downtown Ottawa, Kansas.

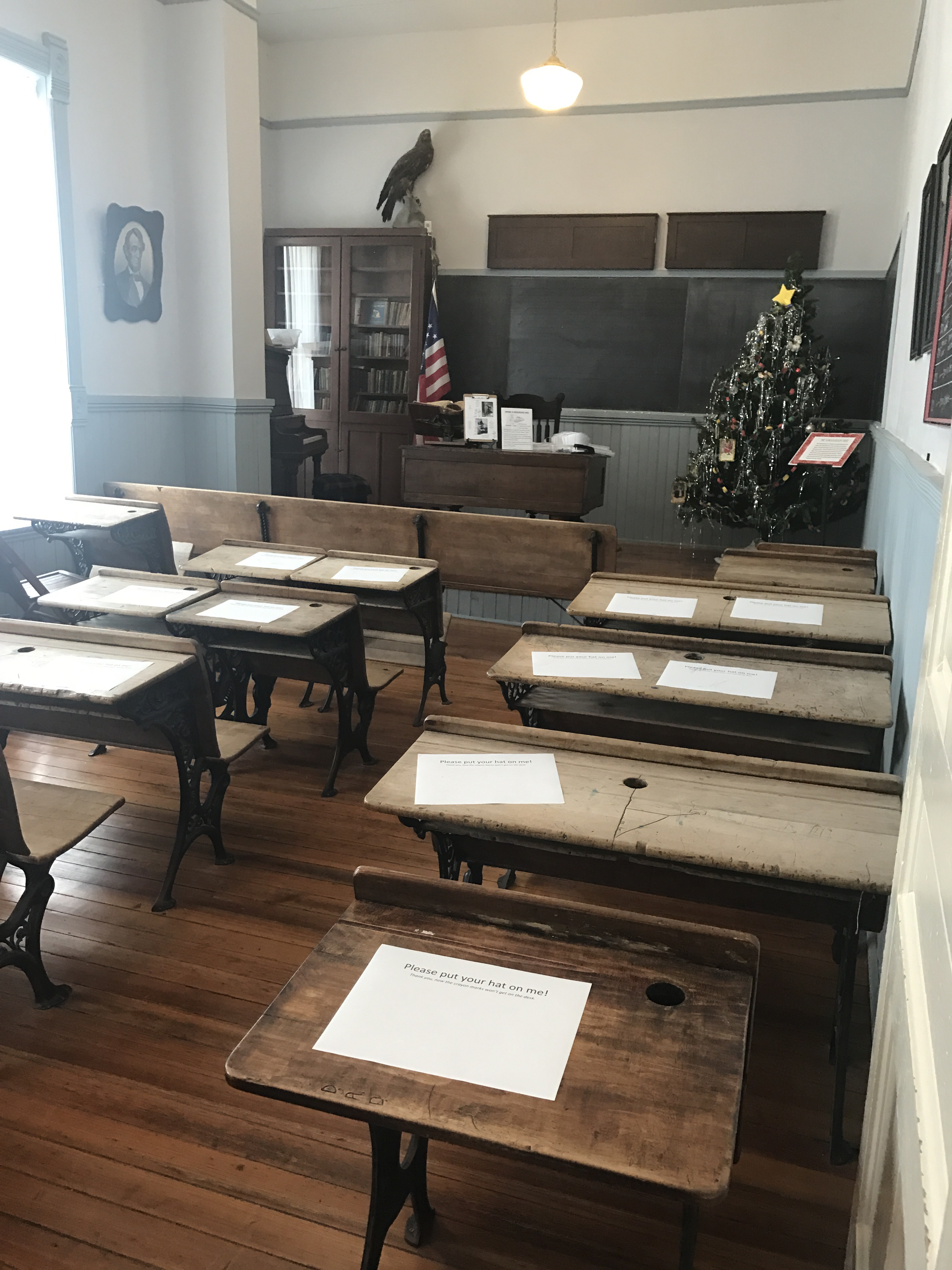
This is the recreation of a one-room school house in the Old Depot Museum, decorated for Christmas.

The one room school house is available to be booked for field trips, and students can come visit and experience what a school day would have been like in one room. Visiting children even wear pinafores and suspenders, clothing that children would have worn during the time of one room school houses.

==== Bleeding Kansas ====
One permanent exhibit is focused around abolitionist John Brown, and the Pottawatomie Massacre. This exhibit was created by Traub Design associates in 2007, and its creation was made possible through a grant from the Kansas Humanities Council. The exhibit involves an "immersive" element, in that instead of a traditional visual museum exhibit, visitors go into a dark room and listen to accounts from family members of people murdered in the massacre and people who supported the attack, recorded by voice actors.

==== Caboose ====
A caboose from the 1940s stands outside of the museum. It was donated by Ron and Deanna Kimes. The caboose was dedicated on Sunday, April 28, of 2013 in conjunction with an event that focused specifically on the history of Kansas railroad workers. The museum has considered adding a rail car to their outdoor exhibit as well, but are worried that it will be vandalized or damaged.

=== Temporary exhibits ===
==== Crossings ====
"Crossings: Getting Over, Around, and Through Water in Franklin County" is a temporary exhibit at the museum that opened on June 4, 2017, and will run through August 20, 2017. The exhibit explores the relationship that Franklin County has with water, especially the Marais des Cygnes river. A central feature of the exhibit is a 34-foot map of the Marais des Cygnes which encompasses the floor of the exhibit. The exhibit is part of a larger initiative to focus on the relationship between people and water, and was supported by a grant from the Kansas Humanities Council to achieve that goal.

==== Secret Societies ====
The Secret Societies exhibit at the Old Depot museum ran from August 14 to November 14 of 2016. The full title of the exhibit was “Secret Societies: The Search for Security, Knowledge and Fellowship in Ottawa and Franklin County.” The exhibit explored the purposes of various secret societies in Franklin County, although the overarching theme was about Franklin County residents searching for community. Some of the secret societies featured were either secret abolitionist groups, like the Danites created by James Lane, or pro-slavery groups.

A less seriously themed group was named the Esoteric and Terrible Order of Pie Eaters, which was a fraternity formed in 1868 in response to the Members of the Grange fraternity, which was more serious and exclusionary, and well known for eating cake. The Old Depot museum claimed that the views of the Pie Eaters fraternity were more far reaching than simply making fun of the Grangers, saying they also “had grand plans of doing away with currency and paying with pieces of glass, banishing all women to New Jersey, and achieving world domination while wearing pie plates around their necks and calling each other by titles like the ‘Grand Gyrasticutas’ and the ‘Grand Gabster.’" The museum hosted an event that included many of the Pie Eaters secret initiations, and served several types of pie.

==== Small-Town Ball ====
"Small-Town Ball: Playing America's Game in Ottawa and Franklin County" was an exhibit about local baseball teams in Franklin County. The exhibit included information about school teams, company teams, and competitive traveling teams. Along with the exhibit was a presentation by Phil S. Dixon about Negro Leagues Baseball and the Kansas City Monarchs. The Monarchs played in barnstorm games in Ottawa at least five times. The exhibit also featured a documentary screening of "Town Teams: Bigger than Baseball" at the local Plaza Cinema movie theatre, which focuses on the importance of small local baseball teams across Kansas.

==== George P. Washburn ====
In 2007, the Old Depot Museum had a temporary exhibit featuring George Washburn, the architect who designed the depot. Washburn designed several buildings in Ottawa, Kansas, and the museum hosted a guided tour of his buildings as the exhibit was going on.

==== Harvey Houses ====
In 2015, the Old Depot Museum had a special exhibit about Harvey Houses, restaurants that were created along railways by Fred Harvey. The depot in Ottawa never had a Harvey House of its own, but had a Harvey cart that served coffee and sandwiches. This exhibit also paired with the local Plaza movie theatre to show "Harvey Girls," a movie starring Judy Garland, about Harvey Houses and the women who worked in them.

==== Other temporary exhibits ====
- Franklin County Photographers
- Franklin County's Contribution to World War I and World War II
- Historic Textiles
- Founding of Ottawa
- Local Quilts

== Trails ==
The Old Depot Museum marks the beginning of the Prairie Spirit Trail. This trail is 53 miles long and follows what used to be a railroad track, which originally began at the Santa Fe Depot. This trail was Kansas' first "rail-trail."

The museum can also be a trailhead for the Flint Hills Nature Trail.
