= KOWI =

KOWI may refer to:

- Ottawa Municipal Airport (ICAO code KOWI)
- KOWI (FM), a radio station (101.3 FM) licensed to serve Oatman, Arizona, United States
- KNSL, a radio station (97.9 FM) licensed to serve Lamoni, Iowa, United States, which held the call sign KOWI from 2005 to 2012
