= KOFO =

- Ottawa, Kansas; United States
- Frequency: 1220 kHz
- Branding: KOFO 103.7 FM & 1220 AM

Programming
- Format: Country
- Affiliations: ABC News Radio

Ownership
- Owner: Brandy Communications; (Brandy Communications, Inc.)

History
- First air date: September 24, 1949

Technical information
- Licensing authority: FCC
- Facility ID: 6648
- Class: D
- Power: 250 watts day; 40 watts night
- Transmitter coordinates: 38°35′4″N 95°15′57.9″W
- Translator: 103.7 K279CS (Ottawa)

Links
- Public license information: Public file; LMS
- Webcast: Listen live
- Website: kofo.com

KOFO (1220 AM) is a radio station broadcasting a country music format. Licensed to Ottawa, Kansas, United States, the station is owned by Brandy Communications. The KOFO studios are located on Radio Road in Ottawa.
