= Ottawa USD 290 =

Public school district in Ottawa, Kansas

Address
- 1404 S. Ash St. Ottawa, Kansas, 66067; United States
- Coordinates: 38°35.7014′N 95°16.6962′W

District information
- Type: Public
- Grades: Pre-K to 12
- Established: November 12, 1864
- Superintendent: Ryan Cobbs
- Schools: 5

Students and staff
- Students: 2524
- Student–teacher ratio: 14:1

Other information
- Board of Education: BOE Website
- Website: usd290.org

Ottawa USD 290 is a public unified school district headquartered in Ottawa, Kansas, United States. The district includes the city of Ottawa and nearby rural areas.

== Administration ==
Ottawa USD 290 is currently under the leadership of Superintendent Ryan Cobbs.

== Board of education ==
The Ottawa Board of Education meets on the second and fourth Mondays, of each month, at the District Office.

== Schools ==
The school district operates the following schools:

- Ottawa High School
- Ottawa Middle School
- Sunflower Elementary School
- Garfield Elementary School
- Lincoln Elementary School

Closed

- Eisenhower Elementary School - closed in 2011
- Hawthorne Elementary School - closed in 2007
- Eugene Field Elementary School - closed in 2017

== See also ==
- Kansas State Department of Education
- Kansas State High School Activities Association
- List of high schools in Kansas
- List of unified school districts in Kansas
