= Ottawa, Kansas =

City in Franklin County, Kansas

- City and County seat
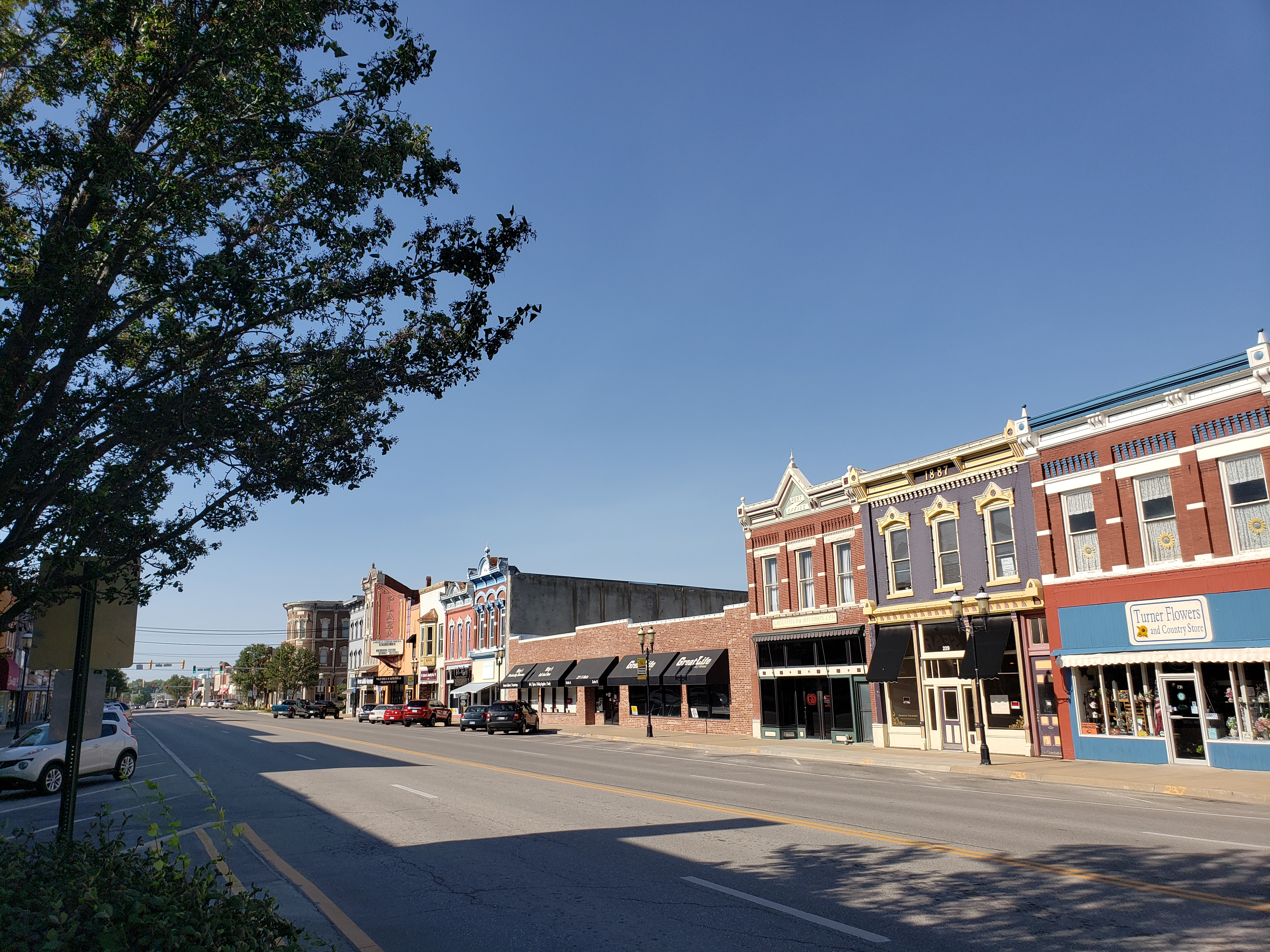
- Ottawa Historic District (2018)

- Location within Franklin County and Kansas

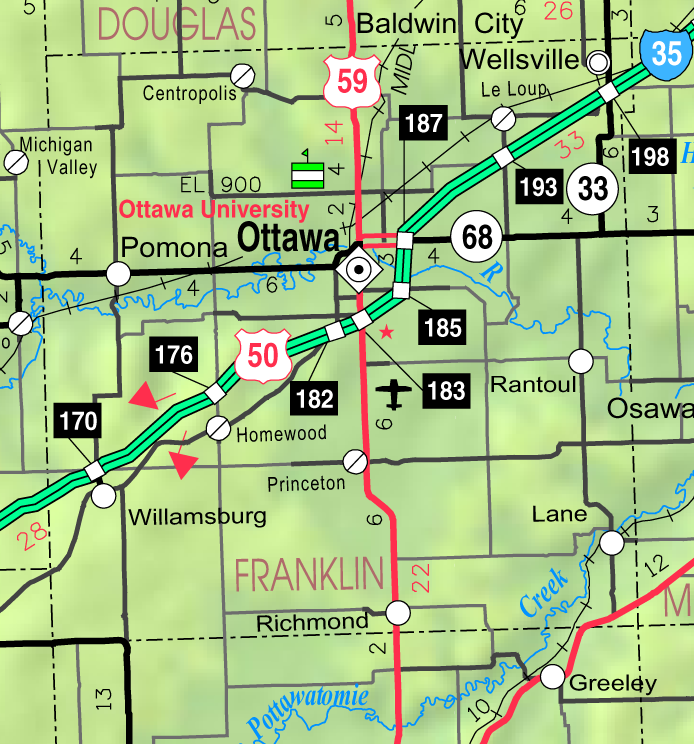
- KDOT map of Franklin County (legend)
- Coordinates: 38°37′22″N 95°14′07″W
- Country: United States
- State: Kansas
- County: Franklin
- Founded: 1865
- Incorporated: 1866
- Named for: Ottawa Tribe

Government
  - Type: Council-Manager
  - Mayor: Emily Allen
  - City Manager: Richard Nienstedt

Area
  - Total: 10.40 sq mi (26.94 km^{2})
  - Land: 10.32 sq mi (26.72 km^{2})
  - Water: 0.089 sq mi (0.23 km^{2}) 1.06%
- Elevation: 925 ft (282 m)

Population (2020)
  - Total: 12,625
  - Density: 1,224/sq mi (472.5/km^{2})
- Time zone: UTC-6 (CST)
  - Summer (DST): UTC-5 (CDT)
- ZIP Code: 66067
- Area code: 785
- FIPS code: 20-53550
- GNIS ID: 485638
- Website: ottawaks.gov

Ottawa (pronounced /ˈɒtəwɑː/) is a city in and the county seat of Franklin County, Kansas, United States. It is located on both banks of the Marais des Cygnes River near the center of Franklin County. As of the 2020 census, the population of the city was 12,625. It is the home of Ottawa University.

== History ==
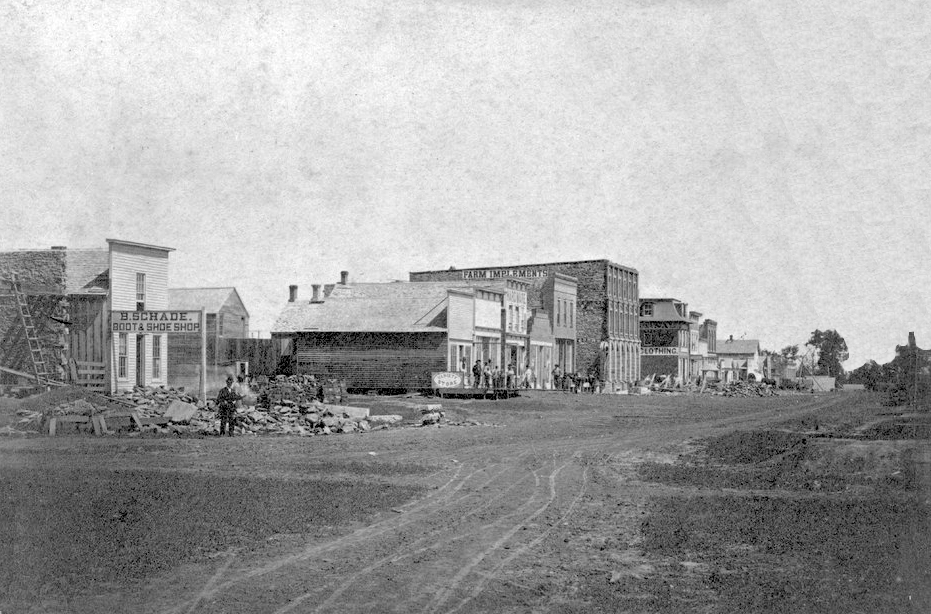
Main Street, circa 1865–1900

=== 19th century ===
The name derives from the Ottawa tribe of Native Americans, on whose reservation the city was laid out. In the spring of 1864, title to the land was obtained from the tribe through treaty connected to the founding of Ottawa University, the Ottawa having donated 20,000 acres of land to establish and fund a school for the education of Indians and non-Indians alike. The word Ottawa itself means "to trade". In 1867, the Ottawa tribe sold their remaining land in Kansas and moved to Indian Territory in Oklahoma.

Panoramic map of Ottawa from 1872 including inset images of Union School, the Ludington House, C.W Hamblins Block, and Ottawa University building

On the last day of March 1864, J.C. Richmond built the first non-Indian settlement in the new town, at the corner of Walnut and First streets.

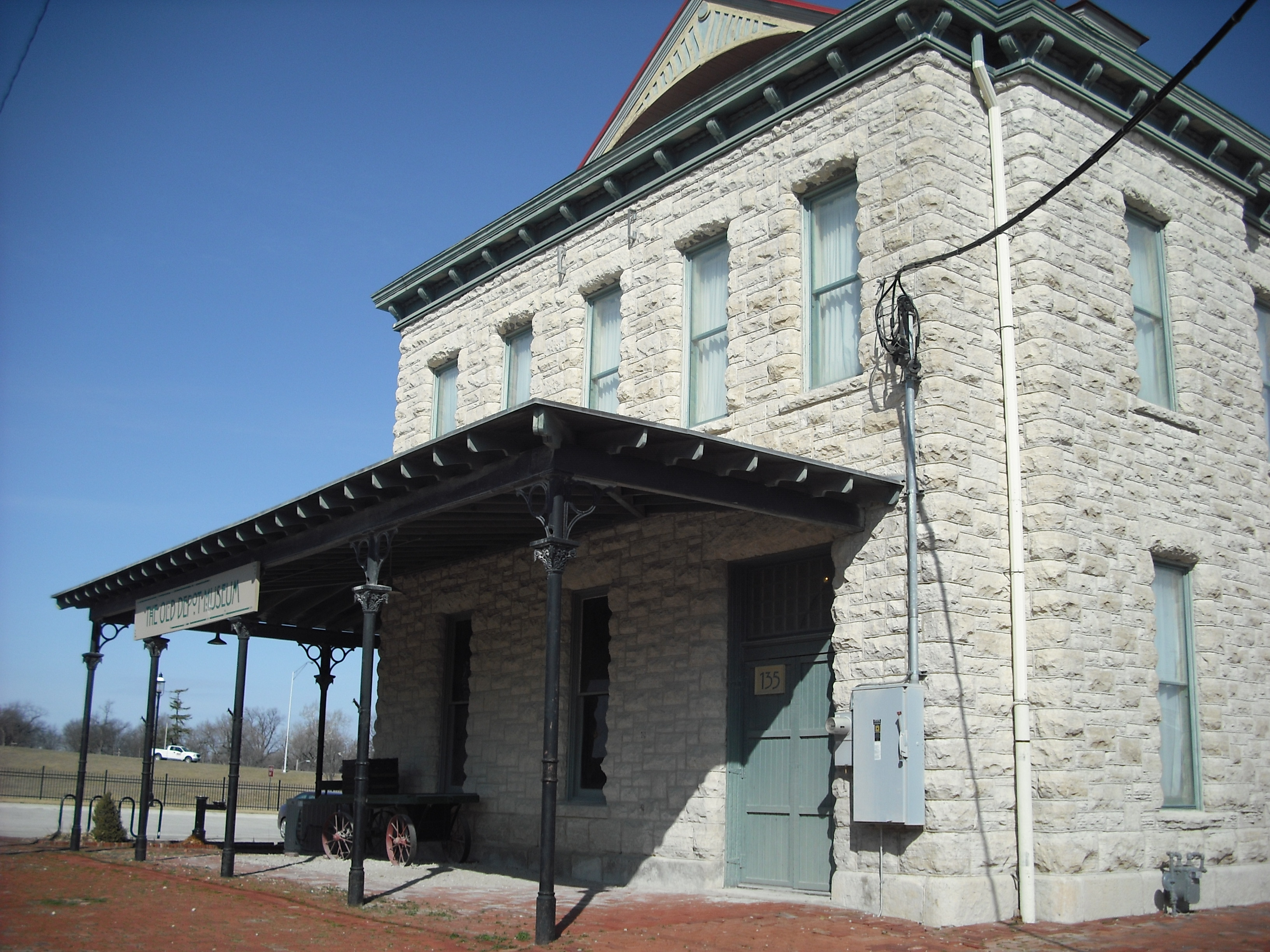
Old Depot Museum built in 1888 (photo from 2008)

=== Flooding ===
Ottawa has a history of flooding because of its location straddling the Marais Des Cygnes river. The area's first recorded flood was the Great Flood of 1844. In 1928, a flood crested at 38.65 feet and killed six people. Other flood years include 1904, when water crested at 36 feet and ran to a man's shoulders in the Santa Fe depot; 1909, cresting at 36.3 feet (11.1 m); 1915, cresting at 31 feet (9.4 m), and 1944, cresting at 36.5 feet (11.1 m).

However, it is the Great Flood of 1951 which is the most famous. It was about five inches higher than the 1928 flood. The flood of 1951 affected much of Missouri and Kansas and 41 people died. One-third of Ottawa was covered because of this flood.

It is unlikely Ottawa will suffer major damage due to a flood again thanks to a series of levees and pumping stations built by the U.S. Army Corps of Engineers in the 1960s, which is part of a larger system of flood systems to regulate the Marais Des Cygnes River to the Missouri River. The levees built along the river are inspected on an annual basis to ensure their quality.

=== 20th century ===
In 1943, German and Italian prisoners of World War II were brought to Kansas and other Midwest states to help solve the labor shortage caused by American men serving in the war. Large internment camps were established in Kansas: Camp Concordia, Camp Funston (at Fort Riley), Camp Phillips (at Salina under Fort Riley). Fort Riley established 12 smaller branch camps, including Ottawa.

== Geography ==
Ottawa straddles the Marais des Cygnes River and is located 58 miles (93 km) southwest of Kansas City at the junction of U.S. Route 59 and K-68. U.S. Route 50 and Interstate 35 bypass Ottawa to the south and east, while business US-50 passes through the city.

According to the United States Census Bureau, the city has a total area of 9.42 square miles (24.40 km^{2}), of which 9.32 square miles (24.14 km^{2}) is land and 0.10 square miles (0.26 km^{2}) is water.

=== Climate ===
The maximum temperature reaches 90 °F (32 °C) an average of 46.6 days per year and reaches 100 °F (38 °C) an average of 4.9 days per year. The minimum temperature falls below the freezing point (32 °F) an average of 111 days per year.

Climate data for Ottawa, Kansas (1991–2020 normals, extremes 1895–present)
Month	Jan	Feb	Mar	Apr	May	Jun	Jul	Aug	Sep	Oct	Nov	Dec	Year
Record high °F (°C)	76 (24)	84 (29)	93 (34)	96 (36)	101 (38)	108 (42)	118 (48)	113 (45)	111 (44)	98 (37)	86 (30)	75 (24)	118 (48)
Mean maximum °F (°C)	64.2 (17.9)	69.9 (21.1)	78.2 (25.7)	84.2 (29.0)	89.5 (31.9)	93.9 (34.4)	99.1 (37.3)	99.0 (37.2)	93.9 (34.4)	86.3 (30.2)	74.2 (23.4)	65.3 (18.5)	100.7 (38.2)
Mean daily maximum °F (°C)	39.9 (4.4)	45.5 (7.5)	56.0 (13.3)	65.9 (18.8)	75.2 (24.0)	84.4 (29.1)	89.3 (31.8)	88.2 (31.2)	80.3 (26.8)	68.7 (20.4)	54.8 (12.7)	43.4 (6.3)	66.0 (18.9)
Daily mean °F (°C)	29.0 (−1.7)	33.8 (1.0)	43.7 (6.5)	53.7 (12.1)	64.3 (17.9)	73.8 (23.2)	78.4 (25.8)	76.6 (24.8)	68.2 (20.1)	56.3 (13.5)	43.2 (6.2)	32.9 (0.5)	54.5 (12.5)
Mean daily minimum °F (°C)	18.2 (−7.7)	22.0 (−5.6)	31.5 (−0.3)	41.6 (5.3)	53.3 (11.8)	63.2 (17.3)	67.6 (19.8)	65.0 (18.3)	56.0 (13.3)	43.8 (6.6)	31.7 (−0.2)	22.4 (−5.3)	43.0 (6.1)
Mean minimum °F (°C)	−0.2 (−17.9)	5.9 (−14.5)	15.4 (−9.2)	27.8 (−2.3)	38.5 (3.6)	51.9 (11.1)	58.2 (14.6)	55.3 (12.9)	41.0 (5.0)	28.2 (−2.1)	17.6 (−8.0)	6.1 (−14.4)	−4.3 (−20.2)
Record low °F (°C)	−20 (−29)	−28 (−33)	−9 (−23)	11 (−12)	21 (−6)	40 (4)	47 (8)	42 (6)	27 (−3)	16 (−9)	1 (−17)	−22 (−30)	−28 (−33)
Average precipitation inches (mm)	1.22 (31)	1.57 (40)	2.29 (58)	3.79 (96)	5.82 (148)	5.55 (141)	3.75 (95)	4.63 (118)	4.05 (103)	3.08 (78)	2.39 (61)	1.71 (43)	39.85 (1,012)
Average snowfall inches (cm)	3.2 (8.1)	2.1 (5.3)	0.7 (1.8)	0.0 (0.0)	0.0 (0.0)	0.0 (0.0)	0.0 (0.0)	0.0 (0.0)	0.0 (0.0)	0.1 (0.25)	0.5 (1.3)	2.6 (6.6)	9.2 (23)
Average precipitation days (≥ 0.01 in)	6.5	6.4	8.1	10.2	12.6	10.3	8.8	9.3	8.2	8.7	6.5	6.2	101.8
Average snowy days (≥ 0.1 in)	2.8	1.7	0.6	0.0	0.0	0.0	0.0	0.0	0.0	0.1	0.5	1.9	7.6
Source: NOAA

== Demographics ==
Historical population
Census	Pop.	Note	%±
1870	2,941		—
1880	4,032		37.1%
1890	6,248		55.0%
1900	6,934		11.0%
1910	7,650		10.3%
1920	9,018		17.9%
1930	9,563		6.0%
1940	10,193		6.6%
1950	10,081		−1.1%
1960	10,673		5.9%
1970	11,036		3.4%
1980	11,016		−0.2%
1990	10,667		−3.2%
2000	11,921		11.8%
2010	12,649		6.1%
2020	12,625		−0.2%
2023 (est.)	12,686		0.5%
U.S. Decennial Census; 2010-2020

=== 2020 census ===
As of the 2020 census, Ottawa had a population of 12,625, with 5,095 households and 3,095 families.

The population density was 1,223.2 inhabitants per square mile (472.3/km^{2}). There were 5,558 housing units at an average density of 538.5 per square mile (207.9/km^{2}). Of all housing units, 8.3% were vacant; the homeowner vacancy rate was 2.7% and the rental vacancy rate was 6.0%.

The median age was 36.1 years. Of residents, 23.5% were under the age of 18, 11.6% were from 18 to 24, 25.4% were from 25 to 44, 23.0% were from 45 to 64, and 16.5% were 65 years of age or older. For every 100 females, there were 97.5 males, and for every 100 females age 18 and over, there were 97.1 males age 18 and over.

Of the households, 30.4% had children under the age of 18 living in them, 41.8% were married-couple households, 20.2% had a male householder with no spouse or partner present, and 29.5% had a female householder with no spouse or partner present. About 32.5% of all households were made up of individuals, and 14.2% had someone living alone who was 65 years of age or older. The average household size was 2.4 and the average family size was 3.0.

98.7% of residents lived in urban areas, while 1.3% lived in rural areas. Among residents, 84.7% were non-Hispanic White.

Racial composition as of the 2020 census
Race	Number	Percent
White	10,924	86.5%
Black or African American	252	2.0%
American Indian and Alaska Native	127	1.0%
Asian	53	0.4%
Native Hawaiian and Other Pacific Islander	6	0.0%
Some other race	283	2.2%
Two or more races	980	7.8%
Hispanic or Latino (of any race)	761	6.0%

=== 2016–2020 American Community Survey ===
The 2016–2020 5-year American Community Survey estimates show that the percent of residents age 25 and over with a bachelor's degree or higher was 14.8%.

The 2016–2020 5-year American Community Survey estimates show that the median household income was $47,233 (with a margin of error of +/- $4,697) and the median family income was $62,633 (+/- $8,998). Males had a median income of $40,405 (+/- $4,108) versus $28,600 (+/- $4,719) for females. The median income for those above 16 years old was $32,282 (+/- $2,999). Approximately, 9.5% of families and 14.9% of the population were below the poverty line, including 18.4% of those under the age of 18 and 18.8% of those ages 65 or over.

=== 2010 census ===
As of the census of 2010, there were 12,649 people, 4,998 households, and 3,127 families living in the city. The population density was 1,357.2 inhabitants per square mile (524.0/km^{2}). There were 5,518 housing units at an average density of 592.1 per square mile (228.6/km^{2}). The racial makeup of the city was 91.0% White, 2.2% African American, 0.9% Native American, 0.4% Asian, 1.6% from other races, and 3.9% from two or more races. Hispanic or Latino of any race were 5.0% of the population.

There were 4,998 households, of which 34.4% had children under the age of 18 living with them, 44.6% were married couples living together, 12.8% had a female householder with no husband present, 5.1% had a male householder with no wife present, and 37.4% were non-families. 31.5% of all households were made up of individuals, and 13.5% had someone living alone who was 65 years of age or older. The average household size was 2.45 and the average family size was 3.08.

The median age in the city was 33.2 years. 27% of residents were under the age of 18; 11.5% were between the ages of 18 and 24; 25.5% were from 25 to 44; 22.9% were from 45 to 64; and 13.2% were 65 years of age or older. The gender makeup of the city was 48.5% male and 51.5% female.

== Economy ==
Ottawa's two major employers are Walmart and American Eagle Outfitters, who both maintain distribution centers in the city. Ottawa has freight rail service from BNSF railway. There is also a grain elevator operated by the Ottawa Co-Op. The city operates the Ottawa Municipal Airport, a small General Aviation airport four miles south of the city.

== Government ==
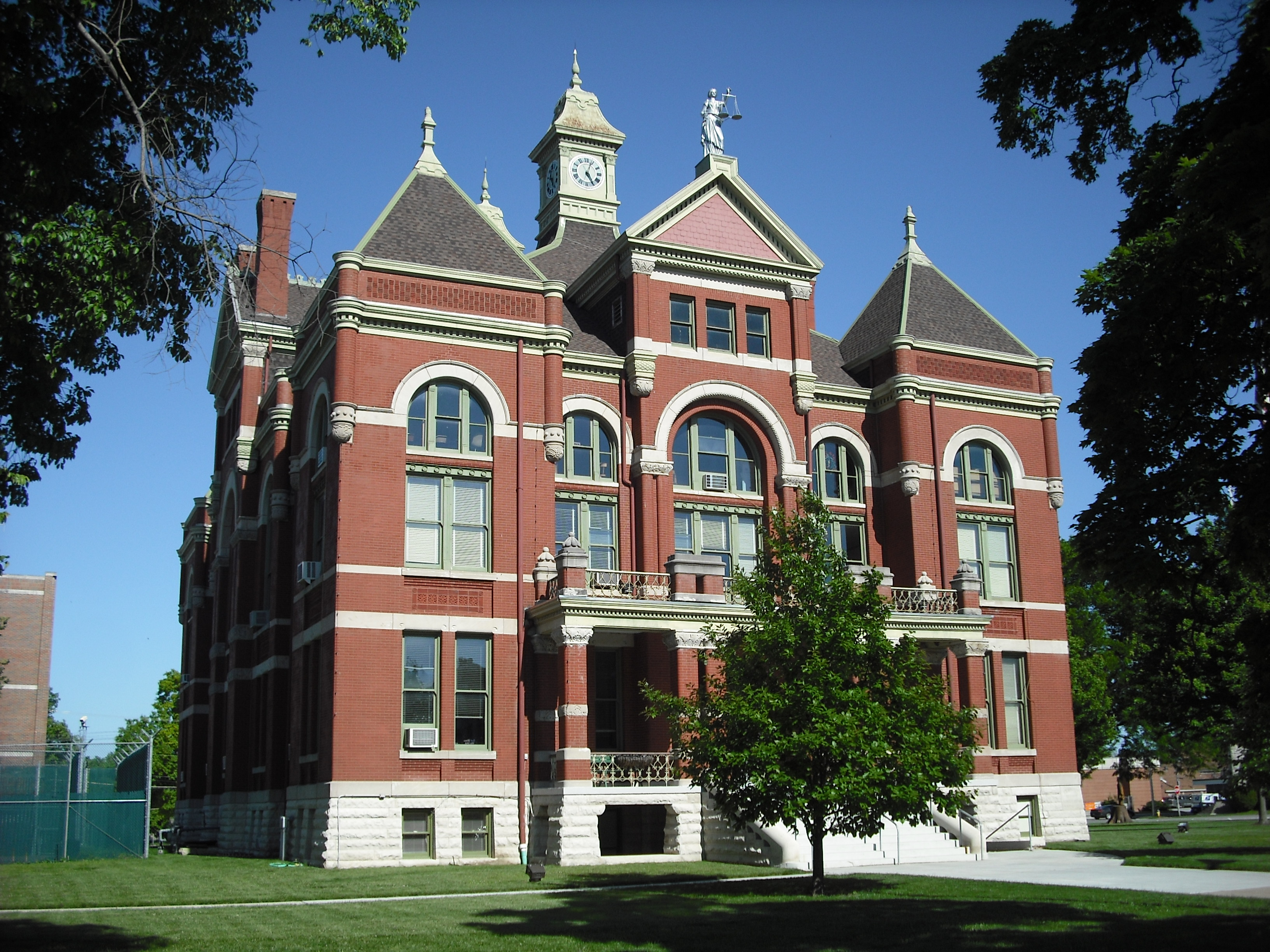
Franklin County Courthouse (2009)

Ottawa was governed by a Mayor-Council system until 1913 when the City became a Commission form of government. In 1970 voters established the City Manager form of government with a five-member Commission that annually selects a Mayor from its ranks. The citizens of Ottawa elect commissioners at-large. Three seats on the Commission are open every odd numbered year. Two Commissioners are elected to four-year terms and one is elected to a two-year term.

== Education ==
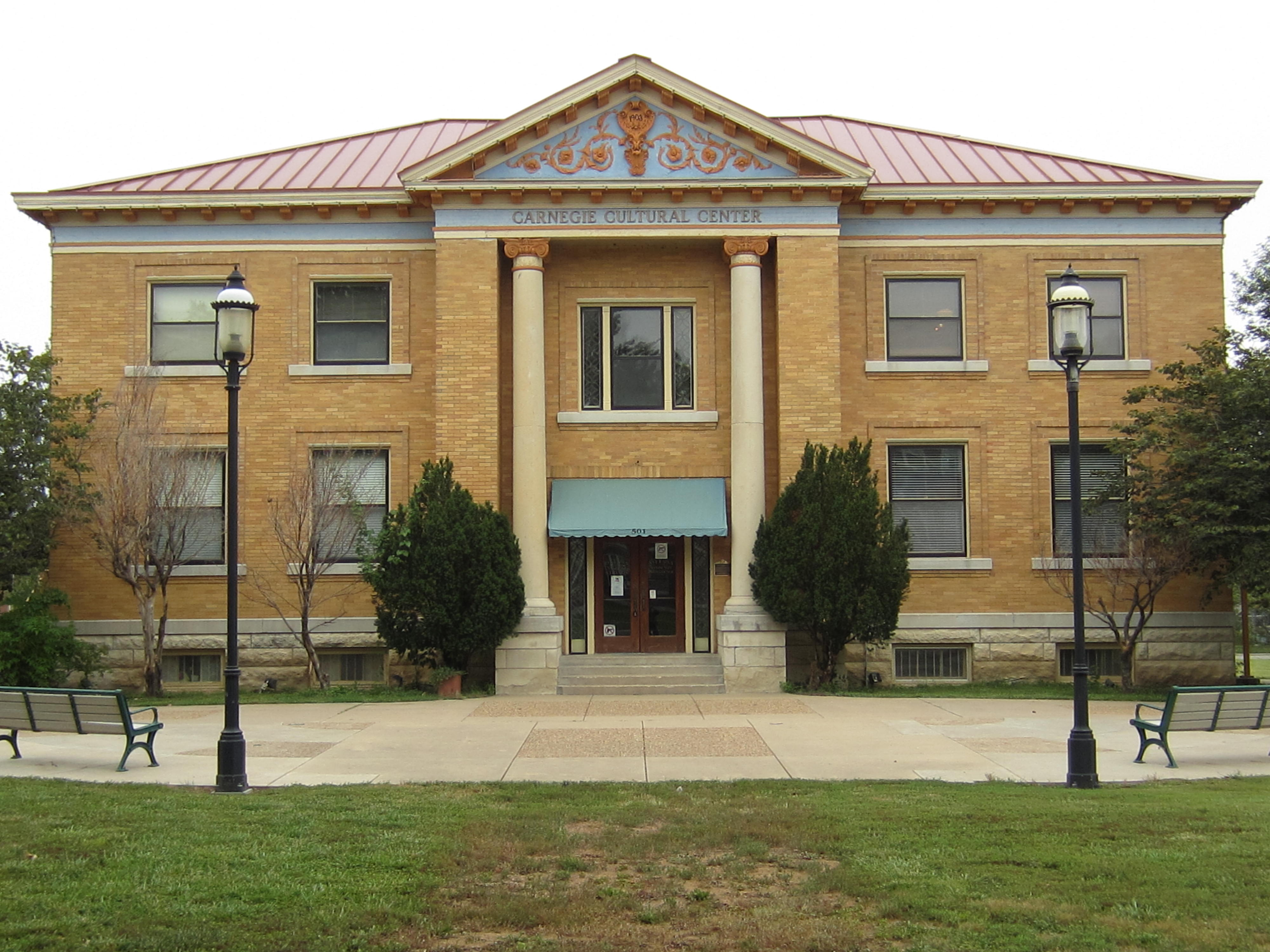
Former Ottawa Carnegie Library, now Carnegie Cultural Center (2013)

=== Colleges and universities ===
The private four year university, Ottawa University, is within Ottawa, and Ottawa is also home to a branch campus of Neosho County Community College.

=== Primary and secondary ===
The community is served by Ottawa USD 290 public school district, which has five schools:

- Ottawa High School
- Ottawa Middle School
- Garfield Elementary School
- Lincoln Elementary School
- Sunflower Elementary school

Ottawa has several private schools.

- Sacred Heart Catholic Elementary School
- Pilgrim Bible Academy
- Ottawa Christian Academy

== Media ==
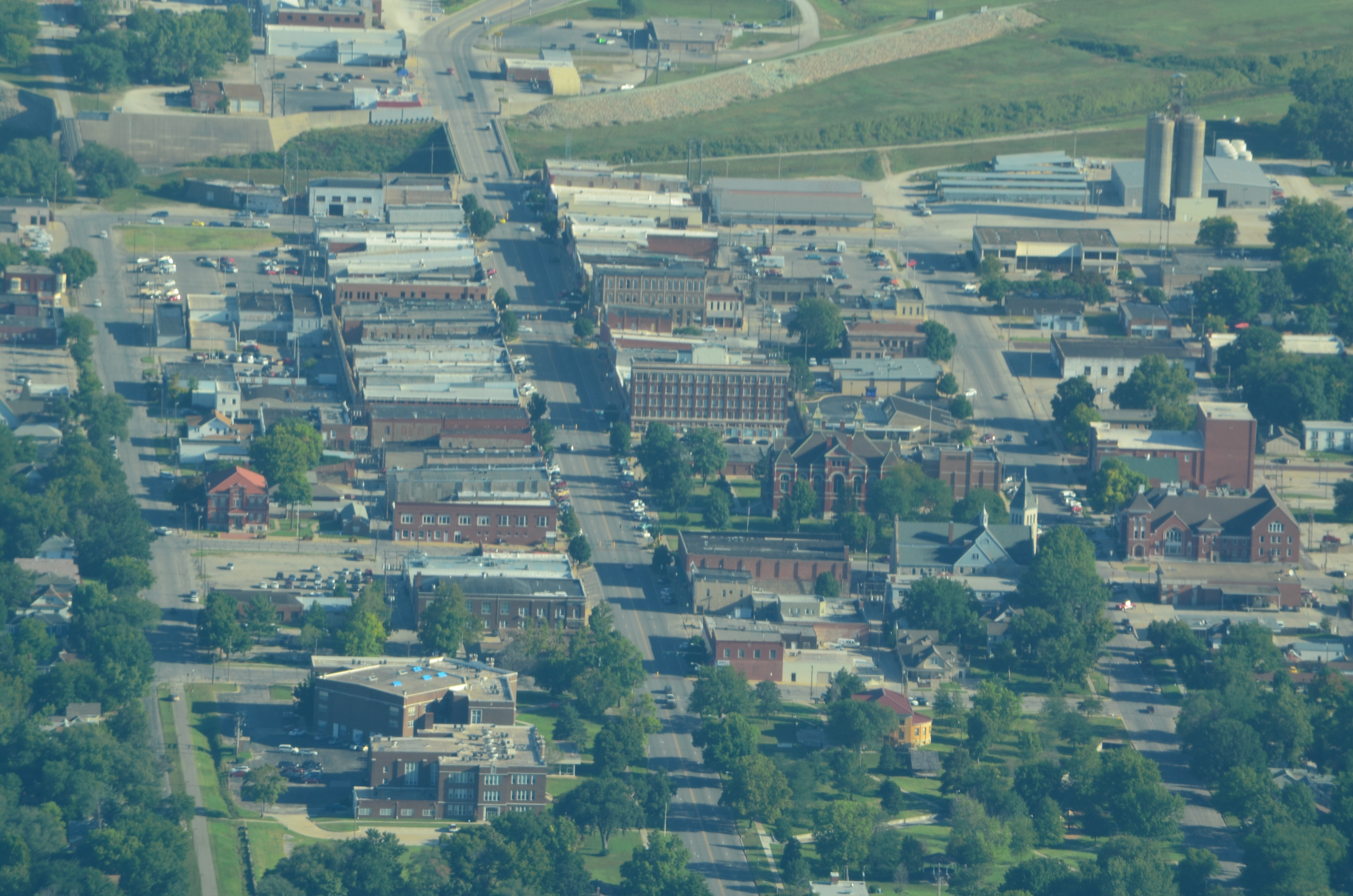
Aerial view of Ottawa (2013)

=== Newspapers ===
There is one publication which serves the city of Ottawa, the Ottawa Herald, which was founded in 1869.

=== Radio ===
Ottawa has four radio stations, one AM and three FM. KOFO broadcasts on 1220 with the tagline Your News source for East-Central Kansas. KOFO airs country music from across the decades, and specializes in local news. KCHZ 95.7 FM is licensed to Ottawa (and was, at one time, owned by KOFO); its studios are in Mission, Kansas.

== Entertainment ==
Downtown Ottawa is home to the Plaza Grill and Cinema (formerly the Crystal Plaza and Bijou Theater) which, in 2013, was discovered to be the oldest operating cinema in America. Plans for an exhibit are in the works.

== Health care ==
AdventHealth Ottawa is the only hospital.

== Notable people ==
- Steve Grogan, former New England Patriots quarterback, led Ottawa to a runner-up place in state football and to a state championship in basketball.
- Don Harrison, news anchor, one of the original anchors of CNN Headline News
- Gary Hart, former Democratic U. S. Senator from Colorado and Presidential Candidate in 1984 and 1988
- Steven Hawley, American astronaut (considers Salina as his hometown)
- Isaac Smith Kalloch, signatory of Ottawa's original town company charter, later became Mayor of San Francisco
- Semi Ojeleye, forward for the Milwaukee Bucks selected 37th overall in the 2nd round of the 2017 NBA draft, led Ottawa to a state championship in basketball.
- Stanley Sheldon, bassist and vocalist for Peter Frampton, most notably on Frampton's Frampton Comes Alive! album.
- John G. Thompson, a prominent mathematician.
- Jerry Voorhis, U. S. Representative for California's 12th congressional district from 1937–1947

== See also ==
- Ottawa Municipal Airport
- Great Flood of 1951
- Old Depot Museum
- Extreme Makeover: Home Edition (season 9)
- Franklin Savings Association
