= Oregon School for the Deaf =

Public school in Salem, Oregon, U.S.

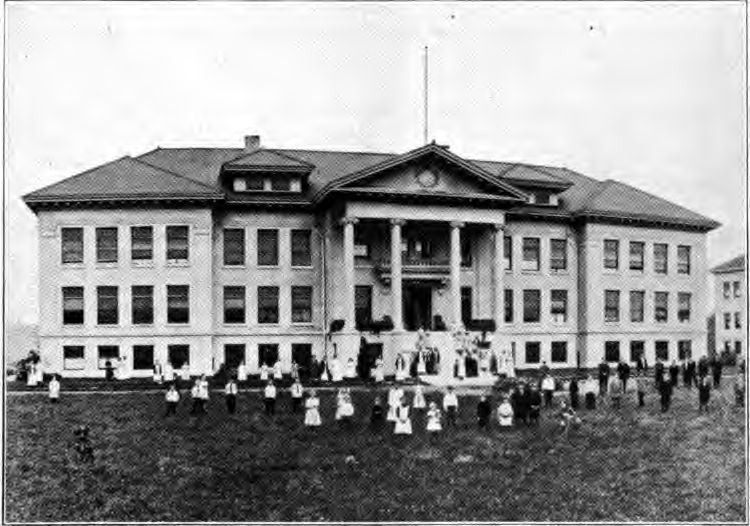
- Main building and school building, 1912

Location
- 999 Locust Street NE; Salem, (Marion County), Oregon 97301; United States; 44.965556°N 123.020556°W

Information
- Type: State (Public)
- Superintendent: Sharla Jones
- Principal: Matthew Boyd
- Enrollment: 120
- Colors: Purple and gold
- Athletics conference: OSAA Casco League 1A-2
- Mascot: Panther
- Accreditation: NAAS
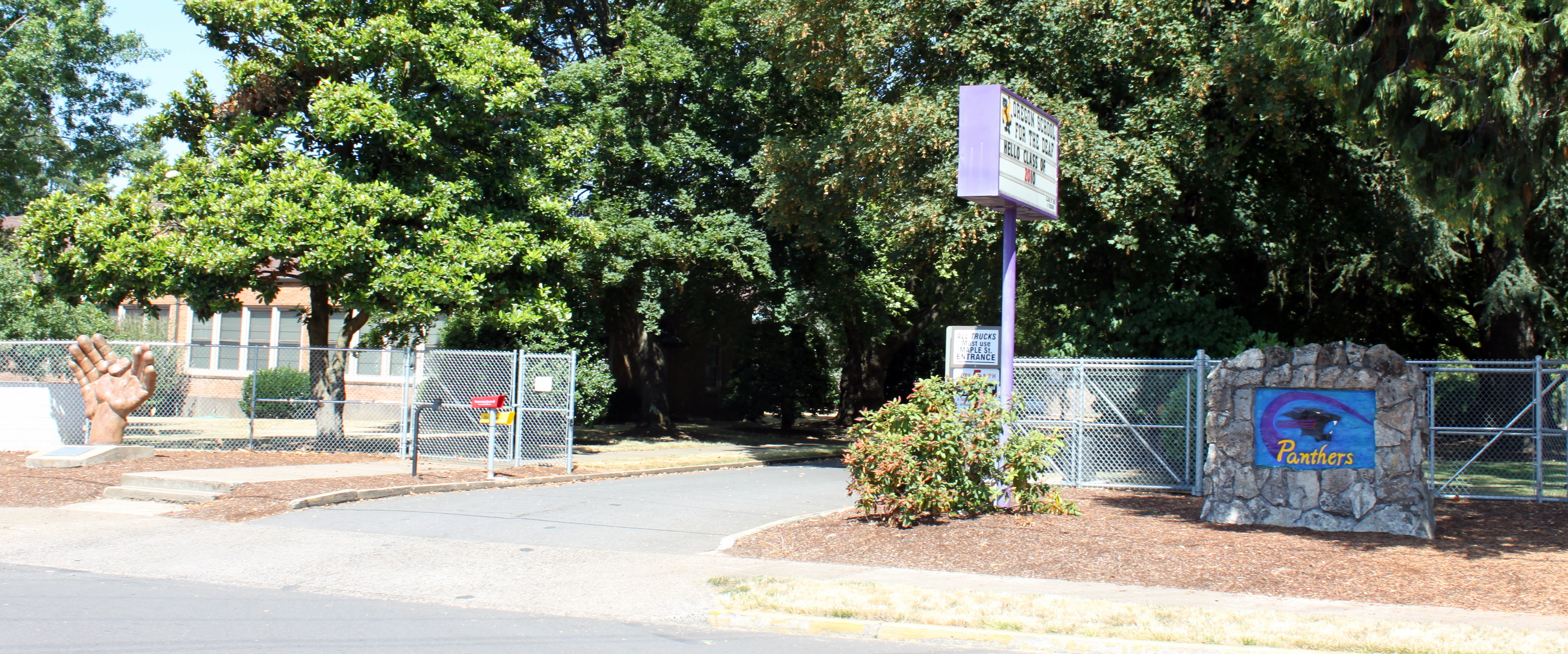
- Entrance to the school

Oregon School for the Deaf (OSD) is a state-funded school in Salem, Oregon, United States. It serves deaf and hard of hearing students from kindergarten through high school, and up to 18 years of age.

== History ==
Established in November 1870 by the Oregon Legislative Assembly as the Oregon Institute for the Deaf and Dumb to provide free public education to deaf children, it is one of the oldest continuously operating schools in Oregon. OSD was the first school for deaf children in Oregon. OSD also served children from Washington until 1886, when the Washington School for the Deaf was founded.

OSD was founded by William S. Smith, a deaf teacher, in Salem, Oregon. OSD rented buildings for its operations until 1879, when it bought property at Church and Mission streets. In 1880, the school's name was changed to the Oregon School for Deaf-Mutes. In 1895, the school moved to a site southeast of Salem on state-owned property near Turner Road. The school moved to its current location on Locust Street in 1910. The Turner Road building is still standing and was repurposed first as the Oregon State Tuberculosis Hospital, and later as part of Corban College.

The terms "deaf and dumb" and "deaf-mute" became outdated and were considered derogatory. In 1913, the name was changed to Oregon State School for the Deaf. In 1989, the name became Oregon School for the Deaf.

In 1988, G. I. Wilson became the school's director.

=== Nightmare Factory ===
In 1987, the Nightmare Factory haunted house attraction was founded as a way to raise money for the school.

=== Extreme Makeover: Home Edition ===
In Episode 172 of Extreme Makeover: Home Edition, a special Halloween episode, Ty and the other cast members helped renovate the school's Nightmare Factory. Instead of Ty shouting with his bullhorn to surprise the school, he sent a small plane with a visual message while the staff and students were having their annual barbecue. While the students were in Minnesota getting new hearing aids, the team built a new dormitory for the boys as their old dorms, along with the Nightmare Factory building, were considered unsafe to occupy. Guest stars included actress Marlee Matlin and Rob Zombie.

== Academics ==
The school is operated by the Oregon Department of Education, and has been accredited by Northwest Association of Accredited Schools since 2004 and also by the Conference of Educational Administrators of Schools and Programs for the Deaf.

ESP is a program to teach living skills to students who have modified diplomas or certificates. OSD offers honors, AP, and career courses. It serves students who are deaf or hard of hearing in their Community-Based Instruction program.

As of the 2004–05 academic year, the total full-time enrollment of the school, exclusive of cooperative programs with local school districts, was between 125 and 135.

In 2005, by order of the state legislature included in its annual appropriation for the school, study was begun on the potential benefit of moving the Oregon School for the Blind to the OSD campus. Oregon Superintendent of Public Instruction Susan Castillo rejected a proposal for services now provided by the school to be provided instead through contracts with other public or private institutions.

== Facilities ==
The school has a dormitory facility.

=== Buildings named in honor of staff and alumni ===
- Clatterbuck Services Facility, in honor of Superintendent Dr. Marvin B. Clatterbuck
- Hokanson Gym, in honor of Conrad Hokanson, long-time basketball coach
- Kuenzi Hall, in honor of Lewis Kuenzi, alumni and long-time staff
- Lindstrom Hall, in honor of Thomas Lindstrom, long-time teacher, two-time acting superintendent
- B.J. Peck Multipurpose Building, in honor of William "Bill" Peck, long-time teacher and director of school
- Peterson Hall, in honor of Ruth Peterson, long-time girls' supervisor
- Tillinghast Cottage, in honor of Superintendent Edward Tillinghast
- Ulmer Hall, in honor of Thomas Ulmer, long-time teacher
- Wallace Hall, in honor of Ruth Wallace, long-time supervisor of the pre-school dormitory
- Smith Building / Wynkoop Library, in honor of William Stephen Smith and Cora (Wynkoop) Smith, the school's founder and his wife

== See also ==
- Deaf culture
