= Extreme Makeover: Home Edition season 8 =

Extreme Makeover: Home Edition
- Season 8

Release
- Original network: ABC
- Original release: September 26, 2010 – May 15, 2011

Season chronology
- ← Previous; Season 7 Next → Season 9

This is a list of episodes of the eighth season of Extreme Makeover: Home Edition.

== Episodes ==
No.	Title	Location	Original release date	Prod. code
167	"Boys Hope/Girls Hope"	Baltimore, Maryland	September 26, 2010	802
In this two-hour premiere, Ty and the gang build a home for Girls Hope after Boys Hope nominated them to pass their success and achievements to them. The girls are surprised by the design team while they were being interviewed by the local news in a park. Guest stars include Raven-Symoné (first hour) and the cast of Modern Family (second hour). (Note: This episode is 2 hours long)
168	"The Lutz Family"	Long Island, New York	October 3, 2010	801
Ty and the gang surprise The Lutz Family at Yankee Stadium and their audition tape is shown there. Kathleen is one of 8 children whose late parents John and Grace, adopted children that mostly have Down syndrome. Their old home is over 40 years old and Ty and the gang, along with Sal Ferro of Alure Home Improvement help to repair their home while the family is on vacation. Guest stars include Kristin Chenoweth and The New York Yankees.
169	"The Johnson Family"	Houston, Texas	October 10, 2010	803
Ty and the gang build a home for Eric and Elaine, who are marriage counsellors, and their five daughters who want to become fashion models. The design team surprises them while they're watching a comedy show. Guest stars include comedians Paul Rodriguez, Tommy Davidson, and Ralphie May, supermodel Brooklyn Decker, and Cedric the Entertainer.
170	"The Arboleda Family"	Neenah, Wisconsin	October 17, 2010	805
Ty and the gang build a home for Rhex and Claire, who were originally from the Philippines, and their five children. Rhex wants to achieve the American dream by preventing childhood obesity through his initiative called Move to the Groove, which involves dancing. The design team surprises the family with a flash mob while they're at the farmers market. Their old home is too small to accommodate the five children, who are crammed into one small bedroom, and the house only has one bathroom. Guest stars include the cast of Dancing with the Stars.
171	"The Urban Family"	Hamburg, Pennsylvania	October 24, 2010	804
Ty and the gang, along with new designer Leigh Anne Tuohy help build a home for Trisha and her one-year-old daughter Cora. Trisha's husband Andy died of a heart attack shortly before Cora was born. Since Andy's death, Trisha has been spreading awareness to the American Heart Association and Cora's Hope. The design team surprises the family while at a carnival. Their old home is centuries old and the team managed to save some items to add to their new home. In addition to the new home, the design team also built some homes for their farm animals. Guest stars include supermodel Christie Brinkley.
172	"Oregon School for the Deaf"	Salem, Oregon	October 31, 2010	807
In this special Halloween episode, Ty and the gang help renovate the school's Nightmare Factory, which is a haunted house whose proceeds are used to keep the school afloat. Instead of Ty shouting with his bullhorn to surprise the school, he sends a small plane with a visual message while the staff and students are having their annual barbecue. While the students are in Minnesota getting new hearing aids, the team builds a new dormitory for the boys as their old dorms along with the Nightmare Factory was considered unsafe to live in. Guest stars include actress Marlee Matlin and Rob Zombie. (Note: These Episodes about the Holidays)
173	"Marshall-Spreier Family"	Pocatello, Idaho	November 7, 2010	806
Ty and the gang build a home for Jane Marshall-Spreier, a breast cancer survivor, and her eight children. Their lives were saved by their dog, Betsy, who woke them up when their old house caught fire. Guest stars include singer fellow breast cancer survivor Kylie Minogue, who will perform a concert at the reveal and canines that will help out in the demo.
174	"Lighthouse School/Sweatt Family"	Nashville, Tennessee	November 14, 2010	808
Ty's team rebuilds a school that was devastated by the 500-year flood that hit Tennessee on May 1, 2010. LeAnn Rimes, Keith Urban and Carrie Underwood pitch in, and Leigh Anne Tuohy joins the design team.
175	"The Anderson Family"	Maple Heights, Ohio	December 5, 2010	809
Ty and the gang build a 'Smart' home for Andre and Jasmine Anderson, who are visually impaired, their 2 children, one of whom is hearing impaired, and their guide dog Valentine. The design team surprises them while they board a public bus. Guest stars include singer John Legend, the Cleveland Browns, and the Cleveland Cavaliers.
176	"The Gaston Family"	Pensacola, Florida	December 12, 2010	811
In this special Christmas episode, Ty and the gang surprise Finis Gaston in the school cafeteria. Finis takes in his sister's children after a terrible accident. He puts his college studies on hold to work and give back to the community by volunteering for the cheerleading squad. The rented house that they are living in has a crumbling foundation, so the team are unable to tear it down. Instead, they build their new home on new land, courtesy of a donation from Escambia County. In addition to the new home, the family gets a maintenance fund of over $50,000 and a scholarship. Guest stars include singer Mariah Carey and Olympic gymnast Dominique Dawes.
177	"The Grommesh Family"	Moorhead, Minnesota	January 2, 2011	810
Ty and the gang help build an accessible home for 10-year-old Garrett Grommesh, who has spina bifida and his family. The team surprises them at their local hockey rink. The family created Hope Inc., a health and recreation program for people who have mobility challenges like Garrett. Their old home is inaccessible for Garrett and he decides to pay it forward by giving their old home to his friend and classmate Arlinda Hajdari and her family, who moved to the United States from Kosovo. In addition to the new accessible home, their program has set a Guinness World Record by creating a larger image of their logo in an open field.
178	"The Lampe Family"	Louisville, Kentucky	January 9, 2011	812
Ty and the gang help build a home for Jeff Lampe and his family. The team surprises them while at the movie theatre. Jeff had to cut back with his tree business due an untreated hernia and the family is unable to repair their water damaged home. Despite their situation, the family teaches teens wrestling by using their garage as a training facility. Also, in celebration of the Lampe family's love for the outdoors, a multi-platform, bridged tree house, courtesy of treetop builders, was constructed in the family's backyard. Guest stars include UFC fighter Randy Couture, coaching and wrestling legend Dan Gable, and Olympic Gold medalist Kurt Angle.
179	"The Simpson Family"	Savannah, Georgia	January 16, 2011	813
Ty and the gang help build a home for Jim and Carmen Simpson, which is in need of repair. Zoe, the youngest child was born with a deadly condition and he wasn't expected to survive. He was called a 'miracle baby' because his eyes were healed and he was able to breathe on his own. The team, along with Paula Deen surprise the family (who are dining with area volunteers) at her restaurant. The family are avid volunteers and they created a wish list of things they would like to help out with their community. While the family was on vacation, the team managed to fulfill some of the things that were in the list. In addition to the new home, the family received a new Ford Explorer. Guest stars in this episode include Paula Deen, snowboarder Olympic gold medalist Shaun White and his brother Jesse.
180	"The Graham Family"	Augusta, Georgia	January 23, 2011	815
Ty and the gang rebuild a home for Earnie Graham and her two children. Earnie gives back to the community by volunteering with the Girl Scouts of the USA. The team surprises the family at the Girl Scouts office. In addition to the new home and a brand new Ford Explorer, the team also rebuild a new cabin at Camp Tanglewood named after Earnie, since their old cabin was burned down.
181	"The Brown Family"	Terry County, Texas	January 30, 2011	814
In this special two hour episode, Ty and the gang build a home for Jeanne, Johnny Mac, and their 12-year-old daughter Katrina. The family's oldest daughter Alex died in a car accident due to texting and driving, and the family are now making it their mission to prevent others from suffering the same fate. The team, along with Alex's best friend Amanda, surprise the family by showing a placard message (the students revealed the message from the bleachers). In addition to the new home, a fund was created in honor of Alex (RAB) by signing the pledge not to text and drive and later receive thumb bands. Guest stars include Justin Bieber, (Note: Bieber was in New York City when the family are vacationing part of his concert My World Tour at Izod Center in East Rutherford, New Jersey, Paige accompanied Katrina's friends to be with the family) Emma Roberts and NASCAR racers, Carl Edwards and Greg Biffle.
182	"The Hurston Family"	Cocoa, Florida	February 13, 2011	817
Ty and the gang rebuild a home for Joe and Cindy Hurston and their 3 children. The family visits different countries by bringing medical supplies to help those affected in disasters; most recently, the 2010 Haiti earthquake. Their old home has suffered water damage while they tend to others. The team surprises the family after landing from an old plane the team was riding on. In addition to the new home, the family witnesses some children in Haiti receive clean drinking water as a result of the team sending water and new purifiers via plane.
183	"The Zeigler Family"	Fort Hood, Texas	February 20, 2011	816
Ty and the gang build a home for Staff Sergeant Patrick Zeigler and his fiancee Jessica. Patrick was wounded during the 2009 shootings at Foot Hood, in which 13 people were killed and 32 were injured in the incident. Jessica stayed by his side during Patrick's recovery and were living in a temporary home. In addition to the new home, the team will host their wedding. Guest stars include Duff Goldman from Ace of Cakes, comedian Dane Cook, and America's Got Talent winner Terry Fator.
184	"The Hall Family"	Wichita, Kansas	April 17, 2011	822
Carl and Stacy Hall were high school sweethearts with 4 children (3 daughters and 1 son). Carl attended Wichita State University and played baseball until his graduation. On June 26th, Carl and his oldest daughter, Megan, 16, were driving to a sporting event and the car lost control and landed on the passenger side first, where Carl was sitting. When he got to the hospital, Carl was left paralyzed from the neck down. The family were receiving some many medical bills that they had to sell their home and move into a temporary house that was not suitable for Carl's wheelchair. So Ty surprises that family at Wichita State and received a donated land for the Hall's new home. Note: Carl Hall died on March 23, 2024.
185	"The Hill Family"	Virginia Beach, Virginia	April 24, 2011	820
The team helps rebuild the home of a woman who has dedicated herself to her community and her six adopted daughters. Note: Instead of surprising the family at their home, Ty and the gang surprise them at their church.
186	"The Dickinson Family"	Beaufort, South Carolina	May 1, 2011	818
The team assists the family of a Marine whose home's condition is continually depreciating due to spreading mold and flood damage.
187	"The Prewitt Brewer Family"	Middleburg, Florida	May 8, 2011	819
Carrie Prewitt, a volleyball coach, has been a legal guardian for 3 sisters for two years, Ashley, 18, Taylor, 14, and Gina, 12. Ashley, Taylor and Gina lost their parents by drugs, and they didn't want to get separated, and since Ashley was one of the volleyball players for Carrie, she took them into her old little home. Do for this special Mother's Day episode, Ty actually gets some big surprises. He brings Micheal and Jillian's mom's, Misty May-Treanor gets to help, and build a beach volleyball field while the family goes to the Virgin Islands.
188	"The Sharrock Family"	Rossville, Georgia	May 15, 2011	821
Patrick Sharrock, a 9-year-old boy, has been born with a brittle bone disease. He has broken at least fifty-nine bones in his body. His parents, Micheal and Cindy, are very concerned that something bad might happen to Patrick. Their house wasn't very secure in light Patrick's disorder, so Ty and the rest of the team help the Sharrocks by sending them to Walt Disney World Resort and building for them a home that will allow Patrick more freedom of movement than their old house. Special guest: Atticus Shaffer Note: Since Patrick is a super hero and comic book fan, Ty, Ed, Eduardo, Xzbit and Leigh Anne destroyed their old home by using their "super powers." They were called "Legion of Demo." Ed's super name: English Muffin; Power: Change Color* (with paint). Eduardo's super name: H2-Xol; Power: Commander of water. Xzbit's super name: X-plosive; Power: Explodes things with his mind. Leigh Anne's super name: Forti-Touhy; Power: Strength of a hundred bears. Ty's super name: Super Ty; Power: Loud noise (With Loud Speaker) Note: Patrick Sharrock died on September 15, 2017 at the age of 15. Final appearance of Eduardo Xol and Leigh Anne Tuohy

== See also ==
- List of Extreme Makeover: Home Edition episodes
- Extreme Makeover: Home Edition Specials
