= AdventHealth Ottawa =

- AdventHealth
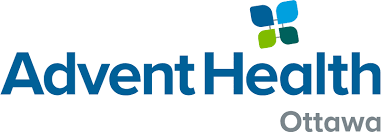

Geography
- Location: 1301 South Main Street, Ottawa, Kansas, United States
- Coordinates: 38°35′47″N 95°16′04″W

Organization
- Care system: Private hospital
- Type: Acute-care hospital
- Religious affiliation: Seventh-day Adventist Church

Services
- Standards: Joint Commission
- Emergency department: Level IV trauma center
- Beds: 44

History
- Former name: Ransom Memorial Hospital
- Opened: 1931

Links
- Website: www.adventhealth.com/hospital/adventhealth-ottawa
- Lists: Hospitals in the United States

AdventHealth Ransom Memorial, Inc. (doing business as AdventHealth Ottawa) is a nonprofit hospital in Ottawa, Kansas, United States operated by AdventHealth. The medical facility is designated a Level IV trauma center.

== History ==
Ransom Memorial Hospital was founded in the spring of 1931, after money was donated by a married couple and it was matched by the community. The two-story hospital was operated by eleven employees. In 1954, money was raised and a new wing was added on the southeast side, it opened in 1956. In 1968, a third floor was added to the southeast wing. In 1974, a west wing was built. In 1990, the southern part of the original building and first addition wing were demolished. And construction began on a new hospital building, in December 1991 it opened. In 1992, what was left of the original building was demolished.

On May 1, 2019, Ransom Memorial Health was rebranded to AdventHealth Ottawa, after AdventHealth signed a lease with Franklin County to operate the hospital. On June 14, 2025, AdventHealth Ottawa expanded its partnership with NorthStar Anesthesia to help it reopen its obstetrics program.

== See also ==
- List of Seventh-day Adventist hospitals
- List of trauma centers in the United States
- AdventHealth Field
