= Oregon School for the Blind =

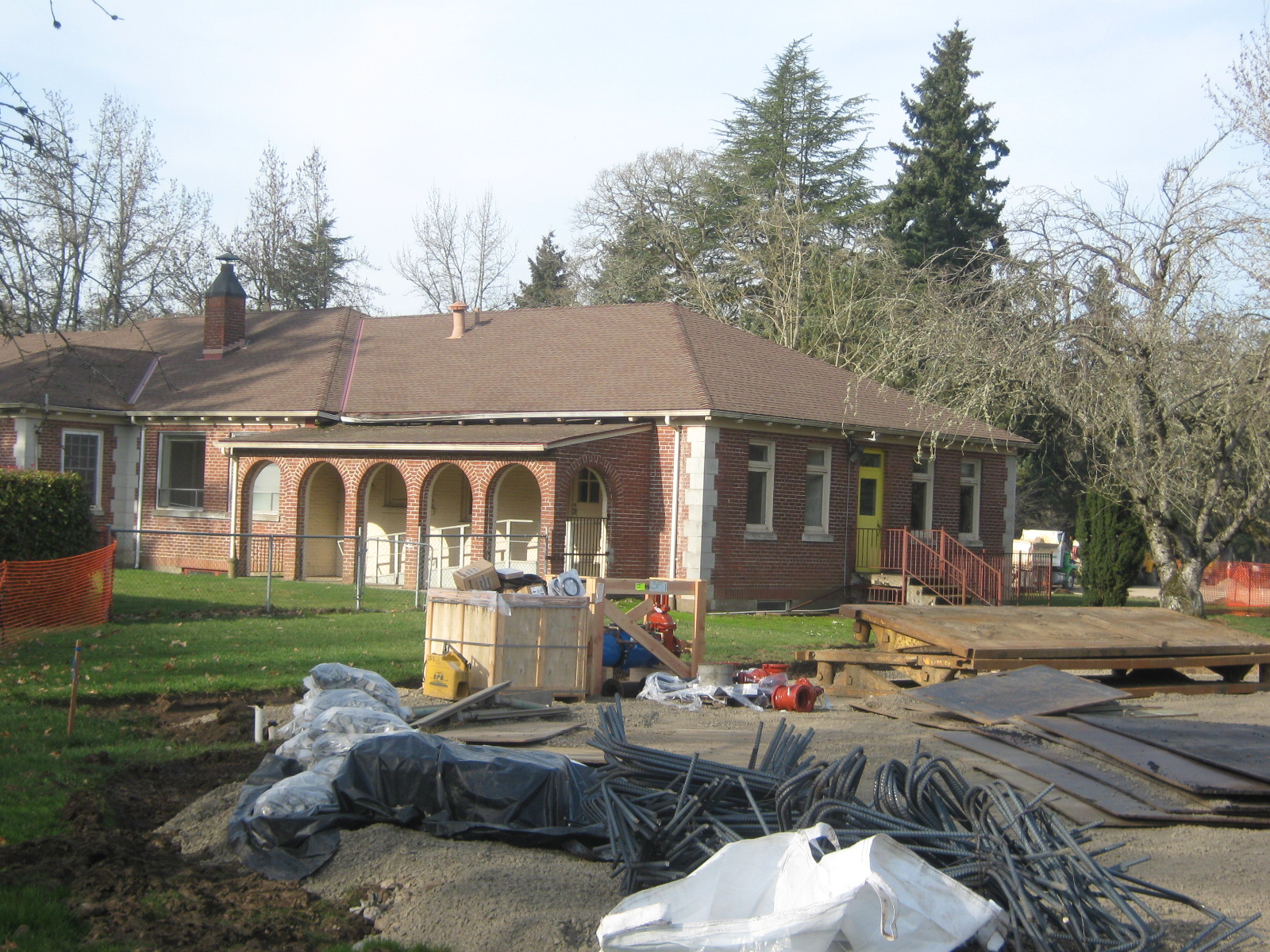
- Howard Hall, part of the Oregon School for the Blind, a week before demolition

Location
- 700 Church Street SE; Salem, Marion County, Oregon 97301; United States; 44.932342°N 123.037318°W

Information
- Type: public/blind
- Established: 1872
- Closed: 2009
- Grades: K-12
- Enrollment: 46

The Oregon School for the Blind (OSB), was a state-run public school in Salem, Oregon, United States, serving blind and vision impaired students of kindergarten through high school grades through residential, day school, and part-time enrollment programs. Opened in 1873, the school was operated by the Oregon Department of Education. The school's closure in 2009 had been the culmination of several years of contentious debate that continued after the closure when lawsuits were filed concerning the sale of the campus.

It was also known as the Oregon State School for the Blind (OSSB) and Oregon Institute for the Blind.

== History ==
Established in 1872 by the Oregon Legislative Assembly as the Institute for the Blind, the school was to provide free public education to blind children. The next year the school opened on February 26, and its first classes were held in a private home. In 1881, former Portland mayor Henry Failing donated land to build the school.

In late 1911, a new pipe organ was installed on the campus at a cost of $2,000. The school's organist instructor T. S. Roberts gave the dedicatory recital on November 28.

In 2005, by order of the state legislature, a study was begun on the potential benefit of moving the school to the Oregon School for the Deaf campus.

The 2009 Oregon legislature eliminated funding for the OSB, with plans to sell the property. OSB closed in July 2009 with the 8.33-acre (3.37 ha) site set to be put up for sale in May 2010. However, a group composed of opponents of the school closure and Failing's heirs are suing the State to prevent it from selling the property. Salem Hospital, Willamette University, and Western Oregon University all expressed interest in acquiring the land.

In March 2010, the legislature passed a law that allocated half the proceeds from the sale of the former school site to educating blind students in Oregon. The other half of the funds are to go towards improvements at the Oregon School for the Deaf's campus. The law settled the lawsuits filed against the state from the descendants of the land donors, and the campus was sold to Salem Hospital for $6 million in August 2010.

Salem Hospital demolished the last remaining historic school building, the John V. Bennes-designed Howard Hall, in 2015.

== Campus ==
Howard Hall served as the dormitory.

== See also ==
- Blindness and education
