= Ottawa High School (Kansas) =

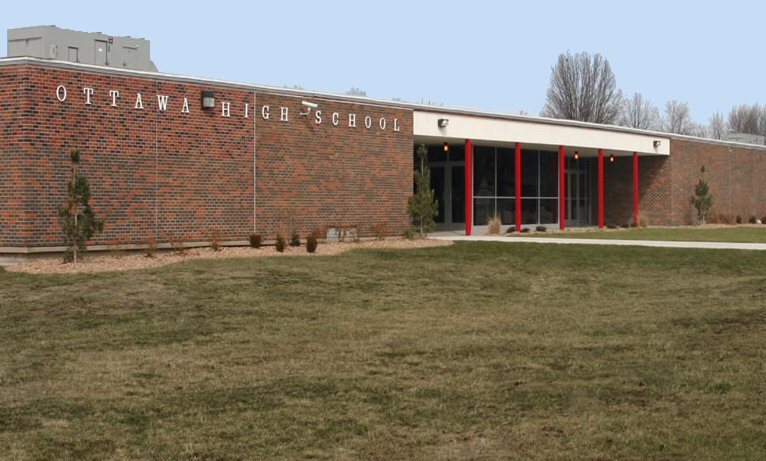
- Ottawa High School in 2010

Location
- 1120 South Ash Street; Ottawa, Kansas 66067; United States; 38°36′01″N 95°16′42″W

Information
- School type: Public, High School
- Established: 1917; 109 years ago
- School district: Ottawa USD 290
- Superintendent: Ryan Cobbs
- Principal: Kelly Whittaker
- Teaching staff: 55.33 (FTE)
- Grades: 9–12
- Gender: Co-educational
- Enrollment: 681 (2024–2025)
- Student to teacher ratio: 12.31
- Education system: block
- Classes offered: College & College Prep
- Colors: Red and White (Unofficially Black)
- Song: “Hail Alma Mater”
- Fight song: “We’re Out For Victory”
- Athletics: 16 Varsity Sports
- Athletics conference: Frontier League
- Sports: Yes
- Nickname: Cyclones
- Rival: Baldwin Bulldogs; Louisburg Wildcats; Paola Panthers
- Newspaper: The Review
- Yearbook: The Record
- Affiliation: KSHSAA 4A
- Athletics Director: Brad Graf
- Website: www.usd290.org/o/ohs

Ottawa High School is a public high school located in Ottawa, Kansas, operated by Ottawa USD 290 public school district, serving students in grades 9–12. Its athletic teams, known as the Cyclones, compete in the Frontier Athletic League. The principal is Kelly Whittaker, the assistant principal is Johnny Lewis, and the athletic director is Shawn Phillips. The current enrollment of the school is approximately 710 students, and the school has 102 teachers, secretaries, paras, and nurses. Ottawa Middle School is its main feeder school.

== History ==
The original Ottawa school district was established on November 12, 1864. The first term of Ottawa Public School (then the only school in the county) was held from 1864 to 1865 in the upstairs of a building on Second Street and Main Street. The first school building was built in 1866 and served until 1872.

A newer school, referred to as Central School, was built at Fifth Street and Main Street and served until 1898 when it was renamed Washington School until 1927.

In 1917, adjacent to Washington School, a new building designed by architect George Washburn's son officially became Ottawa High School. This new school served the community for 51 years before a new school on Ash Street replaced it in 1968. Later, in 1978, wood and metal shops were added. The latest addition was created in 1990.

== Academics ==
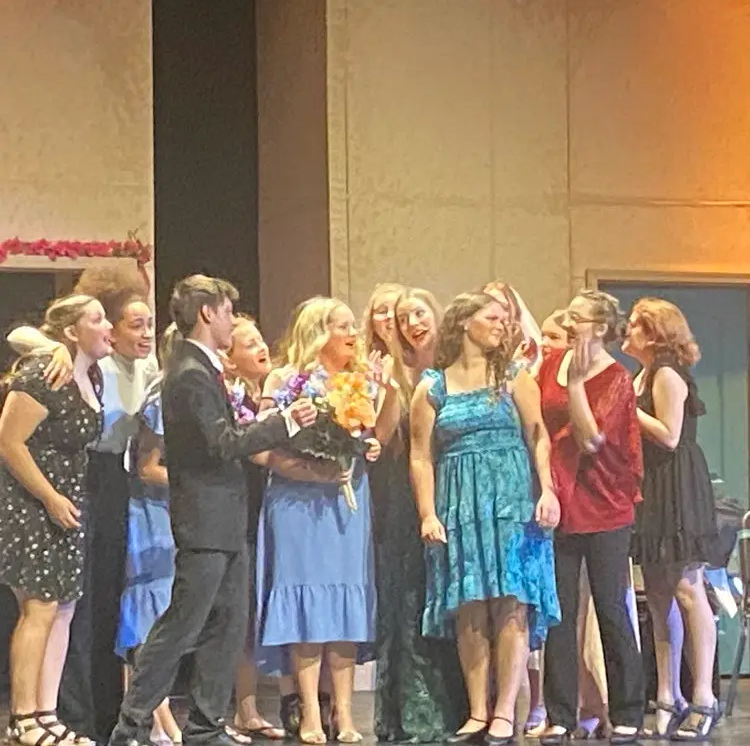
Ottawa High School’s 2024 musical theater performance of "Mamma Mia!"

In addition to the standard curriculum, the school has various courses geared towards the preparation of students for college or university-level education. College prep courses are offered in English, government and economics.

Ottawa High School offers college classes via Neosho County Community College, classes on the Spanish language, and visual and performing arts classes such as basic/advanced art, clay construction, debate, forensics, theatre, band, and various vocal classes.

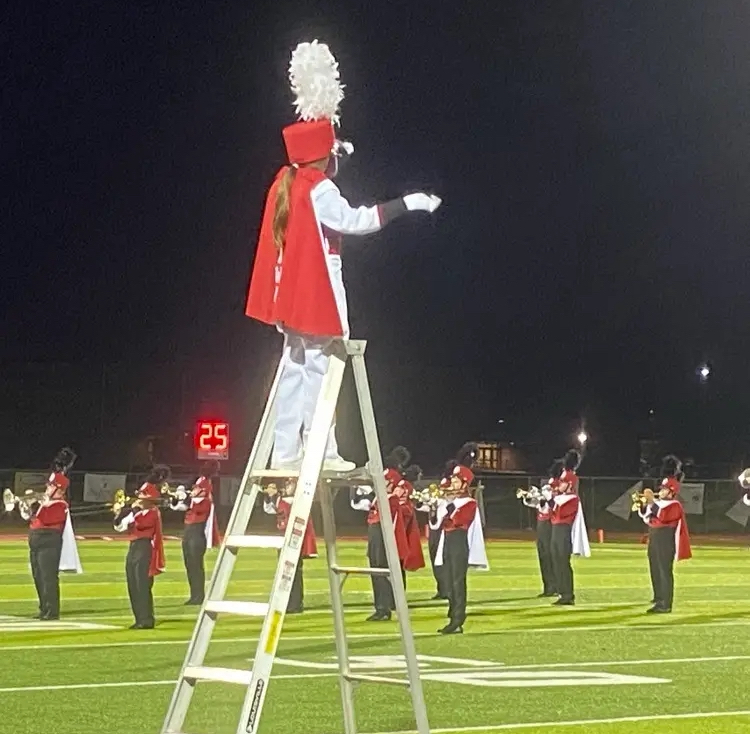
A drum major conducts the Marching Cyclone Band

Ottawa High also has a newspaper class that electronically publishes The Review, with physical copies released near the end of each semester, and a yearbook class that annually puts out The Record.

== Extracurricular activities ==
The Cyclones compete in the Frontier League and are classified as a 4A school according to the KSHSAA. Throughout its history, Ottawa High School has won several state championships in various sports and activities.

=== Athletics ===
Ottawa High School offers the following sports:

Fall

- Football
- Volleyball
- Boys' Cross-Country
- Girls' Cross-Country
- Boys' Soccer
- Girls' Tennis
- Cheerleading
- Dance Team (Cyclonettes)

Winter

- Boys' Basketball
- Girls' Basketball
- Wrestling
- Winter Cheerleading
- Dance Team (Cyclonettes)

Spring

- Baseball
- Boys' Golf
- Boys' Tennis
- Girls' Soccer
- Softball
- Boys' Track and Field
- Girls' Track and Field

=== State championships ===
State Championships
Season	Sport	Number of Championships	Year
Fall	Cross Country, Girls	7	1981, 1985, 1987, 1996, 1997, 1998, 1999
Fall	Cross Country, Boys	1	1972
Winter	Basketball, Boys	3	1928, 1971, 2013
Winter	Indoor Track & Field, Boys	1	1970
Spring	Track and Field, Boys	4	1948, 1970, 1971, 2000
Spring	Track and Field, Girls	3	1981, 1982, 1983
Spring	Softball	1	2003
Total		20	

=== Drama and theatre ===
==== Fall musical and spring play ====
Every year the Ottawa High School music department presents a fall musical. The performance is run by a student cast, stage crew, tech crew, and pit, and is put on at the school’s own performing arts center.

Ottawa High School puts on a play every spring at the performing arts center with a student cast and crew.

==== Debate and forensics ====
Many Ottawa students participate in speaking and acting competitions throughout the school year. During the fall, Ottawa's Debate team is active, and during the spring the Forensics teams is active. Both teams, composed of 9th–12th graders, compete on Saturdays at area high schools. Ottawa annually hosts both debate and forensics tournaments. When competing nationally, Ottawa competes in the National Catholic Forensic League.

== Notable alumni ==
- Steve Grogan, former New England Patriots quarterback, led Ottawa to a runner-up place in state football and to a state championship in basketball
- Don Harrison, news anchor, one of the original anchors of CNN Headline News
- Semi Ojeleye, forward for the Milwaukee Bucks, selected 37th overall in the 2nd round of the 2017 NBA draft. Ojeleye led Ottawa to a state championship and the school's all-time best record of 25–0 in 2013.
- Stanley Sheldon, bassist and vocalist for Peter Frampton, most notably on Frampton's Frampton Comes Alive! album
- John G. Thompson, mathematician, awarded the Fields Medal in 1970

== See also ==
- List of high schools in Kansas
- List of unified school districts in Kansas
