= Sparrow Clubs USA =

American children's charity

Sparrow Clubs USA is a Washington non-profit organization helps high schools to "adopt" children with diseases such as cancer and help raise funds to help cover medical expenses. It received national attention in an edition of ABC's popular series Extreme Makeover: Home Edition when they profiled The McPhail Family.

== History ==
In 1992, teacher Jeff Leeland and his wife Kristi found themselves in a desperate situation. His nine-month-old son Michael needed a bone marrow transplant, but insurance provided by his new job did not cover the $200,000 cost. At the time, Jeff was the teacher of an adaptive physical education class. Dameon, one of Jeff's students, heard about his teacher's dilemma, and made a gift of $60 to help. Dameon's $donation started a chain reaction of compassion by the kids and staff at Kamiakin Junior High. The community rallied behind these students and in four weeks raised $227,000. Michael received his lifesaving transplant. These students created a future model for students to become catalysts of the same spirit of compassion and contribution in their own communities by helping children in medical need, and in 1995, Sparrow Clubs was established.

== Media coverage ==
C.J. McPhail, along with his wife Lindsay, started a chapter of the Sparrow Clubs in Southern Oregon seven years after the original Club started. Their generosity and ongoing work earned them national attention in 2011 when they were selected to have their home rebuilt on the ABC television reality series Extreme Makeover: Home Edition. Their home was replaced with a new home. The entire construction process was chronicled on local ABC affiliate KDRV NewsWatch 12 and all other television outlets.
