= The Plaza Grill and Cinema =

Oldest movie theater in the world

Plaza 1907
- The Bijou; The Crystal Plaza; The Plaza
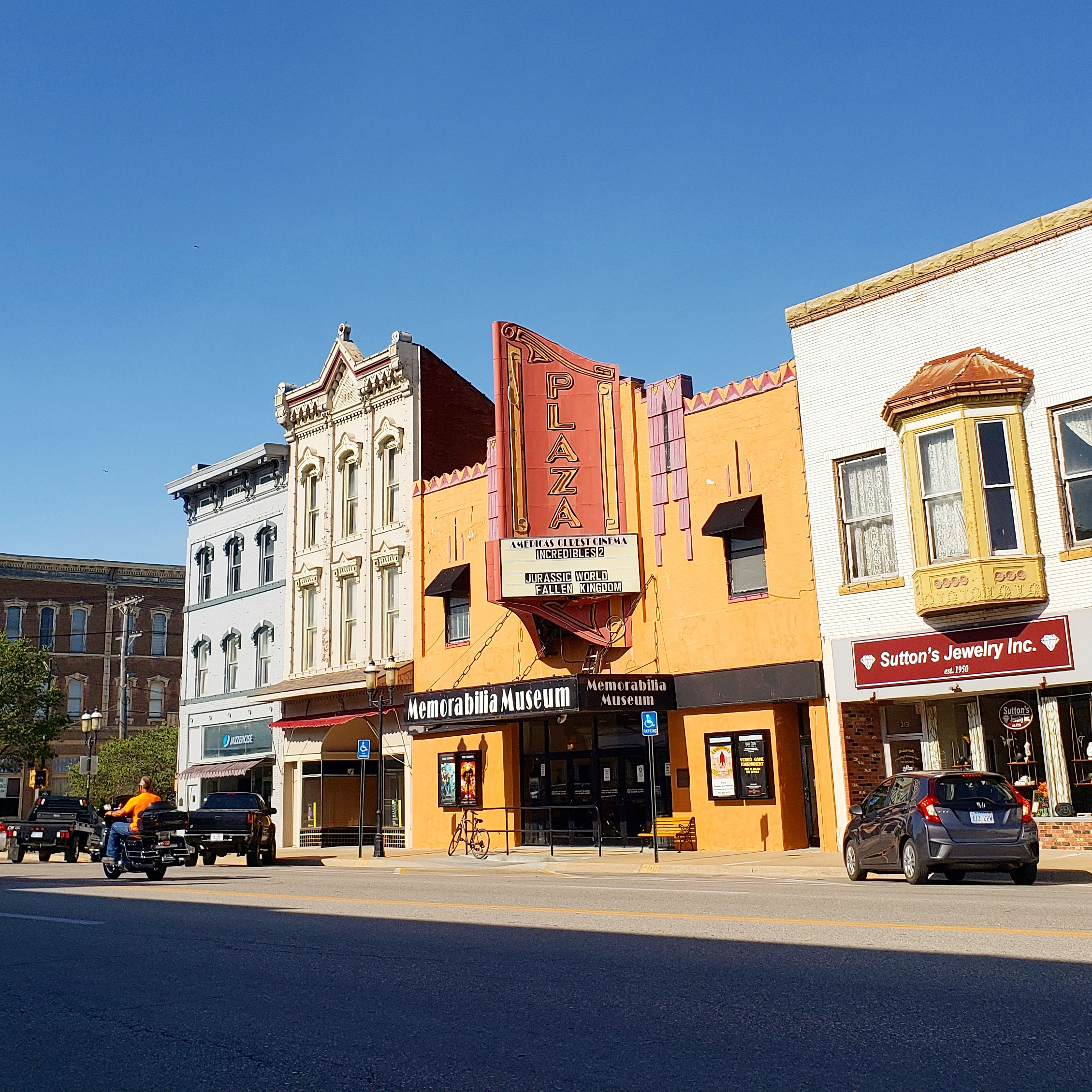
- Façade in 2018
- Interactive map of Plaza 1907
- Address: 209 S. Main; Ottawa, Kansas; United States
- Coordinates: 38°36′55.332″N 95°16′05.88″W
- Owner: Scott Zaremba
- Designation: World's oldest purpose-built cinema currently in operation
- Current use: Movie Theatre

Construction
- Opened: May 22, 1907 (119 years ago)

Website
- Plaza Grill and Cinema

Plaza 1907 (formerly known as The Plaza Grill and Cinema and Crystal Plaza and The Bijou) is located in Ottawa, Kansas, United States and has been named the "oldest purpose-built cinema in operation in the world", having applied to Guinness World Records in June 2017 and beaten out a theatre in Denmark by two days.

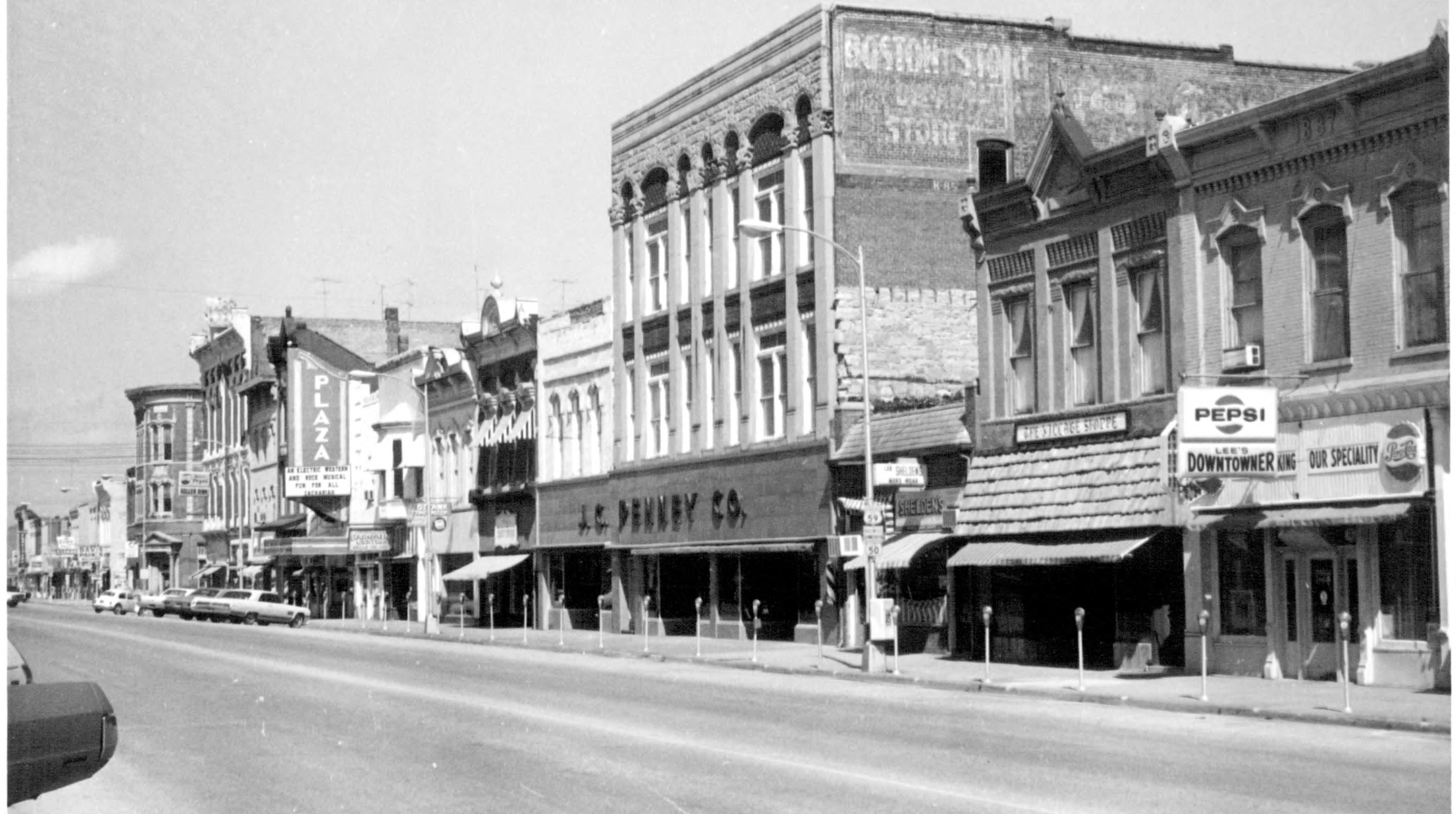
Photo from 1971 NRHP application – theatre far left.

The theatre is part of the Downtown Ottawa Historic District, which was listed June 29, 1972.

== History ==
A donation of historic photographs were presented to the Franklin County Historical Society in 2013 included photos of the theater from the early 20th century. Newspaper stories published in 1905 describe movies being shown by Fred Beeler in the building now occupied by the Plaza Grill and Cinema. "The newspaper editor apparently was a big movie fan because he wrote many articles about what a wonderful cultural enrichment the movies were and what a fascinating and safe place for children during matinee showings," said Deb Barker, executive director of the Franklin County Historical Society. The Historical Society hopes to market the theater as a tourist destination.

The historical evidence and sources proving the history of the cinema are:

Kansas State Historical Society		Pickrell Building 1885
US National Historical Registry		Pickrell Building 1885
Copy of United States Department of Interior Approval		Pickrell Building 1885
1905 Annuls of Ottawa Article		Movie Theatre mention upstairs at 213 S. Main moving quickly to 211 S. Main
1907 Ottawa Kansas City Directory	pg 36	E.E. Wagner, Mngr. 211 S. Main
1910 Ottawa City Directory	pg 58	Crystal Theatre C.J. Clark Propr. 211 S. Main
1913 Ottawa City Directory		Crystal Theatre (A.D. Birch) 211 S. Main
1916 Ottawa City Directory		211 S. Main Propr. W.A. Millington (moving pictures)
1917 Crystal Theatre Fire		Ottawa Herald Story- March 1, 1917 (copy of story)
1917 Ottawa Herald Article		“Washburn & Son are drawing plans for remodeling After fire” (copy of story)
1921 Ottawa City Directory		211 South Main Mgr W.A. Millington
1922 Ottawa City Directory		Crystal Theatre 209 S. Main Mgr. G.E. Klock
1926 Ottawa Herald Ad		For Movies Playing at Crystal
1926 Ottawa Herald Ad		For Movies Playing at Crystal, Ottawa Tele Directory
1929 Ottawa Herald Ad		First Talkie Movies at Crystal
1930 Newspaper Story		Fox Midwest purchased the Crystal and remodeled
1934 City Building Permit		“Plaza” 209 South Main permit for bathroom fixtures
1934 Newspaper Story		Front Page “Reconstruction of Crystal is announced by E.D Dorrel Mgr Fox Theatres
1935 Newspaper Story		February Grand Opening of remodeled Plaza
1935 City Directory	pg 226	Plaza Theatre North Main
1938 City Directory	pg 213	209 South Main
1941 City Directory	pg 202	Plaza Theatre 209 South Main
1946 City Directory	pg 231	Plaza Theatre 209 South Main
1950 City Directory	pg 239	Plaza Theatre 209 South Main
1953 City Directory	pg 218	Plaza Theatre 209 South Main
1955 City Directory	pg 232	Plaza 209 South Main
1957 City Directory	pg 141	Plaza Theatre Eugene Sappington Manager 209 South Main
1959 City Directory	pg 112	Plaza Theatre Eugene Sappinton 209 South Main
1961 City Directory	pg 156	Plaza Theatre Chester A Hylton mgr 209 South
1962 City Directory	pg 125	Plaza Theatre Chester A Hylton mgr 209 South
1964 City Directory	pg 128	Plaza Theatre Leon Roberston Mgr 209 South
1965 City Directory	pg 113	Plaza Theatre Leon Robertson Mgr 209 South
1966 City Directory	pg 104	Plaza Theatre Leon Roberson Mgr 209 South
1967 City Directory	pg 110	Plaza Theatre Frank Banning Mgr 209 south
1969 City Directory	pg 116	Plaza Theatre Joseph Matthews Jr. 209 South
1970 City Directory	pg 103	Plaza Theatre Joseph Matthews Jr. 209 South
1971 City Directory	pg 104	Plaza Theatre Joseph Matthews JR 209 South
1972 City Directory	pg 105	Plaza Theatre Francis Glenn Mgr 209 South Main
1973 City Directory	pg 107	Plaza Theatre Robert Clark Mgr. 209 South Main
1974 City Directory	pg 120	Plaza Theatre Jerry Mason Mgr. 209 South Main
1975 City Directory	pg 113	Plaza Theatre Jerry Mason Mgr. 209 South Main
1976 City Directory	pg 122	Plaza Theatre Wayne Zarachary Mgr 209 South
1977 City Directory	pg 130	Plaza Theatre Wayne Zacachary Mgr 209 South
1979 City Directory	pg 133	Plaza Theatre Joe Matthews JR Mgr 209 South
1980 City Directory	pg 137	Plaza Theatre Daniel Cope Mgr. 209 South Main
1981 City Directory	pg 136	Plaza Theatre Daniel Cope Mgr. 209 South Main
1982 City Directory	pg 132	Plaza Theatre Daniel Cope Mgr. 209 South Main
1983 City Directory	pg 133	Plaza Theatre Danel Cope Mgr.209 South Main
1984 City Directory	pg 142	Plaza Theatre Daniel H. Cope Mgr 209 South Ma
1985 City Directory	pg 149	Plaza Theatre Linda Wrisner Mgr 209 south Main
1986 City Directory	pg 142	Plaza Theatre Scott Maples Mgr. 209 south Main
1987 City Directory	pg 142	Plaza Theatre Steven and Mrs Lee Ann Bagby
1988 City Directory	pg 141	Plaza Theatre Steven and Mrs Lee Ann Bagby
1989 City Directory	pg 151	Plaza Theatre Steven and Mrs Lee Ann Bagby
1990 City Directory	pg 148	Plaza Theatre Steven and Mrs Lee Ann Bagby
1991 City Directory	pg 151	Plaza Theatre Steven and Mrs Lee Ann Bagby
1992 City Directory	pg 38	Plaza Theatre Steven and Mrs Lee Ann Bagby
1993 City Directory	pg 40	Plaza Theatre Steven and Mrs Lee Ann Bagby
1994 City Directory	pg 46	Plaza Theatre Steven and Mrs Lee Ann Bagby
1999 City Directory	pg 44	Plaza Theatre Steven Bagby 209 South Main

The owners after 2000 were:

2000 - 2005	Richard Dimoush
2005 - 2014	Ted & Rita Madl
2014–present	Scott Zaremba
