= Ottawa Municipal Airport =

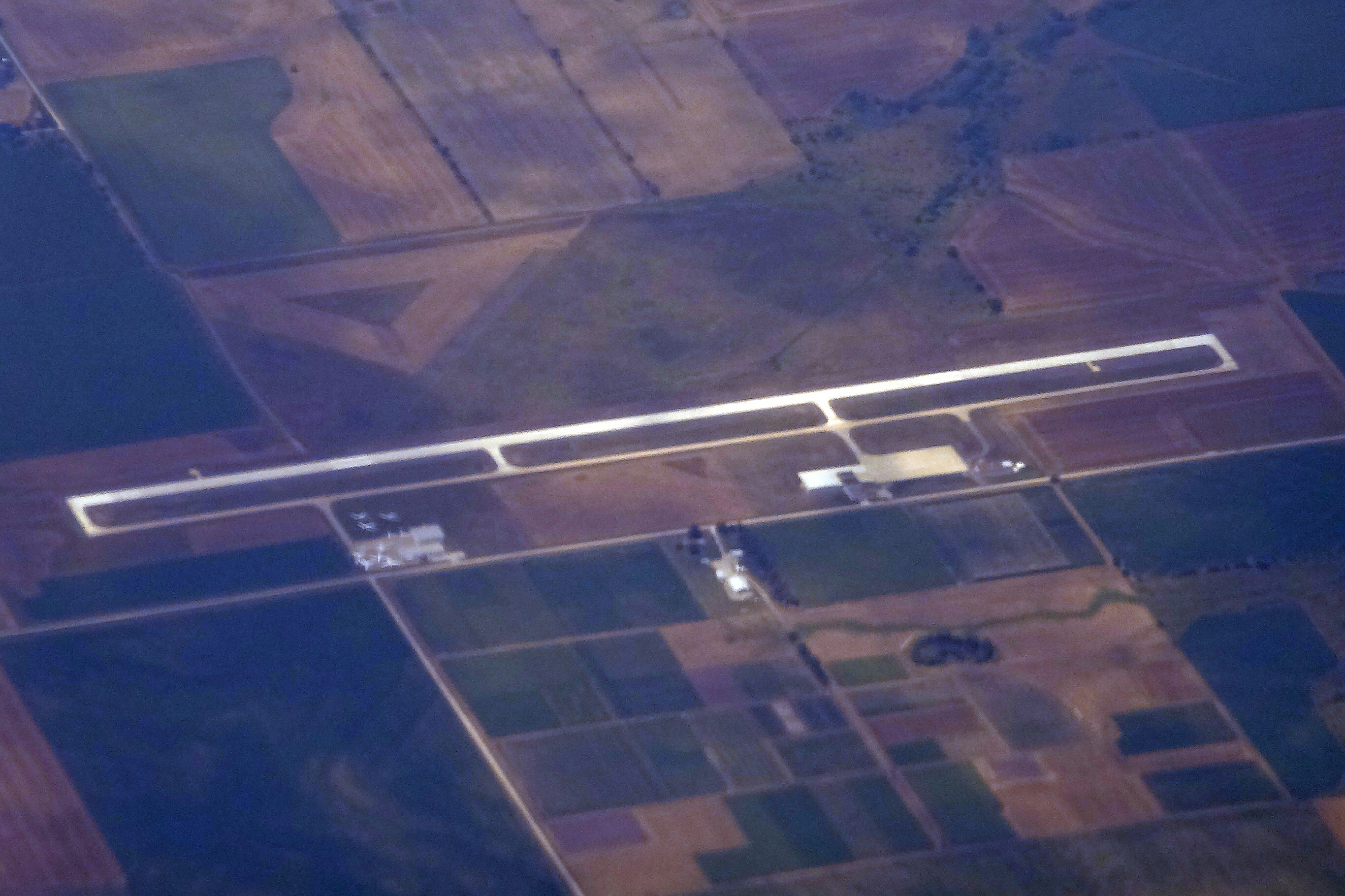
- IATA: none; ICAO: KOWI; FAA LID: OWI

Summary
- Airport type: Public
- Owner: City of Ottawa
- Location: Ottawa, Kansas
- Elevation AMSL: 966.4 ft / 294.6 m
- Coordinates: 38°32′20″N 095°15′10″W
- Website: http://www.ottawaks.gov/...

Map
- Location of airport in Kansas

Runways
Direction	Length		Surface
Direction	ft	m	Surface
17/35	4,500	1,372	Concrete
13/31	1,785	544	Turf

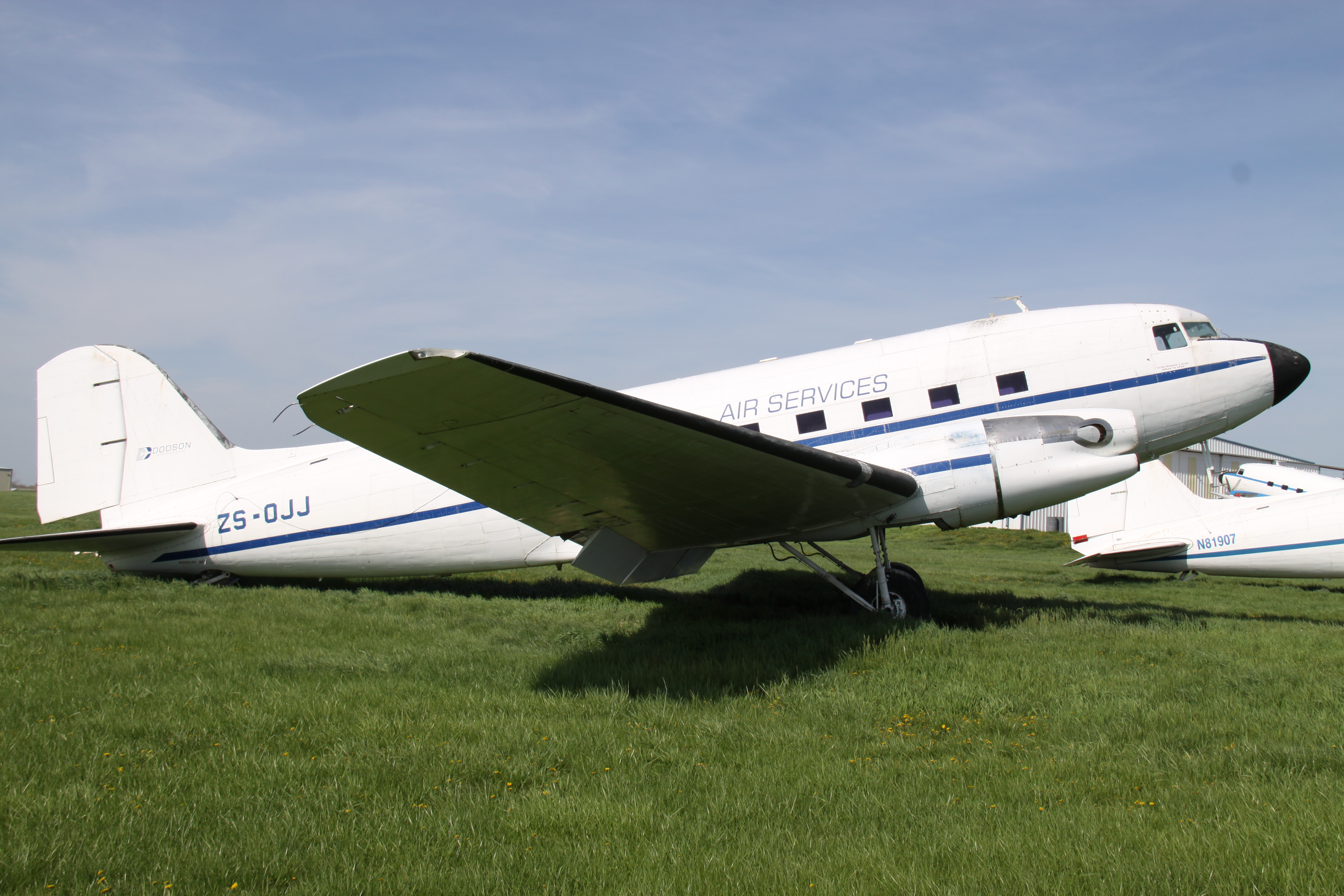
Douglas DC-3 static display

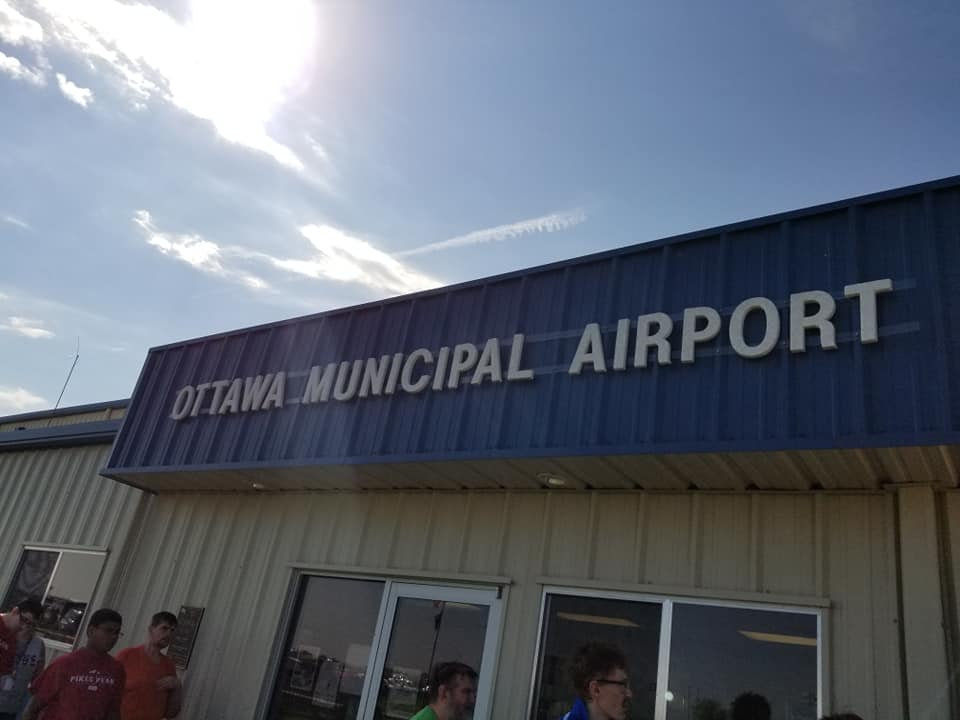
Ottawa (Kansas) Municipal Airport main building

Ottawa Municipal Airport (FAA LID: OWI) is in Ottawa, Kansas, United States, four miles south of Ottawa at 2178 Montana Road.

The airport opened in April 1946. It serves small business jets.

There are two buildings at the airport, and aircraft are stored outside. There is a tiedown hangar, likely replacing the old main hangar that was destroyed on July 8, 2009.

Besides the main runway, there is a grass runway (13/31).

== See also ==
- List of airports in Kansas
