= Chiara Ottaviano =

Italian historian

Chiara Ottaviano (born 1955) is an Italian historian, writer and film director.

== Biography ==
Ottaviano was born in Ragusa in 1955. After obtaining a degree in philosophy, at the University of Catania, thanks to scholarships of Einaudi Foundation of Turin, has done research on social and cultural history in Italy, England and South Africa.

She taught from 1994 at University of Turin and then History and sociology of mass communication, from 1996 to 2012, at the Polytechnic University of Turin

With Peppino Ortoleva founded the Cliomedia Officina, a company that operates in the cultural industry in order to combine historical research at the old and new media and directing it since 1985. In addition to several audiovisual history, Cliomedia produced the film documentary Terramatta, a story on the writer illiterate Vincenzo Rabito, presented at the 69th Venice International Film Festival and winner of the Nastro d'Argento for 2013 Best documentary.

Since 2000, she directed the Historical Archives of Telecom Italia.

In 2013, she founded the Archivio degli Iblei, along the lines of Archivio Diaristico Nazionale, and the latter associated in order to enable the digitization of diaries to make them available to scholars, historians and anthropologists.

She has written numerous essays on the history, curatorial essays and prefaces to other historians.

== Essays ==
- (in Italian) Chiara Ottaviano e Peppino Ortoleva, Cronologia della Storia d'Italia 1815–1990, Novara, DeAgostini, 1991, (new edition I giorni della storia d'Italia dal Risorgimento ad oggi, 1995)
- (in Italian) C. Ottaviano e S. Scaramuzzi, Le famiglie e l'adozione dell'innovazione delle nuove tecnologie della comunicazione. I modelli di consumo e la tradizione degli studi, Venezia, 1997
- (in Italian) Chiara Ottaviano, Mezzi per comunicare. Storia, società e affari dal telegrafo al modem, Turin, Paravia, 1997
- (in Italian) Chiara Ottaviano (a cura di), Nuova Storia Universale. I racconti della storia, Turin, Garzanti, 2004–2005 (vol. VI-IX)
- (in Italian) Chiara Ottaviano e G. Dematteis, L'Italia una e diversa, Milan, Touring Editore, 2010

== Audiovisual ==
- (in Italian) Terramatta, film documentary, Cliomedia Officina for Cinecittà Luce, 2012
- (in Italian) La vita quotidiana degli italiani durante il fascismo, Gruner+Jahr/Mondadori, 3 vol. 2005/2007
- (in Italian) Il Mezzogiorno e la storia d'Italia, Formez, 1992
- (in Italian) Tute blu. Il Novecento operaio a Torino, Rai3, 1987
- (in Italian) Torino laboratorio? A proposito degli ottant'anni dell'Unione Industriale, Rai3, 1986
- (in Italian) Sapere la strada. Storia dell'emigrazione biellese, Rai3, 1986
- (in Italian) Le trasformazioni del paesaggio italiano dal 1945 ad oggi, Loescher, 1996
