= Santa Inoue =

Japanese manga artist and entrepreneur (born 1968)

Santa Inoue 井上 三太
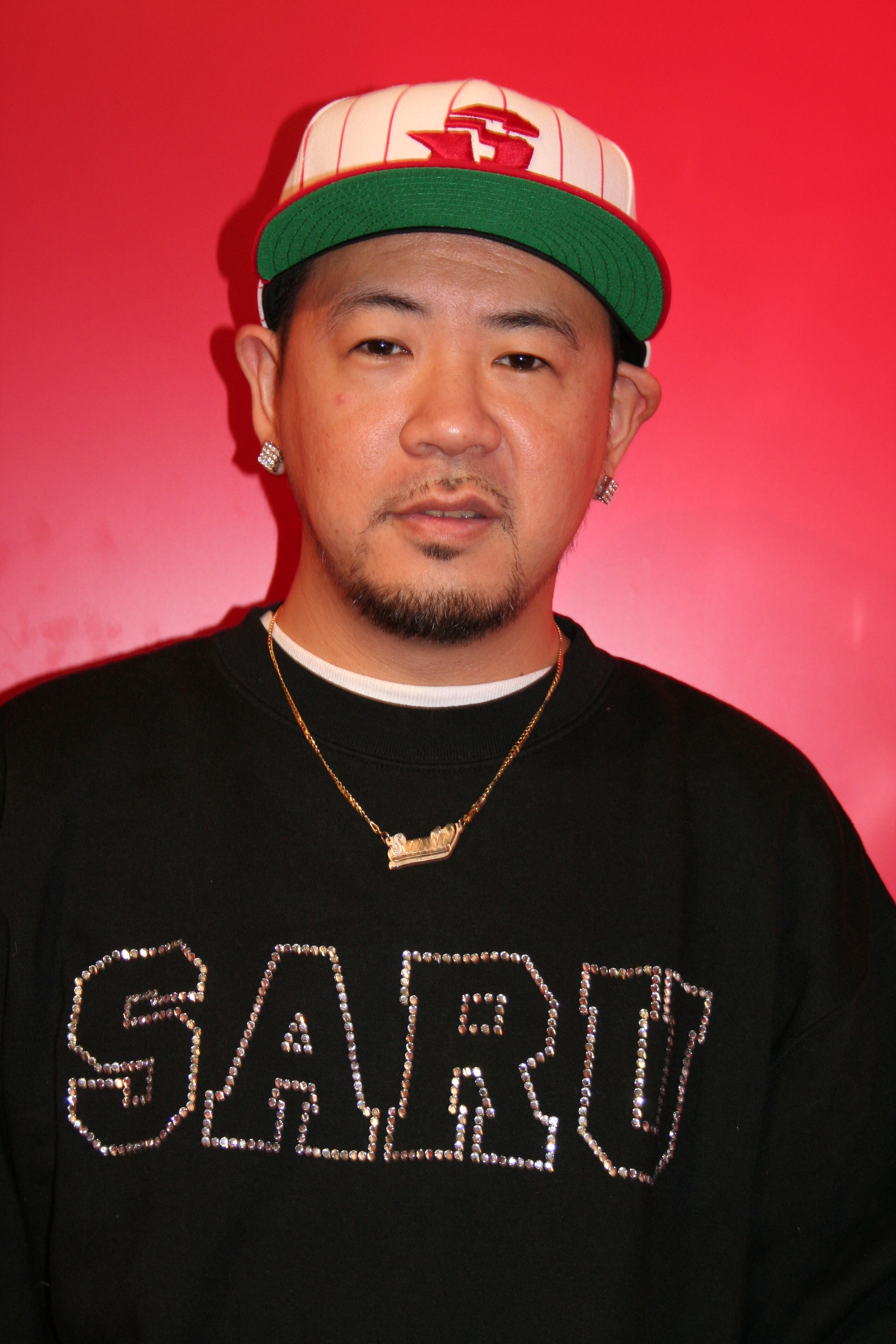
- Santa Inoue in October 2006
- Born: 1968 (age 57–58) Paris, France
- Area: Manga artist
- Notable works: Tokyo Tribes

Santa Inoue (井上 三太, Inoue Santa; born 1968 in Paris, France) is a Japanese manga artist and entrepreneur. His most notable manga was the Tokyo Tribe series of which the manga installment Tokyo Tribe2 (also known as Tokyo Tribes) ran from 1997 to 2005, and was made into an anime series as well as a live-action film. He wrote the horror manga The Neighbor No. Thirteen which was also adapted into a live-action film. His manga series have been influenced by hip hop culture, with some of the characters being modeled after rappers. He owns a clothing and accessories business called Santastic!, and has done artwork on several music album covers.

As of 2018, he currently lives in Los Angeles, California.

== Career ==
=== Early works ===
Inoue's debut manga was Murder in 1989 which was published in Weekly Young Sunday and won the magazine's newcomers prize. In 1990, he had his first manga serialization, Bunpuku Chagama Daimaō, which printed in Weekly Young Sunday. His third work, Tamashii Rettsha, was published straight-to-tankōbon by Yōsensha.

=== The Neighbor No. Thirteen ===
Inoue created the psychological horror manga The Neighbor No. Thirteen, "about a man whose schizophrenic alter ego (Jūzō-gō or Number 13) is reawakened when his former childhood bully becomes his new boss." No. Thirteen was serialized partly in Comic Scholar magazine by Gentosha and was published in tankōbon format under the Birz Comics line. The Neighbor No. Thirteen went on to be published by Gentosha in 1999 The Neighbor No. Thirteen being adapted into a feature film in 2005. Additional pocket bunkobon editions of The Neighbor No. Thirteen were released under the Gentosha Comics Manga Bunko line by Gentosha in 2009 The first volume of Neighbor No. 13 is available on Kindle in English.

=== Tokyo Tribe ===
In 1993, Santa Inoue created Tokyo Tribe, which was first published straight to tankōbon by JICC Shuppankyoku under the Takarajima Comics Deluxe line. Tokyo Tribe was republished by Bijutsu Shuppansha, and was later serialized in Boon fashion magazine in 1997 for Shodensha. In 2003, it was reprinted for Young Jump Comics. In 2005, it was published in tankōbon format by Kodansha. It also had a printing under Inoue's Santastic! Books line in 2009.

=== Tokyo Tribe2 ===
Inoue created a follow-up to Tokyo Tribe called Tokyo Tribe2 which was serialized in Boon by Shodensha. His works attained international acclaim. In 2004, Tokyopop acquired the license to Tokyo Tribe2, renaming it Tokyo Tribes. In the meantime of 2005, the United States edition of Tokyo Tribe2, Tokyo Tribes was nominated for an Eisner Award. In 2006, Tokyo Tribe2 was adapted into an anime series by WOWOW The DVD's of Tokyo Tribe2 were released in 2007. A live-action television pilot is in development by producer Patrick S. Cunningham.

=== Tokyo Tribe3 and other Tokyo titles ===
Inoue worked on several other Tokyo titles. In 2000, Tokyo Drive was serialized in Weekly Young Magazine by Kodansha. In 2001, Tokyo Graffiti was serialized in the Weekly Young Jump magazine by Shueisha.and a flagship store opened in Shibuya, Tokyo. In 2003, Tokyo Graffiti was published by Shueisha under the Young Jump Comics line. In 2007 Tokyo Burger was serialized in urban fashion magazine Ollie by Saneishobo. In 2007 Tokyo Tribe2 Spin off! was serialized in Boon by Shodensha. In 2008, Tokyo Tribe3 began serialization in Ollie. Tokyo Tribe 3 ended in 2012. His latest "Tokyo Tribe" title "Tokyo Tribe Waru" is serialized in the Bessatu Young Champion and publishing by Akita Publishing.

=== Other works ===
In 1995, Mon Mon was serialized in Manga Pachinker published by Byakuya Shobo, Tirauchi Kantaro was serialized in Rockin' on Japan, and Born 2 Die was serialized in Quick Japan by Ota Shuppan. A short story compilation entitled Santa Inoue was published by Shodensha under the Feel Comics line and in the same year of 1996. In 1997 Mon Mon was finally published by Byakuya Shobo. Born 2 Die, an urban action drama, was published by Ota Shuppan in 1998. In 2002, the second compilation book was published, Santa Inoue2.

Inoue made a brief appearance on the American show Extreme Makeover: Home Edition in 2004 where he painted a manga/anime-themed mural in one of the bedrooms.

In 2005, Inoue collaborated with Samurai fashion magazine to make the single issue, Samurai VS Santa Inoue. In 2006, Shodensha helped publish the single issue magazine Santastic! Magazine "Saru". Santa Inoue created promotional drawings for T.I.'s Paper Trail also in 2008. In 2009, Santa Inoue worked on Dan da Barbarian, which was serialized in Comic Birz. Dan da Barbarian finished in 2012. He launched a romance manga called Motesuke in 2013, which debuted in Akita Shoten's Young Champion magazine and also released English version on Amazon Kindle. Santa Inoue also made original LINE stamp "Tokyo Tribe" and "Kumatta-kun".

He also did art for the Japanese release of Straight Outta Compton and BlacKkKlansman.

=== Business ventures ===
Inoue developed a merchandise line called Santastic! Entertainment. The line consists of clothing, jewelry and accessories. A television web series was also produced. Inoue's shops have opened in Shibuya, Tokyo and Shanghai, China. In addition to music and merchandise, Inoue has designed the artwork for several album covers, most notably for De La Soul. He also produced a CD called Drivin' Wiz My Homies.

== Works ==
=== Manga ===
Title	Year	Notes	Refs
Murder (まぁだぁ)	1989	Serialized in Weekly Young Sunday; Newcomers Prize	
Bunpuku Chagama Daimaō (ぶんぷくちゃがま大魔王; lit. Lucky charm teapot great devil king)	1990	Serialized in Weekly Young Sunday; Published Dobun comics in 1 volume	
(魂列車; Tamashii Ressha) lit. Soul Train	1992	Published straight-to-tankobon by Yōsensha in 1 volume	
Tokyo Tribe	1993	Published straight-to-volume by Takarajima Comics Deluxe (JICC) in 1 volume	
The Neighbor No. Thirteen	1994	Published in Comic Scholar (partly) and Birz Comics (tankobon) by Gentosha, 3 volumes	
Mon Mon (モンモン)	1995	Serialized in Manga Pachinker; Published by Byakuya Shobo, 1 volume	
Tirauchi Kantarō (ティラウチ完太郎)	1995	Serialized in Rockin' on Japan; Published by Feel Comics (Shodensha), 1 volume	
Born 2 Die	1995	Serialized in Quick Japan; Published by Birz Comics, Ohta Publishing, 1 volume	
Santa Inoue (井上三太)	1996	Short story compilation Published by Feel Comics (Shodensha), 1 volume	
Tokyo Tribes (TOKYO TRIBE2)	1997–2005	Serialized in Boon magazine Published by Shodensha, 12 volumes	
Tokyo Drive	2000	Serialized in Weekly Young Magazine; Published by KC Deluxe (Kodansha), 1 volume	
Tokyo Graffiti	2001	Serialized in Weekly Young Jump; Published by Shueisha, 2 volumes	
Santa Inoue2 (井上三太2)	2002	Short story compilation Published by Feel Comics (Shodensha), 1 volume	
Tokyo Burger	2007	Serialized in Ollie magazine Published in 1 volume	
Tokyo Tribe2 Spin Off! ja:TOKYO TRIBE2 SpinOff!	2008	Published in various magazines	
Tokyo Tribe 3	2008–12	Serialized in Ollie magazine Published by Gentosha, 5 volumes	
Dan Da Barbarian	2009–12	Serialized in Comic Birz, 2 volumes Published by Gentosha, 2 volumes	
Motesuke (もて介)	2013	Serialized in Young Champion; Published by Akita Publishing, 2 volumes English version Kindle	
Tokyo Tribe Waru	2016	Serialized in Young Champion; Published by Akita Publishing	
Gui Gui Ryoku	2018	Published by Pal Publishing	

== Filmography ==
List of live-action appearances on television and film
Year	Title	Role	Notes	Source
2004	Extreme Makeover: Home Edition	Himself / Muralist	Ep. "The Grinnan Family"	
