= 69th Venice International Film Festival =

Italian film festival in 2012

- Festival poster
- Opening film: The Reluctant Fundamentalist
- Closing film: The Man Who Laughs
- Location: Venice, Italy
- Founded: 1932
- Awards: Golden Lion: Pietà
- Hosted by: Kasia Smutniak
- Artistic director: Alberto Barbera
- Festival date: 29 August – 8 September 2012
- Website: Website

Venice Film Festival chronology
- 70th 68th

The 69th annual Venice International Film Festival, was held from 29 August to 8 September 2012, at Venice Lido in Italy.

American filmmaker Michael Mann was the jury president for the main competition. Polish actress Kasia Smutniak was the Host of the opening and closing ceremonies. The Golden Lion was awarded to Pietà by Kim Ki-duk.

The festival opened with The Reluctant Fundamentalist by Mira Nair, and closed with The Man Who Laughs by Jean-Pierre Ameris.

== Juries ==
=== Main competition (Venezia 69) ===
- Michael Mann, American filmmaker - Jury President
- Marina Abramović, Serbian performance artist
- Laetitia Casta, French actress
- Peter Ho-sun Chan, Hong Kong filmmaker
- Ari Folman, Israeli filmmaker
- Matteo Garrone, Italian filmmaker
- Ursula Meier, French-Swiss filmmaker
- Samantha Morton, English actress and director
- Pablo Trapero, Argentine director

=== Orizzonti ===
- Pierfrancesco Favino, Italian actor - Jury President
- Sandra den Hamer, Dutch director of the International Film Festival Rotterdam
- Runa Islam, Bangladeshi-born British visual artist and filmmaker
- Jason Kliot, American independent producer
- Nadine Labaki, Lebanese actress and filmmaker
- Milcho Manchevski, Macedonian filmmaker
- Amir Naderi, Iranian film filmmaker and photographer

=== Opera Prima (Venice Award for a Debut Film) ===
- Shekhar Kapur, Indian film director, actor and producer - Jury President
- Michel Demopoulos, Greek film critic
- Isabella Ferrari, Italian actress
- Matt Reeves, American filmmaker and producer
- Bob Sinclar, French record producer, DJ, and Yellow Productions owner

== Official Sections ==
=== In Competition ===
The following films were selected for the main competition:

English title	Original title	Director(s)	Production country
At Any Price		Ramin Bahrani	United States
Betrayal	Измена	Kirill Serebrennikov	Russia
Dormant Beauty	Bella addormentata	Marco Bellocchio	Italy, France
The Fifth Season	La cinquième saison	Peter Brosens, Jessica Woodworth	Belgium, Netherlands, France
Fill the Void	למלא את החלל	Rama Burshtein	Israel
It Was the Son	È stato il figlio	Daniele Ciprì	Italy
Lines of Wellington	Linhas de Wellington	Valeria Sarmiento	Portugal, France
The Master		Paul Thomas Anderson	United States
Beyond Outrage	アウトレイジ ビヨンド	Takeshi Kitano	Japan
Paradise: Faith	Paradies: Glaube	Ulrich Seidl	Austria, France, Germany
Passion		Brian De Palma	France, Germany
Pietà	피에타	Kim Ki-duk	South Korea
Something in the Air	Après mai	Olivier Assayas	France
A Special Day	Un giorno speciale	Francesca Comencini	Italy
Spring Breakers		Harmony Korine	United States
Superstar		Xavier Giannoli	France, Belgium
Thy Womb	Sinapupunan	Brillante Mendoza	Philippines
To the Wonder		Terrence Malick	United States

=== Out of Competition ===
The following films were selected for the out of competition section:

English title	Original title	Director(s)	Production country
Fiction
Bait 3D		Kimble Rendall	Australia, Singapore
The Company You Keep		Robert Redford	United States
Disconnect		Henry-Alex Rubin	United States
Forgotten	Du hast es versprochen	Alex Schmidt	Germany
Gebo and the Shadow	O Gebo e a Sombra	Manoel de Oliveira	Portugal, France
The Iceman		Ariel Vromen	United States
Looking for Hortense	Cherchez Hortense	Pascal Bonitzer	France
Love Is All You Need	Den Skaldede Frisør	Susanne Bier	Denmark, Sweden
The Man Who Laughs (closing film)	L’homme qui rit	Jean-Pierre Ameris	France, Czech Republic
Penance (episodes 1-5)	贖罪	Kiyoshi Kurosawa	Japan
The Reluctant Fundamentalist (opening film)		Mira Nair	India, Pakistan, United States
Tai Chi 0	太極：從零開始	Stephen Fung	China
Non-fiction
Bad 25		Spike Lee	United States
Enzo Avitabile Music Life		Jonathan Demme	Italy, United States
Lullabye to My Father		Amos Gitai	Israel, France, Switzerland
Peter Brook: The Tightrope		Simon Brook	United Kingdom, France, Italy
Special Screenings
Anton’s Right Here	Anton tut ryadom	Lyubov Arkus	Russia
Clarisse		Liliana Cavani	Italy
Come voglio che sia il mio futuro		Maurizio Zaccaro	Italy
The Human Cargo	La nave dolce	Daniele Vicari	Italy, Albania
Impenetrable	El impenetrable	Daniele Incalcaterra, Fausta Quattrini	Argentina, France
It Was Better Tomorrow	Ya man aach	Hinde Boujemaa	Tunisia
Medici con l'Africa		Carlo Mazzacurati	Italy
Sfiorando Il Muro		Silvia Giralucci, Luca Ricciardi	Italy
Witness: Libya		Abdallah Omeish	United States

=== Orizzonti ===
The following films were selected for the Horizons (Orizzonti) section:

English title	Original title	Director(s)	Production country
In Competition
Araf - Somewhere in Between	Araf	Yeşim Ustaoğlu	Turkey
Balancing Act	Gli equilibristi	Ivano De Matteo	Italy, France
Boxing Day		Bernard Rose	United Kingdom, United States
The Cutoff Man	Menatek Ha-Maim	Idan Hubel	Israel
Fly with the Crane	告訴他們，我乘白鶴去了	Li Ruijun	China
A Hijacking	Kapringen	Tobias Lindholm	Denmark
The Interval	L'intervallo	Leonardo Di Costanzo	Italy, Switzerland, Germany
Lions	Leones	Jazmin Lopez	Argentina, France, Netherlands
Low Tide		Roberto Minervini	United States, Italy, Belgium
Me Too	Ja tozhe hochu	Aleksei Balabanov	Russia
The Paternal House	Khanéh Pedari	Kianoosh Ayari	Iran
Pretty Butterflies	Bellas mariposas	Salvatore Mereu	Italy
Tango libre		Frédéric Fonteyne	Belgium, France, Luxembourg
Three Sisters	三姊妹	Wang Bing	China, France, Hong Kong
Wadjda	وجدة	Haifaa al-Mansour	Saudi Arabia, Germany
Winter of Discontent	الشتا إللى فات	Ibrahim El Batout	Egypt
Yema		Djamila Sahraoui	Algeria, France
The Millennial Rapture	Sennen no yuraku	Koji Wakamatsu	Japan
Short Films Competition
Cargo		Carlo Sironi	Italy
Diamond Sutra	Jingang Jing	Tsai Ming-liang	Taiwan
The Flute	Bansulli	Min Bham	Nepal
Frank-Étienne vers la béatitude		Constance Meyer	France
I’m the One		Paola Morabito	Australia
Invitation	Cho-De	Min-Young Yoo	South Korea
Living Still Life		Bertrand Mandico	France, Belgium, Germany
Luisa no está en casa		Celia Rico Clavellino	Spain
Out Of Frame	Titloi telous	Yorgos Zois	Greece
Las manos limpias		Carlos Armella	Mexico
Marla		Nick King	Australia
Miracle Boy		Jake Mahaffy	United States
Resistance	Resistente	Renate Costa Perdomo, Salla Sorri	Denmark, Paraguay, Finland
La sala		Alessio Giannone	Italy
The Tuner	O Afinador	Fernando Camargo, Matheus Parizi	Brazil

=== Venice Classics ===
The following selection of restored classic films and documentaries on cinema were screened for this section:

English title	Original title	Director(s)	Production country
Restored Films
The 10th Victim (1965)	La decima vittima	Elio Petri	Italy
American Dreams (1984)		James Benning	United States
Carmen Comes Home (1951)	カルメン故郷に帰る	Kinoshita Keisuke	Japan
Chimes at Midnight (1965)	Campanadas a medianoche	Orson Welles	Spain
Fanny and Alexander (1982)	Fanny och Alexander	Ingmar Bergman	Sweden
Gentlemen Prefer Blondes (1953)		Howard Hawks	United States
The Ghost and Mrs. Muir (1947)		Joseph L. Mankiewicz	United States
Heaven’s Gate (1980)		Michael Cimino	United States
Miracle (1982)	Himala	Ishmael Bernal	Philippines
Investigation of a Citizen Above Suspicion (1970)	Indagine su un cittadino al di sopra di ogni sospetto	Elio Petri	Italy
The Mattei Affair (1972)	Il caso Mattei	Francesco Rosi	Italy
Pigsty (1969)	Porcile	Pier Paolo Pasolini	Italy
Red Shirts (1952)	Camicie rosse	Goffredo Alessandrini, Francesco Rosi	Italy
Stromboli (1950)	Stromboli, terra di Dio	Roberto Rossellini	Italy
Sunset Boulevard (1950)		Billy Wilder	United States
Tell Me Lies (1968)		Peter Brook	United Kingdom
To Be Twenty in the Aures (1972)	Avoir 20 ans dans les Aurès	René Vautier	France
Documentaries about Cinema
Las versiones de campanadas a medianoche de Orson Welles		Luciano Berriatúa	Spain
Monicelli: La versione di Mario		Mario Canale, Felice Farina, Mario Gianni, Wilma Labate, Annarosa Morri	Italy
Gli anni delle immagini perdute		Adolfo Conti	Italy
Dreamers	Conteurs d'images	Noelle Deschamps	France
Dai nostri inviati alla Mostra di Venezia		Giuseppe Giannotti, Enrico Salvatori, Davide Savelli	Italy
Harry Dean Stanton: Partly Fiction		Sophie Huber	United States, Switzerland
Miradas múltiples (La máquina loca)		Emilio Maillé	Mexico, France, Spain
La guerra dei vulcani		Francesco Patierno	Italy
Valentino's Ghost		Michael Singh	United States, India
Sedia Elettrica: il making of del film Io e Te		Monica Strambini	Italy

=== «80!» ===
The following rare films from the Biennale's Historical Archives were screened for this retrospective section:

English Title	Original title	Director(s)	Production country
Ahora te vamos a llamar hermano (1971)		Raoul Ruiz	Chile
A Bagful of Fleas (1963)	Pytel blech	Vera Chytilová	Czechoslovakia
The Brigand (1961)	Il brigante	Renato Castellani	Italy
God Needs Man (1950)	Dieu a besoin des hommes	Jean Delannoy	France
Free at Last (1968)		Gregory Shuker, James Desmond, Nicholas Proferes	United States
Genghis Khan (1950)		Manuel Conde, Salvador Lou	Philippines
The Last Night (1936)	Poslednjaja noc’	Julij Jakovlevic Rajzman	Soviet Union
Mud-Covered City (1963)	Zablácené Mesto	Václav Táborský	Czechoslovakia
Pagine chiuse (1968)		Gianni Da Campo	Italy
Stress Is Three (1968)	Stress-es tres-tres	Carlos Saura	Spain

=== Special Screenings ===
The following films of the Official Selection were presented as Special Screenings:

Original Title	Director(s)	Production country
Carmel (2009)	Amos Gitai	Israel, France, Italy
Convitto Falcone	Pasquale Scimeca	Italy
Hommage to Simone Massi	Simone Massi	Italy

== Independent Sections ==
=== Venice International Film Critics' Week ===
The following films were selected for the Critics' Week:

English title	Original title	Director(s)	Production country
In competition
Eat Sleep Die	Äta sova dö	Gabriela Pichler	Sweden
The Ideal City	La città ideale	Luigi Lo Cascio	Italy
Mold	Küf	Ali Aydın	Turkey, Germany
A Month in Thailand	O luna in Thailandia	Paul Negoescu	Romania
She Doesn't Want to Sleep Alone	No quiero dormir sola	Natalia Beristain	Mexico
Welcome Home		Tom Heene	Belgium
Lotus	Xiao he	Liu Shu	China
Out of Competition
Water (Opening film)		Nir Sa'ar, Maya Sarfaty, Mohammad Fuad, Yona Rozenkier, Mohammad Bakri, Ahmad Bargouthi, Pini Tavger, Tal Haring	Israel, Palestine, France
Kiss of the Damned (closing film)		Xan Cassavetes	United States

=== Venice Days ===
The following films were selected for the Venice Days section:

English title	Original title	Director(s)	Production country
In competition
Blondie		Jesper Ganslandt	Sweden
Crawl		Hervé Lasgouttes	France
Epilogue	Hayuta ve Berl	Amir Manor	Israel
Il Gemello		Vincenzo Marra	Italy
Inheritance	Héritage	Hiam Abbass	France, Israel, Turkey
Keep Smiling	Gaigimet	Rusudan Chkonia	France, Georgia, Luxembourg
Kinshasa Kids		Marc-Henri Wajnberg	Belgium, France
Pinocchio		Enzo D'Alò	Italy, France, Belgium, Luxembourg
Queen of Montreuil		Sólveig Anspach	France
Steel	Acciaio	Stefano Mordini	Italy
Stories We Tell		Sarah Polley	Canada
The Weight	무게	Jeon Kyu-hwan	South Korea
Special Events
Terramatta		Costanza Quatriglio	Italy
Non mi avete convinto		Filippo Vendemmiati	Italy
Bob Wilson's Life and Death of Marina Abramović		Giada Colagrande	Italy
L'uomo che amava il cinema		Marco Segato	Italy
6 sull'autobus		Simone Dante Antonelli, Giacomo Bisordi, Rita de Donato, Irene di Lelio, Antonio Ligas, Emiliano Russo	Italy
Venice Nights
Le cose belle		Agostino Ferrente, Giovanni Piperno	Italy
Francesco De Gregori. Finestre rotte		Stefano Pistolini	Italy
The Golden Temple		Enrico Masi	Italy, United Kingdom
My Friend Johnny		Alessandra Cardone	Italy
Nozze d'Agosto		Andrea Parena	Italy
Il risveglio del fiume segreto		Alessandro Scillitani	Italy
Tralala		Masbedo	Italy
Miu Miu Women's Tales
It’s Getting Late		Massy Tadjedin	Italy, United States
Meshes of the Afternoon (1943)		Maya Deren	United States
Muta		Lucrecia Martel	Italy, Argentina, Paraguay
The Powder Room		Zoe Cassavetes	Italy, United Kingdom
The Woman Dress		Giada Colagrande	Italy, United States
Special Projects (Cinema Corsaro)
Gli intrepidi		Giovanni Cioni	Italy
Iolanda tra bimba e corsara		Tonino De Bernardi	Italy
Games		Alessio Di Zio	United States
Fame in California		Alessio Di Zio	United States
Tacoma		Alessio Di Zio	United States
Vers Madrid: The Burning Bright		Sylvain George	Spain, France
Le tigri di Mompracem (TV Mini-Series 1974)		Ugo Gregoretti	Italy
Carmela, Saved by the Buccaneers	Carmela, salvata dai filibustieri	Giovanni Maderna, Mauro Santini	Italy
Materiali preparatori inediti per il film: "Altrove"		Corso Salani	Italy
Egh c'è e non c'è - Carta bianca a Enrico Ghezzi		Enrico Ghezzi	Italy
Lux Prize
Just the Wind	Csak a szél	Benedek Fliegauf	Hungary
Shun Li and the Poet	Io sono Li	Andrea Segre	Italy
Tabu		Miguel Gomes	Portugal, Germany, Brazil, France

== Official Awards ==
=== In Competition (Venezia 69) ===
- Golden Lion: Pietà by Kim Ki-duk
- Silver Lion for Best Director: Paul Thomas Anderson for The Master
- Special Jury Prize: Paradise: Faith by Ulrich Seidl
- Volpi Cup for Best Actor: Philip Seymour Hoffman and Joaquin Phoenix for The Master
- Volpi Cup for Best Actress: Hadas Yaron for Fill the Void
- Marcello Mastroianni Award: Fabrizio Falco for Dormant Beauty and It Was the Son
- Golden Osella for Best Screenplay: Olivier Assayas for Something in the Air
- Golden Osella for Best Cinematography: Daniele Ciprì for It Was the Son

=== Golden Lion for Lifetime Achievement ===
- Francesco Rosi

=== Horizons (Orizzonti) ===
- Best Film: Three Sisters by Wang Bing
- Special Jury Prize: Tango libre by Frédéric Fonteyne
- Horizons YouTube Award for Best Short Film: Invitation by Min-Young Yoo
- European Film Awards (short film): Out Of Frame by Yorgos Zois

=== "Luigi de Laurentiis" Award for a Debut Film ===
- Mold by Ali Aydın

== Independent Sections Awards ==
=== Venice International Film Critics' Week ===
- "RaroVideo" Audience Award: Eat Sleep Die by Gabriela Pichler
- Arca CinemaGiovani Award for Best Italian film: The Ideal City by Luigi Lo Cascio

=== Venice Days (Giornati degli Autori) ===
- Label Europa Cinemas Award: Crawl by Hervé Lasgouttes
- Lina Mangiacapre Award: Queen of Montreuil by Sólveig Anspach
- Premio Cinematografico “Civitas Vitae prossima” Award: Terramatta by Costanza Quatriglio

== Independent Awards ==
The following collateral awards were conferred to films of the official selection:

=== FIPRESCI Awards ===
- Best Film (Main competition): The Master by Paul Thomas Anderson
- Best Film (Horizons): The Interval by Leonardo Di Costanzo

=== Queer Lion ===
- The Weight by Jeon Kyu-hwan

=== SIGNIS Award ===
- To the Wonder by Terrence Malick
  - Special mention: Fill the Void by Rama Burshtein

=== Special awards ===
- Persol Tribute to Visionary Talent Award: Michael Cimino
- Jaeger-LeCoultre Glory to the Filmmaker Award: Spike Lee
- L’Oréal Paris per il Cinema Award: Giulia Bevilacqua

=== Francesco Pasinetti (SNGCI) Award ===
- Best Film: The Interval by Leonardo Di Costanzo
- Best Documentary: The Human Cargo by Daniele Vicari
- Best Actor: Valerio Mastandrea for Balancing Act
- Pasinetti Speciale: Clarisse by Liliana Cavani

=== Leoncino d'Oro Agiscuola Award ===
- Pieta by Kim Ki-duk

=== Cinema for UNICEF mention ===
- It Was the Son by Daniele Ciprì

=== Brian Award ===
- Dormant Beauty by Marco Bellocchio

=== Arca CinemaGiovani Award - Venezia 69 ===
- The Fifth Season by Peter Brosens and Jessica Woodworth

=== Biografilm Lancia Award ===
- The Human Cargo by Daniele Vicari
- Bad25 by Spike Lee

=== Bisato d'Oro Award ===
- Best Film: Bellas Mariposas by Salvatore Mereu
- Best Director: Jazmín López for Lions
- Best Actress: Nora Aunor for Thy Womb

=== CICT - UNESCO "Enrico Fulchignoni" Award ===
- The Interval by Leonardo Di Costanzo

=== CICAE - Cinema d’Arte e d’Essai Award ===
- Wadjda by Haifaa Al Mansour

=== CinemAvvenire Award ===
- Best film - Venezia 69: Paradies: Glaube by Ulrich Seidl
- Best film - Il cerchio non è rotondo: Wadjda by Haifaa al-Mansour

=== FEDIC Award ===
- The Interval by Leonardo Di Costanzo
  - Special mention: Bellas Mariposas by Salvatore Mereu

=== Fondazione Mimmo Rotella Award ===
- Something in the Air by Olivier Assayas

=== Future Film Festival Digital Award ===
- Bad25 by Spike Lee
  - Special mention: Spring Breakers by Harmony Korine

=== P. Nazareno Taddei Award ===
- Pieta by Kim Ki-duk
  - Special mention: Thy Womb by Brillante Mendoza

=== Lanterna Magica (CGS) Award ===
- The Interval by Leonardo Di Costanzo

=== Open Award ===
- The Company You Keep by Robert Redford

=== La Navicella – Venezia Cinema Award ===
- Thy Womb by Brillante Mendoza

=== AIF - FORFILMFEST Award ===
- The Interval by Leonardo Di Costanzo

=== Golden Mouse ===
- Pieta by Kim Ki-duk
- Silver Mouse: Anton's Right Here by Lyubov Arkus

=== UK - Italy Creative Industries Award – Best Innovative Budget Award ===
- The Interval by Leonardo Di Costanzo

=== Gillo Pontecorvo - Arcobaleno Latino Award ===
- Laura Delli Colli

=== Christopher D. Smithers Foundation Award ===
- Low Tide by Roberto Minervini

=== Interfilm Award for Promoting Interreligious Dialogue ===
- Wadjda by Haifaa Al Mansour

=== Giovani Giurati del Vittorio Veneto Film Festival Award ===
- The Company You Keep by Robert Redford
  - Special mention: Toni Servillo for It Was the Son

=== Green Drop Award ===
- The Fifth Season by Peter Brosens and Jessica Woodworth

== Controversy over Golden Lion ==
The jury led by filmmaker Michael Mann originally was to award the top Golden Lion prize to Paul Thomas Anderson's The Master, along with the Silver Lion Best Director award and the Best Actor award. However, because of festival's new rule prohibiting pairing the Golden Lion with any other prizes, the jury was asked "to re-deliberate to remove" one of the awards for The Master, and the Golden Lion was awarded to Kim Ki-duk's Pietà instead. On the other hand, the jury was planned to award the Coppa Volpi for the Best Actress prize to Jo Min-su, who acted Jang Mi-sun in Pietà. However, because of the festival's new rule, the jury couldn't award a prize to Jo Min-su. In the official reception which was held after the festival was over, many juries, such as Samantha Morton and Peter Chan met Jo, saying that "Jo's acting was touching that changed my life. I shed tears of Jo's play."
