= Extreme Makeover: Home Edition season 1 =

Extreme Makeover: Home Edition
- Season 1
- No. of episodes: 13

Release
- Original network: ABC
- Original release: February 15 – July 18, 2004

Season chronology
- Next → Season 2

This is a list of season 1 episodes of the Extreme Makeover: Home Edition series.

== Episodes ==
No. overall	No. in season	Title	Location	Original release date	Prod. code
1	1	"The Powers Family"	Santa Clarita, California	February 15, 2004	101
The Design Team launch their cross country building expectation beginning with a family that was in the process of renovating their home when Olivia, the youngest daughter, was diagnosed with a life-threatening form of leukemia. Everything was put on hold while she received treatment. (Note: This was the pilot episode.) Ty's secret room – Olivia's dollhouse-themed bedroom (Ty's very first secret project); Design team – Ty, Constance, Michael, Paul, Preston, and Tracy First appearance of Ty Pennington, Constance Ramos, Michael Moloney, Paul DiMeo, Preston Sharp, and Tracy Hutson Builder - Pat & Mike Shinn, Behr Construction
2	2	"The Woslum Family"	Palmdale, California	February 22, 2004	102
Trent Woslum was serving in Iraq when he received an email from his wife that they had been contacted by the show to receive an Extreme Makeover. Trent's wife, Dawna, and their three sons were sent to Disneyland for the week while the house was renovated. They were surprised on their return to find that Trent was home. Ty's Secret Room - The boys' bathroom (the only time Ty took on a bathroom as a secret project); Design team – Ty, Constance, Michael, Paul, Preston, and Tracy Special Guest - Los Angeles Dodgers
3	3	"The Cox Family"	Simi Valley, California	March 7, 2004	103
Jack Cox is a youth pastor whose wife, Wendy, is a stay-at-home mom raising three girls. The design team remodeled the house for the family. Ty's secret room - A backyard that Ty calls "Tyland"; Design team – Ty, Constance, Michael, Paul, Preston, and Tracy Special guest – LeAnn Rimes
4	4	"The Mendoza Family"	Van Nuys, California	March 21, 2004	104
Contessa Mendoza is a social worker and a single mother, who also chose to take in two foster kids. The team also customized the car of the older foster child. Ty's secret room - Analicia's undersea-themed room Design team – Ty, Constance, Michael, Paul, Preston, and Tracy Special guest - NASA Astronaut Commander Robert Curbeam
5	5	"The McCrory Family"	Costa Mesa, California	March 28, 2004	105
The McCrory family was a family of four that was pregnant with triplets. Grandma, who had come to help take care of the family, was sleeping out in the garage. The team expanded the house to make room for Grandma and all the new babies. Ty's secret room – Tom's "sports bar" garage Design team – Ty, Alle, Michael, Preston, and Paige First appearance of Alle Ghadban and Paige Hemmis
6	6	"The Harris Family"	Watts, California	April 11, 2004	106
"Sweet" Alice Harris is a woman in South Los Angeles who has worked for 35 years to help her neighborhood. Her block, and her home, was flooded in a storm. Her husband, daughter, and two grandchildren also live in the house with her. The team also worked on several projects around the neighborhood. Ty's secret room - A dorm room for where visitors can sleep in Design team – Ty, Constance, Dawson, Paul, and Tracy First appearance of Dawson Connor
7	7	"The Zitek Family"	Ventura, California	April 18, 2004	107
Robert Gil was in a car accident that left him paralyzed from the neck down. His mom quit her job to give him full-time care. The design team renovated the house to make his life easier including an aquatic therapy pool. Ty's secret room - Andrew's car-themed room Design team – Ty, Constance, Dawson, Michael, and Paul
8	8	"The Hardin Family"	Phelan, California	April 25, 2004	108
After tracking down his father, Freeman Hardin, Jr. brought him to live with his family. They had no place for him to stay in the house, so he was living in a trailer. Ty’s secret room – Ty converted the trailer into a state-of-the-art movie theater. Design team – Ty, Alle, Paige, Preston, Tracy
9	9	"The Tugwell Family"	Long Beach, California	May 2, 2004	109
An SUV crashed into the house of the Tugwell family. No one was injured but a large part of the house was destroyed. The Extreme Makeover team also helped arrange for the engagement of the Tugwell’s daughter to her boyfriend. Ty’s secret room – Ty created a secret storage room off of the den. Design team – Ty, Alle, Paul, Preston, Tracy
10	10	"The Walswick Family"	Yorba Linda, California	May 9, 2004	110
Martha Walswick lost her husband to cancer, leaving her to raise nine children alone. The nine children and mom were crammed into a very small home, which the team expanded to give all the kids bigger bedrooms and more common space. (Note: J.J. Carrell, who nominated the Walswick family for the makeover, had also lost his wife to cancer, had started a relationship with Constance while they were building the house. They were later engaged.) Ty’s secret room – Ty worked on Philip and Gregory's bedroom. Design team – Ty, Constance, Dawson, Michael, Paige Builders - John Toleman: 1. & R Construction
11	11	"The Powell Family"	Arleta, California	May 16, 2004	111
Keenan Powell, a 16-year-old boy, lived with major mold and dust allergies. His mom, Carrie, has had a hard time keeping up with all of his health challenges and trying to keep the house as hypo-allergenic as possible. The team re-did the house, including installing a state-of-the-art air filtration system. Ty's secret room - Keenan's basketball-themed room Design team – Ty, Alle, Dawson, Michael, Paige; Special guests – The Harlem Globetrotters Final appearance of Alle Ghabdan and Dawson Connor
12	12	"The Cadigan-Scott Family"	Livermore, California	May 23, 2004	113
Diane Scott and Mark Cadigan both died within three weeks of each other, leaving their eight children to fend for themselves. The older siblings moved back to the house in Livermore, California to keep the family together, but the house is way too small for them. On top of all that, they all had to share one bathroom. (Note: First family to get a makeover outside of Southern California) Ty's secret room - Danny's rock-and-roll themed room Design team – Ty, Constance, Michael, Paul, Preston, Tracy
13	13	"The Imbriani Family"	San Bernardino, California	July 18, 2004	112
Brook Imbriani gave blood to a local blood drive, and then was told that a baby girl with leukemia was a match with her bone marrow. Nancy Ramirez, the baby’s mother, nominated the family for a home makeover. At the time, Brook was living in a house with her two kids, her mother, her sister, her brother-in-law, and her nephew. (Note: This was the first house to be completely demolished.) Ty's secret room - Pool cabana Design team – Ty, Constance, Paul, Preston, Tracy

== See also ==
- List of Extreme Makeover: Home Edition episodes
- Extreme Makeover: Home Edition Specials
