= Jeon Kyu-hwan =

South Korean film director and screenwriter

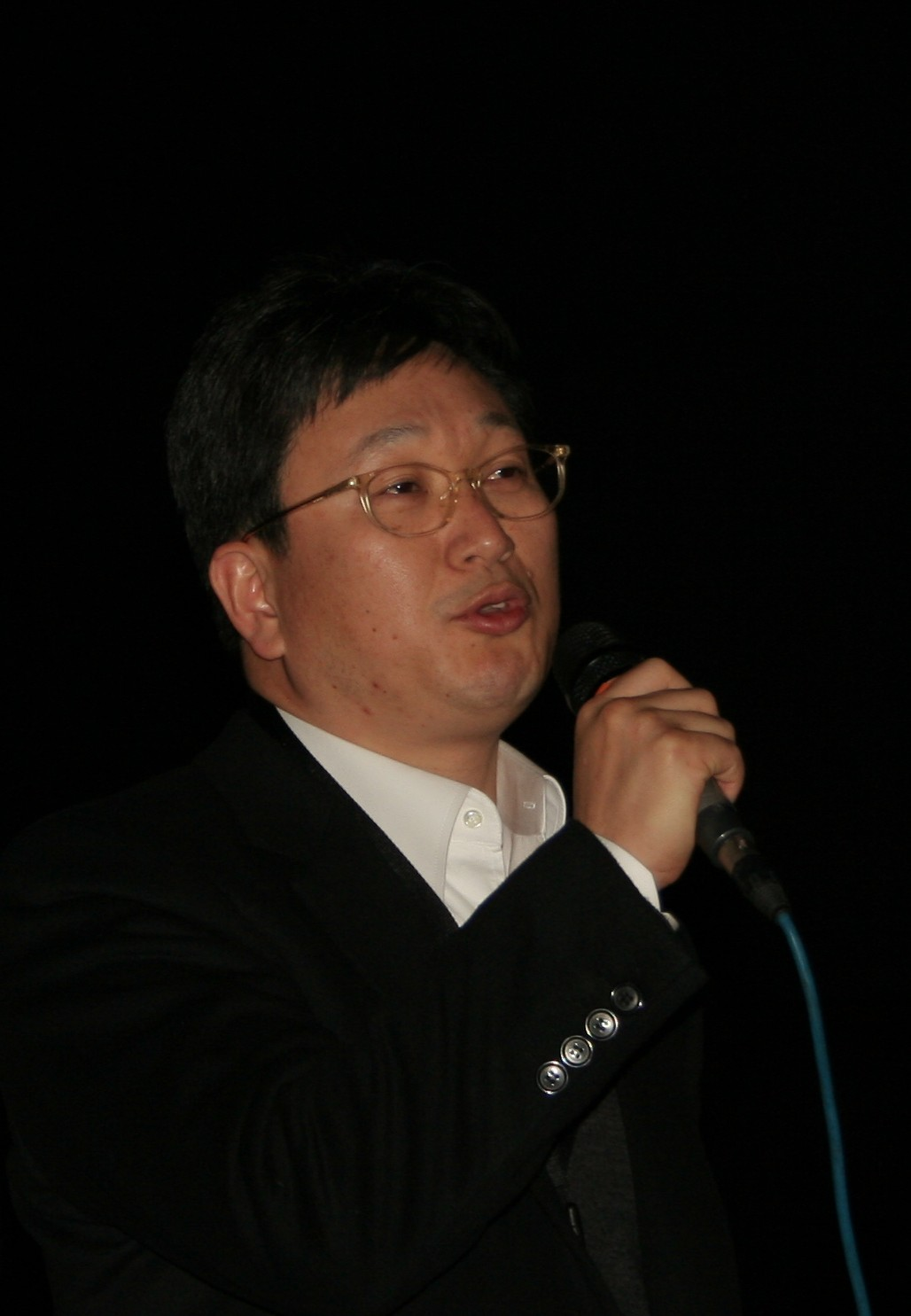
- Jeon in 2010
- Born: 1965 (age 60–61); South Korea
- Occupations: Film director screenwriter

Korean name
- Hangul: 전규환
- RR: Jeon Gyuhwan
- MR: Chŏn Kyuhwan

Jeon Kyu-hwan (Korean: 전규환, Korean pronunciation: [tɕʌnɡjuɸʷan]; born 1965) is a South Korean film director and screenwriter. Besides being the first Korean film to win the 2012 Queer Lion at the 69th Venice International Film Festival, The Weight (2012) also won various awards at film festivals, including Best Director at the 16th Tallinn Black Nights Film Festival and Silver Peacock Award for best director at the 43rd International Film Festival of India in 2012.

== Career ==
Jeon started his career in a talent management company as a manager for actors such as Cho Jae-hyun and Sul Kyung-gu, before making his directorial feature debut with Mozart Town (2008), followed by Animal Town (2009) and Dance Town (2010). These films formed the 'town trilogy' that shed light on the scars that city leaves on the people living in it and vice versa.

In From Seoul to Varanasi (2011), he experimented with melodrama genre and shot the film in India after being fascinated by the country when he was there to attend a film festival.

The Weight (2012), about a hunchback mortician and his transgender stepsister, won the 2012 Queer Lion, an award for the "best film with a homosexual and queer culture theme" at the 69th Venice International Film Festival. It is also the first Korean film to win the prize.

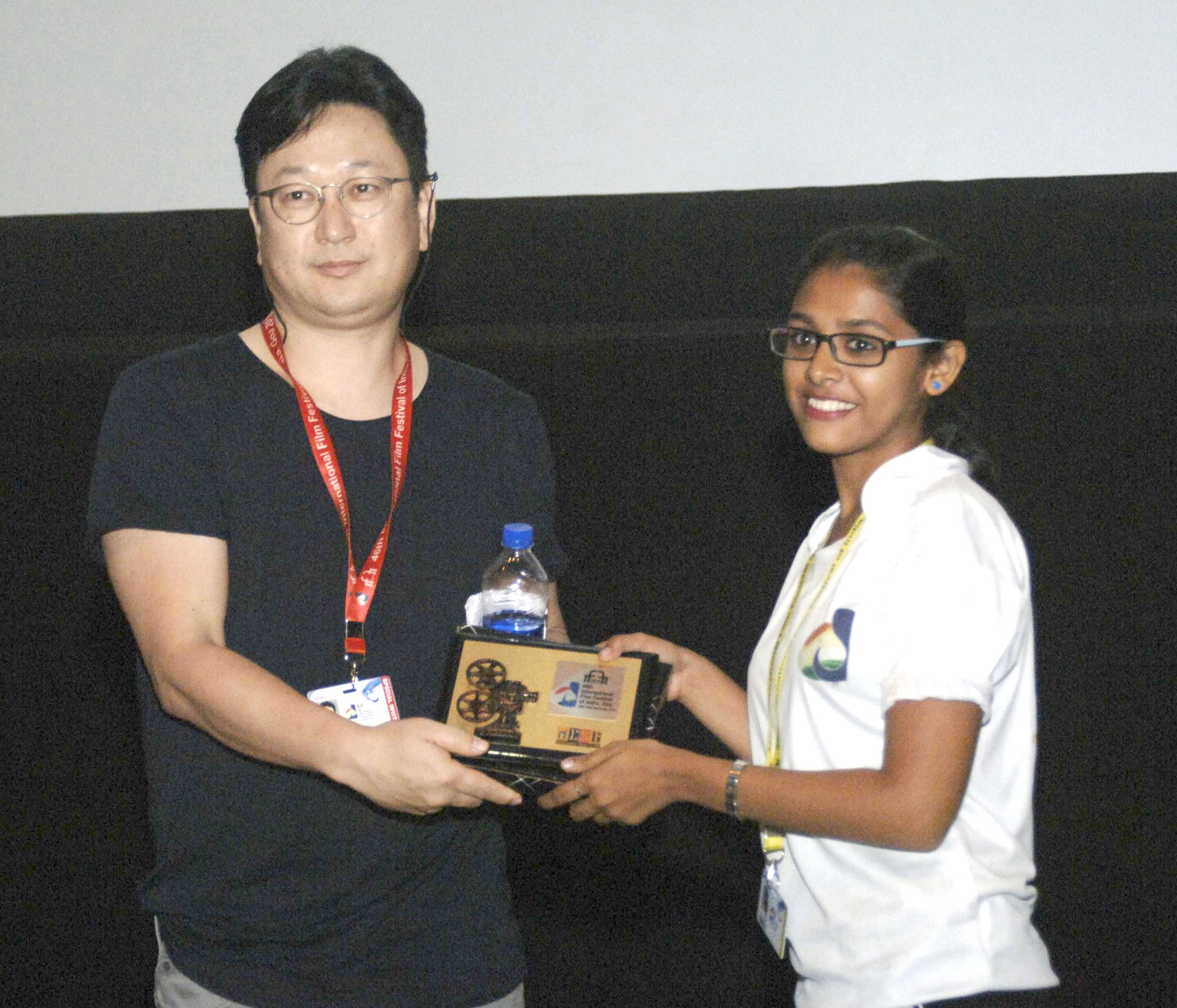
Kyu-hwan being felicitated at IFFI (2015)

== Filmography ==
- Mozart Town (2008)
- Animal Town (2009)
- Dance Town (2010)
- From Seoul to Varanasi (2011)
- 60 Seconds of Solitude in Year Zero (collection of one-minute shorts created by 60 filmmakers)
- The Weight (2012)
- My Boy (2013)
- Angry Painter (2015)
- Supsogui bubu (lit. 'A couple in the forest', 2017)

== Awards ==
- 2011 12th Busan Film Critics Awards: Special Jury Prize (Animal Town)
- 2012 16th Tallinn Black Nights Film Festival: Best Director (The Weight)
- 2012 43rd International Film Festival of India: Silver Peacock Award For Best Director (The Weight))
