= Queen of Montreuil =

- Film poster
- Directed by: Sólveig Anspach
- Written by: Sólveig Anspach; Jean-Luc Gaget
- Produced by: Patrick Sobelman
- Starring: Florence Loiret Caille
- Cinematography: Isabelle Razavet
- Edited by: Anne Riegel
- Music by: Martin Wheeler
- Production companies: Ex Nihilo; Mikros Image
- Distributed by: Diaphana Films
- Release dates: 7 July 2012 (Festival Paris Cinéma); 20 March 2013 (France)
- Running time: 87 minutes
- Country: France
- Languages: French; English; Icelandic

Queen of Montreuil is a 2012 French comedy-drama film directed by Sólveig Anspach and starring Florence Loiret Caille.

== Cast ==
- Florence Loiret Caille as Agathe
- Didda Jónsdóttir as Anna
- Úlfur Ægisson as Úlfur
- Éric Caruso as Caruso
- Samir Guesmi as Samir
- Alexandre Steiger as Alexandre
- François Tarot as Ludovic
- Anne Morin as Virginie
- Zakariya Gouram as Selim Loubna
- Bernard Bloch as The foreman
- Sophie Quinton as Laurent's mistress

== Accolades ==
The film won the Lina Mangiacapre Award at the 69th Venice International Film Festival and the Audience Award at the Reykjavík International Film Festival.
