= Terramatta =

- Directed by: Costanza Quatriglio
- Written by: Chiara Ottaviano
- Based on: Terra Matta by Vincenzo Rabito
- Produced by: Chiara Ottaviano
- Music by: Paolo Buonvino
- Distributed by: Cinecittà Luce
- Release date: September 6, 2012 (Venice)
- Running time: 74 minutes
- Country: Italy
- Language: Italian

Terramatta: The Italian Twentieth Century of Vincenzo Rabito Sicilian illiterate (Italian: Terramatta: Il Novecento italiano di Vincenzo Rabito analfabeta siciliano) is a 2012 documentary directed by Costanza Quatriglio, based on the memoir Terra Matta by Vincenzo Rabito. Winner of several awards, including the Nastro d'Argento 2013, it was shown in all major Italian cities.

== Plot ==
The film is centered around narration of excerpts from Vincenzo Rabito's memoir, Terra Matta. Rabito begins with his background in Sicily. He was born in 1899, and at a young age, he was pulled out of school to earn a wage for his family after the death of his father. As a teenager, he was drafted to fight in World War I. In some excerpts, he relates some of the atrocities he committed during the war, including assisting a friend in sexually torturing a young Italian woman. Following the war, Rabito worked in German mines until the beginning of World War II.

At the insistence of his mother, Rabito took a wife, with whom he had three children. The children are shown as fully grown men in present-day Italy, visiting their father's childhood home and relating their own memories of some events Rabito wrote about. Despite remaining distanced from his wife, Rabito took great pride in his children, particularly because they were all fully educated and literate. Rabito did not learn to write until he was an adult; the spelling in his memoir is largely based on phonetic transliterations of Sicilian language.

Although Rabito is telling his own story, he is scarcely shown in the film. Instead, his narration generally underscores footage of war, images of Sicilian villages and countrysides, and images of his journals.

== Production ==
Terramatta is narrated by Roberto Nobile, reading selections from the memoirs of Vincenzo Rabito. Rabito's three sons, Turi, Tano, and Giovanni also appear in the film.

Images in the film are taken from the Cinecittà Luce and other private archives, along with more recent footage of Chiaramonte Gulfi (provided by Rabito's three sons) and surrounding Sicilian countryside. Original pages from Rabito's diary, preserved in the National Diary Archive (Italian: Archivio Diaristico Nazionale) of Pieve Santo Stefano appear in the film.

== Release ==
The film premiered at the Venice Film Festival on 6 September 2012.
