= Costanza Quatriglio =

Italian film director (born 1973)

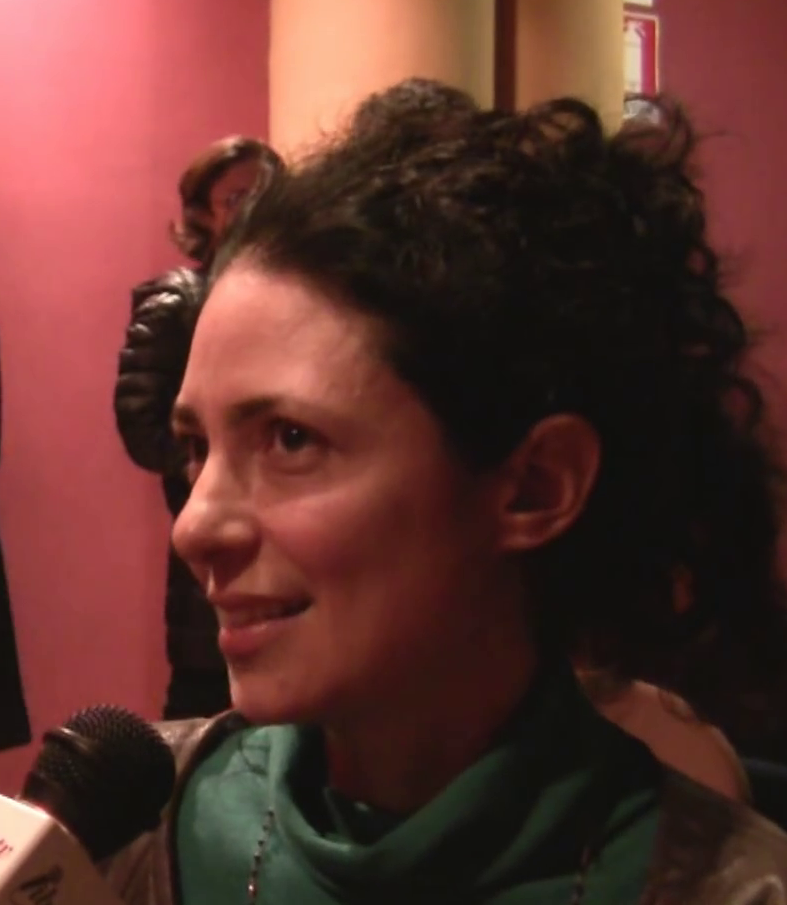
- Born: 6 January 1973 (age 53); Palermo, Italy
- Occupation: Film director

Costanza Quatriglio (born 6 January 1973) is an Italian film director, documentarist and screenwriter.

== Life and career ==
Born in Palermo, Quatriglio got a degree in law at the Palermo University and later enrolled at the Centro Sperimentale di Cinematografia, graduating in direction. After directing some shorts and documentaries, she made her feature film debut with The Island, which premiered at the 2003 Cannes Film Festival in the Directors' Fortnight section.

Her 2012 documentary film Terramatta premiered at the 69th Venice International Film Festival and was awarded a Nastro d'Argento for best documentary film. Her 2013 short film Con il fiato sospeso won the Gillo Pontecorvo Award at the 70th Venice International Film Festival. Her documentary My Human Heart was screened as Special Event at the 2009 Locarno Film Festival. In 2015, she won a second Nastro d'Argento for best documentary film with Triangle. Her 2024 documentary film The Secret Drawer was screened in the Forum section at the 74th Berlin International Film Festival.

== Selected filmography ==
- The Island (L'isola, 2003)
- Racconti per L'isola (2003)
- Il mondo addosso (2006)
- Art. 11, segment of the film All Human Rights for All (2008)
- My Human Heart (Il mio cuore umano, 2009)
- Terramatta (2012)
- Triangle (2014)
- Girotondo, segment of the film 9x10 novanta (2014)
- 87 ore (2015)
- Sembra mio figlio (2018)
- Palermo sospesa (2020)
- Trafficante di virus (2021)
- The Secret Drawer (Il cassetto segreto, 2024)
