= The Weight (2012 film) =

- Hangul: 무게
- RR: Muge
- MR: Muge
- Directed by: Jeon Kyu-hwan
- Written by: Jeon Kyu-hwan
- Produced by: Kim Woo-taek; Choi Min-ae
- Starring: Cho Jae-hyun; Park Ji-a
- Cinematography: Kim Nam-gyun
- Edited by: Kim Mi-yeong; Park Hae-oh
- Music by: Ju Dae-gwan
- Distributed by: Next Entertainment World
- Release dates: September 7, 2012 (Venice International Film Festival); November 7, 2013 (South Korea)
- Running time: 108 minutes
- Country: South Korea
- Language: Korean

The Weight (Korean: 무게; RR: Muge) is a 2012 South Korean film about a hunchback mortician and his transgender stepsister.

It made its world premiere in the Venice Days sidebar of the 69th Venice International Film Festival, where it won the 2012 Queer Lion, an award for the "best film with a homosexual and queer culture theme." It is the first Korean film to have won the prize. It also won a Special Award at the 2013 Fantasporto Orient Express Awards. Jeon Kyu-hwan was awarded Best Director at the 16th Tallinn Black Nights Film Festival, and the Silver Peacock award for best director at the International Film Festival of India. Cho Jae-hyun won Best Actor at the 2013 Fantasia Festival.

Most of director Jeon Kyu-hwan's previous films, including Berlinale-featured Varanasi and Dance Town, have dealt with the underbelly of society. The Weight is his fifth feature-length film.

== Plot ==
Jung is the last living mortician at the morgue who has to rely on medicine for his tuberculosis and arthritis. Despite his illness, cleansing and dressing the dead is work he considers to be noble and beautiful.

Born with a hunchback and left at an orphanage, Jung was adopted by a woman who hid him away in the attic only to use him as a child slave for her dress shop. The woman's own child Dong-bae is younger than Jung; she has always wanted to become a woman, loathing her own male body. While Jung feels affection and sympathy for his younger stepsister, he feels burdened by Dong-bae's struggles. Under the weight of life and death carried by the dead bodies that he faces each day coupled with his love-hate relationship with Dong-bae, Jung endures the pain and thirst that he feels like a camel crossing a desolate desert in silence. Then he quietly prepares his biggest, his last gift for his sister.

== Cast ==
- Cho Jae-hyun as Mr. Jung / Han Hae-woon
- Park Ji-a as Dong-bae
- Lee Jun-hyeok as man in motorcycle helmet
- Ra Mi-ran
- Ahn Ji-hye
- Oh Seong-tae
- Kim Sung-min (cameo)
- Yoon Dong-hwan (cameo)
- Darcy Paquet as minister (cameo)
- Kim Young-hoon
