= The Golden Temple (film) =

2012 documentary film

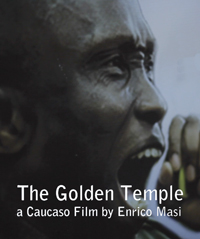
- Directed by: Enrico Masi
- Screenplay by: Enrico Masi, Stefano Migliore
- Starring: Mike Wells; Iain Sinclair; Sue Jackson; John Toland
- Cinematography: Giuliana Fantoni, Alberto Gemmi
- Edited by: Jonathan Morris
- Music by: Zende Music
- Production company: Caucaso Factory
- Distributed by: ESNA European Higher Education News
- Release date: 31 August 2012 (Venice)
- Running time: 70 minutes
- Countries: United Kingdom; France; Italy
- Language: English

The Golden Temple is a 2012 documentary film directed by Enrico Masi and set in East London during preparations for the 2012 Olympic Games. Using first-hand testimonies of people living in the area at the time, the film documents the changes in the lives of these people in relation to the urban regeneration promised by the large-scale sporting event.

The film premiered at the 69th edition of the Venice Film Festival.

== Plot ==
In the years leading up to the 2012 Olympics, East London, the eventual site of the Olympic park, is transformed into a construction site. Indeed, one of the factors that was instrumental in leading the Olympic committee to choose London as the location for the 2012 games was the promise to reinvigorate this area, which was considered to be one of the poorest in Great Britain.

The film shows the mood of the area at the time to be one of hope and expectation, by interviewing inhabitants and workers in order to explore the urban and social changes brought about by the imminent arrival of the great sporting event. The theme of the clash between large-scale events and the daily lives of ordinary people is explored through the use of symbolism: three 'temples' are examined – hence the title of the film, 'The Golden Temple.' First we see the stadium, a veritable temple of games and entertainment: we hear in one witness's account, however, that it was built over radioactive waste. The second symbolic temple – this time, a shrine to consumerism – is Westfield Stratford City, one of the biggest shopping centres in Europe. It was constructed in such a way that all Olympic spectators had to pass through it to reach the stadium. The third symbolic temple is not, unlike the others, a real construction, but is instead represented by numerous religious communities in the area seeking new followers, and more specifically by the plans to build a new mosque in the area at around the same time, which were eventually scrapped.

Among these metaphorical temples, we meet various people who talk of their hopes and eventual delusions regarding the regeneration of the area. Among them are Mike, a photo journalist who lives on a house boat on the canal; John, a businessman; Sue, one of the Olympic Games tourist guides; and the apostle Ben, so-called 'General of God,’ a Ghanaian evangelist who preaches in a military uniform. The English author Iain Sinclair also appears in the film. He criticises the militarisation of the city of London under the pretext of the Olympic Games, an argument which he explores further in his book 'Ghost Milk.'

== Production ==
The film was produced by Caucaso Factory, in collaboration with Aplysia, Dupleix and Nordeste. The media consultancy, distribution and presentation of the film was undertaken by ESNA European Higher Education News, based in Berlin.
