= Tokyo Tribe (film) =

- Film poster
- トウキョウ トライブ
- Directed by: Sion Sono
- Written by: Sion Sono
- Based on: Tokyo Tribes by Santa Inoue
- Produced by: Yoshinori Chiba; Nobuhiro Iizuka; Naoko Komuro; Shin'ichirō Masuda; Ayako Oguchi; Kinya Oguchi; Tadashi Tanaka; Keizō Yuri
- Starring: Ryōhei Suzuki; Riki Takeuchi; Young Dais
- Cinematography: Daisuke Sōma
- Edited by: Jun'ichi Itō
- Music by: B.C.D.M.G.
- Production companies: Django Film; From First Production Co. Nikkatsu
- Distributed by: Nikkatsu
- Release date: August 30, 2014; (Japan)
- Running time: 116 minutes
- Country: Japan
- Language: Japanese

Tokyo Tribe (トウキョウ トライブ) is a 2014 Japanese live-action musical crime comedy film based on Santa Inoue's Tokyo Tribes manga series. It was directed by Sion Sono and was released in Japan on August 30, 2014.

== Plot ==
The film is set in an alternate Japan where street gangs collectively known as the Tokyo Tribes control their respective territories and are in continuous conflict. Mera, the head of the Wu-Ronz tribe of Bukuro, joins forces with the violent and sadistic gangster Buppa of Buppa Town with the intent of initiating a gang war between the Wu-Ronz and the Musashino Saru tribes. When it comes to a confrontation between the two tribes, Mera attempts to kill Kai, a popular member of the Musashino Saru tribe. During the attempt Mera accidentally kills Kai's friend Tera, another member of the Musashino Saru tribe who has been beloved by members of all Tribes since before their formation. This causes all of the other Tokyo Tribes to join forces against Mera and Buppa's forces, leading to an all-out gang war.

Tokyo Tribe mirrors apocalyptic art house violence, horror musical and tribalistic themes from films such as Mad Max, Do the Right Thing, Rocky Horror Picture Show and various Tarantino films. The film is almost entirely scripted in old-school hip-hop rhyme.

== Cast ==
- Ryōhei Suzuki as Mera
- Riki Takeuchi as Buppa
- Young Dais as Kai Deguchi
- Nana Seino as Sunmi/Erika
- Shunsuke Daitō as Iwao
- Takuya Ishida as Kim
- Yui Ichikawa as Nori-chan
- Bernard Ackah as Jadakins
- Joey Beni as Kamekachi
- Arata Matsuura as Skunk
- Yuku Ishii as Hasheem
- Makato Sakaguchi as Yon
- Kokone Sasaki as rookie police officer
- Hideo Nakano as veteran police officer
- Hisako Ōkata as DJ
- Akira Yamamoto
- Akio Joe
- Yoshiyuki Yamaguchi as Chikatilo
- Akihiro Kitamura as Mukade
- Yoshihiro Takayama as Bouncer
- Motoki Fukami
- Hitomi Katayama as Yoko
- Hiroki Yahiki
- Haruna Yabuki
- Cyborg Kaori as Beatboxing maidservant
- Mao Mita
- Miyuki Yokoyama
- Shintaro Hazama
- Hirokazu Tategata
- Yuki Izumisawa
- Stephanie
- Santa Inoue as Lotus Chief
- Mika Kanō as Erendia
- Shōko Nakagawa as Kesha
- Kunihiko Kawakami as MC Kan
- Mega-G as Mega-G
- D.O.
- Neri-Motha Fuckerz
- Ego
- Simon
- Ys
- KOHH
- Tokage
- Young Hastle
- Loota
- Vito Foccacio
- DJ Ken Watanabe
- Vikn
- Mary Jane
- Anarchy
- Jesse
- Denden as Daishisai
- Aki Hiraoka as Nezumi
- Jōi Iwanaga
- Tomoko Karina
- Yōsuke Kubozuka as Nkoi
- Pacmna as Large Diner
- Ryūta Satō as Tera
- Shōta Sometani as MC Show
- Takeshi James Yamada

== Box office ==
The film earned ¥144.3 million at the Japanese box office by September 14, 2014.

== Reception ==
Mike Hale of The New York Times called the film "an eccentric project" even for Sion Sono and found that the biggest problem was the "screenplay by Mr. Sono that doesn't provide much motivation for all the insults, battles and chases (and casual mistreatment of women)".
Martin Tsai of the Los Angeles Times gave the film a negative review, criticizing its "uninspired violence and misogyny" and found that "the film suggests that these mobsters are driven to conquer only to overcompensate for the inadequacy of their manhoods".
Dennis Harvey of Variety.com also criticized the music, writing that the "soundtrack's mostly generic old-school beats support lyrics by a host of Japanese performers (many of whom have roles here) that are often funny — sometimes inadvertently, but mostly in a deliberately crass, obscene-boasting way" and that "delivery ranges from the decent to the dreadful".
