= Hitomi Katayama =

Japanese actress (born 1980)

- Born: September 22, 1980 (age 45); Fukuoka, Japan
- Occupation: Actress

Hitomi Katayama (片山 瞳, Hitomi Katayama; born September 22, 1980 in Fukuoka) is a Japanese actress.

== Career ==
Katayama started her career as a fashion model in Paris, Milano, New York, Los Angeles and Tokyo. In 2007, Katayama was chosen to star in Osamu Minorikawa’s film, Life Can Be So Wonderful. In 2008, she was a regular on TV drama series Ashita no Kita Yoshio on Fuji TV. In 2012, Katayama starred as the heroine in Koji Wakamatsu’s Petrel Hotel Blue (which had a special showing at the Busan Film Festival), and in 2013, again in Koji Wakamatsu's film The Millennial Rapture (featured at the Venice Film Festival). In 2014, she appeared in Takashi Miike's Over Your Dead Body and Sion Sono's Tokyo Tribe.

== Filmography ==
=== Film ===
- Life Can Be So Wonderful (2007)
- Karakuri (2010)
- The Third (2010)
- Mahoroba (2011)
- Black Hair (2011)
- Ringing in their ears (2011)
- Sukiyaki (2011)
- The Detective is in the Bar (2011)
- Petrel Hotel Blue (2012)
- The Millennial Rapture (2012)
- Over Your Dead Body (2014)
- Tokyo Tribe (2014)

=== Television ===
- Ashita no Kita Yoshio TV Drama Series regular by Fuji TV (2008)
- No One Can Protect You TV Drama by Fuji TV (2009)
- Douki by WOWOW (2011)

=== Commercial ===
- UNIQLO
- KIRIN
- TOYOTA

=== Music video ===
- Jazz NEKO “Confusion The Live”
- Aloha “China Town”, Lead
- BOOM BOOM satellites “Lock me out”, Lead
- Kirinji “Pray, Don't curse”
- J. Williams “Never Let Go”, Lead

== Modeling ==
- Chanel
- Fendi
- Armani
- Hugo boss
- John Galliano
- VALENTINO
- Paul KA
- Y's
- Rolex
- Panasonic
- Shiseido
- Wella
- VANS
- Levi's
- DIESEL
