= The Little Room =

2010 film

- Directed by: Stéphanie Chuat; Véronique Reymond
- Written by: Stéphanie Chuat; Véronique Reymond
- Produced by: Ruth Waldburger; Nicolas Steil
- Starring: Michel Bouquet; Florence Loiret Caille; Eric Caravaca; Joël Delsaut
- Cinematography: Pierre Milon
- Edited by: Thierry Faber; Marie-Hélène Dozo
- Music by: Emre Sevindik
- Release date: August 2010
- Running time: 87 minutes
- Countries: Switzerland; Luxembourg
- Language: French

The Little Room (French: La petite chambre) is a 2010 Swiss-Luxembourg drama film directed by Stéphanie Chuat and Véronique Reymond, about the relationship between an elderly man and his home carer. It won the Swiss Film Awards for Best Fiction Film and Best Screenplay in 2011, and was selected as Switzerland’s submission for the Academy Award for Best Foreign Language Film at the 83rd Academy Awards.

== Synopsis ==
Edmond, an elderly man with a weak heart, is determined to preserve his independence. He refuses both a move to a retirement home and help from the home carer Rose. Rose continues to stand up to him. When Edmond suffers a serious fall, he is forced to accept her assistance.

== Cast ==
The cast includes:

- Michel Bouquet as Edmond
- Florence Loiret Caille as Rose
- Eric Caravaca as Marc
- Joël Delsaut as Jacques
- Valérie Bodson as Bettina
- Fabienne Barraud as Madame Gauthier
- Frédéric Landenberg as Gabriel
- Antonio Buíl as Miguel

== Reception ==
=== Awards and nominations ===
The film's awards included the Swiss Film Award “Quartz” for Best Fiction Film and Best Screenplay in 2011, the Zürcher Filmpreis in 2011, and the Ecumenical Jury Prize for Best Feature Film at the 2011 Kyiv International Film Festival Molodist.

The film was selected as Switzerland’s submission for the Academy Award for Best Foreign Language Film at the 83rd Academy Awards, but did not make the final shortlist.

=== Critical response ===
On Rotten Tomatoes, the film holds an approval rating of 83% based on six reviews. Metacritic assigned it a weighted average score of 69 out of 100 based on four critics, indicating “generally favourable reviews”.

Filmbulletin wrote that the film largely avoids melodramatic excess, instead treating life and death with restraint. It also praised Michel Bouquet’s minimalist performance as Edmond. Filmo described the film as emotionally powerful and sensitive, and as a “wonderful hymn to life”. SRF described the film as “as moving as it is witty” and praised Michel Bouquet’s performance as Edmond.

== Festival screenings ==
The film's festival screenings included the 63rd Locarno Film Festival and the 34th Montreal World Film Festival in 2010, followed by the 22nd Palm Springs International Film Festival, the 41st Kyiv International Film Festival Molodist, and the 8th Sevilla Festival de Cine Europeo in 2011.

== See also ==
- List of submissions to the 83rd Academy Awards for Best Foreign Language Film
- List of Swiss submissions for the Academy Award for Best Foreign Language Film
