= Florence Loiret Caille =

French actress (born 1975)

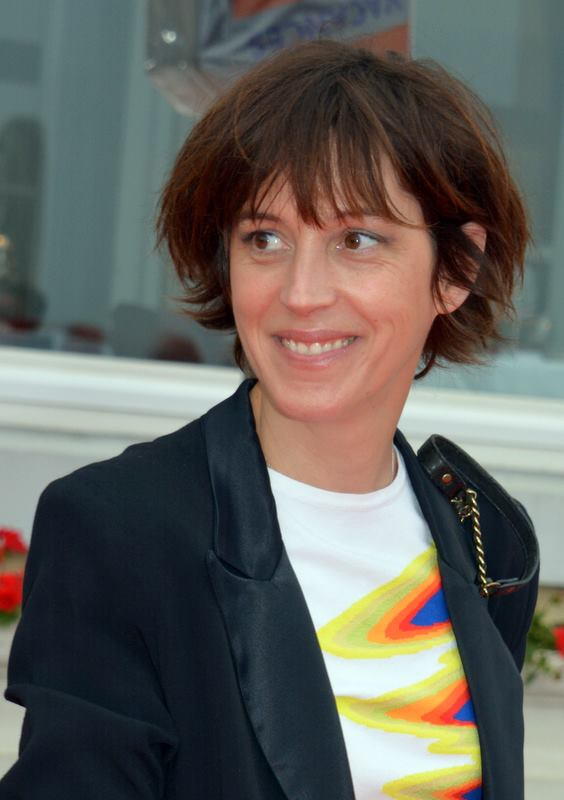
- Born: 26 June 1975 (age 51); Paris, France
- Occupation: Actress
- Years active: 1996–present

Florence Loiret Caille (born 26 June 1975) is a French actress. She has appeared in more than sixty films since 1996.

== Filmography ==
Year	Film	Role	Other notes
1996	Portraits chinois	Emmanuelle	(billed as Florence Loiret)
1997	Seule		(Short)
1997	Elles	Rita	(billed as Florence Loiret)
1997	Seventh Heaven	Chloé	(billed as Florence Loiret)
1999	Stop	Julie	(Short) (billed as Florence Loiret)
1999	Ô trouble		(Short) (billed as Florence Loiret)
2000	The Mechanics of Women		
2000	Code Unknown	Amadou's Friend	(billed as Florence Loiret)
2001	Final Exams	Gaelle	(Short) (billed as Florence Loiret)
2001	Courts mais Gay: Tome 1		(billed as Florence Loiret) (segment "Ô trouble")
2001	Love Bandits	Hélène	(billed as Florence Loiret)
2001	Trouble Every Day	Christelle	
2002	Vendredi Soir	La jeune fille du flipper	
2002	Le chignon d'Olga	Emma	
2002	Higher Still	Juliette 2	(billed as Florence Loiret)
2002	Courts mais Gay: Tome 3	Gaelle	(segment "Les résultats du bac") (billed as Florence Loiret)
2002	We Need a Vacation		
2003	La petite chambre		(Short)
2003	That Woman	Femme piscine	
2003	Time of the Wolf	Nathalie Azoulay	
2004	(Mon) Jour de chance	La fille sur le toit	(Short)
2004	Boomerang	Jeanne	(Short)
2004	L'ennemi naturel	Nathalie	
2004	Victoire	Ludivine	
2004	The Intruder	Antoinette	
2005	Petite faiblesse	Marion	(Short) (billed as Florence Loiret)
2005	Courts mais GAY: Tome 10	Marion (segment "Petite faiblesse")	(billed as Florence Loiret)
2005	Une aventure	Cécile	
2005	To Paint or Make Love	Élise	
2006	Nationale	Clémence	(Short) (billed as Florence Loiret)
2007	Les deux mondes	Omi	
2007	Le haori de soie mauve	Ana	(Short) (billed as Florence Loiret)
2007	L'homme qui marche	Edwige	
2007	Waiting for Someone	Sabine	(billed as Florence Loiret)
2008	Let's Talk About the Rain	Aurélie	
2008	The Easy Way	Nathalie Goumard	
2008	The dead hear not the bells		(Short)
2009	The Queen of Clubs	Argine	
2009	A Real Life	Isabelle	
2009	Someone I Loved	Chloé	aka Je l'aimais
2010	The Little Room	Rose	aka La petite chambre
2010	La passerelle	Géraldine	(Short)
2010	Monsieur l'abbé		(Short)
2011	Sylvain Rivière		(Short)
2011	Un mauvais père	Adèle Legendre	(Short)
2011	Last Winter	Marie	
2011	The Day I Saw Your Heart	Dom Dhrey	
2012	The Little King	Nathalie	
2012	Queen of Montreuil	Agathe	
2013	Les filles de la Côte d'Azur	Florence	(Short)
2013	Bastards	Elysée	
2014	The Clearstream Affair	Géraldine Robert	aka L'Enquête
2014	Un petit d'homme	La mère	(Short)
2016	The Aquatic Effect	Agathe	
2018	Private Eye	Détective	(Short)
2019	L'appel du large	Valerie	(pre-production)
2026	Women on Trial (L'Affaire Marie-Claire)	Micheline Bambruck	
Year	Television series	Role	Other notes
1999	Vacances volées	Lise	(TV movie) (billed as Florence Loiret)
1999	Le portrait	Anaïs	(TV movie) (billed as Florence Loiret)
2000	Paris-Deauville	Béa	(TV movie) (billed as Florence Loiret)
2000	A Wonderful Family	Agnès	TV series, 2 episodes, (billed as Florence Loiret)
2001	Sa mère, la pute	Coralie	(TV movie) (billed as Florence Loiret)
2001	Maman à 16 ans	Julia	(TV movie) (billed as Florence Loiret)
2002	Laura's Paradise		(TV movie) (billed as Florence Loiret)
2003	Un goût de sel	La femme en panne	(TV movie)
2004	Lumière		(TV movie) (billed as Florence Loiret)
2005	Spiral	Ghislaine Androux	TV series, 3 episodes
2005	SoeurThérèse.com	Marianne Rivière	TV series, 1 episode
2007	Le juge est une femme	Maya	TV series, 1 episode
2011	Rituels meurtriers	Clara Valère	(TV movie)
2014	Pilules bleues	Laura	(TV movie)
2015	Defendant	Violette	TV series, 1 episode
2015-2018	Le Bureau des Légendes	Marie-Jeanne Duthilleul	TV series, 39 episodes
2016	La main du mal	Hélène Morice	TV series, 2 episodes
2018	Cassandre	Isabelle Cantin	TV series, 1 episode
