= Tokyo Tribes =

Japanese media franchise by Santa Inoue

トウキョウ トライブ トゥー (Tōkyō Toraibu Tū)
- Manga

Tokyo Tribe
- Written by: Santa Inoue
- Published by: JICC Shuppankyoku; Bijutsu Shuppansha; Shueisha
- Published: April 1993
- Volumes: 1
- Manga
- Written by: Santa Inoue
- Published by: Shōdensha
- English publisher: AUS: Madman Entertainment; NA: Tokyopop
- Imprint: Shōdensha Comics
- Magazine: Boon
- Original run: 1997 – 2005
- Volumes: 12
- Anime television series
- Directed by: Tatsuo Satō; Mitsuyuki Masuhara (assistant); Takuji Endō (assistant)
- Written by: Tatsuo Satō
- Music by: MURO; Takeshi Yanagawa
- Studio: Madhouse
- Original network: WOWOW
- Original run: November 11, 2006 – February 17, 2007
- Episodes: 13
- Manga

Tokyo Tribe 2: Spin Off!
- Written by: Santa Inoue
- Published by: Shōdensha
- Magazine: Various
- Published: March 22, 2008
- Volumes: 1
- Live-action film

Tokyo Tribe
- Directed by: Sion Sono
- Produced by: From First Production; Nikkatsu
- Written by: Sion Sono
- Music by: BCDMG
- Studio: Nikkatsu
- Released: August 30, 2014
- Runtime: 116 minutes
- icon

Tokyo Tribes, known in Japanese as Tokyo Tribe-2 (トウキョウ トライブ トゥー, Tōkyō Toraibu Tū), is a Japanese seinen manga series written and illustrated by Santa Inoue. A previous series titled Tokyo Tribe (トウキョウ トライブ, Tōkyō Toraibu) was published into a single-volume in 1993. Tokyo Tribes was originally serialized from 1997 to 2005 in the urban fashion magazine boon. It is a continuation of the plot in Tokyo Tribe, although many of the characters from that story do not appear in this series. A live-action film adaptation directed by Sion Sono was released in Japan on August 30, 2014.

== Plot ==
Five years after the Shibuya riots, the Tribes of Tokyo have been enjoying a period of relative peace, until Kim and two other members of the Musashino Saru intrude on the territory of the Wu-Ronz in Bukuro. Mera, the leader of Wu-Ronz kills the three Saru, under the assumption that they were members of the Shibuya Saru.

Two days later, after searching for who killed his friends, Musashino Saru member Kai runs into Mera. Old friends in their high school days, the two get into a confrontation that ends up leaving Tera, the leader of Musashino Saru, dead and setting the stage for violence between the Tribes.

== Characters ==
Kai Deguchi (出口 海, Deguchi Kai)
Voiced by: Daisuke Namikawa (Japanese); Emmanuel Garijo (French)
A DJ and a member of Musashino Saru.
Big Daddy (ビッグ・仏波, Biggu Buppa)
Voiced by: Daisuke Gōri (Japanese); Benoît Allemane (French)
The leader of the Buppa clan and the main antagonist of the series, Buppa is shown as a big, ugly, morbidly obese, bisexual Yakuza crime lord with a lecherous, sadistic personality.

=== Manga-only Characters ===
- Nagisa – The main protagonist and a member of the Shivuya (an alteration of "Shibuya") Saru gang.
- Megane (Specs) – Nagisa's friend and a member of Shivuya Saru.
- Totoro – Nagisa's friend and a member of Shivuya Saru.
- Otogiri – Shivuya Saru member who lives in Shivuya Mansion. The Saru are often seen at his apartment.
- Fujio – Nagisa's girlfriend.
- Iwao – The leader of Saru's rival gang, the Shinjuku (written in katakana differently than the actual place) Hands.
- Yama-Chan – Shivuya Saru member who is attacked by the Hands in Shinjuku.

== Media ==
=== Anime ===
- Opening Theme: Top of Tokyo, by Illmatic Buddha MC's
- Ending Theme: TT2 Owari no Uta, by Scha Dara Parr

The show was originally planned as a movie which would have been distributed by MTV.

=== Film ===
A live action film adaptation directed by Sion Sono was released in Japan on August 30, 2014.

== Legacy ==
The series has gained notoriety for a scene in which a man is anally raped to death, which has come to be known as "Goosh Goosh" and is used as a shock video.
