= Extreme Makeover: Home Edition season 2 =

Extreme Makeover: Home Edition
- Season 2
- No. of episodes: 24

Release
- Original network: ABC
- Original release: September 26, 2004 – May 22, 2005

Season chronology
- ← Previous; Season 1 Next → Season 3

This is a list of season 2 episodes of the Extreme Makeover: Home Edition series.

== Episodes ==
No. overall	No. in season	Title	Location	Original release date	Prod. code
15	1	"The Wofford Family"	Encinitas, California	September 26, 2004	202
Brian Wofford is a single father of eight, whose wife had died four years earlier. The kids were all crammed into two bedrooms with the four boys out in the garage. The Makeover team completely demolished the old house and built a brand new house, including a large workout room for the family. (Note: This episode is 2 hours long) Ty's secret room – Luke's do-it-yourself bedroom Design team – Ty, Constance, Michael, Paul, Preston, Tracy
16	2	"The Garay Family"	South Los Angeles, California	October 3, 2004	201
Veronica and Johnny Garay have four children of their own, with five bonus children including a son who is autistic. Three years before the makeover, Johnny's mother was killed by a gang member's stray bullet while visiting her son. He and Veronica chose to take care of the five younger brothers and sisters. They lived in a 100-year-old house which was previously built in 1904, was falling down, and had only one working bathroom. The team builds them a three-story house, with the help of some very special workers. This had been designed by the award-winning Bassenian/Lagoni Architects of Newport Beach, California. Ty's secret room – The third floor music and study area Design team – Ty, Constance, Michael, Paul, Preston, Tracy Special guest – Ericka Dunlap
17	3	"The Pope Family"	Penngrove, California	October 10, 2004	204
Shelby Pope suffers from Polymorphous light eruption (PMLE), more commonly known as being "allergic to the sun" — direct exposure can cause severe sun poisoning. She is practically a prisoner in her room because the house has so many large windows. The design team builds a new house with UV protected windows and a large backyard covered by large tents, so Shelby can enjoy the outdoors. The design team used the large farm to install huge solar panels which helped to practically eliminate the family's energy costs. Ty's secret room – An old barn, which Ty turns into an entertainment room/wine cooler Design team – Ty, Constance, Paige, Paul, Preston, Tracy
18	4	"The Grinnan Family"	Redlands, California	October 17, 2004	204
Hannah Grinnan was born with a congenital heart defect and needed a heart transplant. When Hannah started to reject the heart, the family moved from Arizona to California to be able to provide her with the best medical care. As part of the makeover, the design team installed an air purification system to try to eliminate the risk of mold and germs affecting Hannah's health. For the oldest son and his fiancée, the team built a mini apartment as part of the house, and they also gave a Ford F-250 to the father and a Ford Mustang for the oldest daughter. Ty's secret room – Hannah's bedroom Design team – Ty, Constance, Michael, Paul, Preston, Tracy Special guest – Lee Ann Womack
19	5	"The Mackey Family"	Granada Hills, California	October 24, 2004	207
Consuella Mackey runs Operation Confidence, a foundation to help people with disabilities get the help that they need and improve their own view of themselves. Consuella's sister and daughter live with her, in addition to a niece and another teenage male relative. Consuella often gives up her own bed for someone that may need a place to stay. The design team completely remodeled the house, including making it more handicap accessible, built a small beauty parlor, and fixed Consuella's old pickup truck. Ty's secret room – The new Operation Confidence office Design team – Ty, Constance, Michael, Paige, Paul, Tracy
20	6	"The Ali Family"	Queens, New York	October 31, 2004	206
Lucy Ali and her two adopted sons, Paul Evans Ali and Kuran Perry Ali, were forced out of their house after a contractor took their money and destroyed their house. Lucy currently pays rent on an apartment in addition to paying her mortgage. The design team completely remodeled their house. (Note: "How'd They Do That" episode aired on Monday) (Note: First family to get a makeover outside of California, and also the first makeover in the East Coast) Ty's secret project – Lucy's master bedroom suite. This would be the first master bedroom to be a secret project. Design team – Ty, Constance, Michael, Paige, Paul, Preston
21	7	"The Vardon Family"	Oak Park, Michigan	November 7, 2004	205
Judy and Larry Vardon are childhood sweethearts, who have been married for 20 years. They have two sons; 12 year old Lance, who is blind and autistic and 14 year old Stefan, their caretaker. Judy and Larry have been deaf since birth. The design team remodeled the house and put in a bunch of safety features to help take care of Lance. (Note: First family to get a makeover in the Midwest) Ty's secret room – Lance's play room Design team – Ty, Constance, Michael, Paul, Preston, Tracy Special guest – Marlee Matlin
22	8	"The Elcano Family"	Bakersfield, California	November 21, 2004	209
Jennifer Elcano lost her husband, Glen, in an auto accident. It left her to raise their two young children and run their family farm. The design team ripped down the old house, built a new house shaped like a barn, built a new barn, and helped plant the fields. The design team also gave the family a new Ford F250 pickup truck and a Ford Freestyle. Ty's secret room – GlenJen Farm Office; Design team – Ty, Constance, Paul, Preston, Tracy Special guest – Randy Travis
23	9	"The Burns Family"	Garden Grove, California	November 28, 2004	208
Benjamin Burns was born with osteogenesis imperfecta, also known as "brittle bone disease". The design team worked on building a home that was easier and safer for Benjamin, including more padding on the floors and the walls, non-slip flooring, and grab rails throughout the house. The tile and floor layers quit during the night of day 3 of this build because they didn't believe it was important enough, as told by their boss. Ty's secret room – Pamela's sewing themed bedroom Design team – Ty, Michael Paul, Preston, Tracy Special guest – Mr. T
24	10	"The Broadbent Family"	Las Vegas, Nevada	December 12, 2004	210
Patricia Broadbent is a former social worker who has adopted three girls with HIV. Recently diagnosed with lung cancer, she's worried about having a secure place for the girls to live if anything were to happen to her. Ty's secret room – Patricia's master bedroom Design team – Ty, Constance, Michael Paul, Preston Special guests – Elton John, Michael Buffer
25	11	"The Dore Family"	Kingston, Washington	January 9, 2005	211
Roseanne Dore, a single mother, raises her three daughters in Kingston, Washington. In March 2004, their house burned down and the insurance policy that Roseanne thought she had didn't exist. (Apparently their insurance agent retired on them without notifying them and the policy lapsed without their knowledge.) The family moved into a shed with no plumbing or electricity. (Note: First family to get a makeover in the Pacific Northwest) Ty's secret room – A new bed and breakfast Design team – Ty, Ed, Michael, Paige, Preston This is the only episode of Extreme Makeover: Home Edition did not have a traditional bus, instead the firetruck from Kitsap County Fire Department took its place and Ty said, "Men, Move That Firetruck!" First appearance of Ed Sanders
26	12	"The Anderson Family"	South Central Los Angeles, California	January 16, 2005	214
Rodney Anderson was visiting his family when he was shot by gang members, who had mistaken him for someone else. The bullet caused him to be a paraplegic and spend the rest of his life in a wheelchair. His sister and her three children moved into the family home to help take care of him. His family had received a grant to make his home wheelchair accessible, but it was stolen by a contractor. Worse yet, a year after Rodney was shot, his father Joe was injured in a car crash, causing several of his toes to be removed. In addition to renovating the house, the design team also planned a wedding for Rodney and his fiancée after the reveal. (Note: This is one of only two houses (the other being the Chapin house in ep 103) that took longer than seven days to complete (eight days were needed).) Ty's secret project – Parents' master bedroom Design team – Ty, Ed, Paige, Preston, Tracy
27	13	"The Sears Family"	Martinez, California	January 23, 2005	213
Jhryve Sears has Krabbe disease. She's been living in a hospital since doctors have deemed her home in Martinez, California unsuitable due to a mold infestation. The team came in and built the family a new home with a hospital-grade filtration system. (Note: This is one of the two episodes of Extreme Makeover: Home Edition did not have a vacation, because Jhryve stayed in isolation on a local hospital.) Ty's secret room – Gym and swimming pool from Endless Pools; Design team – Ty, Constance, Eduardo, Michael, Paul First appearance of Eduardo Xol
28	14	"The Correa and Medeiros Families"	Denver, Colorado	February 13, 2005	212
The Extreme Makeover teams works with HomeAid America and Colorado Homeless Families for the Correa and Medeiros families. The Correa family had been living in a homeless shelter and the Medeiros family had been living with friends. They also arrange a job for Frank Correa and another man from the homeless shelter. (Note: First family to get a makeover in the Rocky Mountains) Sadly, Frank Correa was killed by a hit and run driver in December of 2009. Ty's secret room – Community center Design team – Ty, Constance, Eduardo, Paul, Tracy
29	15	"The Harper Family"	Lake City, Georgia	February 20, 2005	215
While living in the projects in Brooklyn, New York, Patricia and Milton Harper lost their 2-year-old son to a choking accident. Wanting a better life, they moved their family to a home south of Atlanta, Georgia. Unfortunately, their home is a mess. The basement fills up with raw sewage any time it rains and forces the family to spend many nights sleeping in their minivan. (Note: During this episode, Ty suffered a perforated appendix, and his segment of the show was taped from a local hospital. "Sweet" Alice Harris came to visit him during his stay.) (Note: First family to get a makeover in the South) Ty's secret room – Ty made the music room his secret project, however due to his appendix problem, Paul DiMeo did most of the work on his behalf. David Turner, an insulation contractor from Big Canoe, Georgia helped advise. Design team – Ty, Constance, Ed, Eduardo, Michael, Paul Special guest – Jeff Foxworthy
30	16	"The Harris Family"	Center Point, Alabama	March 6, 2005	216
The Harris family consists of Chris, Diamond, nine-year-old son DeWayne, and America's first surviving set of African-American sextuplets. In addition to raising seven children under the age of 10, the Harris home was also damaged by Hurricane Ivan. The Extreme Makeover team built the Harris Family a better house, including a giant playroom for the sextuplets. Ty's secret room – Master Bedroom Suite; Design team – Ty, Constance, Eduardo, Michael, Paul Special guests – Florence Henderson and the Muppets
31	17	"The Okvath Family"	Gilbert, Arizona	March 13, 2005	217
Kassandra Okvath is an eight-year-old cancer survivor who asks the Extreme Makeover team to help renovate the children's cancer wing of the local hospital to make it a happier place for those receiving treatment. While the Okvath family was sent to work on the hospital, the Extreme Makeover team surprised the family with a home makeover of their own. While Kassandra continues to stay healthy, the Okvath's have struggled to cover the soaring utility bills of their 7,200 sq ft (670 m^{2}) home and were left to take out a loan to cover the costs. Things were further complicated when father, Brian Okvath, lost his job in 2008. Later he obtained a new position with a trucking company but was injured on the job. The family has put the home on the market but is facing a foreclosure auction in May due to the backlog of luxury homes in Arizona. The house has since been sold. Ty's secret room – Kassandra's Garden Bedroom; Design team – Ty, Constance, Ed, Paige, Preston, Paul (came in to take over for Ed) Special guest – Carly Patterson
32	18	"The Leomiti-Higgins Family"	Santa Fe Springs, California	March 27, 2005	218
After the parents of the five Higgins' children died, the Leomiti family invited them to live in their small 3-bedroom house. The Extreme Makeover team tore down the old house and built a brand new house for 11 people. (Note: In August 2005, the Higgins siblings who appeared on the show sued ABC, the Leomiti family, and Pardee Homes, the contractor who built the new house.) Shortly after the build, the Higgins children (aged 14 to 21 years) left their new home under the claim that they were "evicted" by the Leomiti family. While a lawsuit followed, it was dismissed. Ty's secret room – Leomiti Master Bedroom; Design team – Ty, Constance, Ed, Michael, Paul Special guest – California Governor Arnold Schwarzenegger
33	19	"The Leslie Family"	Braithwaite, Louisiana	April 3, 2005	219
Robin Leslie recently lost her husband and oldest son in a car crash and was left to raise her three young sons alone in a fixer-upper farm house in Louisiana. The Extreme Makeover team gutted the inside of the house instead of demolishing the entire house to help keep the historic nature of the house. The team finished at 11:59:40 pm on Day 7, but did not bring the family home until the next morning. As an added gift, Robin was given a scholarship to finish her master's degree. Ty's secret room – Master Bedroom Suite; Design team – Ty, Eduardo, Paige, Paul, Preston Special guest – BMX champion Mat "The Condor" Hoffman
34	20	"The Harvey Family"	Hastings, Florida	April 24, 2005	220
Willie Harvey, a mechanic and heavy equipment operator, also was repairing his family's 1930 Army barracks home when he was diagnosed with epilepsy. He's been unable to get a job, and his wife is working two jobs and going to school to get her nursing degree. Because Willie hasn't been able to keep up with the repairs needed on their home, it's in need of an Extreme Makeover. Ty's secret room – Game Room Design team – Ty, Ed, Michael, Paige, Preston
35	21	"The Dolan Family"	St. Petersburg, Florida	May 1, 2005	221
James Dolan (aka, "Jamie") was a worker at a local electronic store in St. Petersburg, Florida. In November 2004, an unknown man walked into the store where James worked and shot him in the head at point-blank range. James completely lost his eyesight but he miraculously survived. The gunman killed two other innocent people before turning the gun on himself. James and his wife, Chrissy, bought his childhood home to raise their own children. James was a pretty good handyman, and enjoyed fixing up the house. But then, it became difficult for him to do everyday tasks since he lost his eyesight. The design team replaced the Dolans' 1960s-era ranch house with a brand new navigation-friendly home for Jamie. An electronic voice-activated machine was installed on the first floor and Jamie can tell the machine to perform a command (e.g. "turn on the lights"). The machine can also give him news on the stock market, and other everyday information. The team also included distinct and intricate walls for Jamie to feel so that Jamie knows what room he is in. Ty's secret room - Master bedroom for Chrissy's brother and sister-in-law Design team - Ty, Eduardo, Paul, Preston, Constance
36	22	"The Johnson Family"	Kansas City, Missouri	May 8, 2005	223
Stephen Johnson is the father of five kids (three from birth and two he adopted). One day, paramedic Mary Seymour was shot, so Stephen and five other firefighters had to save her. As a result for saving her life, Mary nominated him for the makeover. Not only is he a firefighter, but he has two other jobs to work with as well. The children describe him as "a hero, excellence, awesome, inspiring, and loving." Because Stephen Jr. is into cars, Paige decided to give him and his dad a new Ford Mustang convertible on the driveway. Meanwhile, Ty made a special glass sculpture with the inscribed words from the children for Stephen. Ty's secret room - He actually took on two projects – Gina's room, and a special section of the backyard for where the sculpture now resides. Design team - Ty, Michael, Constance, Paige, Ed
37	23	"The Vitale Family"	Long Island, New York	May 15, 2005	222
John Vitale, 32, works as a police officer with the Suffolk County Police Department. He and Anne-Marie were a young, happily married couple with three little children: Jack (4), Adrian (2½), and Luke (18 months). Their family was growing quickly so they moved out of their small, two-bedroom home to Anne-Marie's parents' house. But soon after they moved out, tragedy struck in August 2004. Anne-Marie died of an aggressive form of leukemia and was buried on what would have been her 29th birthday. John couldn't renovate his home as the family's savings accounts were drained after paying hospital bills and for Anne-Marie's burial. He and his children need their house back so the design team came to the rescue to build a new home in memory of a young wife and mother. Ty's secret room – A secret lounge for John behind a bookcase in his bedroom Design Team – Ty, Paige, Constance, Paul, and Michael Special Guest – Tenor Daniel Rodriguez
38	24	"The Piestewa Family"	Tuba City, Arizona	May 22, 2005	224
In March 2003, Lori Piestewa was the first American woman to be killed in action in the Iraq War, and is also believed to be the first Native American woman to die in a foreign war. She died when the Humvee she was driving was hit by an RPG. She had previously told her roommate and best friend Jessica Lynch, who would become a POW in the same incident, that her dream was to return to her home on the Navajo Nation near Williams, Arizona and build her parents a home. A divorced mother, she left behind two young children who were being cared for by her parents, Percy and Terry Piestewa, in a rented mobile home. Lynch applied for a makeover for Lori's family. In a two-parter, the team built the family a new home in Flagstaff, where they had expressed a desire to move. The team not only built the new home, but also built a Veterans Affairs building dedicated as a meeting place for Native American veterans in the area. The homebuilders gave $50,000 to the family, and Sears gave $300,000 worth of clothing to families on the Navajo reservation. Ty's secret room - A memorial room to honor Lori; Design team - Ty, Paul, Michael, Constance, Preston, Paige, Ed, Eduardo Special guest - Jessica Lynch

== See also ==
- List of Extreme Makeover: Home Edition episodes
- Extreme Makeover: Home Edition Specials
