= It Was the Son =

2012 film

- Film poster
- Italian: È stato il figlio
- Directed by: Daniele Ciprì
- Written by: Roberto Alajmo; Daniele Ciprì; Massimo Gaudioso; Miriam Rizzo
- Produced by: Alessandra Acciai; Giorgio Magliulo
- Starring: Toni Servillo
- Cinematography: Daniele Ciprì
- Release date: 1 September 2012 (Venice)
- Running time: 90 minutes
- Country: Italy
- Language: Italian

It Was the Son (Italian: È stato il figlio) is a 2012 Italian comedy-drama film directed by Daniele Ciprì. The film was selected to compete for the Golden Lion at the 69th Venice International Film Festival, where Ciprì won the Osella for Best Cinematography.

== Premise ==
The main story unfolds within the frame story of an older man waiting to pay bills at a post office in Palermo, who captivates his listeners by promising to tell the story of a boy who killed his father over a scratched car. Nicola Ciraulo is a father (Toni Servillo as Nicola Ciraulo) trying to teach his son (Alfredo Castro as Busu) the basics of his maritime salvage / scavenging business. Soon thereafter, Nicola's daughter is killed by mafioso. This murder entitles the family to compensation for their loss, which brings out their greed and begins the central conflict of the story.

== Cast ==
- Toni Servillo as Nicola Ciraulo
- Giselda Volodi as Loredana Ciraulo
- Alfredo Castro as Busu
- Fabrizio Falco as Tancredi Ciraulo
- Aurora Quattrocchi as Nonna Rosa

== Reception ==
Variety called it "an annoying parody of an Italo pic" and stated that it diminished Italy's international filmmaking reputation. The Hollywood Reporter said that the film "has curiosity value, but it ends up feeling too flat and bleak."
