= The Neighbor No. Thirteen =

- Film poster
- Directed by: Yasuo Inoue
- Written by: Hajime Kado
- Based on: Rinjin 13-gō by Santa Inoue
- Starring: Shido Nakamura; Shun Oguri
- Cinematography: Taro Kawazu
- Edited by: Urahama Taro; Shôjirô Urahama
- Music by: Reiji Kitazato
- Distributed by: Media Suits
- Release date: 28 January 2005 (Japan)
- Running time: 115 minutes
- Country: Japan
- Language: Japanese

The Neighbor No. Thirteen (Japanese: 隣人13号, Hepburn: Rinjin 13-gō) is a horror film directed by Yasuo Inoue and written by Hajime Kado. It is based on Santa Inoue's manga of the same name, with Oguri Shun, Hirofumi Arai and Nakamura Shido in major roles.

The first volume of the manga is available in English on Kindle.

== Plot ==
Juzo Murasaki (Oguri Shun) arrives at a work construction area for his new job as a construction worker. To his quiet dismay, his supervising boss is Toru Akai (Hirofumi Arai) who, along with his gang, had made Juzo's life a living hell during their middle school years. Akai however doesn't recognise Juzo.

Juzo becomes more disconcerted when he discovers Akai is living with his wife, Nozomi Akai (Yumi Yoshimura), and their toddler son above Juzo's new apartment. As he struggles to accept those unexpected developments, a mysterious sinister-looking hooded figure appears nearby. When Juzo later has a closer look, half of the man's face is scarred and he calls himself Number 13 (Nakamura Shido).

As Juzo attempts to control his flashbacks and dreams, boss Akai constantly picks on him and other workers including another former middle-school student Seki Hajime (Tomoya Ishii), who ignores Juzo's asocial tendencies by being a friendly face. Meanwhile, Akai's wife Nozomi attempts to make friends with Juzo by inviting him into her home and encouraging him to look after her toddler son. One evening she proudly shows Juzo her husband's school photos. Juzo notices the mark X in a gap between students. He suffers an intense flashback, which reveals the cause of his absence that day: Akai and his gang bully Juzo in the school's science room until they throw acid at Juzo's face.

At construction site, Seki becomes suspicious of Juzo's increasingly odd behaviour, and goes to Akai with his concerns. Unaware that Number 13 is watching, Seki tries to get Akai's attention, but Akai walks away. Seki becomes aware of Number 13, who immediately kills him. Number 13 haunts Juzo wherever he goes. Meanwhile, Arai watches Juzo with growing suspicion as a number of his workers and neighbours disappear without trace.

After finding Nozomi's body in the apartment upstairs with the toddler nowhere in sight, Juzo realises where Number 13 has taken the toddler son to and hurries off to save the boy. Coming home from work, Akai discovers his wife's body and his son gone. He's already guessed Juzo was a former classmate and that he has taken his son to their middle school.

At school, Juzo finds the toddler drowned in a school bathroom and realises Number 13 is out of control. He walks around the school, trying to find Number 13. He comes across Akai, who attacks Juzo while demanding his son back. After a violent confrontation, Juzo—who we realise is Number 13 all along—kneels over Akai on the floor. As he is about to stab Akai's head, Akai desperately shouts: "I'm sorry!" Juzo freezes. The apology splits Juzo's universe into two.

Universe #1: as described above.

Universe #2: in the science room, Juzo rebels against Akai's bullying, which causes Akai to apologise. Juzo later appears in a class photo as a happy-looking middle school student next to Akai and the gang. As an adult, he walks past an apartment block where he and the Akai family lived in Universe #1. Juzo notes construction workers are taking down the apartment-block sign, which suggests the block is slated to be demolished. He spots a dark hooded figure standing in a window. It's Number 13. Juzo looks away as if he doesn't recognise him, and continues walking next to his work friend. It's Akai.

At this point, we viewers realise the events in Universe #1 never took place in Universe #2. Universe #1 is a scenario of what could have been if Juzo hadn't stood up to Akai's bullying in the science room, which could end with having acid thrown at Juzo's face. This would have given birth to Number 13 albeit Universe #1.

== Cast ==
- Nakamura Shido as 13-gō / No. 13 (Shido Nakamura)
- Oguri Shun as Jūzō Murasaki
- Hirofumi Arai as Tōru Akai
- Yumi Yoshimura as Nozomi Akai
- Tomoya Ishii as Hajime Seki
- Takashi Miike as Kaneda (next door neighbour)
- Minoru Matsumoto as Shinigami
