= The Millennial Rapture =

- Directed by: Kōji Wakamatsu
- Screenplay by: Kenji Nakagami; Kōji Wakamatsu
- Produced by: Noriko Ozaki; Kôji Wakamatsu
- Starring: Shinobu Terajima; Shirō Sano; Arata Iura; Kengo Kôra; Sousuke Takaoka; Shota Sometani
- Cinematography: Tomohiko Tsuji
- Edited by: Kumiko Sakamoto
- Music by: Hashiken; Mizuki Nakamura
- Release date: 2012
- Language: Japanese

The Millennial Rapture (Japanese: 千年の愉楽, romanized: Sennen no yuraku, lit. 'A Thousand Years of Delight') is a 2012 Japanese drama film co-written and directed by Kōji Wakamatsu. Based on a novel by Kenji Nakagami, it premiered in the Orizzonti competition at the 69th Venice International Film Festival.

== Cast ==
- Shinobu Terajima as Oryunooba
- Shirō Sano as Reijo
- Arata Iura as Hikonosuke Nakamoto
- Kengo Kôra as Hanzo Nakamoto
- Sousuke Takaoka as Miyoshi Taguchi
- Shota Sometani as Tatsuo Nakamoto
- Tomori Abe as Hatsue
- Akie Namiki as Kane
- Go Jibiki as Seiji
- Hitomi Katayama as Ranko
- Anna Ishibashi as Yukino
- Mayu Harada
- Tanroh Ishida
