= Jazmin Lopez =

Argentinian filmmaker

Jazmin Lopez (born 1984) is an Argentinian filmmaker. She was named one of the best new filmmakers of the 2010s by Richard Peña, Professor at the Columbia University School of the Arts. Her debut feature-length film, Leones (Lions), was reviewed in The New York Times, La Nación, Variety and Slant Magazine. Her subsequent films include Si yo fuera el invierno mismo (If I Were the Winter Itself) (2020).

== Filmography ==
- Leones (2012)
- Si yo fuera el invierno mismo (If I Were the Winter Itself) (2020)
