= Istituto Luce =

Former Italian film production and distribution company

- Logo used from 1942 to 2011
- Type: State-owned
- Genre: Film production and film distribution
- Founded: 1924; 102 years ago
- Founder: Benito Mussolini
- Defunct: 2011; 15 years ago
- Fate: Merged with and absorbed into Luce Cinecittà; Liquidation
- Successor: Cinecittà
- Headquarters: Rome, Italy

The Istituto Luce ("Light Institute", with Luce being the acronym for L'Unione Cinematografica Educativa, i.e. "The Educational Film Union") was Italy’s public film agency corporation, created in 1924 during the Fascist era. The institute, based in Rome, was involved in the production and distribution of films and documentaries intended for being screened in cinemas. Famous for having been a powerful propaganda tool of the fascist regime, it is considered as the oldest public institution devoted to production and distribution of cinematographic materials for didactic and informative purposes in the world.

== History and profile ==
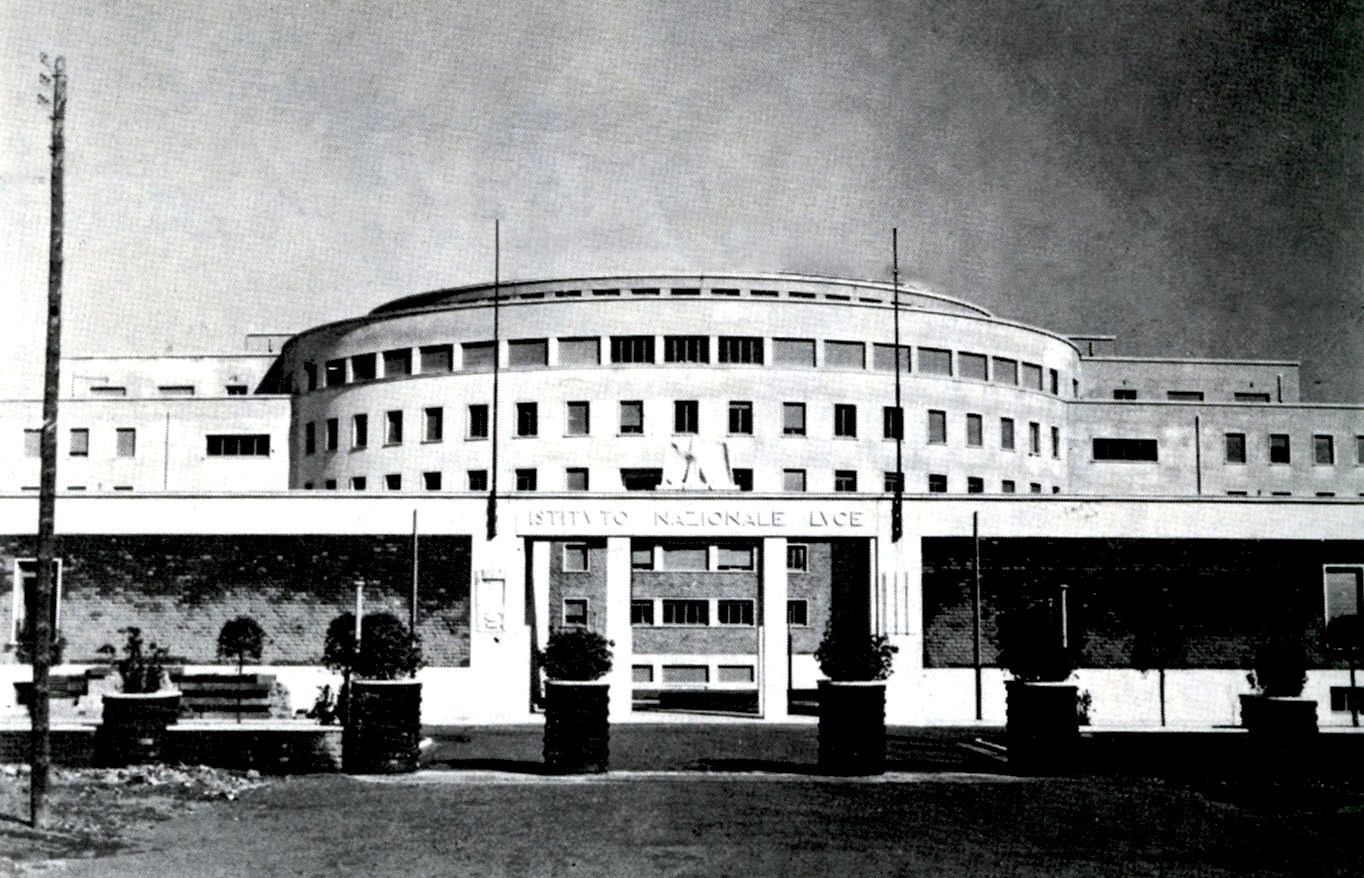
New seat of the Istituto Luce in 1937

Istituto Luce was founded in 1924 as a stock company, and then Benito Mussolini through the Royal Decree Law no. 1985 of 5 November 1925 ruled it as non-profit "moral institution" governed by public law.

In July 1925 the Presidency of the Council of Ministers sent out a circular to the Ministers of Interior, Education, Economy and Colonies asking them to use exclusively Istituto Luce for their educational and propaganda purposes.

In 1927 it created the newsreel Giornale Luce, intended to be screened compulsorily in all Italian cinemas before the screening of their films.

In 1935, the Istituto Luce established the Ente Nazionale Industrie Cinematografiche (ENIC), a branch dealing with film production: one of the first films produced was the 1937 blockbuster Scipio Africanus: The Defeat of Hannibal by Carmine Gallone. In 1936 the Institute ceased to depend directly on the prime minister and went under the MinCulPop.

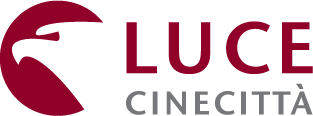
Logo of Istituto Luce Cinecittà

Logo for the Luce Archives used since 2018

After the war the company continued to engage in production of numerous documentaries and films (directed, among others, by Pupi Avati, Marco Bellocchio, Claude Chabrol, Liliana Cavani, Mario Monicelli, Ermanno Olmi, and Ettore Scola). In 2009 the company was merged with Cinecittà Holding SpA, setting up a joint stock company: Cinecittà Luce SpA, which in 2011 was renamed Istituto Luce Cinecittà.

As of July 2012, a large collection of movies (about 30,000) was made available to the public through a YouTube channel, thanks to an agreement with Google.
