= 17th Asia Pacific Screen Awards =

Film awards ceremony

- Awarded for: Excellence in cinema and performance in Asia Pacific region
- Awarded by: Asia Pacific Screen Academy
- Presented by: UNESCO; FIAPF
- Date: 30 November 2024
- Site: Home of the Arts, Gold Coast, Australia
- Official website: www.asiapacificscreenawards.com

Highlights
- Most awards: April (2)
- Most nominations: All We Imagine as Light & April (5)

The 17th Asia Pacific Screen Awards, presented by UNESCO, FIAPF (International Federation of Film Producers Associations) and the Brisbane City Council, took place on 30 November 2024 at the Home of the Arts, Gold Coast, Queensland, Australia, to recognize the best in cinema of the Asia Pacific Region of 2024.

The nominations were announced on 16 October 2024. The most nominated films were All We Imagine as Light, a co-production between France, India, Netherlands and Luxembourg, directed by Payal Kapadia, and April, a co-production between Georgia, Italy and France, directed by Dea Kulumbegashvili, with both films being up for five awards each.

For the first time since the inception of the category, the non-gendered award for Best Performance consisted of only female performers. Similarly, four out of the five nominees for Best Director are female filmmakers.

== Winners and nominees ==
The nominations were announced on 16 October 2024. The winners are listed first and in bold.

**Best Film**: **April ( (Georgia (country)) (Italy) (France) )** **Directed by Dea Kulumbegashvili** **Produced by David Zerat, Ilan Amouyal, Luca Guadagnino, Francesco Melzi d’Eril, Archil Gelovani, Gabriele Moratti, Alexandra Rossi**; All We Imagine as Light ( (France) (India) (Netherlands) (Luxembourg) ) Directed by Payal Kapadia Produced by Thomas Hakim, Julien Graff; Desert of Namibia ( (Japan) ) Directed by Yôko Yamanaka Produced by Keisuke Konishi; Happyend ( (Japan) (United States) ) Directed by Neo Sora Produced by Albert Tholen, Aiko Masubuchi, Eric Nyari, Alex C Lo, Anthony Chen; To Kill a Mongolian Horse ( (Malaysia) (Hong Kong) (South Korea) (Japan) (Saudi Arabia) (Thailand) (United States) ) Directed by Jiang Xiaoxuan Produced by Mo Zhulin	**Best Director**: **Tato Kotetishvili – Holy Electricity**; Payal Kapadia – All We Imagine as Light; Dea Kulumbegashvili – April; Rithy Panh – Meeting with Pol Pot; Jiang Xiaoxuan – To Kill a Mongolian Horse
**Best Performance**: **Ia Sukhitashvili as Nina in April**; Kani Kusruti as Prabha in All We Imagine as Light; Yuumi Kawai as Kana in Desert of Namibia; Madina Akylbekova as Madina in Madina; Soheila Golestani as Najmeh in The Seed of the Sacred Fig	**Best Youth Film**: **Boong – Lakshmipriya Devi, Alan McAlex, Vikesh Bhutani, Ritesh Sidhwani, Farhan Akhtar, Shujaat Saudagar (India)**; Magic Beach – Robert Connolly, Emma Kelly, Susan Danta, Lee Whitmore, Anthony Lucas, Kathy Sarpi, Eddie White, Simon Rippingale, Pierce Davison, Marieka Walsh, Susie Shapones, Jake Duczynski, Liz Kearney, Kate Laurie, Chloé Brugalé (Australia); She Sat There Like All Ordinary Ones – Qu Youjia, Meng Xie, Xianjian Wu (China); Sunshine – Antoinette Jadaone, Geo Lomuntad, Dan Villegas, Bianca Balbuena (Philippines); The Mountain – Rachel House, Desray Armstrong, Morgan Waru (New Zealand)
**Best Animated Film**: **The Missing – Carl Joseph Papa, Geo Lomuntad, Dan Villegas (Philippines)**; Ghost Cat Anzu – Yoko Kuno, Nobuhiro Yamashita, Keiichi Kondo, Emmanuel-Alain Raynal, Pierre Baussaron, Hiroyuki Negishi (Japan, France); Memoir of a Snail – Adam Elliot, Liz Kearney (Australia); Pig That Survived Foot-and-Mouth Disease – Hur Bum-wook, Cho Heaseung (South Korea); The Colors Within – Naoko Yamada, Eunyoung Choi, Yoshihiro Furusawa, enki Kawamura, Wakana Okamura, Kohei Sakita (Japan)	**Best Documentary Film**: **No Other Land – Basel Adra, Rachel Szor, Hamdan Ballal, Yuval Abraham, Fabien Greenberg, Bård Kjøge Rønning (Palestine, Norway)**; Breaking the Cycle – Aekaphong Saransate, Thanakrit Duangmaneeporn, Komtouch Napattaloong, Tanwarat Sombatwattana (Thailand); Kamay – Ilyas Yourish, Shahrokh Bikaran, Hanne Phlypo, Evelien De Graef (Afghanistan, Belgium, France, Germany); XiXi – Fan Wu, Venice De Castro Atienza, Sona Jo, Yoonsoo Her (Taiwan, Philippines, South Korea); Youth (Homecoming) – Wang Bing, Sonia Buchman, Mao Hui, Nicolas R De La Mothe, Vincent Wang (France, Luxembourg, Netherlands)
**Best Screenplay**: **Hesitation Wound – Selman Nacar**; All We Imagine as Light – Payal Kapadia; April – Dea Kulumbegashvili; Happyend – Neo Sora; The Adamant Girl – PS Vinothraj	**Best Cinematography**: **Mongrel – Michaël Capron**; All We Imagine as Light – Ranabir Das; April – Arseni Khachaturan; Stranger Eyes – Hideho Urata; Viet and Nam – Son Doan
**Best New Performance**: **Data Chachua as Sandro in Panopticon**	**Jury Grand Prize**: **All We Imagine as Light**
**Young Cinema Award**: **Neo Sora for Happyend**	**FIAPF Award**: **Cliff Curtis**
**Cultural Diversity Award**: **Shambhala – Min Bahadur Bham**
