= 14th Asia Pacific Screen Awards =

Film awards ceremony

- Awarded for: Excellence in Cinema and performance in Asia Pacific region
- Awarded by: Asia Pacific Screen Academy
- Presented by: UNESCO; FIAPF-International Federation of Film Producers Associations
- Date: 11 November 2021
- Site: Home of the Arts, Gold Coast, Australia
- Official website: APSA 2021

Highlights
- Best Film: Drive My Car
- Best Direction: Asghar Farhadi; A Hero
- Best Actor: Merab Ninidze; House Arrest
- Best Actress: Azmeri Haque Badhon; Rehana Maryam Noor

The 14th Asia Pacific Screen Awards were held on 11 November 2021 in Gold Coast, Queensland, Australia.

== Jury ==
International Jury was composed of:

- Tran Anh Hung, President, French/Vietnamese filmmaker
- Annemarie Jacir, Palestinian filmmaker
- Nashen Moodley, Director of Sydney Film Festival (Australia)
- Sooni Taraporevala, Indian photographer, screenwriter and filmmaker
- Janet Wu, President of Heaven Pictures and Director of China Film Foundation – Wu Tianming Film Fund for Young Talents, (People’s Republic of China)

== Winners and nominees ==
Complete list of nominees: and Winners:

Best Feature Film	Achievement in Directing
Drive My Car - Ryusuke Hamaguchi (Japan); A Hero - Asghar Farhadi (Iran) (France); A Night of Knowing Nothing - Payal Kapadia (India) (France); The Pencil - Natalya Nazarova (Russia); There Is No Evil - Mohammad Rasoulof (Iran)	Asghar Farhadi - A Hero (Iran) (France); Dea Kulumbegashvili - Beginning (Georgia (country)) (France); Ryusuke Hamaguchi - Drive My Car - (Japan); P. S. Vinothraj - Pebbles (India); Kamila Andini - Yuni (Indonesia)
Best Performance by an Actor	Best Performance by an Actress
Merab Ninidze – House Arrest (Russia); Levan Tediashvili Brighton 4th (Georgia (country)); Hidetoshi Nishijima – Drive My Car (Japan); Caleb Landry Jones – Nitram (Australia); Amir Jadidi – A Hero (Iran) (France)	Azmeri Haque Badhon – Rehana Maryam Noor (Bangladesh); Alena Yiv – Asia as Asia (Israel); Valentina Romanova-Chyskyyray – Scarecrow (Russia); Leah Purcell – The Drover’s Wife The Legend of Molly Johnson as Molly Johnson (Australia); Essie Davis – The Justice of Bunny King as Bunny King (New Zealand)
Best Screenplay	Best Youth Feature Film
Ryusuke Hamaguchi, Takamasa Oe – Drive My Car (Japan); Dana Idisis - Here We Are (Israel) (Italy); Asif Rustamov, Roelof Jan Minneboo, Ilgar Najaf - Sughra's Sons (Azerbaijan) (France) (Germany); Asghar Farhadi - A Hero (Iran) (France); Nasim Ahmadpour, Shahram Mokri - Careless Crime (Iran)	Moving On - Yoon Dan-bi (South Korea); Brother’s Keeper - Ferit Karahan (Turkey); Scales (Sayidat Al Bahr) - Shahad Ameen (Saudi Arabia) (Iraq) (United Arab Emirates); Voices in the Wind - Nobuhiro Suwa (Japan); When Pomegranates Howl - Granaz Moussavi (Afghanistan) (Australia)
Best Documentary Feature Film	Best Animated Feature Film
Sabaya - Hogir Hirori (Sweden); Gorbachev. Heaven - Vitaly Mansky (Latvia) (Czech Republic); Miguel's War - Eliane Raheb (Lebanon) (Spain) (Germany); The Devil's Drivers - Mohammed Abugeth, Daniel Carsenty (Qatar) (Lebanon) (France) (Germany); Writing with Fire - Sushmit Ghosh, Rintu Thomas (India)	The Nose or the Conspiracy of Mavericks (Nos, ili Zagovor Netakih) - Andrei Khrzhanovsky (Russia); Beauty Water - Cho Kyung-hun (South Korea); Fortune Favors Lady Nikuko - Ayumu Watanabe (Japan); The Knight and the Princess - Bashir el-Deek, Ibrahim Mousa (Saudi Arabia) (Egypt); Where Is Anne Frank - Ari Folman (Belgium)
Achievement in Cinematography	UNESCO Award
Nguyễn Vinh Phúc – Taste (Vietnam) (Singapore) (Thailand) (Germany); Akiko Ashizawa – Vengeance Is Mine, All Others Pay Cash (Indonesia) (Singapore) (Germany); Feng Yuchao Robbin – A New Old Play (Hong Kong) (France); Phuttiphong Aroonpheng – Anatomy of Time (Thailand) (Singapore) (France) (Netherlands); Vignesh Kumulai and Che Parthiban – Pebbles (India)	Prasanna Vithanage – Children of the Sun (Sri Lanka)
