= 19th Asia Pacific Screen Awards =

Film awards ceremony 2026 edition

- Official poster
- Awarded for: Excellence in cinema and performance in Asia Pacific region
- Awarded by: Asia Pacific Screen Academy
- Presented by: UNESCO; FIAPF
- Announced on: Nominations: September 9, 2026
- Presented on: 30 October 2026
- Site: The Star Gold Coast, Gold Coast, Queensland, Australia
- Official website: asiapacificscreenawards.com

Highlights
- Best Film: Guria
- Best Direction: Sompot Chidgasornpongse; 9 Temples to Heaven

The 19th Asia Pacific Screen Awards, presented by UNESCO, FIAPF (International Federation of Film Producers Associations) and the Brisbane City Council, in partnership with APSA took place on 30 October 2026 at The Star Gold Coast, Gold Coast, Queensland, Australia, to recognize the best in cinema of the Asia Pacific Region of 2026.

This year, the award ceremony and the 8th Asia Pacific Screen Forum (to be held from 28–30 October 2026) took place at the same venue as the Australian International Movie Convention, so the whole Asia-Pacific film industry gathered in one place for the first time.

Nomination invited in four categories: Feature Film, Animated Feature Film, Youth Feature Film and Documentary Feature Film, were announced on 9 September 2026.

== Jury ==
The juries were composed of:

=== International jury ===
- Mandy Walker, AM, ACS, ASC, Australian cinematographer (jury president)
- Jenna Ku, South Korean producer, founder and CEO of VOL Media
- Stefano Centini, Italian-Taiwanese film producer, founder of production company Volos Films
- Trương Minh Quý, Vietnamese filmmaker

=== Youth, Animation, Documentary international jury ===
- Bianca Balbuena, Filipino producer, writer, co-founder and CEO of Epicmedia Productions Inc
- Mark Coles Smith, Aboriginal Australian actor of stage and screen, sound designer, field recordist, writer and composer
- Shivani Pandya Malhotra, Indian executive international screen, co-founder and partner of Ta Films.

== Winners and nominees ==
The nominations were announced on 9 September 2026.

Winners are listed first and highlighted in boldface.

**Best Film**: **Guria ( (Georgia (country)) (Switzerland) (Luxembourg) (Bulgaria) (Turkey) (Saudi Arabia) (Norway) )** **Directed by Levan Koguashvili**; 9 Temples to Heaven ( (Thailand) (Singapore) (France) (Norway) (China) (Hong Kong) (Indonesia) (Qatar) ) Directed by Sompot Chidgasornpongse; All of a Sudden ( (France) (Japan) (Germany) (Belgium) ) Directed by Ryusuke Hamaguchi; Elephants in the Fog ( (France) (Nepal) (Germany) (Brazil) (Norway) }) Directed by Abinash Bikram Shah; No Good Men ( (France) (Denmark) (Germany) (Norway) (Afghanistan) ) Directed by Shahrbanoo Sadat	**Best Director**: **Sompot Chidgasornpongse – 9 Temples to Heaven**; **Aung Phyoe – Fruit Gathering (Special Mention)**; Abinash Bikram Shah – Elephants in the Fog; Jennifer Peedom – Tenzing; Ryusuke Hamaguchi – All of a Sudden
**Best Animated Film**: **The Violinist ( (Singapore) (Italy) (Spain) )** **Directed by Ervin Han, Raúl García**; Light Pillar ( (China) ) Directed by Xu Zao; Magic Atlas ( (Singapore) ) Directed by Sun Xun; A Mighty Adventure ( (Taiwan) (Malaysia) (Hong Kong) ) Directed by Toe Yuen; Zsazsa Zaturnnah ( (Philippines) (France) ) directed by Avid Liongoren	**Best Documentary Film**: **One in a Million ( (United States) (United Kingdom) )** **Directed by Itab Azzam, Jack MacInness**; 32 Meters ( (Turkey) (Qatar) (Iran) ) Directed by Morteza Atabaki; Colors of White Rock ( (France) (Mongolia) ) directed by Khoroldorj Choijoovanchig; Baby Jackfruit Baby Guava ( (Vietnam) (South Korea) ) directed by Nhật Quang Nông; Rehearsals for a Revolution ( (Czech Republic) (Spain) ) directed by Pegah Ahangarani
**Best Youth Film**: **Big Girls Don't Cry ( (New Zealand) )** **Directed by Paloma Schneideman**; Our Share of Sand ( (United Kingdom) (India) (Greece) ) Directed by Shalini Adnani; Don’t Tell Mother ( (India) (Australia) ) directed by Anoop Lokkur; En Route To ( (South Korea) ) directed by Yoo Jaein; Funky Freaky Freaks ( (South Korea) ) directed by Han Chang-lok	**Best Cinematography**: **Nguyễn Vinh Phúc – Hearing**; Batara Goempar – Four Seasons in Java; Emo Weemhoff – The Burning Giants; Gigi Samsonadze and Giorgi Shvelidze – Guria; Warwick Thornton – Wolfram
**Best Performance**: **Pushpa Thing Lama – Elephants in the Fog**; Virginie Efira and Tao Okamoto – All of a Sudden; Anwar Hashimi – No Good Men; Ghassan Saad – Pipes; Yeo Yann Yann – We Are All Strangers	**Best Screenplay**: **Rakan Mayasi – Yesterday the Eye Didn’t Sleep**; Ghasideh Golmakani – Head to Head; Yashasvi Juyal and Ankit Thapa – The Ink Stained Hand and the Missing Thumb; Mohammed Hammad – Safe Exit; Sara Ishaq and Nadia Eliewat – The Station
**Best New Performer**: **Sim Su-bin – The World Before** ( (South Korea) )	**Young Cinema Award**: **R Gowtham – Members of the Problematic Family** ( (India) )
**Jury Grand Prize**: **No Good Men ( (Germany) (France) (Norway) (Denmark) (Afghanistan) )** **Directed by Shahrbanoo Sadat**	**Cultural Diversity Award**: **Another Birth ( (Tajikistan) , (United States) , (Qatar) )** **Directed and produced by Isabelle Kalandar**
