= Asia Pacific Screen Award for Best Director =

The Asia Pacific Screen Award for Best Director, formerly known as the Asia Pacific Screen Award for Achievement in Directing, is an award category of the annual Asia Pacific Screen Awards. The award has been given annually by the Asia Pacific Screen Academy since 2007.

== Winners and nominees ==
=== 2000s ===
Year	Winner and nominees	Film	Original title
2007 (1st)	(Iran) Rakhshan Bani-E'temad and Mohsen Abdolvahab	Mainline	Khoon Bazi,
2007 (1st)	(Lebanon) Nadine Labaki	Caramel	سكر بنات / Sekkar banat
2007 (1st)	(China) Peng Tao	Little Moth	血蝉;/ xuè chán
2007 (1st)	(Kurdistan Region) Shawkat Amin Korki	Crossing the Dust	Perrînewe le xobar
2007 (1st)	(Kazakhstan) Zhanna Issabayeva	Karoy	
2008 (2nd)	(Turkey) Nuri Bilge Ceylan	Three Monkeys	Üç Maymun,
2008 (2nd)	(Hong Kong) Johnnie To	Sparrow	文雀 / Man Jeuk
2008 (2nd)	(Korea) Kim Jee-woon	The Good, the Bad, the Weird	좋은 놈, 나쁜 놈, 이상한 놈;/ Jo-eun nom nappeun nom isanghan nom
2008 (2nd)	(Japan) Kiyoshi Kurosawa	Tokyo Sonata	トウキョウソナタ / Tōkyō Sonata
2008 (2nd)	(Kazakhstan) Sergey Dvortsevoy	Tulpan	Тюльпан
2009 (3rd)	(China) Lu Chuan	City of Life and Death	南京！南京！, Nanjing! Nanjing!
2009 (3rd)	(Iran) Asghar Farhadi	About Elly	درباره الی / Darbâreye Eli
2009 (3rd)	(India) Anurag Kashyap	Dev.D	
2009 (3rd)	(Sri Lanka) Vimukthi Jayasundara	Between Two Worlds	Ahasin Wetei
2009 (3rd)	(Japan) Sion Sono	Love Exposure	愛のむきだし / Ai no mukidashi

=== 2010s ===
Year	Winner and nominees	Film	Original title
2010 (4th)	(Korea) Lee Chang-dong	Poetry	시, Shi
2010 (4th)	(Taiwan) Doze Niu	Monga	艋舺;/Báng-kah
2010 (4th)	(Turkey) Semih Kaplanoğlu	Honey	Bal
2010 (4th)	(China) Wang Quan'an	Weaving Girl	纺织姑娘 / fǎng zhī gū niáng
2010 (4th)	(China) Feng Xiaogang	Aftershock	唐山大地震/ Tángshān Dà Dìzhèn
2011 (5th)	(Turkey) Nuri Bilge Ceylan	Once Upon a Time in Anatolia	Bir Zamanlar Anadolu’da,
2011 (5th)	(Russia) Andrey Zvyagintsev	Elena	Елена
2011 (5th)	(Iran) Mohammad Rasoulof	Goodbye	به امید دیدار/ Be omid e didar
2011 (5th)	(Iran) Asghar Farhadi	A Separation	جدایی نادر از سیمین / odaí-e Nadér az Simín
2011 (5th)	(Korea) Na Hong-jin	The Yellow Film	황해; / Hwang hae
2011 (5th)	(China) Jiang Wen	Let the Bullets Fly	让子弹飞; / Ràng Zǐ Dàn Fēi
2012 (6th)	(Philippines) Brillante Mendoza	Thy Womb	Sinapupunan
2012 (6th)	(Turkey) Reis Çelik	Night of Silence	
2012 (6th)	(Iran) Khosro Masoumi	The Bear	Khers
2012 (6th)	(China) Cheng Er	Lethal Hostage	边境风云 / Biānjìng Fēngyún
2012 (6th)	(India) Anurag Kashyap	Gangs of Wasseypur – Part 1	
2013 (7th)	(Singapore) Anthony Chen	Ilo Ilo	爸妈不在家,
2013 (7th)	(Kazakhstan) Emir Baighazin	Harmony Lessons	Асланның сабақтары
2013 (7th)	(Kurdistan Region) Huner Saleem	My Sweet Pepperland	
2013 (7th)	(Japan) Hirokazu Koreeda	Like Father, Like Son	そして父になる / Soshite Chichi ni Naru
2013 (7th)	(Iran) Shahram Mokri	Fish and Cat	ماهی و گربه / Mahi Va Gorbeh
2014 (8th)	(Turkey) Nuri Bilge Ceylan	Winter Sleep	Kış Uykusu,
2014 (8th)	(Australia) Rolf de Heer	Charlie's Country	
2014 (8th)	(Russia) Andrey Zvyagintsev	Leviathan (2014 film)	Левиафан
2014 (8th)	(Korea) Im Kwon-taek	Revivre	화장 / Hwajang
2014 (8th)	(Iran) Rakhshan Bani-E'temad	Tales	قصه‌ها / Ghesse-ha
2015 (9th)	(Russia) Alexey German JR	Under Electric Clouds	Под электрическими облаками / Pod electricheskimi oblakami
2015 (9th)	(Thailand) Apichatpong Weerasethakul	Cemetery of Splendour	รักที่ขอนแก่น / Rak Ti Khon Kaen
2015 (9th)	(Kazakhstan) Yermek Tursunov	Stranger	Жат / Zhat
2015 (9th)	(Taiwan) Hou Hsiao-hsien	The Assassin	刺客聶隱娘 / Nie Yinniang
2015 (9th)	(South Korea) Park Jungbum	Alive	산다 / Sanda
2016 (10th)	(China) Feng Xiaogang	I Am Not Madam Bovary	我不是潘金莲 / Wo Bu Shi Pan Jinlian
2016 (10th)	(India) Anurag Kashyap	Psycho Raman	Raman Raghav 2.0
2016 (10th)	(China) Bi Gan	Kaili Blues	路边野餐 / Lu Bian Ye Can
2016 (10th)	(Korea) Lee Joon-Ik	The Throne	사도 / Sado
2016 (10th)	(Turkey) Zeki Demirkubuz	Ember	Kor
2017 (11th)	(Russia) Andrey Zvyagintsev	Loveless	Nelyubov
2017 (11th)	(Georgia (country)) Ana Urushadze	Scary Mother	Sashishi Deda
2017 (11th)	(Japan) Kore-eda Hirokazu	The Third Murder	Sandome no Satsujin
2017 (11th)	(Indonesia) Mouly Surya	Marlina the Murderer in Four Acts	Marlina si Pembunuh dalam Empat Babak
2017 (11th)	(India) Sanal Kumar Sasidharan	Sexy Durga	
2018 (12th)	(Lebanon) Nadine Labaki	Capharnaüm	
2018 (12th)	(Australia) Bruce Beresford	Ladies in Black	
2018 (12th)	(Kazakhstan) Emir Baigazin	The River	Ózen
2018 (12th)	(Japan) Kore-eda Hirokazu	Shoplifters	万引き家族 / Manbiki Kazoku
2018 (12th)	(India) Ivan Ayr	Soni	
2019 (13th)	(Kazakhstan) Adilkhan Yerzhanov	A Dark, Dark Man	
2019 (13th)	(Philippines) Lav Diaz	The Halt	Ang Hupa
2019 (13th)	(Palestine) Elia Suleiman	It Must Be Heaven	
2019 (13th)	(Thailand) (United Kingdom) Anocha Suwichakornpong, Ben Rivers	Krabi, 2562	
2019 (13th)	(China) Wang Xiaoshuai	So Long, My Son	地久天长

=== 2020s ===
Year	Winner and nominees	Film	Original title
2021 (14th)	(Iran) (France) Asghar Farhadi	A Hero	قهرمان,
2021 (14th)	(Georgia (country)) (France) Dea Kulumbegashvili	Beginning	დასაწყისი
2021 (14th)	(Japan) Ryusuke Hamaguchi	Drive My Car	ドライブ・マイ・カー
2021 (14th)	(India) P. S. Vinothraj	Pebbles	Koozhangal
2021 (14th)	(Indonesia) Kamila Andini	Yuni	
2022 (15th)	(Cambodia) (France) Davy Chou	Return to Seoul	Retour à Séoul
2022 (15th)	(Indonesia) Kamila Andini	Before, Now & Then	Nana
2022 (15th)	(Philippines) Lav Diaz	When the Waves Are Gone	Kapag Wala Nang Mga Alon
2022 (15th)	(Syria) Ameer Fakher Eldin	The Stranger	الغريب
2022 (15th)	(South Korea) Shin Su-won	Hommage	오마주
2023 (16th)	(Canada) Celine Song	Past Lives	
2023 (16th)	(Kazakhstan) Darkhan Tulegenov	Brothers	Братья
2023 (16th)	(China) Liang Ming	Carefree Days	逍遥·游
2023 (16th)	(India) Rima Das	Tora's Husband	
2023 (16th)	(Japan) Ryusuke Hamaguchi	Evil Does Not Exist	悪は存在しない
2024 (17th)	(Georgia (country)) Tato Kotetishvili	Holy Electricity	
2024 (17th)	(India) Payal Kapadia	All We Imagine as Light	പ്രഭയായ് നിനച്ചതെല്ലാം
2024 (17th)	(Georgia (country)) (France) Dea Kulumbegashvili	April	აპრილი
2024 (17th)	(Cambodia) (France) Rithy Panh	Meeting with Pol Pot	ណាត់ជួបជាមួយ ប៉ុល ពត
2024 (17th)	(China) Jiang Xiaoxuan	To Kill a Mongolian Horse	一匹白馬的熱夢
2025 (18th)	(Iran) Jafar Panahi	It Was Just an Accident	یک تصادف ساده
2025 (18th)	(Iran) Amir Azizi	Inside Amir	درون امیر
2025 (18th)	(Japan) Akio Fujimoto	Lost Land	Harà Watan
2025 (18th)	(Indonesia) Garin Nugroho	Samsara	
2025 (18th)	(Mongolia) Sengedorj Janchivdorj	Silent City Driver	Чимээгүй хотын жолооч
2026 (19th)	(Thailand) Sompot Chidgasornpongse	9 Temples to Heaven	9 วัด สู่สวรรค์
2026 (19th)	(Myanmar) Aung Phyoe (Special Mention)	Fruit Gathering	သစ်သီးခူး
2026 (19th)	(Nepal) Abinash Bikram Shah	Elephants in the Fog	तिनीहरू
2026 (19th)	(Australia) Jennifer Peedom	Tenzing	
2026 (19th)	(Japan) Ryusuke Hamaguchi	All of a Sudden	急に具合が悪くなる
