= Abinash Bikram Shah =

Nepalese director, writer and producer

Abinash Bikram Shah (Nepali: अविनाश बिक्रम शाह) is a Nepalese director, writer and producer. In 2022, his short film Lori (Melancholy of my Mother's Lullabies) was selected to compete for Short Film Palme d'Or at 2022 Cannes Film Festival, and won Special Jury Mention, making him the first Nepali filmmaker to be officially selected for Cannes and win an award.

In 2026, his debut feature film Elephants in the Fog made history as the first Nepali feature film officially selected for the Cannes Film Festival. Premiering in the Un Certain Regard section, it went on to win the section's Jury Prize. It was also nominated for the Camera d'Or and Queer Palm.

== Filmography ==
=== Feature films ===
- Elephants in the Fog (2026)

==== As writer ====
- Highway (2012)
- Kalo Pothi: The Black Hen (2015)
- Shambhala (2024)

=== Short films ===
- I am Happy (2013)
- Tattini: The Moon is Bright Tonight (2018)
- Lori: Melancholy of my Mother's Lullabies (2022)

== Accolades ==
Award	Date of ceremony	Category	Recipient(s)	Result	Ref.
Cannes Film Festival	22 May 2026	Un Certain Regard Award: Jury Prize	Elephants in the Fog	Won	
Cannes Film Festival	22 May 2026	Caméra d'Or	Elephants in the Fog	Nominated	
Cannes Film Festival	22 May 2026	Queer Palm	Elephants in the Fog	Nominated	
Asia Pacific Screen Awards	30 October 2026	Best Film	Elephants in the Fog	Pending	
Asia Pacific Screen Awards	30 October 2026	Best Director	Elephants in the Fog	Pending	

=== Honors ===
- 2026: In October 2026, Bikram Shah served as a member of the Sonje Award Jury at the 31st Busan International Film Festival.
