= Elephants in the Fog =

2026 thriller film by Abinash Bikram Shah

- Nepalese promotional poster
- Nepali: तिनीहरू
- Directed by: Abinash Bikram Shah
- Screenplay by: Abinash Bikram Shah
- Story by: Abinash Bikram Shah; Sandeep Badal
- Produced by: Anup Poudel; Justin Pechberty; Damien Megherbi; Michael Henrichs
- Starring: Pushpa Thing Lama; Deepika Yadav; Jasmin Bishwokarma; Aliz Ghimire; Dura Sanjay Kumar Gupta
- Cinematography: Noé Bach
- Edited by: Andrew Bird; Paris J. Ludwig
- Music by: Frédéric Alvarez
- Production companies: Underground Talkies Nepal; Les Valseurs; Die Gesellschaft; Zischlermann Filmproduktion; Enquadramento Produções; Bubbles Project; Storm Films
- Distributed by: Arizona Distribution (France); The Tea Folks Films (Nepal); missingFILMs (Germany); Imovision (Brazil)
- Release dates: 20 May 2026 (Cannes); 4 September 2026 (Nepal); 23 September 2026 (France)
- Running time: 103 minutes
- Countries: Nepal; France; Germany; Brazil; Norway
- Languages: Nepali, Bhojpuri

Elephants in the Fog (Nepali: तिनीहरू, romanized: Tinīharū) is a 2026 thriller film written and directed by Abinash Bikram Shah, in his directorial debut. Starring Pushpa Thing Lama, Deepika Yadav, Jasmin Bishwokarma, Aliz Ghimire, and Dura Sanjay Kumar Gupta, it follows the matriarch of a Kinnar household in a village in southern Nepal who searches for her adopted daughter after she disappears.

The film had its world premiere in the Un Certain Regard section of the 2026 Cannes Film Festival on 20 May, where it won the section's Jury Prize. It was theatrically released in Nepal on 4 September. It was also selected as the Nepalese entry for Best International Feature Film at the 99th Academy Awards. It went on to win awards at festivals including the NZIFF, BKKIFF, NewFest, Thessaloniki International Film Festival, and Taipei Golden Horse Film Festival, and Lama won Best Performance at the Asia Pacific Screen Awards.

== Premise ==
In a village in Thori, on the edge of a forest where villagers carry torches at night to drive away wild elephants, Pirati is the matriarch of a house within a Kinnar community. The Kinnar live apart from the village but are called on to bless weddings and births, and members take vows of chastity and obedience to their guru. Despite her vow, Pirati is secretly in love with Jungey, the drummer who plays at the community's ceremonies, and plans to leave with him for New Delhi.

Pirati has recently adopted Apsara, a former sex worker who resents the community's strict rules. When Apsara disappears after a quarrel with Pirati, and her wig is found in the forest, the police show little interest. Pirati begins her own search, which brings her into conflict with the villagers, as men from the village come under suspicion, and with a Kinnar hierarchy that would expel her if her relationship were discovered.

== Cast ==
- Pushpa Thing Lama as Pirati
- Aliz Ghimire as Apsara
- Deepika Yadav as Joon
- Jasmin Bishwokarma as Chameli
- Aashant Sharma as Master
- Sanjay Gupta as MJ
- Umesha Pandey as Guru Mata
- Meera Gurung as Sweety
- Akanchha Karki as Inspector Shova
- Maotse Gurung as Gurung Dai
- Gauri Malla as DSP Drishti

== Production ==
Shah conceived the film during the COVID-19 lockdowns. After watching TikTok videos posted by Kinnar women, he was struck that they kept posting joyful videos despite hostile comments, and was drawn to the community's tradition of chosen families. The script took almost five years to write: Shah visited Kinnar communities across Nepal before writing, and developed the story through those meetings.

Elephants in the Fog is an international co-production of Nepal, France, Germany, Brazil, and Norway. In October 2021, the project was selected to participate at the Asian Project Market, held during the 26th Busan International Film Festival. It won the Pop Up Film Residency Award. In November 2021, it received a €10,000 development grant from the Hubert Bals Fund. In April 2022, Shah participated in the Film Independent's Global Media Makers residency to develop the screenplay. He also developed the script at the 2022 Oxbelly Lab. In May 2022, the project was also presented at the La Fabrique Cinéma de l'Institut Français during the Cannes Film Festival. Shah also participated at the 2023 Sundance Screenwriters' Lab.

It participated at the Venice Gap-Financing Market in July 2023. In August 2023, the project received a €40,000 production grant from the World Cinema Fund. In September 2025, it participated at the European Work in Progress, where it received a €30,000 post-production grant.

=== Casting ===
Shah cast members of the Kinnar community, as he had done with non-professional actors in his short films, saying it was important to him as an outsider to the community. Most of the cast had never acted before. Shah met Pushpa Thing Lama, an LGBTQ rights activist who had worked with the Blue Diamond Society since 2006, at a community function before he had finished the screenplay, and later called it "love at first sight". He first worked with her on a short practice scene at the Sundance directing lab. In rehearsals, Lama initially played in the heightened style of Nepali and Indian television serials, and Shah worked with her for almost two years to bring her towards a more restrained performance. He described the turning point as Lama coming to see the role as her own story and that of most trans women in Nepal.

=== Filming and post-production ===
The film was shot over 35 days. Cinematographer Noé Bach drew on Nan Goldin's photography of the 1980s and 1990s, creating images that felt found, and avoiding a staged look. The film was edited by Andrew Bird and Paris J. Ludwig, a trans woman whose perspective Shah considered essential to the material. Frédéric Alvarez's score combines traditional Nepali sounds with more modern, fractured elements to follow Pirati's inner journey.

== Release ==
Elephants in the Fog had its world premiere in the Un Certain Regard section of the 2026 Cannes Film Festival on 20 May 2026, where it received an eight-minute standing ovation. Ahead of the premiere, Best Friend Forever acquired the film's international sales rights.

Following Cannes, the film screened in the Horizons section of the Karlovy Vary International Film Festival, and at festivals including the Melbourne International Film Festival, the Toronto International Film Festival, the Busan International Film Festival and Filmfest Hamburg. It was shown in the Thrill strand of the 2026 BFI London Film Festival, opened the 41st MIX Copenhagen LGBTQ+ Film Festival on 30 October 2026, and screened at the 67th Thessaloniki International Film Festival.

The film premiered in Nepal on 2 September 2026 with a fundraising screening for flood relief, and opened in cinemas across the country on 4 September. It was released in France by Arizona Distribution on 23 September 2026 under the title Les Éléphants dans la brume.

Distributors include Arizona Distribution and Les Valseurs Distribution in France, missingFILMs in Germany and Austria, Imovision in Brazil and The Tea Folks Films in Nepal. Further deals placed the film with MetFilm Distribution in the United Kingdom, Filmin in Spain, Vedette in the Benelux, Trigon in Switzerland, Lev Cinema in Israel, Jayantii in Australia, EFAR Films in India, PT Falcon in Indonesia and the Film Development Council of the Philippines, as well as an inflight deal with Silk Route.

=== Box office ===
In France, the film sold 28,390 tickets in its first week of release. As of 28 October 2026, it had recorded 80,574 admissions after five weeks.

== Reception ==
=== Critical response ===
On the review aggregator website Rotten Tomatoes, the film holds an approval rating of 93% based on 15 reviews, with an average rating of 7.3/10.

Sushil Poudel of eKantipur praised the film's themes, acting, and cinematography, describing it as "an unforgettable artistic and social document." Writing for Screen Daily, Namrata Joshi called the film "an emphatic assertion of identity, resilience, rebellion and empowerment". Siddhant Adlakha of Variety called the film “gentle, fierce, and full of life and contradictions” and praised Pushpa Thing Lama’s “stunning first-time performance”. Writing for RogerEbert.com, Isaac Feldberg described it as a “beautiful, mysterious, and emotionally captivating debut” and called Lama’s lead performance “extraordinarily moving”. For the BFI, B. Ruby Rich called it “a powerful, beautiful and rich film”.

=== Impact ===
The film's success was described in Nepal as a milestone for the country's queer cinema and for the Kinnar community. During the Cannes premiere, Nepal's Minister of Information and Communication, Bikram Timilsina, congratulated the filmmakers on social media, saying the film had helped establish Nepali cinema on the international stage; Kathmandu's acting mayor, Sunita Dangol, attended the screening. On their return from Cannes, the cast and crew were welcomed at Kathmandu's airport by crowds and government ministers. The matriarch and her adopted daughters are all played by transgender actors; Lama told Foreign Policy: "This is not just a movie, this is our life."

The film has also been used to raise money for disaster relief. Its Nepalese premiere in Kathmandu on 2 September 2026 was a fundraising screening following the 2026 Nepal–Tibet floods, with contributions from guests and the producers deposited in the Prime Minister's Disaster Relief Fund. A preview screening at UGC Les Halles in Paris on 17 September, held under the banner "In Solidarity with Nepal", donated the French distributor's proceeds to a Nepalese government flood relief fund. In October 2026, the Australia–Nepal Parliamentary Friendship Group and the Embassy of Nepal organised a screening at Parliament House in Canberra, reported to be the first of a Nepali film at the venue, with donations going to the Prime Minister's Relief Fund and Australia's Emergency Action Alliance.

=== Accolades ===
Elephants in the Fog won the Un Certain Regard Jury Prize and was nominated for the Caméra d'Or and Queer Palm at the 2026 Cannes Film Festival, where it debuted. The film was selected as the Nepalese entry for the Best International Feature Film at the 99th Academy Awards..

Award	Date of ceremony	Category	Recipient(s)	Result	Ref.
Cannes Film Festival	22 May 2026	Un Certain Regard Jury Prize	Abinash Bikram Shah	Won	
Cannes Film Festival	22 May 2026	Caméra d'Or	Abinash Bikram Shah	Nominated	
Cannes Film Festival	22 May 2026	Queer Palm	Abinash Bikram Shah	Nominated	
Cannes Film Festival	May 2026	Best Sound Creation Award	Elephants in the Fog	Won	
Melbourne International Film Festival	22 August 2026	Bright Horizons Award	Abinash Bikram Shah	Nominated	
New Zealand International Film Festival	August 2026	Best Film	Elephants in the Fog	Won	
New Zealand International Film Festival	August 2026	Audience Award	Elephants in the Fog	Won	
Bangkok International Film Festival	27 September 2026	Best Film	Elephants in the Fog	Won	
Rio Film Festival	11 October 2026	Felix Award	Elephants in the Fog	Honorable Mention	
Chicago International Film Festival	23 October 2026	Gold Q-Hugo – OutLook Competition	Abinash Bikram Shah	Nominated	
NewFest	October 2026	Grand Jury Prize – International Narrative Feature	Elephants in the Fog	Won	
Asia Pacific Screen Awards	30 October 2026	Best Film	Anup Poudel, Justin Pechberty, Michael Henrichs	Nominated	
Asia Pacific Screen Awards	30 October 2026	Best Director	Abinash Bikram Shah	Nominated	
Asia Pacific Screen Awards	30 October 2026	Best Performance	Pushpa Thing Lama	Won	
Singapore International Film Festival	31 October 2026	Best Performance – Asian Feature Film Competition (shared with Putri Marino)	Pushpa Thing Lama	Won	
MIX Copenhagen	November 2026	Lili Award for Best Feature	Elephants in the Fog	Won	
Thessaloniki International Film Festival	15 November 2026	Mermaid Award	Elephants in the Fog	Won	
Taipei Golden Horse Film Festival	18 November 2026	Taiwan Film Critics Society Award	Elephants in the Fog	Won	

== See also ==
- List of submissions to the 99th Academy Awards for Best International Feature Film
- List of Nepalese submissions for the Academy Award for Best International Feature Film
