= The Station (2026 film) =

2026 comedy-drama film by Sara Ishaq

- International promotional poster
- Arabic: المحطّة
- Directed by: Sara Ishaq
- Screenplay by: Sara Ishaq; Nadia Eliewat; Kate Leys
- Produced by: Sol Bondy; Fred Burle; Nadia Eliewat; Gavriil Gordeev; Sergey Shishkin
- Starring: Abeer Mohammed; Amal Ismail; Manal Al-Mulaiki
- Cinematography: Amine Berrada
- Edited by: Romain Namura
- Music by: Tessa Rose Jackson; Darius Timmer
- Production companies: Setara Films; Screen Project; The Imaginarium Films; Georges Films; One Two Films; Keplerfilm; Barentsfilm
- Distributed by: Paradise City Sales
- Release date: 17 May 2026 (Cannes)
- Running time: 100 minutes
- Countries: Yemen; Jordan; France; Germany; Netherlands; Norway; Qatar
- Language: Arabic

The Station (Arabic: المحطّة, romanized: Al Mahatta) is a 2026 comedy-drama film directed by Sara Ishaq in her fiction feature debut, co-written with Nadia Eliewat and Kate Leys, and inspired by real-life events that occurred when Ishaq returned to Yemen in 2015. A co-production of Yemen, Jordan, France, Germany, Netherlands, Norway, and Qatar, it stars Manal Al-Mulaiki, Abeer Mohammed, and Rashad Khaled.

The film had its world premiere in the Critics' Week section of the 79th Cannes Film Festival on 17 May 2026, where it was nominated for the section's Grand Prize and Caméra d'Or.

== Synopsis ==
Through the lives of the women at the petrol station, the film explores survival, family relationships, forgiveness, empathy, and the ways people try to preserve kindness and humanity during conflict.

Set in Yemen during wartime, the film follows Layal, a woman who runs a petrol station that serves only women. She has created the station as a safe and peaceful place away from the violence, with three simple rules: no men, no weapons, and no politics. When Layal’s younger brother is called for military service, she tries to prevent him from being drawn further into the conflict. He dreams of escaping his surroundings and proving himself as a man. To help him, Layal turns to her older sister, with whom she has been estranged for a long time. Their efforts bring the two sisters together again as they confront their past and the difficulties caused by the war.

== Cast ==
- Manal Al-Mulaiki as Layal
- Abeer Mohammed as Shams
- Rashad Khaled as Laith
- Saleh Al-marshahi as Ahmad
- Fariha Hassan as Jamila
- Amal Esmail as Maryam
- Shorooq Mohammed as Um Abdallah
- Randa Mohammed
- Fatima Muthanna

== Production ==
The film won La Biennale di Venezia Prize of €5,000, given to the best film in post-production stage in September 2025.

== Release ==
The Station had its world premiere in the Critics' Week section of the 79th Cannes Film Festival on 17 May 2026. The film was also part of Horizons section of the 60th Karlovy Vary International Film Festival, where it was screened from 5 July to 11 July 2026.

It was presented in the 'Kaleidoscope' section of Filmfest Hamburg on 1 October 2026, and in the 'Journey' section of the 2026 BFI London Film Festival on 8 October 2026.

It will open the revamped Doha Film Festival on 19 November and compete for the best narrative prize.

Paris-based Paradise City Sale acquired world sales rights to the film ahead of its world premiere in Cannes Critics' Week in May 2026.

== Reception ==
=== Accolades ===
Award	Date of ceremony	Category	Recipient(s)	Result	Ref.
Cannes Film Festival	20–23 May 2026	Critics' Week Grand Prize	The Station	Nominated	
Cannes Film Festival	20–23 May 2026	Caméra d'Or	Sara Ishaq	Nominated	
Asia Pacific Screen Awards	30 October 2026	Best Screenplay	Sara Ishaq and Nadia Eliewat	Nominated	
