= Arseni Khachaturan =

Belarusian cinematographer

- Born: March 8, 1993 (age 33); Minsk, Belarus
- Occupation: Cinematographer
- Years active: 2012 - Present

Arseni Khachaturan is a Belarusian cinematographer of Armenian descent based in Los Angeles. He is best known for his work on Beginning (2020), Bones and All (2022), April (2024), and The Drama (2026).

== Life and career ==
Arseni was born and raised in Minsk, Belarus. He briefly studied television and camera operating at the Belarusian State Academy of Arts before dropping out and moving to the United States in 2012.

Arseni early credits include the short film Léthé (2016) and the documentary City of the Sun (2017). He later worked as cinematographer on Eyimofe (2020), Beginning (2020), Bones and All (2022), The Idol (2023), April (2024), and The Drama (2026).

Arseni has also worked on music videos for artists including Miley Cyrus, The Weeknd, Travis Scott, and Talking Heads. In 2026 he was invited to join the American Society of Cinematographers.

== Selected filmography ==
=== Film and television ===
- 2020: Eyimofe
- 2020: Beginning
- 2022: Bones and All
- 2023: The Idol (TV series, 3 episodes)
- 2023: Circus Maximus
- 2024: April
- 2026: The Drama
- TBA: The Chaperones

=== Music video ===
- 2023: The Weeknd, Jennie and Lily-Rose Depp: "One of the Girls"
- 2023: Travis Scott: "Hyaena"
- 2025: Talking Heads: "Psycho Killer"
- 2026: Miley Cyrus: "Let’s Get Married"

== Awards and nominations ==
Year	Result	Award	Category	Work	Ref.
2025	Nominated	Dublin Film Critics Circle Awards	Best Cinematographer	April	
2024	Nominated	Asia Pacific Screen Awards	Best Cinematographer	April	
2023	Nominated	CinEuphoria Awards	Best Cinematography	Bones and All	
2023	Won	Gianni Di Venanzo Award	Best Cinematography	Bones and All	
2022	Nominated	Indiana Film Journalists Association	Best Cinematography	Bones and All	
