= Panopticon (film) =

2024 Georgian drama film

- Promotional poster
- Georgian: პანოპტიკონი
- Directed by: George Sikharulidze
- Screenplay by: George Sikharulidze
- Produced by: Vladimer Kacharava
- Starring: Data Chachua; Malkhaz Abuladze; Ia Sukhitashvili
- Cinematography: Oleg Mutu
- Edited by: Giorgia Villa
- Music by: Chiara Costanza
- Production companies: 20 Steps Productions; FILMO2; Ombre Rosse Film Production; Tangaj Production; Independent Film Project
- Distributed by: The Alchemists
- Release date: 30 June 2024 (KVIFF)
- Running time: 95 minutes
- Countries: Georgia; France; Italy; Romania
- Language: Georgian

Panopticon (Georgian: პანოპტიკონი, romanized: p'anop't'ik'oni) is a 2024 Georgian language drama film written and directed by George Sikharulidze in his feature debut. The film reflects on the uncertain direction of post-Soviet Georgian society, touching upon themes of sexuality, grief, unfulfilled potential, as well as the clash between religious conservatism and nationalism with the realities of the modern world.

The film had its premiere at the 58th Karlovy Vary International Film Festival, where it was nominated for Crystal Globe.

It was selected as the Georgian entry for the Best International Feature Film at the 98th Academy Awards, but it was not nominated.

== Cast ==
- Data Chachua as Sandro
- Malkhaz Abuladze as David
- Ia Sukhitashvili as Natalia
- Vakho Kedeladze as Lasha
- Salome Gelenidze as Tina
- Ketevan Shervashidze as the grandmother
- Maia Gelovani as the mother
- Levan Gabrava as Rati
- Marita Meskhoradze as Lana
- Andro Japaridze as Beka

== Production ==
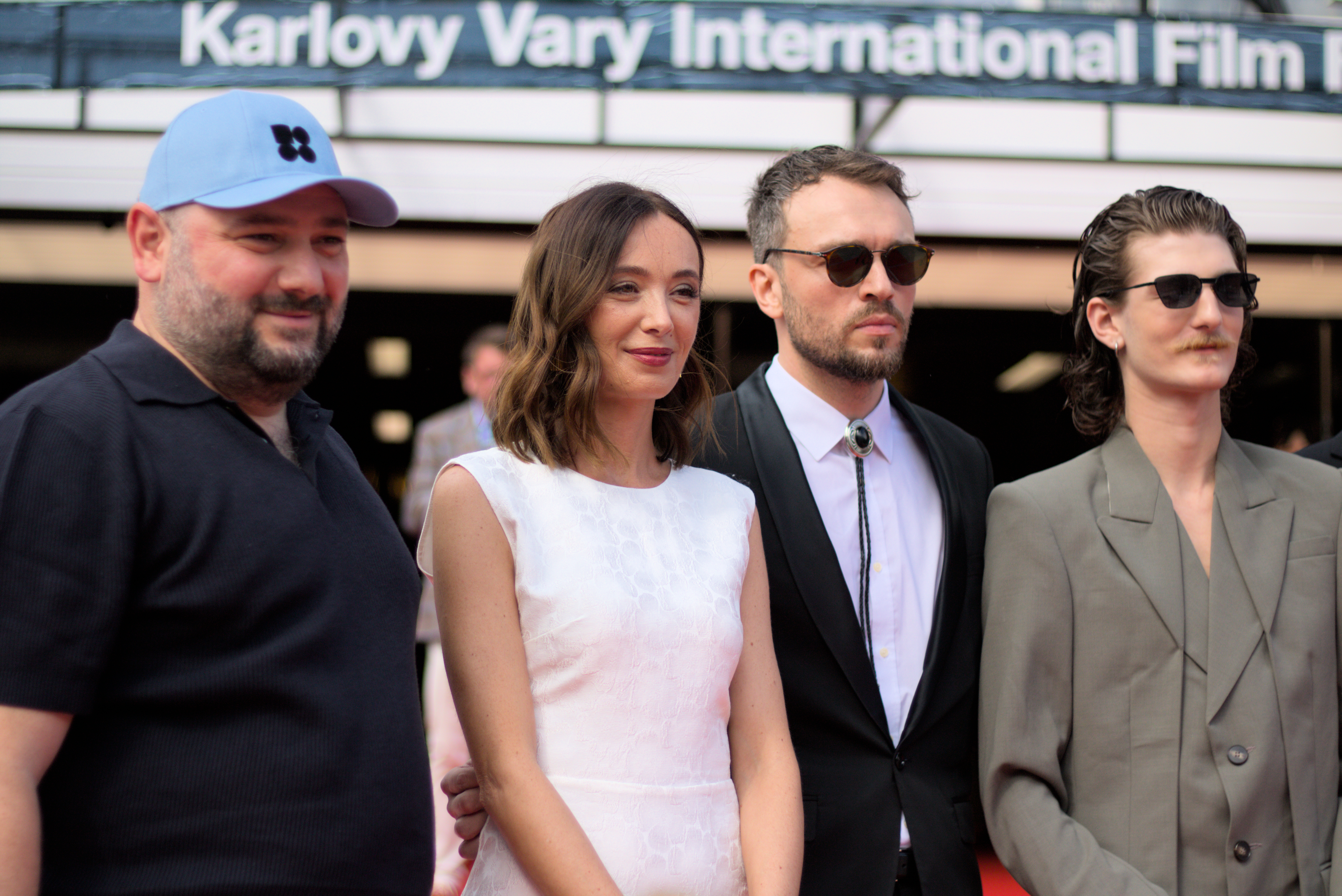
Director George Sikharulidze (centre) with the cast

The film is produced by Vladimer Kacharava and coproduced by Olivier Chantriaux Anamaria Antoci and Luca Cabriolu. It was supported by the Georgian National Film Center with €203,702 in 2021. The film score is composed by Chiara Costanza. Filming took place in Tbilisi in the summer of 2022 till the August 2022.

== Release ==
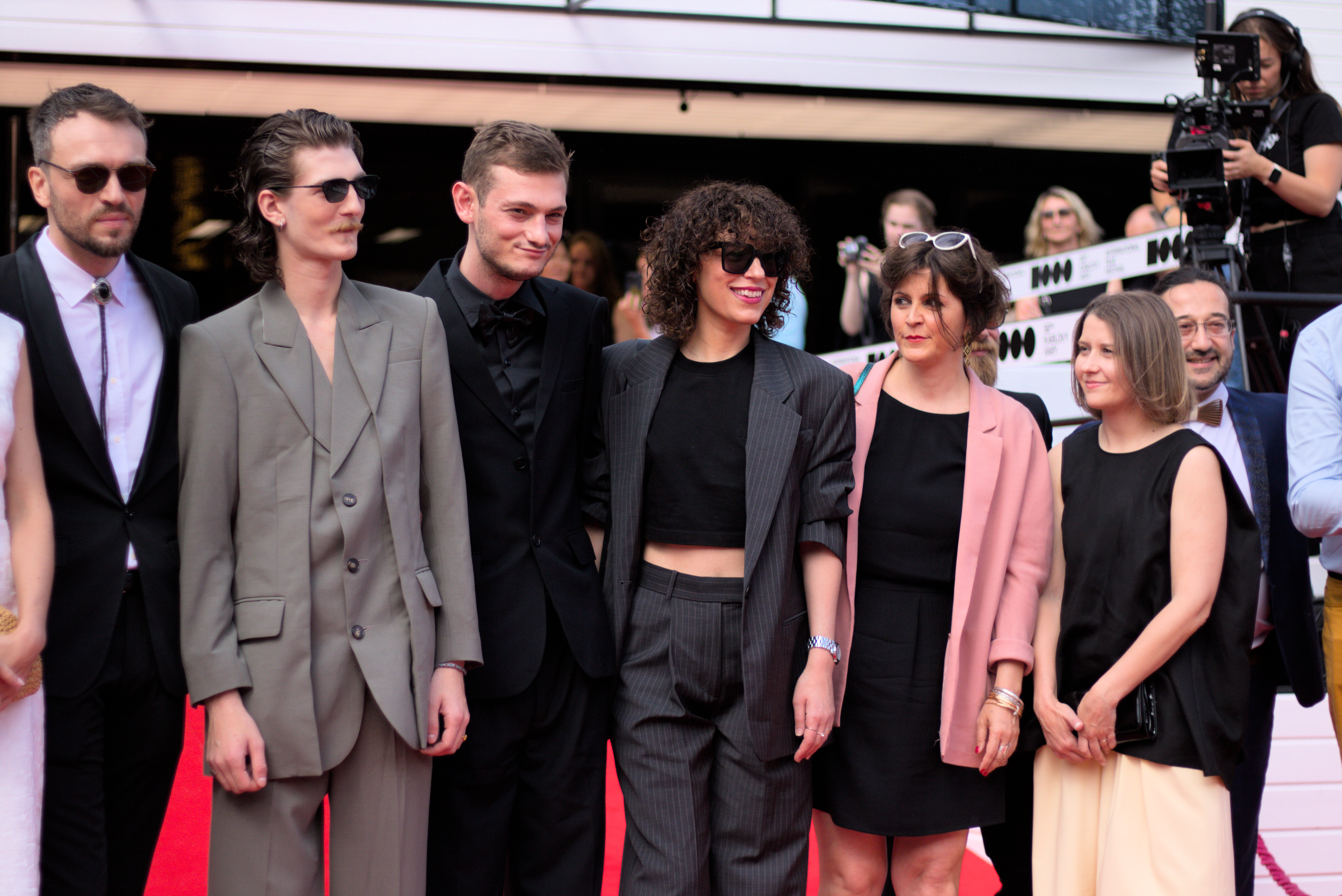
Delegation of the film Panopticon on the red carpet at the 58th Karlovy Vary International Film Festival

Panopticon had its premiere at 58th Karlovy Vary International Film Festival on 30 June 2024, where it competed for Crystal Globe with other eleven feature films. In July 2024, it completed in the Parallels and Encounters section of 31st Palić European Film Festival. It competed for Antigone d'Or at the Montpellier Film Festival, in October 2024.

In November 2024, it competed in Main Competition for the Golden Peacock Award at the 55th International Film Festival of India, and was screened at the 2024 Stockholm International Film Festival in Discovery section, and at the Tallinn Black Nights Film Festival, and at the International Film Festival Mannheim-Heidelberg.

On 16 January 2025, it was screened in the East Side Stories at the Tromsø International Film Festival.

In March 2025 it participated in the Marseille International Music & Cinema Festival and competed for the 2025 Grand Prize for Best Original Score.

On 19 March 2025, it competed in Teen Competition section of the Sofia International Film Festival.

The film was screened at the South East European Film Festival in LA on 30 April 2026.

It was released in French theaters on 24 September 2025 by The Alchemists.

== Reception ==
On the AlloCiné, which lists 17 press reviews, the film obtained an average rating of 3.7/5.

== Accolades ==
Year	Award	Category	Recipient(s)	Result	Ref
2024	Karlovy Vary International Film Festival	Crystal Globe Grand Prix	Panopticon	Nominated	
2024	Karlovy Vary International Film Festival	Commendation of the Ecumenical Jury	Panopticon	Won	
2024	Palić European Film Festival	Best Film	Panopticon	Won	
2024	Montpellier Mediterranean Film Festival	Critics’ Prize	Panopticon	Won	
2024	Asia Pacific Screen Awards	Best New Performance	Data Chachua	Won	

== See also ==
- List of submissions to the 98th Academy Awards for Best International Feature Film
- List of Georgian submissions for the Academy Award for Best International Feature Film
