= April (2024 film) =

Film directed by Dea Kulumbegashvili

- French theatrical release poster
- Georgian: აპრილი
- Directed by: Dea Kulumbegashvili
- Written by: Dea Kulumbegashvili
- Produced by: Ilan Amouyal; Archil Gelovani; Luca Guadagnino; Francesco Melzi d'Eril; Gabriele Bebe Moratti; Alexandra Rossi; David Zerat; Adrien Dassault; Steven Darty
- Starring: Ia Sukhitashvili; Kakha Kintsurashvili; Merab Ninidze
- Cinematography: Arseni Khachaturan
- Edited by: Jacopo Ramella Pajrin
- Music by: Matthew Herbert
- Production companies: First Picture; Frenesy Film Company; Independent Film Project; MeMo Films; Tenderstories
- Distributed by: Pyramide Distribution (France)
- Release dates: September 5, 2024 (Venice); January 29, 2025 (France)
- Running time: 134 minutes
- Countries: Georgia; Italy; France
- Language: Georgian
- Budget: €2 million
- Box office: $61,179

April (Georgian: აპრილი, romanized: ap'rili) is a 2024 drama film written and directed by Dea Kulumbegashvili. It stars Ia Sukhitashvili, Kakha Kintsurashvili and Merab Ninidze.

The film had its world premiere at the 81st Venice International Film Festival, where it won the Special Jury Prize.

== Premise ==
Nina, an obstetrician in rural Georgia who aids patients seeking abortions despite legal prohibition, must defend her values and actions when she is accused of negligence and subject to investigation.

== Cast ==
- Ia Sukhitashvili as Nina
- Kakha Kintsurashvili as David
- Merab Ninidze as the chief physician

== Production ==
Following the success of her first feature film Beginning, Kulumbegashvili was awarded a 2022 Baumi Script Development Award to begin work on her next feature, then titled Historia, about a Georgian obstetrician who provides illegal abortions. That December, Cineuropa reported that filming would commence the following March with financial support from Arte France Cinéma. It was shot by Georgian cinematographer Arseni Khachaturan, who also shot Beginning, on 35mm film.

== Release ==
April was acquired for international sales by Goodfellas, then known as Wild Bunch International. By December 2022, the project was slated for a 2024 release date, though Screen Daily reported in May 2023 that the film was expected to premiere at that year's Cannes Film Festival.

In July 2024, April was announced as a main competition entry at the 81st Venice International Film Festival. It has been selected for the MAMI Mumbai Film Festival 2024 under the World Cinema section.

== Reception ==
=== Critical reception ===
On the review aggregator website Rotten Tomatoes, 95% of 59 critics' reviews are positive. The website's consensus reads: "Directed with unflinching verve by Dea Kulumbegashvili, April is a searing depiction of professional integrity and the visceral realities of childbirth." Metacritic, which uses a weighted average, assigned the film a score of 86 out of 100, based on 18 critics, indicating "universal acclaim".

In June 2025, IndieWire ranked the film at number 53 on its list of "The 100 Best Movies of the 2020s (So Far)."

=== Accolades ===
Award	Ceremony date	Category	Recipient(s)	Result	Ref.
Venice International Film Festival	7 September 2024	Golden Lion	Dea Kulumbegashvili	Nominated	
Venice International Film Festival	7 September 2024	Special Jury Prize	Dea Kulumbegashvili	Won	
San Sebastián International Film Festival	28 September 2024	Zabaltegi-Tabakalera Award	April	Won	
BFI London Film Festival	20 October 2024	Best Film	April	Nominated	
Asia Pacific Screen Awards	30 November 2024	Best Film	April	Won	
Asia Pacific Screen Awards	30 November 2024	Best Director	Dea Kulumbegashvili	Nominated	
Asia Pacific Screen Awards	30 November 2024	Best Screenplay	Dea Kulumbegashvili	Nominated	
Asia Pacific Screen Awards	30 November 2024	Best Performance	Ia Sukhitashvili	Won	
Asia Pacific Screen Awards	30 November 2024	Best Cinematography	Arseni Khachaturan	Nominated	
TOKYO FILMeX	30 November 2024	Grand Prize	April	Won	
European Film Awards	7 December 2024	European University Film Award	Dea Kulumbegashvili	Nominated	
Singapore International Film Festival	8 December 2024	Best Screenplay	Dea Kulumbegashvili	Won	
Vilnius International Film Festival	23 March 2025	Best Film	Dea Kulumbegashvili	Won	
