= To Kill a Mongolian Horse =

2024 film by Jiang Xiaoxuan

- RSIFF release poster
- Traditional Chinese: 一匹白馬的熱夢
- Simplified Chinese: 一匹白马的热梦
- Literal meaning: A white horse's passionate dream
- Hanyu Pinyin: Yī pǐ bái mǎ de rè mèng
- Directed by: Jiang Xiaoxuan
- Screenplay by: Jiang Xiaoxuan
- Produced by: Mo Zhulin
- Starring: Saina; Undus; Qilemuge; Tonggalag; Qinartu
- Cinematography: Tao Kio Qiu
- Edited by: Zhong Zheng
- Music by: Unur
- Production company: Da Huang Pictures
- Distributed by: Pluto Film
- Release date: 1 September 2024 (Venice)
- Running time: 98 minutes
- Countries: Malaysia; Hong Kong; South Korea; Japan; United States
- Languages: Mandarin; Mongolian

To Kill a Mongolian Horse (Chinese: 一匹白馬的熱夢) is a 2024 drama film directed and written by Jiang Xiaoxuan in her feature film debut. Set in Inner Mongolia and produced by Da Huang Pictures, the film is a co-production between Malaysia, Hong Kong, South Korea, Japan, and the United States. It stars Saina, a horseback performer and first-time actor, playing himself, and explores his struggle between adhering to traditions as a horseback performer and embracing contemporary society.

The film had its world premiere in competition for the Giornate degli Autori at the 81st Venice International Film Festival on 1 September 2024. It received two nominations in the 17th Asia Pacific Screen Awards, including a nomination for Best Film.

== Plot ==
Inner Mongolian horseback performer Saina visits his friend and colleague Hasa, who is planning to move to the city, and helps him transport his horses for sale. Upon returning home, Saina's father informs him that the family is running out of money, with debtors coming to collect and electricity outages occurring frequently. The following morning, he goes to the city to meet his son, who is in the custody of his ex-wife Tana. Saina, having grown up with horses and loving horseback riding, tells Tana that he plans to return to work at a rural stable, which greatly displeases her. Tana explains that she struggles to make ends meet, having been asked by her boss to sing Mongolian songs to entertain clients constantly, all because she wants to move to the city for their son's better education. She criticizes Saina for his apparent lack of concern about their financial difficulties.

In the city, Saina performs horseback shows for tourists, portraying a soldier in battle, but only receives meager tips from the audience. After the performance, Hasa informs him that he will be doing his final show before selling all his herds to move to the city for a stable job. However, Hasa falls from his horse and is badly injured before that performance, requiring hospitalization. Needing to sell his sheep to pay the bills, a situation Saina claimed he had never faced even in his worst times, he considers changing careers. He first applies for a job at a mine but receives no response. When he applies to a stable in the city, he is only offered a position as a stable hand, as the stable practices Western equestrian style, which is very different from his Mongolian riding and he has to relearn riding from scratch. With no other options, Saina returns to performing on horseback. However, he gets bitten by a horse while taming one at the performance venue. When he returns home, his father shows little concern for his injury, angering Saina, who blames his father for forcing him to bear heavy financial burdens to cover his gambling debts.

Saina and his father are visited by debt collectors along with a businessman interested in buying their herds to build a tourist spot. The businessman offers a large sum of money but requires them to sell their horses as part of the attraction. Triggered by this, Saina storms out of the house, trying to ride away on his beloved white stallion, leading to a confrontation with his father. Eventually, their property is sold and crowded with tourists, but Saina keeps his stallion. He rides through the town and finds Tana at a restaurant, where she is being forced by her boss to sing Mongolian songs despite being sick. Saina interrupts, grabbing a bottle of wine from their table and leaving. In a drunken state, Saina rides his horse onto the city streets, causing traffic congestion.

== Cast ==
- Saina as Saina, a struggling horseback performer
- Undus as Hasa, Saina's friend
- Qilemuge as Tana, Saina's ex-wife
- Tonggalag as Saina's father
- Qinartu as Old Beggar

== Production ==
=== Development ===
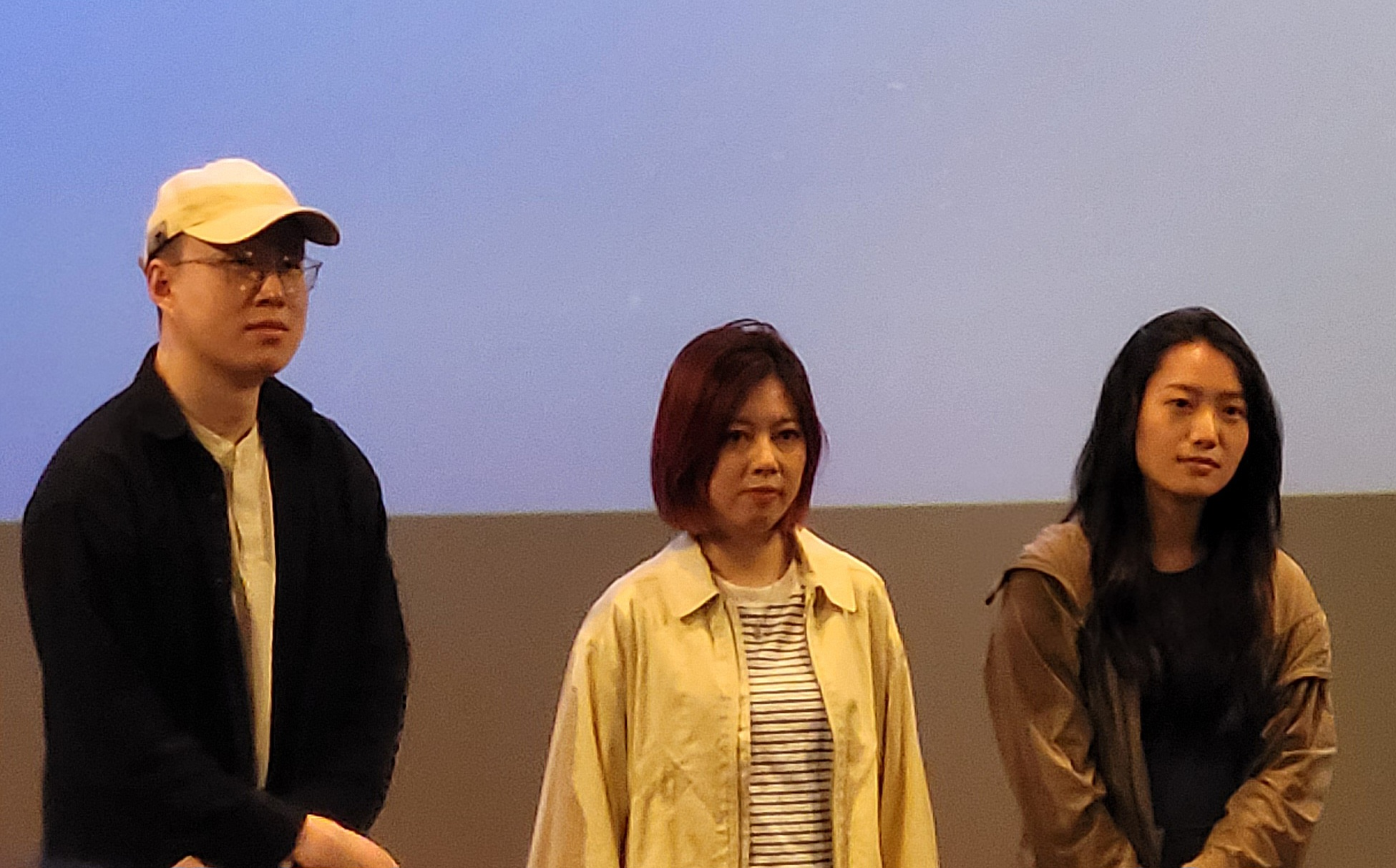
Editor Zhong Zheng (left), producer Mo Zhulin, and director Jiang Xiaoxuan during the post-screening Q&A at the 49th HKIFF

Director Jiang Xiaoxuan grew up in Baotou, Inner Mongolia, where her father was a horse breeder. After graduating from the New York University Tisch School of the Arts, Jiang began working on her debut film, setting it against her upbringing and reflecting on the integral role of horses in Inner Mongolian culture. She was inspired by her friend Saina, a local horseback performer who pursued this career for income, and found both his story and her experiences at the horse fair captivating, where performers celebrated traditional notions of Mongolian masculinity and ethnic identity. She compared the costumes and makeup that the performers donned to heroic figures, likening them to Marvel superheroes putting on their armor. More than half of the story is based on actual events that Jiang witnessed or was told by Saina, who portrayed himself in the film. Jiang noted that the film did not follow a conventional three-act structure; instead, she aimed to document real living conditions, believing that not every action of the characters needed to have a specific meaning or lead to a particular outcome, allowing the audience to experience another person's world.

The film was presented at the Asian Project Market in October 2023, where it won the VIPO Award and the Sørfond Award, as well as at the Hong Kong-Asia Film Financing Forum in March 2024. With a total budget of USD$320,000, Jiang explained that they did not deliberately join many project markets, attending only a few that were convenient in terms of timing, describing the funding they managed to secure as "a matter of luck". The film was produced by Da Huang Pictures as a co-production between Malaysia, Hong Kong, South Korea, Japan, and the United States. While fine-tuning the screenplay, Jiang participated in an online workshop hosted by Malaysian filmmaker Tan Chui Mui, who was impressed with the project and came on board as the film's executive producer. Pre-production and filming took less than a year before the film entered competition at the Venice International Film Festival, with post-production still ongoing when the production team set off for the festival.

=== Filming ===
Principal photography lasted about twenty days, with Tao Kio Qiu serving as the cinematographer, having previously collaborated with Jiang on her short film Graveyard of Horses (2022). Several crew members from Graveyard of Horses also reunited, including editor Zhong Zheng and the sound designer. Most of the shooting took place outdoors, utilizing drones. During the early stages of filming, Saina suffered a fall during a shoot, but it did not hinder his participation, and the scene was retained in the film, which Jiang described as "a defining moment" that "[enriches] the film's emotional landscape". Jiang identified a scene shot during a significant snowstorm as the most challenging, as the temperature was so low that even Saina, who was born and raised in the region, struggled to endure it.

The film features six horseback performance scenes intertwined with the dramatic narrative, with Jiang noting that these scenes serve both to demonstrate horsemanship skills and to advance the story. She views horseback performances as an art form that can resonate with audiences and aimed to convey subjective emotions, rather than presenting them objectively or anthropologically. All horseback performance scenes were planned by Jiang and Qiu in advance using storyboards, but the placement of these scenes within the film underwent many adjustments during post-production, as the crew found the story was not particularly linear, allowing for various possibilities to incorporate the horseback performances.

== Release ==
To Kill a Mongolian Horse had its world premiere in competition for the Giornate degli Autori at the 81st Venice International Film Festival on 1 September 2024. Distribution rights were acquired by Pluto Film prior to its Venice premiere. It was subsequently screened at the 24th Belfast Film Festival, the 29th Busan International Film Festival, the 2024 Red Sea International Film Festival, the 36th Palm Springs International Film Festival, and the 20th Osaka Asian Film Festival. The film also competed for the Golden Cyclo at the 31st Vesoul International Film Festival of Asian Cinema, where it received a special mention from the jury, for the Firebird Award at the 49th Hong Kong International Film Festival, and in the New Directors Competition at the 2025 Seattle International Film Festival.

== Reception ==
Allan Hunter of Screen International described To Kill a Mongolian Horse as an "elegiac first feature" that is "immersed in the testing landscapes and traditions of Mongolia", exploring the struggles of a herdsman against a changing world through Jiang Xiaoxuan's "assured" storytelling and cinematographer Tao Kio Qiu's "vibrant spectacle". Matthew Joseph Jenner of the International Cinephile Society gave the film 4/5 stars, also describing it as an "impressive" directorial debut that "combine traits of the traditional Western with more contemporary sensibilities" and presenting "a compelling and distinctly honest depiction of masculinity". Gautaman Bhaskaran of Arab News praised the storytelling as "gripping" and the "[p]ressing concerns like climate change and drought compensate for average performances".

== Awards and nominations ==
Year	Award	Category	Nominee	Result	Ref.
2024	81st Venice International Film Festival	Giornate degli Autori	—N/a	Nominated	
2024	81st Venice International Film Festival	Authors Under 40 Award: Best Directing and Screenwriting	Jiang Xiaoxuan	Won	
2024	17th Asia Pacific Screen Awards	Best Film	—N/a	Nominated	
2024	17th Asia Pacific Screen Awards	Best Director	Jiang Xiaoxuan	Nominated	
2025	31st Vesoul International Film Festival of Asian Cinema	Golden Cyclo	—N/a	Special Mention	
2025	49th Hong Kong International Film Festival	Firebird Awards (Chinese-language)	—N/a	Won	
2025	2025 Seattle International Film Festival	New Directors Competition	—N/a	Nominated	
