= The Drama (film) =

2026 film by Kristoffer Borgli

- Theatrical release poster
- Directed by: Kristoffer Borgli
- Written by: Kristoffer Borgli
- Produced by: Lars Knudsen; Ari Aster; Tyler Campellone
- Starring: Zendaya; Robert Pattinson
- Cinematography: Arseni Khachaturan
- Edited by: Joshua Raymond Lee; Kristoffer Borgli
- Music by: Daniel Pemberton
- Production company: Square Peg
- Distributed by: A24
- Release dates: March 17, 2026 (Los Angeles); April 3, 2026 (United States)
- Running time: 105 minutes
- Country: United States
- Language: English
- Budget: $28 million
- Box office: $135 million

The Drama is a 2026 American romantic dark comedy film written and directed by Kristoffer Borgli. It stars Zendaya and Robert Pattinson as a happily engaged couple whose relationship is tested by an unexpected revelation the week before their wedding.

The Drama premiered on March 17, 2026, in Los Angeles and was released in the United States by A24 on April 3. The film received generally positive reviews from critics and grossed $135 million worldwide on a $28 million budget becoming a box office success.

== Plot ==
At a Boston café, Charlie Thompson approaches Emma Harwood while she is reading, pretending to have read the same book. Emma seems to ignore him, so he returns to his seat and later apologizes for his approach. Emma then explains that she is deaf in one ear and did not hear him and invites Charlie to retry his approach, leading to a date.

Two years later, Emma and Charlie are due to be married in a week. They see their wedding DJ, Pauline, smoking heroin in a public park. While discussing whether to fire her with Mike and Rachel, their best man and matron of honor, Emma argues that everyone has done bad things, prompting the group to confess their worst actions: Mike admits he used an ex-girlfriend as a human shield during a dog attack and Rachel confesses to locking her "slow" childhood neighbor in an abandoned trailer overnight. Charlie is pressured to share that he relentlessly cyberbullied a classmate who later moved away. Emma reveals she planned a school shooting as a teenager and that her deafness, which she claimed was congenital, was caused by firing a practice rifle close to her ear. The confession horrifies the group, especially Rachel, whose cousin Samantha was paralyzed in a shooting.

Charlie starts questioning how well he knows Emma. When pressed, Emma explains that she planned the shooting while depressed and bullied, and had been drawn to online communities focused on gun violence. She abandoned the plan after seeing how a mass shooting harmed her community and turned to gun control advocacy, finding friends and purpose among the activists. They awkwardly continue wedding preparations under growing strain. Emma begins having shooting-related nightmares, while Charlie grows paranoid about her mental state and fixates on violent imagery.

Rachel repeatedly ignores Emma, refusing to communicate regarding a project Emma's office hired her for. When Emma inadvertently suggests to her boss that Rachel be removed from the project, Rachel ends their friendship and refuses to attend the wedding. Charlie persuades her to reconsider, defending Emma in part by lying — claiming Emma witnessed a close friend's car crash as a child. He then awkwardly approaches Samantha, and assures her that she "would love Emma".

At work, Charlie asks his co-worker Misha how she would react if her boyfriend, Blake, planned a school shooting. When Misha says she would call the police, Charlie breaks down. As Misha attempts to comfort him, they kiss; she offers herself to him, but he stops before they have sex and they agree not to tell their partners about the incident. Later, Charlie and Emma have a tense meeting to fire Pauline, during which Charlie remains stressed by his encounter with Misha.

At the wedding reception, a drunken Rachel delivers a passive-aggressive speech, deriding Emma for dishonesty and Charlie for marrying her, heightening Emma's anxiety. In the bathroom, Emma overhears Misha mentioning someone planning a school shooting. Misinterpreting this as gossip about her, Emma confronts Misha; Misha, assuming Emma is referring to her sexual encounter with Charlie, blames Charlie for kissing her. Charlie gives a disastrous speech, apologizing for cheating and assuring guests Emma "didn't do anything". Misha lies and tells Blake that Charlie sexually harassed her. Blake attacks Charlie, and Emma leaves.

A bloodied Charlie frantically searches for Emma; he eventually travels to their favorite diner, where Emma had previously suggested they go after the wedding. Emma soon arrives, and they reintroduce themselves as if meeting for the first time, smiling tearfully at one another.

== Cast ==
- Zendaya as Emma Harwood, a literary editor from Baton Rouge, Louisiana
  - Jordyn Curet as young Emma
- Robert Pattinson as Charlie Thompson, a British head curator at Cambridge Art Museum and Emma's fiancé
- Alana Haim as Rachel, Emma's maid of honor
- Mamoudou Athie as Mike, Charlie's best man and Rachel's husband
- Hailey Benton Gates as Misha, Charlie's co-worker
- Sydney Lemmon as Pauline, a DJ and former musician hired by Emma and Charlie for their wedding
- Hannah Gross as Alice, Emma and Rachel's boss
- Anna Baryshnikov as Sam, a partially paralyzed mass shooting survivor and Rachel's cousin
- Michael Abbott Jr. as Blake, Misha's current boyfriend
- Zoë Winters as Frances, the wedding photographer
- Damon Gupton as Roger, Emma's father
- Jeremy Levick as Ivan, the DJ hired to replace Pauline

== Production ==
=== Development ===
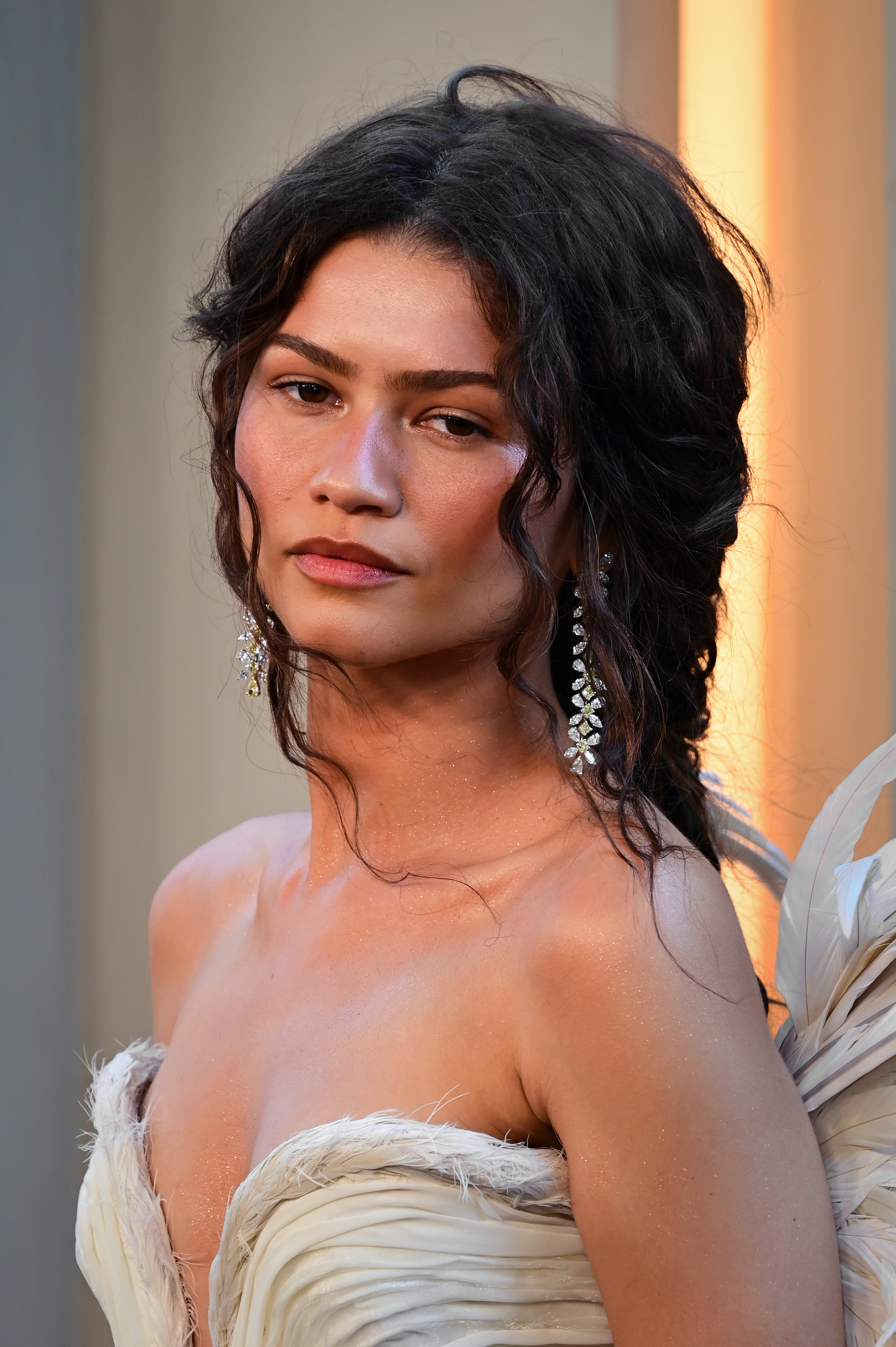
Leads Zendaya and Robert Pattinson

In August 2024, Deadline reported that Kristoffer Borgli would be responsible for writing and directing The Drama for A24. Ari Aster, Lars Knudsen, and Tyler Campellone were set to produce it under their Square Peg studio, with Zendaya and Robert Pattinson in early negotiations to star. In October 2024, Mamoudou Athie and Alana Haim joined the cast.

=== Filming ===
Principal photography began on October 21, 2024, in the United Kingdom. On November 6, Zendaya and Pattinson filmed scenes in the Boston neighborhood of Back Bay and Beacon Street. Charlie and Emma's meet-cute was filmed at Tatte Bakery near John Hancock Tower in Boston. Scenes for Charlie and Emma's apartment were filmed at 43 Union Park in Boston. Borgli chose the location due to its spiral staircase, floor-to-ceiling bookshelves, and ornate period-specific molding and decorative detailing. Wine tasting and wedding scenes were filmed at the Turner Hill Golf Club in Ipswich. The Addison Gallery of American Art in Andover, Massachusetts, was used as the fictional Cambridge Art Museum.

Additional filming took place in New York City and Los Angeles. The production also spent $2.9 million shooting in New Orleans, Louisiana. Most scenes featuring a young Emma were shot on location at Riverdale High School in Jefferson Parish, part of the Greater New Orleans area. Filming wrapped in February 2025.

Belarusian cinematographer Arseni Khachaturan served as director of photography on The Drama, shooting it on 35 mm film. Kodak's Vision3 500T 5219 film stock was used. Khachaturan used the Panavision Millennium XL2 camera fitted with Panavision PVintage lenses to shoot The Drama. The use of long lenses enabled Khachaturan to photograph tight shots and portraits of the characters.

=== Costume design ===
Intending Charlie and Emma to look like "a cohesive unit", costume designer Katina Danabassis chose unisex flannels and interchangeable basics for both to wear. She found some basics from a thrift store that gave a more lived-in look to loungewear. As the film is set in Boston, Danabassis chose Ivy League–inspired clothing for Charlie, including Margaret Howell and vintage Gap pieces. Emma's clothing reflects her character with simple, comfort-focused pieces, often oversized like they could have been borrowed from Charlie. Having previously worked with Zendaya on Euphoria, Danabassis called her "possibly the easiest person to dress".

Informed by the Patti Bellantoni film criticism book If It's Purple, Someone's Gonna Die, Emma's color palette reflected the character's mental state. For example, a green sweater during her meet-cute with Charlie "symbolize[d] that there's some type of mental instability there", according to Danabassis. Danabassis chose a Lawrence traditional bridal gown by Jenny Yoo out of eight or nine options to be Emma's wedding dress. Four identical versions of the dress were produced for the film's action-heavy third act.

=== Music ===
Daniel Pemberton composed the film's score. The Drama also includes tracks from Alicia Keys, John Carroll Kirby, Jordan Raf, Ben Leach, Zach Galsky, Sally Oldfield, Judee Sill, Skinny Pimp, Lady B, Nolan Strong & The Diablos, Smerz, Juliette Gréco, Jackie Gleason, Moondog, Sibylle Baier, Todd Terje, Katie Fash, Shira Small, White Light, Mackeeper, Elusin, and Fakethias and prominently features Jesse Rae's song "Inside Out".

== Release ==
=== Theatrical ===
The Drama premiered at the DGA Theater Complex in Los Angeles on March 17, 2026. The film was released in the United States on April 3, 2026.

=== Home media ===
The film was released on VOD on May 5, 2026. It was released on Blu-ray and 4K UHD by A24 on July 7, 2026. It began streaming on HBO Max on July 31, 2026.

=== Marketing ===
On December 8, 2025, editors of The Boston Globe's Living/Arts team received a request from A24 to hold their daily TV Critic's Corner column so an advertisement could run next to the newspaper's romance advice column, Love Letters. A mock engagement announcement for The Drama was published the following day, which revealed plot details and character information.

== Reception ==
=== Box office ===
The Drama grossed $48.1 million in the United States and Canada, and $84.4 million in other territories, for a worldwide total of $132.5 million.

In the United States and Canada, The Drama was released alongside The Super Mario Galaxy Movie and was projected to gross $12–15 million from 3,151 theaters in its opening weekend. It made $6.3 million on its first day and went on to debut to $14.3 million, finishing in third. In its second weekend, the film grossed $8.7 million (a drop of 39.4%), remaining in third. The film crossed $100 million worldwide on April 22, becoming the fifth film in A24's history to do so.

=== Critical response ===
On the review aggregator website Rotten Tomatoes, 76% of 302 critics' reviews are positive, with an average rating of 7.1/10. The website's consensus reads: "Flirting with complex themes, The Drama walks a tonal tightrope with impressive poise thanks to career-highlight performances by Robert Pattinson and Zendaya." Metacritic, which uses a weighted average, assigned the film a score of 59 out of 100, based on 52 critics, indicating "mixed or average" reviews. Audiences polled by CinemaScore gave the film an average grade of "B" on an A+ to F scale.

William Bibbiani of TheWrap praised the film's performances and tonal ambition, noting its blend of psychological horror and uneasy comedy, though he found the reveal about Zendaya's character deliberately unsettling and difficult to fully enjoy. G. Allen Johnson of the San Francisco Chronicle highlighted the film's focus on empathy and character reactions, singling out Zendaya's layered performance as the emotional core of the story. By contrast, writing for the British Film Institute magazine Sight & Sound, Kate Stables notes that "the rapidly unravelling Charlie [Pattinson] in a succession of ghastly pre-wedding stresses... places his character rather than Emma’s [Zendeya] at the film’s centre", and that rising to the role, Pattinson "is marvellous here as a wavering coward who can’t quit Emma or quit blaming her". Joey Magidson of Awards Radar commended the cast, particularly Zendaya, but criticized the screenplay for lacking development and momentum, ultimately concluding that the film falls short of its potential despite strong individual elements. Nikki Gemmell in The Australian praised the actors, but called the script dishonest and repulsive; she gave it 1 out of 5 stars. Pete Hammond writing for Deadline called the film "brilliantly constructed and fascinating journey" and highlighting that Pattinson gave his "career best performance". Stephanie Zacharek from Time had a mixed response to the film but called Pattinson a "perceptive, subtle actor", who "does everything the movie asks of him, whatever that might be".

The film garnered criticism for its depiction of school shootings. Odie Henderson of The Boston Globe awarded the film 0 out of 4 stars, calling it "repugnant [and] tasteless". March for Our Lives, an association led by survivors of the Parkland high school shooting, criticized the marketing for the film, which they characterized as "misleading". Tom Mauser, the father of a victim of the Columbine High School shooting also criticized the film, saying it "humanized" school shooters. A24 did not reveal the twist prior to the film's release and instructed journalists not to mention it.

=== Accolades ===
Award	Date of ceremony	Category	Nominee(s)	Result	Ref.
Astra Midseason Movie Awards	June 30, 2026	Best Picture	The Drama	Nominated	
Astra Midseason Movie Awards	June 30, 2026	Best Actor	Robert Pattinson	Nominated	
Astra Midseason Movie Awards	June 30, 2026	Best Actress	Zendaya	Nominated	
Astra Midseason Movie Awards	June 30, 2026	Best Screenplay	Kristoffer Borgli	Nominated	
National Film Awards	July 1, 2026	Best International Film	The Drama	Nominated	
National Film Awards	July 1, 2026	Best Actor	Robert Pattinson	Nominated	
National Film Awards	July 1, 2026	Best Actress	Zendaya	Nominated	
World Soundtrack Awards	October 10, 2026	Film Composer of the Year	Daniel Pemberton (Note: Also for The Bad Guys 2 (2025), Masters of the Universe (2026), and Project Hail Mary (2026))	Won	
Hollywood Music in Media Awards	November 18, 2026	Best Original Score – Independent Film	Daniel Pemberton	Nominated	
Gotham Independent Film Awards	November 30, 2026	Audience Award	Kristoffer Borgli, Ari Aster, Lars Knudsen, Tyler Campellone	Pending	
