= Karama Has No Walls =

- Directed by: Sara Ishaq
- Produced by: Sara Ishaq
- Edited by: Sara Ishaq & Amir Hamdani
- Distributed by: The Cinema Guild
- Release date: October 2012 (UK)
- Running time: 26 minutes

Karama Has No Walls is a 2013 documentary film by Sara Ishaq about the Yemen revolution.

== Accolades ==
Awards
Award	Date of ceremony	Category	Recipients and nominees	Result
Academy Award	March 2, 2014	Best Short Subject Documentary	Sara Ishaq	Nominated
