= Asia Pacific Screen Award for Best Performance =

Annual film award

- Country: Australia
- Presented by: Asia Pacific Screen Academy
- First award: 2022
- Currently held by: Pushpa Thing Lama for Elephants in the Fog (2026)
- Website: asiapacificscreenawards.com

The Asia Pacific Screen Award for Best Performance has been presented annually by the Asia Pacific Screen Academy since 2022, replacing the Best Performance by an Actor and Best Performance by an Actress categories.

== Winners and nominees ==
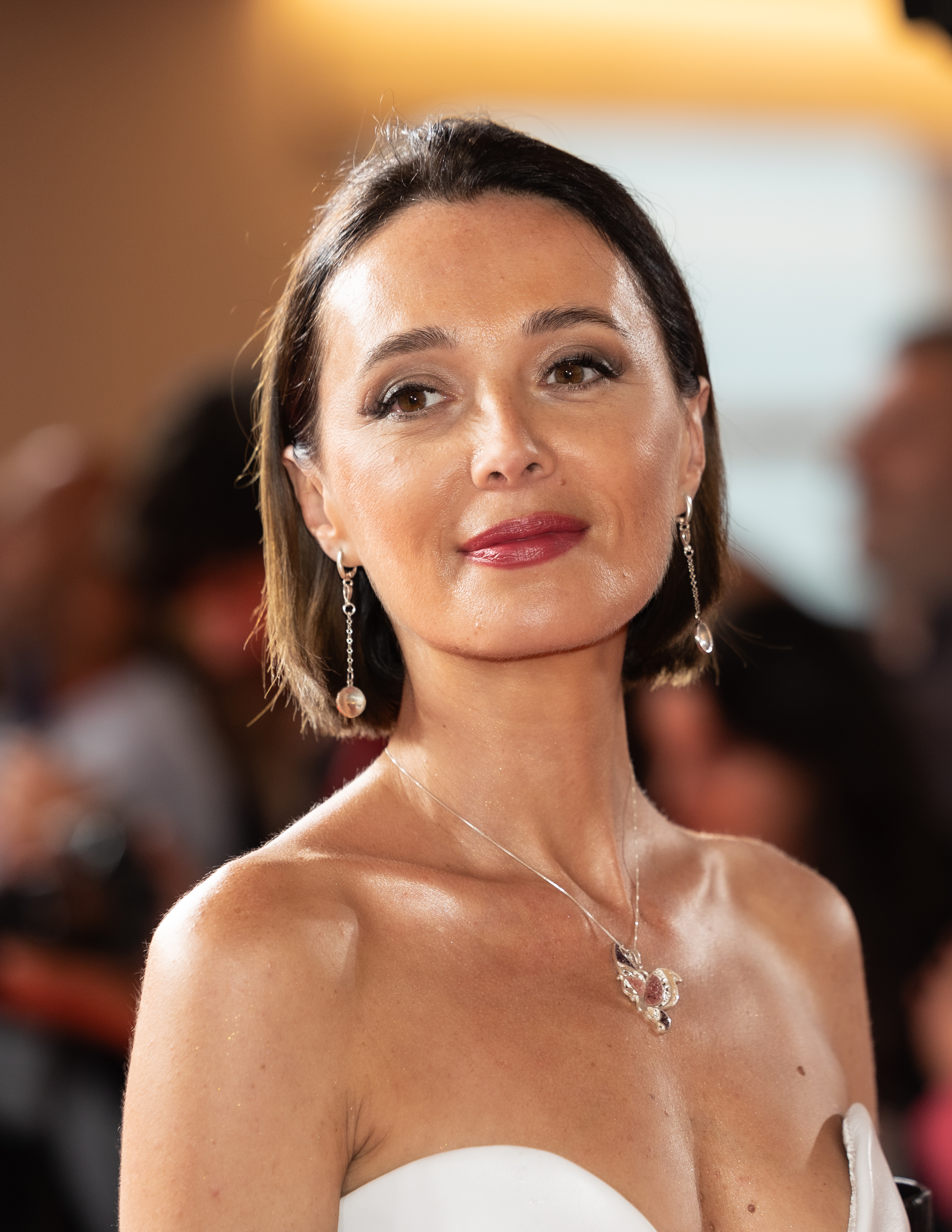
Ia Sukhitashvili won in 2024 for April.

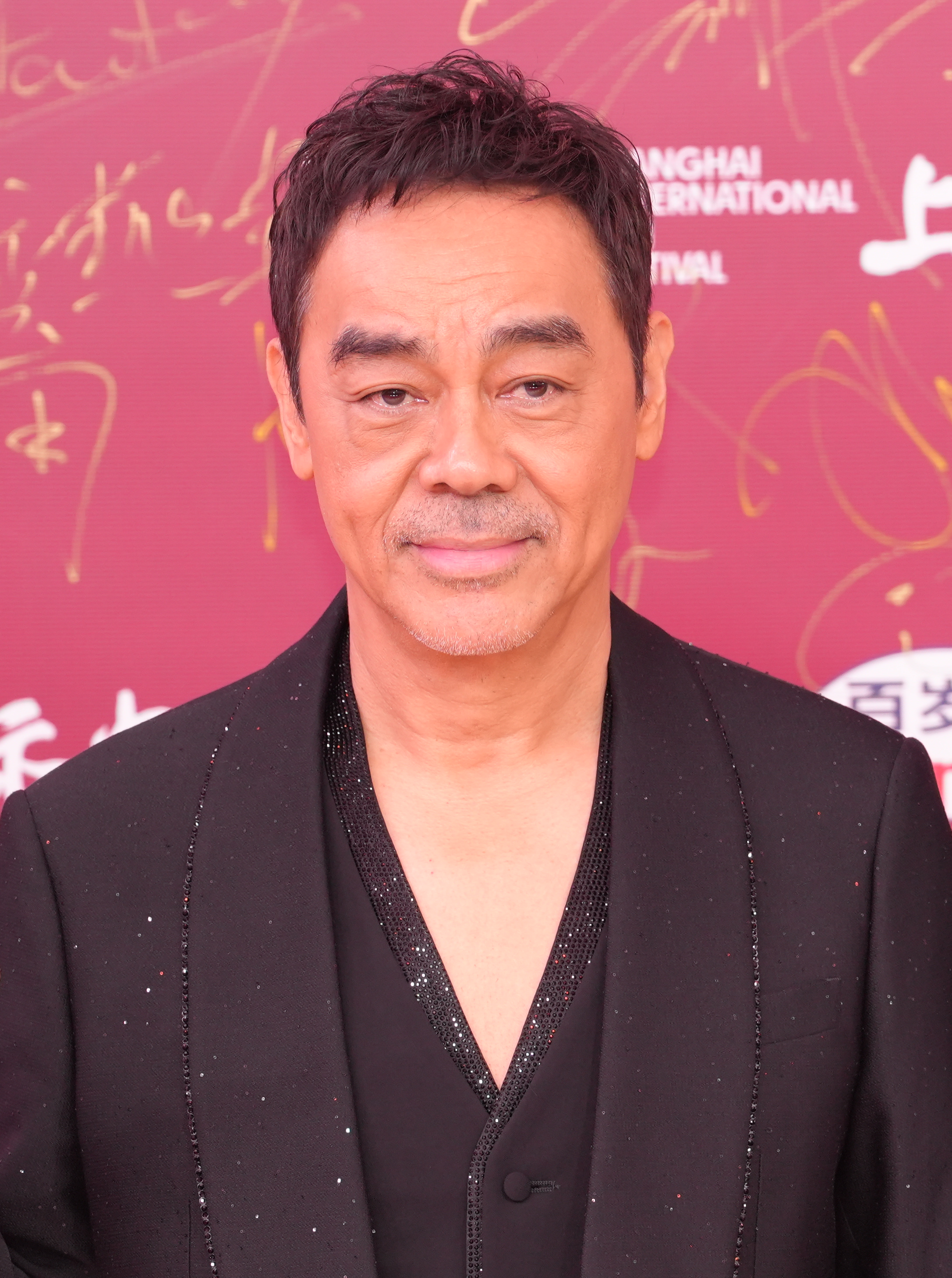
Sean Lau won in 2025 for Papa.

Year	Recipient(s)	English title	Original title	Ref.
2022	Lee Jung-eun	Hommage	오마주	
2022	John Lloyd Cruz	When the Waves Are Gone	Kapag Wala Nang Mga Alon	
2022	Aktan Arym Kubat	This Is What I Remember	Esimde	
2022	Navid Mohammadzadeh	Beyond the Wall	شب، داخلی، دیوار	
2022	Happy Salma	Before, Now & Then	Nana	
2023	Mouna Hawa	Inshallah a Boy	إن شاء الله ولد	
2023	Koji Yakusho	Perfect Days		
2023	Jinpa	Snow Leopard	雪豹	
2023	Mihaya Shirata	Last Shadow at First Light		
2023	Zhou Dongyu	The Breaking Ice	燃冬	
2024	Ia Sukhitashvili	April	აპრილი	
2024	Kani Kusruti	All We Imagine as Light		
2024	Yuumi Kawai	Desert of Namibia	ナミビアの砂漠	
2024	Madina Akylbekova	Madina		
2024	Soheila Golestani	The Seed of the Sacred Fig	دانه‌ی انجیر معابد	
2025	Sean Lau	Papa	爸爸	
2025	Khairiah Nathmy	Hijra		
2025	Xin Zhilei	The Sun Rises on Us All	日掛中天	
2025	Ariel Bronz	Yes!	!כן	
2025	Georges Khabbaz	Yunan	يونان	
2026	Pushpa Thing Lama	Elephants in the Fog	तिनीहरू	
2026	Virginie Efira and Tao Okamoto	All of a Sudden	急に具合が悪くなる	
2026	Anwar Hashimi	No Good Men		
2026	Ghassan Saad	Pipes		
2026	Yeo Yann Yann	We Are All Strangers	我们不是陌生人	

== See also ==
- Asian Film Award for Best Actor
- Asian Film Award for Best Actress
- Gotham Independent Film Award for Outstanding Lead Performance
- Independent Spirit Award for Best Lead Performance
- Silver Bear for Best Leading Performance
- Silver Shell for Best Leading Performance
