= Breaking the Cycle =

2024 Thai political documentary film

- Thai: อำนาจ ศรัทธา อนาคต
- Directed by: Ekaphong Saranset; Thanakrit Duangmaniporn
- Release date: May 2024 (Hot Docs)
- Running time: 116 minutes
- Country: Thailand
- Language: Thai

Breaking the Cycle is a 2024 Thai political documentary directed by Aekaphong Saransate and Thankrit Duangmaneeporn. The film chronicles the establishment of the Future Forward Party by Thanathorn Juangroongruangkit and the party's subsequent dissolution. The film was first shown at the 2024 Hot Docs Canadian International Documentary Festival, and was subsequently shown in Thai theaters.
