= Jiang Xiaoxuan =

Chinese director

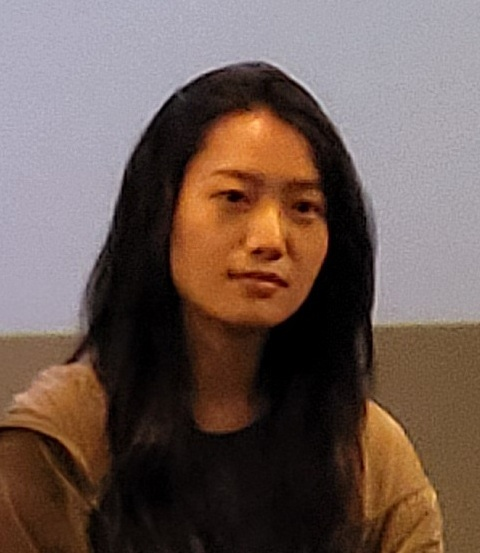
- Jiang in April 2025
- Born: Inner Mongolia
- Education: NYU Tisch; IMA Low Residency Program
- Occupation: Filmmaker
- Known for: To Kill a Mongolian Horse

Chinese name
- Traditional Chinese: 姜曉萱
- Simplified Chinese: 姜晓萱
Transcriptions
Standard Mandarin
- Hanyu Pinyin: Jiāng Xiǎoxuān

Jiang Xiaoxuan (Chinese: 姜晓萱) is a Chinese filmmaker. Her debut film, To Kill a Mongolian Horse, premiered at the Venice Film Festival in 2024, where Jiang won the Authors Under 40 Award—Special Mention for Best Directing.

== Early life and education ==
Jiang was born in Inner Mongolia to an ethnic Manchu family and grew up in the northern mining centre of Baotou. Her father was a horse breeder and her mother came from a long line of singers. She graduated from NYU Tisch in 2020 and then from the Interactive Media Arts Low Residency Master's Program, a joint offering of NYU Shanghai and NYU Tisch, in 2022.

== Career ==
During the COVID-19 pandemic, in between her education at NYU Tisch and IMA, she returned to Inner Mongolia "to seek inspiration for my thesis and rediscover something new." There, she filmed a short documentary and stumbled upon "a female horse that had died of a miscarriage, beside her a lifeless fetus frozen stiff on the ground," an image that would later inspire To Kill a Mongolian Horse.

To Kill a Mongolian Horse premiered at the Venice Film Festival in 2024. It earned two nominations for the Asia Pacific Screen Awards, specifically best film and best director.
