= Ia Sukhitashvili =

Georgian actress

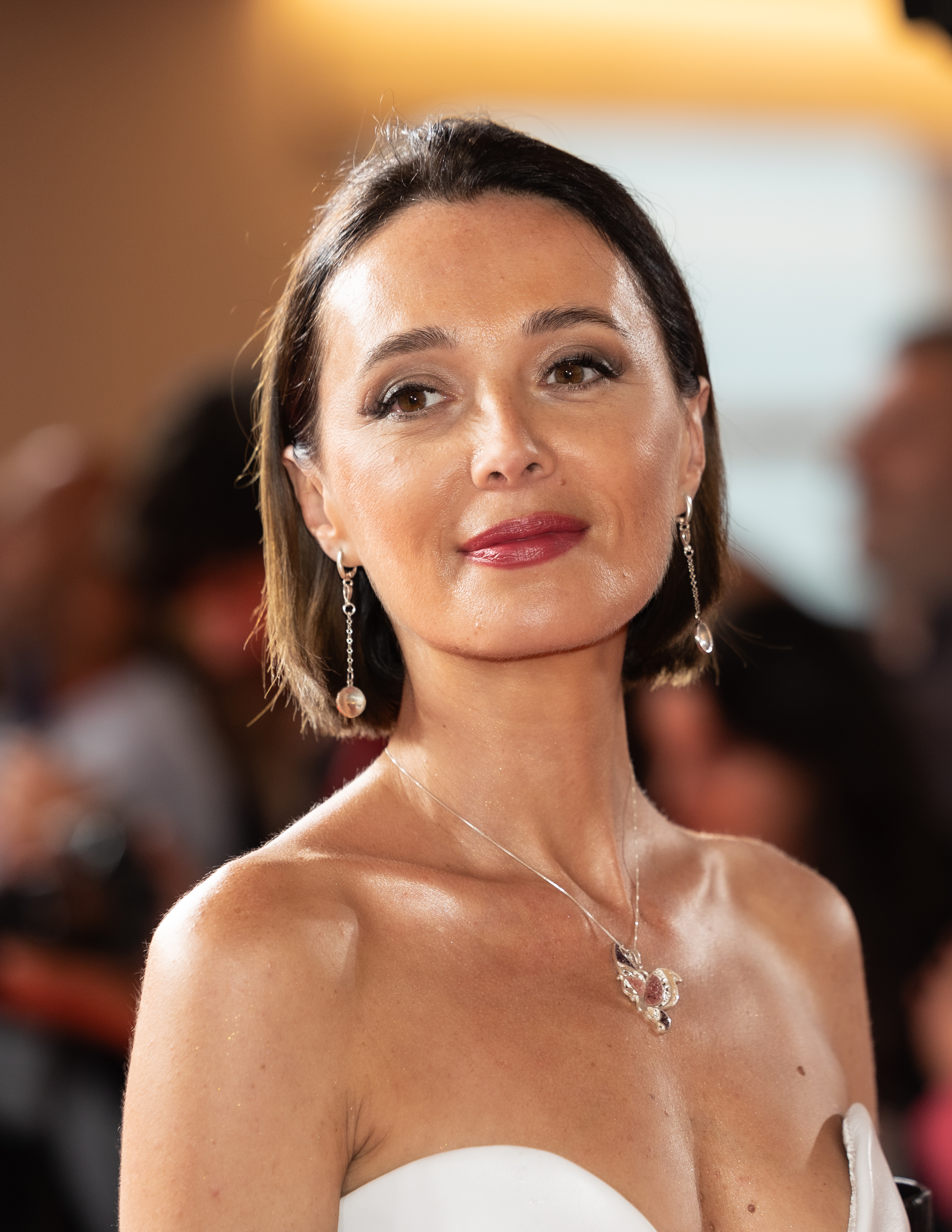
- Ia Sukhitashvili at the 2024 Venice Film Festival
- Born: August 29, 1980 (age 45); Tbilisi, Soviet Union

Ia Sukhitashvili (Georgian: ია სუხიტაშვილი; born 29 August 1980 in Tbilisi) is a Georgian actress of theatre and cinema. She appears in A trip to Karabakh 2 (2009) and Blind Dates (2013) by Levan Koguashvili. In 2020, she won the Silver Shell for Best Actress at the 68th San Sebastián International Film Festival.

== Filmography ==
=== Film ===
Year	Title	Role	Notes	Ref.
2005	Garpastum	Vita	Credited as Iamze Sukhitashvili	
2009	A Trip To Karabakh 2: Conflict Zone	Iana's Friend #1	—N/a	
2009	Tbilisuri Love Story	Tika	—N/a	
2012	Keep Smiling	Gvantsa Korinteli	Credited as Iamze Sukhitashvili	
2013	Blind Dates	Manana	—N/a	
2015	The Summer of Frozen Fountains	Lika	—N/a	
2020	Beginning	Yana	Silver Shell for Best Actress	
2024	April	Nina	Asia Pacific Screen Award for Best Performance	
2024	Panopticon	Natalia	Georgian entry for Best International Feature Film at the 98th Academy Awards	

=== Television ===
Year	Title	Role	Notes	Ref.
2003-2004	Hot Dog	Keti	—N/a	
2015	Paradox	Tina	6 episodes	
