= A Dark, Dark Man =

Kazakh crime drama film (2019)

- Directed by: Adilkhan Yerzhanov
- Written by: Adilkhan Yerzhanov; Roelof Jan Minneboo
- Produced by: Akan Satayev; Ernar Kurmashev
- Starring: Daniar Alshinov; Dinara Baktybayeva; Teoman Khos
- Cinematography: Aidar Sharipov
- Music by: Galymzhan Moldanazar
- Production companies: Astana Film Fund; Short Brothers; Arizona Productions
- Release dates: September 2019 (San Sebastián); 14 October 2020
- Running time: 130 minutes
- Country: Kazakhstan
- Languages: Russian; Kazakh
- Budget: $40,000

A Dark, Dark Man (Russian: Чёрный, чёрный человек, translit. Chornyy, chornyy chelovek) is a 2019 Kazakhstani crime drama film directed by Adilkhan Yerzhanov. It has received the Asia Pacific Screen Award for Achievement in Directing in 2019, and also was shown on the 67th San Sebastián International Film Festival.

== Plot ==
A little boy is murdered in the village of Karatas. The investigation is entrusted to a young detective named Bekzat, although local criminal bosses indicate they do not want the investigation to progress, with the police already finding a suspect - an intellectually disabled man named Pukuar, whom Bekzat is tasked to kill.

However, a journalist named Ariana soon arrives in Karatas to observe the investigation, ruining Bekzat's plans. She points out that this is the fourth such murder, and previous victims had similar traits - they are small orphan boys; she does not believe that Pukuar could be the murderer and has Bekzat actually investigate the murder.

Unwillingly going deeper into the investigation, Bekzat understands that the murderer is actually one of the local criminal kingpins, who then murders the chief of police and tells Bekzat to tie up loose ends, with Ariana eventually beaten up and framed of drug possession, however, Bekzat has changed, and eventually decides to leave Pukuar and his friend at his friend's house in the mountains for their safety, then going on a killing spree. He shoots two corrupt policemen in the countryside, then massacres everybody responsible for the murder in the police station, himself getting gravely injured. Ariana, along with a film crew, later comes to the police station, finding Bekzat, who has succumbed to his injuries.

== Cast ==
- Daniar Alshinov as Bekzat
- Dinara Baktybayeva as Ariana
- Teoman Khos as Pukuar
- Adema Yerzhanova as Adema
- Yerken Gubashev as the Man in Black
- Nurbek Mukushev as Chief of Police

== Reception ==
Ben Kenigsberg from The New York Times praised the film, describing it as "grim revelations with breathtaking rapidity". The reviewer also stated that the mystery element was "handled obliquely". Reviewing from Variety, Jessica Kiang praised A Dark, Dark Man as a "twisted film" that was "gratifyingly self-aware, an ironic and knowing transposition of urban crime thriller archetypes".
