= Sara Ishaq =

Yemeni-Scottish film director

- سارة إسحاق
- Born: Edinburgh
- Education: University of Edinburgh; Edinburgh College of Art
- Occupation: Film Director
- Awards: Academy Award Nomination, BAFTA Scotland Nomination

Sara Ishaq is a Yemeni-Scottish film director. Ishaq directed and produced the critically acclaimed film Karama Has No Walls (2012). The short film was nominated for an Academy Award for Best Documentary (Short Subject) and BAFTA Scotland New Talents award. In 2013, her award-winning personal documentary film The Mulberry House, which deals with her relationship with her family against the backdrop of the 2011 Yemeni uprising, premiered at IDFA.

== Education ==
Sara Ishaq attended Yemen Modern School until graduation and Linlithgow Academy in Scotland for a year of high school. Ishaq attended University of Edinburgh in 2003, where she obtained an MA (Honours) in Humanities and Social Sciences, with a focus on religious studies, International & Human Rights Law & Modern Middle Eastern Studies in 2007. In 2010, she pursue a MFA in Film Directing at the Edinburgh College of Art, graduating in 2012.

== Humanitarian Pursuits ==
In 2011, Ishaq co-founded the #SupportYemen Media Collective, an organizing and strategizing effort to advance social justice, build a democratic civic state, promote non-violence and break the silence on human rights violations in Yemen. In 2017, Ishaq co-founded Comra - a film production company and academy for film training in Sana'a. In 2022, she joined the International Coalition for Filmmakers at Risk (ICFR), which she currently runs in Amsterdam, to support filmmakers at risk internationally.

Her earliest humanitarian pursuit occurred between 2009 and 2016, teaching rehabilitative yoga classes at the Nablus Women's Centre while volunteering with Project Hope (Palestine), as well as various studios across Cairo (Egypt), focusing on women suffering from Post Traumatic Stress Disorder. In 2015 Ishaq was barred from entering Palestine to participate in the Palestine Festival of Literature. Sara also ran Arts & Crafts workshops for children that had survived airstrikes in Yemen after the onslaught of the 2015 war.

== Awards and grants ==
The Mulberry House (2013)

- Jury Prize at This Human World Film Festival in Vienna
- Audience Favourite Award at Berwick Film Festival UK

Karama Has No Walls (2012)

- Nominations for Academy Award for Best Short Film 2014,
- One World Media Award 2013
- BAFTA Scotland New Talents Award 2012
- Winner of 5 International Film Awards including Al-Jazeera TV Documentary Award & United Nations Association Film Festival Award

== Filmography ==
- 2026 The Station (Debut Feature Fiction). Role" Director/Writer
- 2013 The Mulberry House (Documentary). Role: Director/Co-producer
- 2012 Karama Has No Walls (Short Documentary). Role: Director/Producer

Television credits

- 2007 Women in Black - BBC 2. Role: Location Coordinator/Researcher/Translator.
- 2011 Yemen Uprising - BBC Newsnight & Our World Episodes. Role: Assistant Director/Camera Operator
- 2012 Entrepreneurial Tribal Women – Media Trust. Role: Assistant Director/ Location Coordinator/Translator
- 2013 Yemeni Child Prisoners On Death Row - Channel Four Unreported World. Role: Local Producer/Translator
- 2016-2017 BBC Our World. Role: Documentary Development and Research
- 2025 Getuigen van Gaza - NTR Dutch National Television / Director

== Sources ==
- "Sara Ishaq's journey from making a family film to the Oscar-nominated documentary Karama Has No Walls | The National".
