= Asia Pacific Screen Awards =

Australian film and culture award ceremony

- Current: 19th Asia Pacific Screen Awards
- Asia Pacific Screen Awards logo
- Awarded for: Best in film and documentary in the Asia-Pacific region
- Country: Australia
- Presented by: UNESCO, FIAPF and Brisbane City Council, Australia
- First award: 2007
- Website: asiapacificscreenawards.com

The Asia Pacific Screen Awards (APSA) is an international cultural initiative overseen by the Asia Pacific Screen Academy and headquartered in Australia, sometimes called "Asia-Pacific Oscars". In order to realise UNESCO's goals of promoting and preserving the different cultures through the influential medium of cinema, it honours and promotes the films, actors, directors, and cultures of the Asia Pacific area to a worldwide audience.

== Event history ==
APSA was established in 2007 and works with FIAPF, the International Federation of Film Producers Associations. An international jury selects the winners, and films are evaluated based on their cinematic quality and how well they reflect their cultural backgrounds. More than 70 nations and regions in the Asia Pacific region are represented by APSA, which introduces their films to new international audiences. It is a sister organisation to the European Film Academy and Premios PLATINO del Cine Iberoamericano.

Nominees are inducted into the Asia Pacific Screen Academy. Australian screen legend, Jack Thompson AM, is the President of the academy.

Members of the International Jury in the past include Tran Anh Hung, Annemarie Jacir, Anocha Suwichakornpong, Garin Nugroho, Diana El Jieroudi, Eric Khoo, Mike Downey, Rubaiyat Hossain, Alexander Rodnyansky, Nia Dinata, Deepak Rauniyar, Jill Bilcock, He Saifei, Adolfo Alix Jr, Asghar Farhadi, Anthony Chen, Hiam Abbass, Lu Yue, Maciej Stuhr, Rajit Kapur, Shyam Benegal, Malini Fonseka, Nansun Shi, David Puttnam, Sergey Dvortsevoy, Salman Aristo, Gina Kim, Samuel Maoz, Kaori Momoi, Tahmineh Milani, Jan Chapman, Sasson Gabai, Tian Zhuangzhuang, Aparna Sen, Bruce Beresford, Huang Jianxin, Shabana Azmi and Jafar Panahi.

== Film categories and awards ==
The following types of film are eligible for submission of movies:

- Feature Film (60+ minutes)
- Animated Film (40+ minutes)
- Youth Film (60+ minutes and made for and/or about young people to the age of 18 years)
- Documentary film (40+ minutes)

As of 2024 following accomplishments are recognised with the following awards:

- Best Film
- Best Animated Film
- Best Documentary Film
- Best Youth Film
- Best Director
- Best Screenplay
- Best Cinematographer
- Best Performance (Note: This category was created in 2022, superseding the previous Best Performance by an Actress and Best Performance by an Actor.)
- Best New Performer
- Jury Grand Prize

In addition, exceptional success is recognised with special awards:

- FIAPF Award, for outstanding achievement in film in the Asia Pacific region
- Cultural Diversity Award for the outstanding contribution to the promotion and preservation of cultural diversity through film
- Young Cinema Award in partnership with NETPAC and Griffith Film School, recognises the abundant emerging talent of the Asia Pacific.

== Major award winners ==
Year	Best Film	Best Animated Film	Best Documentary Film	Best Youth Film	Best Director	Best Screenplay	Best Cinematographer	Best Performance by an Actress	Best Performance by an Actor	Best Performance
2007; 1st	(South Korea) Secret Sunshine	Japan 5 Centimeters per Second	Lebanon Beirut Diaries: Truth, Lies and Videos	Indonesia Denias, Singing on the Could	Iran Rakhshan Bani-E'temad, Mohsen Abdolvahab for Mainline	(India) Feroz Abbas Khan for Gandhi, My Father	Iran Hooman Behmanesh for Those Three	(South Korea) Jeon Do-yeon for Secret Sunshine	(Turkey) Erkan Can for Takva: A Man's Fear of God	
2008; 2nd	(Kazakhstan) Tulpan	Israel France Germany Waltz with Bashir	(South Korea) 63 Years On	Australia The Black Ballon	(Turkey) Nuri Bilge Ceylan for Three Monkeys	(Israel) Eran Riklis and Suha Arraf for Lemon Tree	(South Korea) Lee Mogae for The Good, The Bad, The Weird	(Israel) Hiam Abbass for Lemon Tree	(Iran) Reza Naji for The Song of Sparrows	
2009; 3rd	(Australia) Samson & Delilah	Australia Mary and Max	Israel Denmark United States Defamation	South Korea A Brand New Life	(China) Lu Chuan for City of Life and Death	(Iran) Asghar Farhadi for About Elly	China Cao Yu for City of Life and Death	(South Korea) Kim Hye-ja for Mother	(Japan) Masahiro Motoki for Departures	
2010; 4th	(China) Aftershock	China Piercing I	China Canada Last Train Home	Iran The Other	(South Korea) Lee Chang-dong for Poetry	(Israel) Samuel Maoz for Lebanon	(India) Sudheer Palsane for The Well	(South Korea) Yoon Jeong-hee for Poetry	(China) Chen Daoming for Aftershock	
2011; 5th	(Iran) A Separation	(South Korea) Leafie, A Hen Into The Wild	Sweden Japan United States I Was Worth 50 Sheep	Azerbaijan Buta	(Turkey) Nuri Bilge Ceylan; Once Upon a Time in Anatolia	(Russia) Denis Osokin for Silent Souls	Turkey Gökhan Tiryaki for Once Upon A Time in Anatolia	(Russia) Nadezhda Markina for Elena	(China) Wang Baoqiang for Mr. Tree	
2012; 6th	(Turkey) Beyond the Hill	Japan A Letter to Momo	Iraq United Kingdom Netherlands In My Mother's Arms	Indonesia The Mirror Never Lies	(Philippines) Brillante Mendoza for Thy Womb	(Turkey) Reis Çelik for Night of Silence	(Turkey) Touraj Aslani for Rhino Season	(Philippines) Nora Aunor for Thy Womb	(South Korea) Choi Min-sik for Nameless Gangster: Rules of the Time	
2013; 7th	(Palestine) Omar	Russia Ku! Kin-dza-dza	Denmark Norway United Kingdom The Act of Killing	South Korea Juvenile Offender	(Singapore) Anthony Chen for Ilo Ilo	(India) Ritesh Batra for The Lunchbox	China Lu Yue for Back to 1942	(China) Zhang Ziyi for The Grandmaster	(South Korea) Lee Byung-hun for Masquerade	
2014; 8th	(Russia) Leviathan	Japan The Tale of Princess Kaguya	Iraq 1001 Apples	Turkey Germany Sivas	(Turkey) Nuri Bilge Ceylan for Winter Sleep	(Iran) Nima Javidi; Melbourne	China Hong Kong Dong Jinsong for Black Coal, Thin Ice	(China) Lü Zhong for Red Amnesia	(New Zealand) Cliff Curtis for The Dark Horse	
2015; 9th	(Thailand) Cemetery of Splendour	Japan Miss Hokusai	China The Chinese Mayor	China River	(Russia) Aleksei Alekseivich German for Under Electric Clouds	(Turkey) Senem Tüzen for Motherland	TaiwanMark Lee Ping-bing for The Assassin	(Japan) Kirin Kiki for Sweet Bean	(South Korea) Jung Jae-young for Right Now, Wrong Then	
2016; 10th	(Turkey) Cold of Kalandar	South Korea Yeon Sang-ho for Seoul Station	Iran Mehrdad Oskouei for Starless Dreams	South Korea Yoon Ga-eun The World of Us	(China) Feng Xiaogang for I Am Not Madame Bovary	(Japan) Ryusuke Hamaguchi; Tadashi Nohara & Tomoyuki Takahashi for Happy Hour	Turkey Hungary Cevahir Şahin, Kürşat Üresin for Cold of Kalandar	(Philippines) Hasmine Killip for Ordinary People	(India) Manoj Bajpayee for Aligarh	
2017; 11th	(Australia) Sweet Country	Canada Ann Marie Fleming for Window Horses: The Poetic Persian Epiphany of Rosie Ming	Syria Denmark Germany Last Men in Aleppo	Indonesia Australia Qatar Netherlands Kamila Andini for The Seen and Unseen	(Russia) Andrey Zvyagintsev for Loveless	(India) Amit Masurkar& Mayank Tewari for Newton	Russia Rustam Khamdamov for The Bottomless Bag	(Georgia (country)) Nato Murvanidze for Scary Mother	(India) Rajkummar Rao for Newton	
2018 12th	(Japan) Shoplifters	Russia Leo Gabriadze for Rezo	Australia Paul Damien Williams, Shannon Swan for Gurrumul	Turkey The Pigeon	(Lebanon) Nadine Labaki for Capharnaüm	(Israel) Dan Kleinman and Sameh Zoabi for Tel Aviv on Fire	Singapore France Netherlands Hideho Urata for A Land Imagined	(China) Zhao Tao for Ash Is Purest White	(India) Nawazuddin Siddiqui for Manto	
2019 13th	(South Korea) Parasite	Japan Makoto Shinkai for Weathering with You	Israel Switzerland Canada Rachel Leah Jones & Philippe Bellaiche forAdvocate	Australia Rodd Rathjen for Buoyancy	(Kazakhstan) (France) Adilkhan Yerzhanov for A Dark, Dark Man	(Russia) Kantemir Balagov & Aleksandr Terekhov for Beanpole	Russia Ksenia SEREDA for Beanpole	(Philippines) Maxene Eigenmann for Verdict	(India) Manoj Bajpayee for Bhonsle	
2021 14th	(Japan) Drive My Car	Russia Andrei Khrzhanovsky for The Nose or the Conspiracy of Mavericks	Sweden Hogir Hirori for Sabaya	South Korea Yoon Dan-bi for Moving On	(Iran) (France) Asghar Farhadi for A Hero	(Japan) Ryusuke Hamaguchi& Takamasa Oe for Drive My Car	Vietnam Singapore France Thailand GermanyNguyễn Vinh Phúc for Taste	(Bangladesh) Azmeri Haque Badhon for Rehana Maryam Noor	(Georgia (country)) Merab Ninidze for House Arrest	
2022 15th	(Indonesia) Before, Now & Then	(Armenia) (Germany) (Lithuania) Aurora's Sunrise	(India) (United States) (United Kingdom) All That Breathes	(Jordan) (Palestine) (Saudi Arabia) (Sweden) Farha	(Cambodia) (France) Davy Chou – Return to Seoul	(Indonesia) Makbul Mubarak – Autobiography	(Germany) Niklas Lindschau – The Stranger	(category retired)	(category retired)	(South Korea) Lee Jung-eun – Hommage as Ji-wan
2023 16th	(Japan) (Germany) Perfect Days	(France) (Germany) (Luxembourg) (Belgium) The Siren	(India) Against the Tide	(Kazakhstan) Bauryna Salu	(South Korea) (United States) Celine Song for Past Lives	(Canada) (South Korea) Anthony Shim for Riceboy Sleeps	(Kazakhstan) Azamat Dulatov for Qas			(Palestine) Mouna Hawa for Inshallah a Boy
2024 17th	(Georgia (country)) (Italy) (France) April	(Philippines) The Missing	(Palestine) (Norway) No Other Land	(India) Boong	(Georgia (country)) (Netherlands) Tato Kotetishvili for Holy Electricity	(Turkey) (Spain) (Romania) (France) Selman Nacar for Hesitation Wound	(Taiwan) (Singapore) (France) Michaël Capron for Mongrel			(Georgia (country)) (Italy) (France) Ia Sukhitashvili for April
2025 18th	(Iran) (Luxembourg) (France) It Was Just an Accident	The Square	(France) (Palestine) Put Your Soul on Your Hand and Walk	Amoeba	Jafar Panahi	Chie Hayakawa				

== Other awards ==
On 29 November 2018, the 12th Asia Pacific Screen Awards presented the Best Original Score Asia Pacific Screen Award for the first time. The head of the jury for the first-ever award was Ryuichi Sakamoto. This new category is intended to "honour more excellent films and the musicians who contribute so profoundly to the emotions of the movie," according to APSA Chairman Michael Hawkins.

=== Winners and nominees ===
2018

Year	Nominees	English title	Original title
2018	(Iceland) (Iceland) Hildur Guðnadóttir, Jóhann Jóhannsson	Mary Magdalene	
2018	(Greece) Eléni Karaïndrou	Bomb, A Love Story	Bomb, Yek Asheghaneh
2018	(United Kingdom) Harry Gregson-Williams	Breath	
2018	(United Arab Emirates) (United States) Omar Fadel	Yomeddine	
2018	(Philippines) Ryan Cayabyab	The Portrait	
