= Beginning (2020 film) =

2020 film directed by Déa Kulumbegashvili

- Film poster
- Georgian: Dasatskisi
- Directed by: Déa Kulumbegashvili
- Written by: Déa Kulumbegashvili; Rati Oneli
- Produced by: Ilan Amouyal; Rati Oneli; David Zerat; Steven Darty (co-pro); Adrien Dassault (co-pro)
- Starring: Ia Sukhitashvili; Rati Oneli
- Cinematography: Arseni Khachaturan
- Edited by: Matthieu Taponier
- Music by: Nicolas Jaar
- Production companies: First Picture; OFA
- Distributed by: MUBI
- Release date: 11 September 2020 (TIFF)
- Running time: 130 minutes
- Countries: Georgia; France
- Language: Georgian

Beginning (Georgian: დასაწყისი, dasats’q’isi, Dasatskisi, working title: Naked Sky) is a 2020 Georgian-French drama film, directed by Déa Kulumbegashvili, about the wife of a Jehovah's Witness leader who becomes disillusioned with her life inside a patriarchal religious community after its place of worship is firebombed by violent extremists. It was in the official selection of the Cannes Film Festival, and had its premiere at the 2020 Toronto International Film Festival (TIFF), where it won the FIPRESCI Prize. It was subsequently screened and won awards at the San Sebastián International Film Festival, and the Adelaide Film Festival.

Beginning received mostly favourable reviews from critics, with the direction compared to that of Austrian director Michael Haneke.

== Plot ==
Yana, the wife of a Jehovah's Witness religious leader, David, becomes disillusioned with her life inside a patriarchal religious community after its Kingdom Hall is firebombed by violent extremists. This event is the starting point of the film, which focuses on Yana's interior life and emotional deterioration after David apparently does not understand what she is trying to express, and repeatedly says that something is wrong with her. David reports the firebombing to the police, who pressure him to delete the security footage of the incident. He decides to present himself to the elders of the church and ask them for funding for the construction of a new Kingdom Hall, leaving Yana alone with their son Giorgi.

A detective from Tbilisi calls on Yana, ostensibly to ask questions about the fire at the church, but his questions become intrusive and personal, including about her sexual life with her husband. He asks if she feels scared, to which she answers "Yes". He asks her to sit on the couch with him, before forcing her hand into his trousers. Shortly afterwards he apologizes and leaves. Yana heads to the police, but is informed by the officer there that no detective from Tbilisi has arrived. Later at night, the detective ambushes Yana near a river and sexually assaults her. He briefly appears to consider killing her with a rock, but decides against it and leaves.

Yana visits her mother and sister. Her mother tells her a story about when Yana was a child and used to cry through the night, which resulted in her drunk father kicking her and her mother out, forcing them to spend the night under a nearby tree. David returns home, but in the morning Yana finds him listening to an audio recording of the questions she was asked earlier by the detective. She tells him that she was raped, but he does not believe her due to the deceptive nature of the audio.

David and Yana attend a series of baptisms, including that of Giorgi. On the way home, David suggests that they should move to Tbilisi to start over. At home, Yana blends a large number of pills into a smoothie and makes Giorgi drink it. When David asks what has happened, she tells him that she has killed their child and refuses to look at him. Elsewhere, the detective from earlier, identified as Alex, is seen hunting with a group. He lays down on the ground and appears to turn to dust.

== Cast ==
- Ia Sukhitashvili – Jana
- Rati Oneli – David
- Kakha Kintsurashvili – Detective
- Saba Gogichaishvili – Giorgi

== Production ==
Mexican filmmaker Carlos Reygadas is executive producer. The film is Kulumbegashvili's first feature film as director. Originally given the working title Naked Sky, the film was awarded a production grant by the International Film Festival Rotterdam (IFFR), and Kulumbegashvili was given the Cannes Film Festival Cinéfondation residence in Paris and other assistance with development of the film by the Sam Spiegel International Film Lab, the Sofia International Film Festival, and the Sarajevo Film Festival.

== Release ==
The film was named as an official selection of the 2020 Cannes Film Festival in May 2020; however, due to the COVID-19 pandemic, it was not screened there until the special outdoor screening series in October that year. It had its premiere at the 2020 Toronto International Film Festival, and was screened at the New York Film Festival, the 68th San Sebastián International Film Festival (where it holds the record for the most awards in the main competition of the festival, taking home Best Film, Best Director, Best Screenplay and Best Actress), and the Adelaide Film Festival.

== Critical response ==
The film received mostly favourable reviews from critics, with the direction compared to that of Austrian director Michael Haneke. It was very well received at the New York Film Festival, and IONCINEMA said the film was "a gruelling masterwork...reminiscent of the sleeping rage teased out in the Romanian New Wave offerings" and compared Kulumbegashvili to the Romanian directors Cristi Puiu and Cristian Mungiu”.

=== Accolades ===
- Toronto Film Festival: FIPRESCI Prize
- San Sebastián International Film Festival:
  - Producers Ilan Amouyal, Rati Oneli and David Zera – Golden Shell for best film
  - Kulumbegashvili – Silver Shell for Best Director
  - Kulumbegashvili and Oneli – Jury Prize for Best Screenplay
  - Sukhitashvili – Silver Shell for Best Actress.
- Adelaide Film Festival: Feature Fiction Award.
- Selected as the Georgian entry for the Best International Feature Film at the 93rd Academy Awards, but it was not nominated.

The film was nominated in the "Cinema Extraordinaire" category at Bergen International Film Festival.
