= Dea Kulumbegashvili =

Georgian film director and screenwriter

- Dea Kulumbegashvili at the 81st Venice International Film Festival
- Education: The New School; Columbia University
- Occupations: Film director; screenwriter
- Years active: 2013–present

Dea Kulumbegashvili (Georgian: დეა კულუმბეგაშვილი) is a film director and screenwriter from Georgia.

== Early life and education ==
Kulumbegashvili was raised in a small town called Lagodekhi at the border with Azerbaijan. She grew up during a Civil War, ethnic conflict and a decade of chaos that followed collapse of Soviet Union. She has stated that initially she was drawn to literature and read compulsively. Through her childhood and teenage years, Kulumbegashvili was not able to watch films due to periods of blackouts that lasted for months at a time.

She studied Media Studies at The New School, before earning a Master of Fine Arts in Film Directing at Columbia University School of the Arts,.

== Career ==
Kulumbegashvili's debut short film, Invisible Spaces (Ukhilavi Sivrtseebi), was nominated for the Short Film Palme d’Or at the 2014 Cannes Film Festival. Two years later, her second short film, Lethe, premiered at the 2016 Cannes Film Festival. Both films were shown at MoMA in New York and at other film festivals.

Kulumbegashvili's debut feature film Beginning, was part of The Official Selection of 2020 Cannes Film Festival. However due to the COVID19 restrictions festival was not held in its "original form". Instead the film had its premiere at the 2020 Toronto International Film Festival (TIFF), where it won the FIPRESCI Prize. It was subsequently screened and won four awards at the San Sebastián International Film Festival, etc. Beginning was selected as the Georgian entry for the Best International Feature Film at the 93rd Academy Awards.

Kulumbegashvili received a 2022 Baumi Script Development Award for her second feature film, then known as Historia, about an abortion provider in rural Georgia. Filming on the project, later named April, took place in 2023; the film premiered in 2024 at the 81st Venice International Film Festival, where it won the Special Jury Prize. Subsequently the film was programmed for Toronto International Film Festival, San Sebastian International Film Festival, etc winning numerous awards.

Both, April and Beginning were programmed for the New York Film Festival, featured in the Main Slate. April was selected to screen in the Spotlight section at 2025 Sundance Film Festival.

Since 2023, Kulumbegashvili lives and works outside Georgia, due to the political crackdown and growing censorship of art within the country.

== Filmography ==
Year	Film	Original title	Notes
2014	Invisible Spaces	უხილავი სივრცეები	Short
2016	Léthé	ლეთა	Short
2020	Beginning	დასაწყისი	—N/a
2024	April	აპრილი	Special Jury Prize at the 81st Venice International Film Festival
