= Asia Pacific Screen Award for Best Film =

- Country: Australia
- Presented by: Asia Pacific Screen Academy
- First award: 2007
- Currently held by: April by Dea Kulumbegashvili (2024)
- Website: asiapacificscreenawards.com

The Asia Pacific Screen Award for Best Film, formerly Asia Pacific Screen Award for Best Feature Film, is an award category in the Asia Pacific Screen Awards.

The winners and nominees of this category are:

== Winners and nominees ==
=== 2000s ===
Year	Winner and nominees	English title	Original title
2007	(South Korea) Kim In-soo, Lee Chang-dong, Hanna Lee	Secret Sunshine	Miryang
2007	(Lebanon) Anne-Dominique Toussaint	Caramel	Sukkar banat
2007	(Indonesia) Garin Nugroho, Simon Field, Keith Griffiths	Opera Jawa	
2007	(Turkey) Sevil Demirci Çakar	Takva: A Man's Fear of God	Takva
2007	(Iran) Mehdi Homayounfar	The Night Bus	Autobus-E Shab
2008	(Kazakhstan) (Russia) (Switzerland) (Poland) (Germany) Sergey Melkumov, Karl Baumgartner	Tulpan	
2008	(India) Gauri Khan	Om Shanti Om	
2008	(China) Li Xudong	The Red Awn	Hongse Kangbaiyin
2008	(Hong Kong) Johnnie To	Sparrow	Man Jeuk
2008	(Turkey) (France) (Italy) Zeynep Özbatur	Three Monkeys	Üç Maymun
2009	(Australia) Warwick Thornton, Kath Shelper	Samson and Delilah	
2009	(China) Han Sanping, Qin Hing, Zhou Li, John Chong, Andy Zhang	City of Life and Death	Nanjing! Nanjing!
2009	(Palestine) (France) (Italy) (Belgium) (United Kingdom) Elia Suleiman, Hani Farsi	The Time That Remains	
2009	(Iran) Asghar Farhadi, Mahmoud Razavi	About Elly	Darbareye Elly
2009	(China) Han Sanping, Du Jiayi	Forever Enthralled	Mei Lanfang

=== 2010's ===
Year	Winner and nominees	English title	Original title
2010	(China) Feng Xiaogang	Aftershock	Tangshan dadizheng
2010	(Turkey) (Germany) Semih Kaplanoğlu	Honey	Bal
2010	(Taiwan) Lee Lieh, Doze Niu	Monga	Mengjia
2010	(Korea) Kim Ju-kyung	Paju	
2010	(Korea) Lee Joon-dong	Poetry	
2011	(Iran) Asghar Farhadi	A Separation	Jodaeiye Nader az Simin
2011	(Iran) Mohammad Rasoulof	Goodbye	Bé Omid É Didar
2011	(Turkey) Zeynep Özbatur Atakan	Once Upon a Time in Anatolia	Bir Zamanlar Anadolu'da
2011	(India) Aditya Chopra	Wedding Planners	Band Baaja Baaraat
2011	(China) Jiang Wen	Let the Bullets Fly	Rang zidan fei
2012	(Greece) (Turkey) Enis Köstepen, Seyfi Teoman, Emin Alper	Beyond the Hill	Tepenin Ardi
2012	(Iran) Javad Norouzbeigi	The Bear	Kher
2012	(Russia) Natalya Gostyushina, Sergei Kravets	The Horde	Orda
2012	(Korea) Park Shin-kyu, Han Jae-duk	Nameless Gangster: Rules of the Time	Bumchoiwaui Junjaeng
2012	(Taiwan) Peter Ho-sun Chan, Jojo Hui Yuet-chun	Dragon	Wu Xia
2013	(Palestine) Hany Abu-Assad, Waleed F. Zuaiter, David Gerson	Omar	
2013	(France) (Italy) Alexandre Mallet-Guy	The Past	Le Passé
2013	(Australia) Robert Connolly, Maggie Miles	The Turning	
2013	(Sri Lanka) Lasantha Nawarathna, Mohamed Adamaly	With You, Without You	Oba Nathuwa Oba Ekka
2013	(Bangladesh) Mostofa Sarwar Farooki	Television	
2013	(Japan) Matsuzaki Kaoru	Like Father, Like Son	Soshite chichi ni naru
2014	(Russia) Alexander Rodnyansky, Sergey Melkumov	Leviathan	
2014	(Iran) Reza Dormishian	I'm Not Angry!	عصبانی نیستم
2014	(Kazakhstan) Adilkhan Yerzhanov, Olga Khlasheva, Serik Abishev	The Owners	
2014	(Iraq) (Germany) Mehmet Aktaş	Memories on Stone	Bîranînen li ser kevirî
2014	(Turkey) (France) (Germany) Zeynep Özbatur Atakan	Winter Sleep	Kış Uykusu
2015	(Thailand) (Malaysia) (Germany) (France) (United Kingdom) Apichatpong Weerasethakul, Keith Griffiths, Simon Field, Charles De Meaux, Michael Weber, Hans W. Geißendörfer	Cemetery of Splendour	Rak Ti Khon Kaen
2015	(Korea) Lee Im-kul	End Of Winter	Cheol Won Gi-Haeng
2015	(Japan) (France) Endo Hitoshi, Matsuda Hiroko, Masa Sawada	Journey to the Shore	岸辺の旅
2015	(Taiwan) (China) (Hong Kong) Hou Hsiao-hsien	The Assassin	
2015	(Korea) Park Jung-bum, Kim Youngjin, Jang Byungwon, Lee Sangyong, Park Hongsik	Alive	Sanda
2016	(Turkey) (Hungary) Nermin Aytekin	Cold of Kalandar	Kalandar Soğuğu
2016	(Russia) Ilya Stewart, Diana Safarova, Yury Kozyrev	The Student	Uchenik
2016	(Iran) Reza Mirkarimi	Daughter	Dokhtar
2016	(Iran) Majid Majidi, Mohammadreza Saberi	Muhammad: The Messenger of God	Muhammad Rasoulallah
2016	(Turkey) (Germany) Zeki Demirkubuz	Ember	Kor
2017	(Australia) Greer Simpkin, David Jowsey	Sweet Country	
2017	(China) (France) Sean Chen	Angels Wear White	Jia Nian Hua
2017	(Israel) (Germany) (France) (Switzerland) Michael Weber, Viola Fügen, Eitan Mansuri, Cedomir Kolar, Marc Baschet, Michel Merkt	Foxtrot	פוֹקְסטְרוֹט
2017	(France) (Germany) (Lithuania) (Netherlands) Marianne Slot	A Gentle Creature	Unne eamem Doueh
2017	(Iran) Mohammad Rasoulof	A Man of Integrity	Lerd
2018	(Japan) Kore-eda Hirokazu, Matsuzaki Kaoru, Yose Akihiko, Taguchi Hijiri	Shoplifters	Manbiki Kazoku
2018	(Philippines) Achinette Villamor, Edong Canlas, Khavn De La Cruz	Balangiga: Howling Wilderness	
2018	(Korea) Lee Chang-dong, Lee Joon-dong	Burning	
2018	(Thailand) (China) (France) Phuttiphong Aroonpheng, Mai Meksawan, Philippe Avril, Jakrawal Nilthamrong, Chatchai Chaiyon	Manta Ray	Kraben Rahu
2018	(Kazakhstan) (France) Adilkhan Yerzhanov, Serik Abishev, Olga Khlasheva	The Gentle Indifference of the World	Laskovoe Bezrazlichie Mira
2019	(Korea) Kwak Sin-ae and Bong Joon-ho	Parasite	기생충
2019	(China) Huang Xufeng, Jacky Pang Yee Wah	Balloon	气球
2019	(Russia) Alexander Rodnyansky, Sergey Melkumov	Beanpole	Дылда
2019	(India) Akshay Singh, Ridham Janve	The Gold-Laden Sheep and The Sacred Mountain	
2019	(China) Xuan Liu	So Long, My Son	地久天长
2025; 18th	( (Iran) (Luxembourg) (France) ) Directed by Jafar Panahi; Produced by Jafar Panahi, Philippe Martin	It Was Just an Accident	یک تصادف ساده
2025; 18th	( (France) (Portugal) (Spain) (Philippines) (Taiwan) ) Directed by Lav Diaz; Produced by Joaquim Sapinho, Marta Alves, Albert Serra, Montse Triola, Paul Soriano, Mark Victor	Magellan	Magalhães
2025; 18th	( (Indonesia) ) Directed by Garin Nugroho; Produced by Gita Fara	Samsara	
2025; 18th	( (China) ) Directed by Cai Shangjun; Produced by Ma Shuang, Huang Titi, Justine O.	The Sun Rises on Us All	日掛中天
2025; 18th	( (Japan) ) Directed by Sho Miyake; Produced by Masayoshi Johnai	Two Seasons, Two Strangers	旅と日々
