= Asia Pacific Screen Award for Best Cinematographer =

The Asia Pacific Screen Award for Best Cinematographer formerly known as the Asia Pacific Screen Award for Achievement in Cinematography, is an award category of the annual Asia Pacific Screen Awards.

The winners and nominees of this category are:

== Winners and nominees ==
=== 2000s ===
Year	Winner and nominees	English title	Original title
2007	(Iran) Hooman Behmanesh	Those Three	An Seh
2007	(China) Wang Yu	The Go Master	呉清源 / Wu Qingyuan
2007	(China) Fei Zhao, Mark Lee Ping-bing, Tao Yang	The Sun Also Rises	太阳照常升起
2007	(Sri Lanka) Palitha Perera	Sankara	සංඛාරා
2007	(Russia) Sergey Trofimov	Mongol	
2008	(South Korea) Lee Mogae	The Good, the Bad, the Weird	좋은 놈, 나쁜 놈, 이상한 놈 / Jo-eun nom nappeun nom isanghan nom
2008	(India) Kiiran Deohans	Jodhaa Akbar	
2008	(Turkey) Gökhan Tiryaki	Three Monkeys	Üç Maymun
2008	(Russia) Oleg Kirichenko	Mermaid	Rusalka
2008	(Hong Kong) Cheng Siu-keung	Sparrow	文雀
2009	(China) Cao Yu	City of Life and Death	南京! 南京!
2009	(Russia) Alexei Arsentiev	Wolfy	Volchok
2009	(Russia) Alisher Khamidhodjaev, Maxin Drozdov	Paper Soldier	Bumaznyj Soldat
2009	(Iran) Ali Mohammad Ghasemi	A Light In The Fog	Cheraghi Dar Meh
2009	(Thailand) Uruphong Raksasad	Agrarian Utopia	Sawan Baan Na

=== 2010s ===
Year	Winner and Nominees	English title	Original title
2010	(India) Sudheer Palsane	The Well	विहीर / Vihir
2010	(Turkey) Bariş Özbicer	Honey	Bal
2010	(China) Lu Yue	Aftershock	唐山大地震
2010	(United States) Jake Pollock	Mengjia	艋舺
2010	(India) Santosh Sivan, V. Manikandan	Raavan	रावण
2011	(Turkey) Gökhan Tiryaik	Once Upon A Time In Anatolia	Bir Zamanlar Anadolu’da
2011	(Taiwan) Mark Lee Ping Bin	Norwegian Wood	ルウェイの森 / Noruwei no mori
2011	(Russia) Yuri Klimenko	The Edge	Край / Krai
2011	(China) Sonthar Gyal	Old Dog	Khyi Rgan
2011	(Russia) Vladimir Bashta	Brest Fortress	Брестская крепость / Brestskaia Krepost
2012	(Iran) Touraj Aslani	Rhino Season	فصل کرگدن / Fasle Kargadan
2012	(Thailand) Charin Pengpanich	Bunohan: Return to Murder	Bunohan
2012	(United States) Jake Pollock (China) Lai Yiu-fai	Wu Xia	武俠
2012	(Taiwan) Chin Ting-chang	Warriors of the Rainbow	賽德克·巴萊 / Seediq Bale
2012	(Russia) Yury Raysky	The Horde	Орда / Orda
2013	(China) Lu Yue	Back to 1942	一九四二
2013	(Palestine) Ehad Assal	Omar	عمر
2013	(Australia) Mandy Walker	Tracks	
2013	(Kyrgyzstan) Murat Aliyev	The Old Man	Shal
2013	(India) Rajeev Ravi	Monsoon Shootout	
2014	(China) Dong Jinsong	Black Coal, Thin Ice	白日焰火
2014	(China) Zeng Jian	Blind Massage	推拿
2014	(Russia) Mikhail Krichman	Leviathan	Левиафан / Leviafan
2014	(Russia) Levan Kapanadze	Test	Ispytanie
2014	(Kazakhstan) Yerkinbek Ptyraliyev	The Owners	
2015	(Taiwan) Mark Lee Ping-bing	The Assassin	刺客聶隱娘 / Nie Yinniang
2015	(France) Jean-Marc Ferrière	Sunrise	अरुणोदय / Arunoday
2015	(China) Miaoyan Zhang	A Corner of Heaven	Tiantang Jiaoluo
2015	(China) Lyu Songye	Tharlo	
2015	(Kyrgyzstan) Murat Aliyev	Stranger	Жат / Zhat
2016	(Turkey) Cevahir Şahin, Kürşat Üresin	Cold of Kalandar	Kalandar Soğuğu
2016	(India) Jay Oza	Psycho Raman	Raman Raghav 2.0
2016	(China) Wang Tianxing	Kaili Blues	路边野餐 / Lu Bian Ye Can
2016	(Spain) Gorka Gómez Andreu	House of Others	სხვისი სახლი / Skhvisi Skhli
2016	(Italy) Vittorio Storaro	Muhammad: The Messenger of God	Muhammad Rasoulallah
2016	(Taiwan) Mark Lee Ping-bing	Crosscurrent	长江图 / Chang Jiang Tu
2017	(Russia) Pyotr Dukhovskoy, Timofey Lobov	The Bottomless Bag	Meshok Bez Dna
2017	(Georgia (country)) Mindia Esadze	Scary Mother	Sashishi Deda
2017	(China) Lyu Songye	Ghost in the Mountains	Kong Shan Yi Ke
2017	(India) Shehnad Jalal	Lady of the Lake	Loktak Lairembee
2017	(Australia) Warwick Thornton, Dylan River	Sweet Country	
2018	(Japan) Hideho Urata	A Land Imagined	
2018	(India) Saumyananda Sahi	Balekempa	
2018	(Thailand) Chaiyapruek Chalermpornpanit	Malila: The Farewell Flower	
2018	(Thailand) Nawarophaat Rungphiboonsophit	Manta Ray	
2018	(China) (China) Zhang Miaoyan, Xu Zhiyong	Silent Mist	
2019	(Russia) Ksenia Sereda	Beanpole	Дылда
2019	(China) Yu Ninghui, Xu Deng	Dwelling in the Fuchun Mountains	
2019	(Iran) Saurabh Monga	The Gold-Laden Sheep & the Sacred Mountain	
2019	(Malaysia) Teoh Gay Hian	The Science of Fictions	
2019	(South Korea) Kim Hyunseok	So Long, My Son	
