= Asia Pacific Screen Award for Best Documentary Film =

The Asia Pacific Screen Award for Best Documentary Film, formerly known as the Asia Pacific Screen Award for Best Documentary Feature Film, is an award category of the annual Asia Pacific Screen Awards.

== 2000s ==
Year	Winner and nominees	English title	Original title
2007	(Lebanon) Mai Masri, Jean Chamoun	Beirut Diaries: Truth, Lies and Videos	Yaoumiyat Beirut: Hakaek wa Akatheeb
2007	(China) Gao Feng	A Great Master Re-Captured	You Jian Mei Lan Fang
2007	(Iran) Vahid Mousaine Simani	The Lost Land	Sarzamine Gomshodeh
2007	(Armenia) Vardan Hovhannisyan	A Story of People in War and Peace	
2007	(Malaysia) Tan Chui Mui, Amir Muhammad	Village People Radio Show	Apa Khabar Orang Kampung
2008	(South Korea) Kim Dong-won, Lee SeungGu	63 Years On	Ggeutnaji Anhmeun Jeon Jaeng
2008	(Palestine) Mai Masri (Qatar) Mohammad Belhaj (Lebanon) Jean Chamoun	33 Days	33 Yaoum
2008	(Indonesia) Setiawan Djody, Erros Djarot, Gotot Prakosa	Kantata Takwa	Kantata Takwa
2008	(New Zealand) Vincent Ward, Marg Slater, Tainui Stephens	Rain of the Children	
2008	(Iran) Mahdi Moniri	Tinar	
2009	(Israel) (Austria) (Denmark) (United States) Knut Ogris, 'Karoline Leth, Sandra Itkoff, Philippa Kowarsky'	Defamation	Hashmatsa
2009	(Thailand) Ing K, Manit Sriwanichpoom, Kraisak Choonhavan	Citizen Juling	Polamuang Juliang
2009	(Australia) David MacDougall	Gandhi's Children	
2009	(United States) (Japan) Kazuhiro Soda	Mental	Seishin
2009	(France) (Cambodia) Gerard Lacroix, Leslie F. Grunberg, Gerard Pont	Survive, in the Heart of the Khmer Rouge Madness	L'Important, c'est de Rester Vivant

== 2010s ==
Year	Winner and nominees	English title	Original title
2010	(China) (Canada) Mila Aung-Thwin, Daniel Cross	Last Train Home	
2010	(Lebanon) Zeina Daccache	12 Angry Lebanese: The Documentary	
2010	(Palestine) (Israel) (United States) Ronit Avni, Julia Bacha, Rula Salameh	Budrus	
2010	(Cambodia) (United Kingdom) Robert Lemkin, Thet Sambath	Enemies of the People	
2010	(China) Zhu Rikun	Karamay	
2011	(Sweden) (Japan) (United States) Maryam Ebrahimi	I Was Worth 50 Sheep	Jag var värd 50 lamm
2011	(Iran) (South Korea) (Canada) (Ukraine) Shahin Parhami	Amin	
2011	(United Kingdom) (India) Amber Latiff, Girjashanker Vohra	Pink Saris	
2011	(United Kingdom) (India) (United States) Gemma Atwal, Matt Norman	Marathon Boy	
2011	(Georgia (country)) (Germany) Anna Dziapshipa	Bakhmaro	
2012	(Iraq) (United Kingdom) (Netherlands) Isabelle Stead, Mohamed Jabarah Al-Daradji, Atia Jabarah Al-Daradji	In My Mother's Arms	
2012	(Israel) (Palestine) (France) Christine Camdessus, Serge Gordey, Emad Burnat, Guy Davidi	Five Broken Cameras	Hams Caeraten Maksura /Hamesh Matzlemot Shvurot
2012	(Germany) (Indonesia) Shalahuddin Siregar	The Land Beneath the Fog	Neger di Bawah Kabut
2012	(Israel) (United States) (Germany) Liran Atzmor	The Law in These Parts	Shiton hachok
2012	(South Korea) (Japan) (Finland) Kim Min-chul, Gary Kam	Planet of Snail - High Commendation	
2013	(Denmark) (Norway) (United Kingdom) Joshua Oppenheimer, Signe Byrge Sørensen, Joram Ten Brink, Christine Cynn, Anne Köhncke, Michael Uwemedimo	The Act of Killing	
2013	(Israel) (France) (Germany) (Belgium) Dror Moreh, Estelle Fialon, Phillipa Kowarsky	The Gatekeepers	
2013	(India) (Singapore) Amit Virmani, Seah Kui Luan	Menstrual Man	
2013	(Sweden) (Japan) (Netherlands) (Denmark) Maryam Ebrahimi	No Burqas Behind Bars	
2013	(Lebanon) (United Kingdom) (United Arab Emirates) (Denmark) (Palestine) Patrick Campbell, Mahdi Fleifel	A World Not Ours	
2014	(Iraq) Tara Karimi	1001 Apples	Hezar-O Yek Siv
2014	(India) Surabhi Sharma	Bidesia In Bambai	
2014	(South Korea) Kim Mi-re	Sanda: Surviving	Sanda
2014	(Syria) (France) Serge Lalou, Camille Laumié, Orwa Nyrabia, Diana El Jeiroudi	Slivered Water, Syria Self-Portrait	Eau Agentée, Syrie Autoportrait
2014	(Singapore) James Leong, Lynn Lee	Wukan: The Flame of Democracy	Wukan: Minzu Zhi Guang
2015	(China) Zhao Qi, Zhou Hao	The Chinese Mayor	Datong
2015	(Pakistan) (United States) Jonathan Goodman Levitt, Hemal Trivedi	Among The Believers	
2015	(Australia) Molly Reynolds, Peter Djigirr, Rolf de Heer	Another Country	
2015	(Iraq) Bahman Ghobadi	A Flag Without A Country	
2015	(Indonesia) (Denmark) (Norway) (Finland) (United Kingdom) Signe Byrge Sørensen	The Look of Silence	Senyap
2016	(Iran) Mehrdad Oskouei	Starless Dreams	Royahaye Dame Sobh
2016	(Myanmar) (Taiwan) Wang Shin-hong, Midi Z, Isabella Ho, Lin Sheng-wen	City of Jade	Fei Cui Zhi Cheng
2016	(Cambodia) (France) Catherine Dussart	Exile	Exil
2016	(Australia) (Norway) Lizzette Atkins, George Gittoes	Snow Monkey	
2016	(Russia) (North Korea) (Czech Republic) (Germany) (Latvia) Natalya Manskaya	Under The Sun	V Luchakh Solnca
2017	(Syria) (Denmark) (Germany) Søren Steen Jespersen, Kareem Abeed, Stefan Kloos	Last Men in Aleppo	
2017	(New Zealand) Alexander Behse; Co-Produced by Annie Goldson	Kim Dotcom: Caught in the Web	
2017	(Australia) (Papua New Guinea) Rebecca Barry, Madeleine Hetherton, Hollie Fifer	The Opposition	
2017	(Germany) (Lebanon) (Syria) (United Arab Emirates) (Qatar) Ansgar Prerich, Eva Kemme, Tobias N. Siebert	Taste of Cement	
2017	(China) Xu Feixue, Lu Zhixin, Zhang Jun	A Yangtze Landscape	Changjiang
2018	(Australia) Paul Damien Williams, Shannon Swan	Gurrumul	
2018	(Egypt) (Lebanon) (Qatar) (France) (Germany) (Norway) (Denmark) Mohamed Siam, Myriam Sassine	Amal	
2018	(Syria) (Lebanon) (Qatar) (Germany) Talal Derki, Ansgar Frerich, Eva Kemme, Tobias N. Siebert, Hans Robert Eisenhauer	Of Fathers and Sons	
2018	(Japan) (United Kingdom) (France) Hikaru Toda, Elhum Shakerifar	Of Love & Law	
2018	(India) Anushka Meenakshi, Iswar Srikumar, Manas Malhotra	Up Down & Sideways	kho ki pa lü
2019	(Israel) (Canada) (Switzerland) Philppe Bellaïche, Rachel Leah Jones, Paul Cadieux, Joëlle Bertossa	Advocate	
2019	(United Kingdom) (Germany) (Denmark) Viktor Kossakovsky, Aimara Reques, Heino Deckert, Sigrid Dyekjær	Aquarela	
2019	(Australia) (United Kingdom) Daniel Gordon, Sarah Thomson, Nick Batzias, Virginia Whitwell, John Battsek	The Australian Dream	
2019	(Iran) Negar Eskandarfar, Farzad Khoshdast	Narrow Red Line	
2019	(China) (United States) Nanfu Wang, Jialing Zhang, Julie Goldman, Christoph Jörg, Christopher Clements, Carolyn Hepburn	One Child Nation	
