= List of Indonesian Asia Pacific Screen Award winners and nominees =

This is a list of Indonesian Asia Pacific Screen Awards winners and nominees. This list details the performances of Indonesian actors, actresses, and films that have either been submitted or nominated for, or have won, an Asia Pacific Screen Award.

== Awards and nominations ==
Year (Ceremony)	Award	Recipient	Result	Note	Ref.
2007 (1st)	Best Feature Film	Opera Jawa	Nominated		
2007 (1st)	Best Children's Feature Film	Denias, Senandung Di Atas Awan	Won		
2008 (2nd)	Best Documentary Feature Film	Kantata Takwa	Nominated		
2009 (3rd)	Best Children's Feature Film	Pesantren: 3 Wishes 3 Loves	Nominated		
2012 (6th)	Best Documentary Feature Film	The Land Beneath the Fog	Nominated		
2012 (6th)	Best Children's Feature Film	The Mirror Never Lies	Won		
2013 (7th)	Best Documentary Feature Film	The Look of Silence	Won	Indonesian-Norwegian-British-Danish co-production	
2015 (9th)	Best Documentary Feature Film	The Look of Silence	Nominated	Indonesian-Finnish-Danish-British-Norwegian co-production	
2017 (11th)	Best Director	Mouly Surya; Marlina the Murderer in Four Acts	Nominated		
2017 (11th)	Best Actress	Cut Mini; Athirah	Nominated		
2017 (11th)	Best Youth Feature Film	The Seen and Unseen	Won	Indonesian-Dutch-Australian-Qatari co-production	
2018 (12th)	Cultural Diversity Award (UNESCO)	Memories of My Body	Won		

- Nominations – 12
- Wins – 5

== See also ==
- List of Indonesian submissions for the Academy Award for Best International Feature Film
