= Vartul =

Vartul (Film)
- Official film poster
- Directed by: Santosh Ram
- Written by: Santosh Ram
- Produced by: Vivek Chitra Production & Mokal Films
- Starring: Ashwini Giri, Chinmay Patwardhan, Ajinkya Bhise
- Cinematography: Pravin Mokal
- Edited by: Vinod Borate
- Music by: Shrirang Umrani
- Distributed by: Vivek Chitra Production
- Release date: 2009
- Running time: 19 minutes
- Language: Marathi
- Budget: 11000USD

Vartul (Marathi: वर्तुळ; translation: Circle) is a 2009 Indian short film written and directed by Santosh Ram and produced by Vivek Chitra Production & Mokal Films.

== Production ==
The leading cast of the movie consisted of Ashwini Giri, Chinmay Patwardhan, Ajinkya Bhise and Shailesh Shankar Kulkarni. The production of the film commenced in May 2008 and was completed in July 2009. The crew were selected by Vivek Chitra Production. The movie was shot in Bhor Maharashtra on a very tight budget. The crew faced various difficulties due to the shoestring budget.

== Plot ==
The movie revolves around Damu, a 10-year-old boy. There is a festival so mother wants to make Sweet. Mother asks Damu to go to shop and bring the jagarry. Damu has to take the money from the box, but he observes that there is no more money other than one coin left in the box. He leaves his home to buy Jagarry. On the way, he meets his friend Ganya. Ganya proposes for a race and Damu immediately accepts it. On the way to shop they stop at a Bioscopewallah. Ganya wants to watch the show of Bioscopewallah and he asks Damu to join him. Damu realizes that he does not have enough money, he wants to watch the show but he has to deny it. Damu realizes that he does not have enough money and he has to go to the shop and bring the Jagarry for the sweets. After the show Damu curiously asks Ganya about it. Ganya narrates the things to Damu on the bicycle ride they enjoy together.

Someone from the corner shouts for Ganya and asks him to join the game. Ganya and Damu leave the bicycle side of the road. They go there and see that Ganya's friends are playing game of money. The game is you have to hit a coin with a stone slab. Ganya joins the game. Everyone is winning the money this greed takes him to play a game. Damu decides to earn some quick money by playing the game. He starts playing the game. Beginners luck works in the case of Damu. Initially he wins the games and his greed for money grows more.

After the game, Damu goes to the shop. Damu asks the shopkeeper to give him the jaggery. The shopkeeper gives him the jaggery and in exchange of that Damu puts money in the hands of the shopkeeper. The shopkeeper looks at the defaced coin and tells Damu that the coin doesn't work. Damu requests shopkeeper but the shopkeeper asks for different coin. Now Damu walks back with tearful eyes.

== Cast ==
- Aswini Giri - Mother
- Chinmay Patwardhan - Damu
- Ajinkya Bhise - Manya
- Kalyan Gadgil - Kallya
- Aakash Giri - Akya
- Shivam Chetan Moray - Shivya
- Anant Shankar Salunke - Antya
- Jayesh Dikhale - Jivnya
- Rohan Choudhari - Rohnya
- Karan Lokhande - Dinya
- Shailesh Shankar Kulkarni - Shopkeeper
- Vinod Anand Kamble - Villager
- Vijay Kadam - Bioscopewallah

== Crew ==
- Story, Screenplay: Santosh Ram
- Producers: Ramchandra Pundlikrao Marewad, Mokal Brothers
- Editor: Vinod Gama Borate
- Cinematography: Pravin Mokal
- Music: Shrirang Umrani
- Editor: Vinod Gama Borate
- Art Director: Santosh Sankhad
- Re-recording: Mahesh Limaye
- Costume Design: Sonali Santosh Sankhad
- Sound recordist: Rashi Butee
- Promo Editor: Vaibhav Dabhade

== Awards and recognition ==
Since its world premiere in July 2009, the film has been selected for 50 national and international film festivals across the world, winning thirteen awards.

Festival/Awards	Category	Result
4th International Short Film Festival of India 2010, Chennai	Best Film	Won
2nd International Film Festival Nagpur 2011	Best Film	Won
Pune Short Film Festival 2011, Pune	Best Director	Won
Bengal Web Fair Short & Documentary Film Festival 2013, Kolkata	Best Cinematographer	Won
6th Goa Marathi Film Festival 2013, Goa	Best Film	Won
Malabar Short Film Festival 2013, Calicut	Best Children Film	Won
Lakecity International Short Film Festival 2013, Bhopal	Best Child Actor	Won
Kanyakumari International Film Festival 2013, Kanyakumari	Appreciation Award for Excellence in Film making	Won
Navi Mumbai International Film Festival 2014, Navi Mumbai	Jury Special Mention	Won
2nd Darbhanga International Film Festival 2014	Best Actor	Won
2nd Darbhanga International Film Festival 2014	Best Cinematographer	Won
Barshi Short Film Festival 2014	Best Film	Won
1st Maharashtra Short Film Festival 2014	Best Film	Won
Mahrashtra Times Awards 2010	Nominated	Nominated

== List of officially selected film festivals ==
- 1. 2nd Nashik International Film Festival 2009, Nashik, India
- 2. Third Eye 8th Asian Film Festival 2009, Mumbai, India
- 3. 11th Osian's Cinefan Festival of Asian and Arab Cinema 2009, New Delhi, India
- 4. 7th Kalpanirjhar International Short Fiction Film Festival, Kolkata, India
- 5. 8th Pune International Film Festival 2010, Pune, India
- 6. 2nd Jaipur International Film Festival 2010, Jaipur, India
- 7. 9th International Social Communication Cinema Conference 2010, Kolkata, India
- 8. The Fourth National Short And Documentary Film Festival 2010, Karimnagar A.P., India
- 9. ViBGYOR Film Festival 2010, Thrissur, Kerla, India
- 10. Kala Ghoda Arts Festival 2010, Mumbai (India)
- 11. 2nd CMS International Children's Film Festival (6–12 April 2010), Lucknow, India
- 12. 2nd Thendhisai International Short Film Festival of Madurai 2010, Tamil Nadu, India
- 13. Third Eye 2nd Asian Film Festival 2010, Kolhapur, India
- 14. 12th Madurai International Documentary and Short Film Festival 2010 (opening film)
- 15. Ankur Film Festival 2010, Nashik, India
- 16. Fourth International Short Film Festival of India 2010, Chennai, India
- 17. 3rd International Documentary and Short Film Festival Of Kerala, 2010, India
- 18. SCRIPT International Short Film Festival 2011, Kochi, India
- 19. 2nd International Film Festival Nagpur 2011, Nagpur, India
- 20. 1st Guwahati International Short Film Festival, 2011 Guwahati (India)
- 21. Pune Short Film Festival 2011 (India )
- 22. Pu La Utsav 2011 Pune (India)
- 23. International Short Film Festival 2011, Bhubaneswar, India
- 24. Gujarat International Short Film Festival 2011, Surat, India
- 25. 5th Chinh India Kids Film Festival 2011, New Delhi, India
- 26. Dada Saheb Phalke Film Festival-2012, Greater Noida, India.
- 27. FFSI Short & Documentary Film Festival 2012 Kolkata (India ).
- 28. 4th Lahore International Children's Film Festival 2012 (Pakistan ).
- 29. Jagran Film Festival 2012 (India ).
- 30. IGNITE Short Film Festival 2013, Vijayawada, Andhra Pradesh, India
- 31. 6th Filmsaaz, an International film festival of short films and documentaries 2013. (India ).
- 32. Tinsukia Orange Film Festival 2013
- 33. ICONOCLAST-2013 National short film festival Mumbai (India )
- 34. 6th Goa Marathi Film Festival 2013 (India)
- 35. The Art Factory: Sunday Flix, A new independent film series 2013 Paterson, NJ (USA)
- 36. Malabar Short Film Festival 2013, Calicut (India)
- 37. International Film Festival Of Kanyakumari 2013 (India)
- 38. No Gloss Film Festival 2013, Leeds, UK.
- 39. Lakecity International Short Film Festival 2013 (India)
- 40. South Texas Underground Film Festival 2013, Texas (USA)
- 41. Free Spirit Film Festival 2013, McLeod Ganj, Himachal Pradesh (India )
- 42. 17th Toronto Reel Asian International Film Festival 2013 (Canada)
- 43. The 9th Annual Free Spirit Film Festival 2013, McLeod Ganj ( India )
- 44. Midnapore International Film Festival 2013, West Bengal (India)
- 45. 4th International Random Film Festival 2013, Garpenberg (Sweden )
- 46. 2nd Shaan-e-awadh International Film Festival 2013 Lucknow, India.
- 47. Navi Mumbai International Film Festival 2014 Navi Mumbai, India.
- 48. 9th Children's India International Children's Film Festival 2014, Bangalore (India).
- 49. Darbhanga International Film Festival 2014, Darbhanga (India).
- 50. Barshi Short Film Festival 2014 (India).
- 51. Warnanagar Short Film Festival 2014 (India )
- 52. 5th National Show of Independent Cinema "Otros Cines", San Nicolas (Argentina) 2014.
- 53. 1st Maharashtra Short Film Festival 2014 (India).
- 54. 1st Goa Short Film Festival 2014 (India).
