= Unconverted long-term prisoners =

North Korean term for northern loyalists imprisoned in South Korea

- North Korean name
- Hangul: 비전향 장기수
- Hanja: 非轉向長期囚
- Lit.: not-yet-converted long-term prisoners
- RR: bijeonhyang janggisu
- MR: pijŏnhyang changgisu

South Korean name
- Hangul: 미전향 장기수
- Hanja: 未轉向長期囚
- RR: mijeonhyang janggisu
- MR: mijŏnhyang changgisu

"Unconverted long-term prisoners" is the North Korean term for northern loyalists imprisoned in South Korea who never renounced Juche. The North Korean government considers them to be "pro-reunification patriotic fighters", while South Korean scholars have described them as "pro-communist spies".

== History ==
In March 1998, South Korean president Kim Dae-jung declared an amnesty for long-term prisoners over the age of 70, as well as some suffering from disease. In February 1999, President Kim declared another amnesty for 17 unconverted long-term prisoners. In 2000, as part of the June 15th North–South Joint Declaration, 63 of the prisoners were permitted to settle in North Korea. There were hopes that North Korea would reciprocate by releasing Southern prisoners of war still detained in the North. A number of them left behind family members in the South; the South's Ministry of Unification refused permission to let the family members go north with them. They crossed the border by bus through the truce village of Panmunjom at 10 AM on 2 September 2000, while a group of Southern protesters decried their return and demanded that the North return abducted Southerners; they were welcomed on the Northern side by a reception with a brass band playing revolutionary songs, and each was later awarded the National Reunification Prize.

== In literature and film ==
A book about their experiences was published in North Korea in 2001. In 2003, South Korean director Kim Dong-won released Repatriation, a documentary about the unconverted prisoners, based on more than 12 years and 800 hours of filming.

== List of prisoners who crossed over to North Korea in 2000 ==
Following is a list of the 63 prisoners who went to North Korea in 2000.

Personal names are given in McCune–Reischauer romanisation of the Northern spelling (thus surnames are spelled Ri instead of Yi, Ryu instead of Yu, etc.); place names are given in McCune–Reischauer without diacritics for places now in North Korea, and Revised Romanisation for places now in South Korea.

Name	Hangul	Hanja	Birth/death dates	Place of birth	Province of birth	Years in prison	Notes
Kang Tong-gŭn	강동근		19 November 1916; 12 February 2004 (aged 87)	Hadong	Gyeongsangnam-do	37	Obituary published by KCNA
Kim Tong-gi	김동기	金東基 or 金東起	19 November 1932	Tanchon	South Hamgyong	34	Interviewed by Kyunghyang Shinmun before his repatriation. Published a book of essays about his experiences (새는 앉는 곳마다 깃을 남긴다, ISBN 978-89-88996-04-1). Two different hanja versions of his name have been reported in the media. Birthdate given as 19 October 1932 in 70th birthday congratulations published by KCNA. In August 2005, the KCNA reported in that he gave a speech to a visiting group of students from the Chongryon-affiliated Korea University.
Kim Myŏng-su	김명수		1 May 1922	Hamhung	South Hamgyong	37	80th birthday congratulations published by KCNA
Kim Sŏk-hyŏng	김석형		18 March 1914; 14 August 2006 (aged 92)	Pakchon	North Pyongan	30	Also spelled Kim Suk-hyung. One of the prisoners featured in the film Repatriation. Obituary published by KCNA.
Kim Sŏn-myŏng	김선명		20 February 1925	Yangpyeong	Gyeonggi-do	45	Also spelled Kim Sun-myung. Joined the Korean People's Army due to disgust over the prevalence of Japanese collaborators in the South Korean administration. Captured on 15 October 1951, and sentenced to death; sentence commuted to life imprisonment. Family refused to see him; had him declared legally dead in 1975. Released in 1995. Blind due to cataracts left untreated by prison doctors. His experiences were the basis for the 2002 film The Road Taken, starring Kim Jung-gi.
Kim Yŏng-dal	김영달		18 March 1934	Yeongdeok	Gyeongsangbuk-do	30	70th birthday congratulations published by KCNA
Kim Yŏng-man	김영만		15 November 1924	Gurye	Jeollanam-do	30	80th birthday congratulations published by KCNA. An essay of his was printed in the Rodong Sinmun in September 2008.
Kim Yŏng-tae	김영태		23 July 1931; 14 January 2008 (aged 76)	Kwaksan	North Pyongan	35	Also spelled Kim Yong-thae. Trapped in South Korea after the Korean War, and fought as a guerilla in the Jirisan area. Obituary published by KCNA.
Kim Yŏng-gyu	김용규		22 June 1923	Boseong	Jeollanam-do	34	80th birthday congratulations published by KCNA
Kim Yong-su	김용수		30 September 1931	Gyeongju	Gyeongsangbuk-do	27	KCNA gives his year of birth as 1932 in an announcement of his 70th birthday. An essay of his was printed in the Rodong Sinmun in June 2003.
Kim U-taek	김우택		28 October 1919	Andong	Gyeongsangbuk-do	40	90th birthday congratulations published by KCNA
Kim Ŭn-hwan	김은환		12 July 1930	Gwangju	Gyeonggi-do	31	Also spelled Kim Eun-hwan. Released in the February 1999 amnesty. Joined the Korean Painters' Union after moving to the North. 90th birthday congratulations published by Rodong Sinmun.
Kim Ik-jin	김익진		13 July 1932; 8 July 2008 (aged 75)	Yeongdeok	Gyeongsangbuk-do	31	Also known as Kim Il-jin. Released in the February 1999 amnesty. Obituary published by KCNA.
Kim In-su	김인수		18 November 1926	Tokchon	South Pyongan	34	In June 2001, KCNA reported that he gave a speech to a delegation of visiting students from Korea University of Japan.
Kim In-sŏ	김인서		27 May 1924; 17 August 2008 (aged 84)	Daegu	Gyeongsangbuk-do	36	Applied to resettle in the North in 1996, but was rejected. Obituary published by KCNA.
Kim Chong-ho	김종호		2 August 1916; 21 November 2003 (aged 87)	Gimcheon	Gyeongsangbuk-do	31	Obituary published by KCNA
Kim Chung-jong	김중종		2 April 1926	Gimcheon	Gyeongsangbuk-do	29	Received a doctorate in linguistics in 2003. 80th birthday congratulations published by KCNA.
Kim Chang-wŏn	김창원	金昌源	27 October 1934	Yeongdeungpo-gu	Seoul	31	70th birthday congratulations published by KCNA. An essay of his was printed in the Rodong Sinmun in April 2006. Interviewed by The Pyongyang Times in September 2008.
Ko Kwang-in	고광인	高光仁	5 January 1935	Gochang	Jeollabuk-do	34	An essay of his was printed in the Rodong Sinmun in May 2003. KCNA published 70th birthday congratulations in February 2005, but did not give a birthdate.
Ryu Un-hyŏng	류운형		26 December 1924; 22 November 2008 (aged 83)	Riwon	South Hamgyong	34	Prior to his arrest, held various political posts including head of the Youth Department of the Chorwon, Kangwon, Committee of the WPK and chief of the education section of the Information Department of the Kangwon Provincial Committee of the WPK. Obituary published by KCNA.
Ryu Yŏn-chŏl	류연철		13 February 1912	Andong	Gyeongsangbuk-do	27	KCNA gives his date of birth as 26 March 1912 in his 90th birthday announcement
Ryu Han-uk	류한욱		24 May 1911	Cholsan	North Pyongan	37	KCNA gives his year of birth as 1917 in his 90th birthday announcement
Ri Kyŏng-gu	리경구		4 March 1930	Gongju	Chungcheongnam-do	38	An essay of his was published in the Rodong Sinmun in June 2006. 80th birthday congratulations published by KCNA.
Ri Kyŏng-chan	리경찬	李京贊	15 November 1935		Kaesong	35	Joined the Korean Painters' Union after his return to the North. 70th birthday congratulations published by KCNA. Essays of his were printed in the Rodong Sinmun in February 2005 and December 2006.
Ri Kong-sun	리공순		3 December 1934	Seosan	Chungcheongnam-do	33	70th birthday congratulations published by KCNA. An essay of his was printed in the Rodong Sinmun in November 2006.
Ri Tu-gyun	리두균	李斗均	2 April 1926	Chungju	Chungcheongbuk-do	31	An essay of his was published in the Rodong Sinmun in October 2004. 80th birthday congratulations published by KCNA.
Ri Se-gyun	리세균		15 January 1922	Jeonju	Jeollabuk-do	30	80th birthday congratulations published by KCNA
Ri Chae-ryong	리재룡		3 October 1945	Yangyang	Gangwon-do	30	First daughter Ri Chuk-bok (리축복) born 24 July 2002, according to KCNA
Ri Jong	리종		9 August 1911	Yeongdong	Chungcheongbuk-do	25	Birth date stated as September 25, 1911 in 90th birthday congratulations published by KCNA. An essay of his was printed in the Rodong Sinmun in October 2006.
Ri Jong-hwan	리종환		7 October 1922; 30 April 2001 (aged 78)		Incheon	43	Obituary published by KCNA
Pak Mun-jae	박문재		14 September 1922		Kaesong	28	Imprisoned in Daejeon; released in 1993. Still alive as of 2004, according to KCNA.
Pak Wan-gyu	박완규		10 April 1929	Cheongwon	Chungcheongbuk-do	33	An essay of his was printed in the Rodong Sinmun in December 2006.
Pang Chae-sun	방재순		25 February 1917	Hoengseong	Gangwon-do	38	An essay of his was printed in the Rodong Sinmun in November 2006. 90th birthday congratulations published by KCNA.
Sŏk Yong-hwa	석용화		8 April 1925	Yangsan	Gyeongsangnam-do	20	Married to Lee Chun-ja of South Korea; two daughters. Left them behind to cross over to North Korea. 80th birthday congratulations published by KCNA.
Son Sŏng-mo	손성모	孫聖模	15 January 1930	Buan	Jeollabuk-do	19	Released in June 2000. An essay of his was printed in the Rodong Sinmun in July 2006. 80th birthday congratulations published by KCNA.
Song Sang-jun	송상준		29 July 1927		Busan	36	80th birthday congratulations published by KCNA
Sin Kwang-su	신광수	辛光洙	27 June 1929	Yangsan	Gyeongsangnam-do	15	Also spelled Shin Gwang-su. Born in Shizuoka, Japan according to some reports. Released in June 2000. Wanted in Japan for his alleged role in North Korean abductions of Japanese.
Sin Rin-su	신린수		1 April 1918	Cheongdo	Gyeongsangbuk-do	30	Worked in a coal mine in his youth. 90th birthday congratulations published in The Pyongyang Times.
Sin In-yŏng	신인영		6 December 1929	Buan	Jeollabuk-do	32	Also spelled Shin In-young. Served in the Korean People's Army during the Korean War; returned to the South as a spy and was arrested in 1967. Believed to have a wife, son, and two daughters in the North; his mother, Koh Bong-hee, continued to reside in the South. Imprisoned in Daejeon. Released in the March 1998 amnesty. Suffering from leukaemia. At the time of his release, he stated, "now I want to take care of my mother for the rest of her life". However, he bid farewell to her in 2000 and crossed over to North Korea with 62 other long-term prisoners, in a scene captured in Kim Dong-won's 2000 movie Repatriation. She died in 2002.
An Yong-gi	안영기		19 June 1929	Gumi	Gyeongsangbuk-do	38	Also spelled Ahn Young-gi. Prior to his arrest, designed the Okryu Restaurant in Pyongyang. Released in the February 1999 amnesty. Joined the Korean Painters' Union after his return to the North.
Yang Chŏng-ho	양정호		3 April 1931	Yangsan	Gyeongsangnam-do	31	Released in the February 1999 amnesty. Joined the Korean Painters' Union after moving to the North. An essay of his was published in the Rodong Sinmun in August 2004.
O Hyŏng-sik	오형식		24 January 1932; 3 September 2006 (aged 74)	Siheung	Gyeonggi-do	31	An essay of his was printed in the Rodong Sinmun in June 2006. Obituary published by KCNA.
U Ryong-gak	우용각	禹龍覺	29 November 1929; 7 December 2012 (aged 83)	Nyongbyon	North Pyongan	42	Also spelled Woo Yong-gak. Was captured in a North Korean commando raid in Southern waters in 1959. At the time of his release under Kim Dae-jung's amnesty in 1999, was believed to be the world's longest-serving political prisoner.
Yun Yong-gi	윤용기		2 August 1926; 13 June 2001 (aged 74)	Ganghwa	Gyeonggi-do	40	Obituary published by KCNA
Yun Hŭi-bo	윤희보		10 October 1917	Gwangju	Gyeonggi-do	25	90th birthday congratulations published by KCNA
Im Pyŏng-ho	임병호		1 September 1916	Boryeong	Chungcheongnam-do	32	An essay of his was printed in the Rodong Sinmun in December 2006.
Chang Pyŏng-rak	장병락		25 July 1934; 11 October 2009 (aged 75)	Kowon	South Hamgyong	38	Also spelled Jang Byong-lak. Released in the February 1999 amnesty. Obituary published by KCNA.
Jang Ho	장호		29 November 1920	Mapo-gu	Seoul	32	80th birthday congratulations published by KCNA. Gave a lecture to a visiting group of students from Korea University of Japan in October 2003. An essay of his entitled "Society and Morality" was published in the Rodong Sinmun in October 2005. 100th birthday congratulations published by Rodong Sinmun _{,} Pyongyang Times and KCNA, received a birthday spread from Kim Jong-un.
Chŏn Chin	전진		6 July 1923	Gunsan	Jeollabuk-do	38	80th birthday congratulations published by KCNA
Chŏn Ch'ang-gi	전창기		10 April 1918	Buyeo	Chungcheongnam-do	23	Also spelled Jon Chang-gi. 90th birthday congratulations published in The Pyongyang Times.
Cho Ch'ang-son	조창손		29 August 1929	Ryongyon	South Hwanghae	30	In poor health. Has a wife and two sons in the North.
Ch'oi Sŏn-muk	최선묵		1 July 1928	Ganghwa	Gyeonggi-do	38	Released in the February 1999 amnesty. Joined the Korean Painters' Union after moving to the North. An essay of his was published in the Rodong Sinmun in March 2005.
Ch'oi Su-il	최수일		25 May 1939	Uiju	North Pyongan	35	
Ch'oi Ha-jong	최하종		21 March 1927	Kimchaek	North Hamgyong	36	Joined the Korean Painters' Union after his return to the North. 80th birthday congratulations published by KCNA.
Han Paek-ryŏl	한백렬		16 February 1920; 13 May 2009 (aged 89)	Gwangju	Gyeonggi-do	23	Obituary published by KCNA
Han Chang-ho	한장호		1 May 1923	Myongchon	North Hamgyong	39	80th birthday congratulations published by KCNA
Han Chong-ho	한종호		31 January 1918	Hamhung	South Hamgyong	13	Left behind a son, Han Young-su. His wife did not attend his farewell. 90th birthday congratulations published by KCNA.
Han Chun-ik	한춘익		10 June 1925	Hamhung	South Hamgyong	29	80th birthday congratulations published by KCNA
Ham Se-hwan	함세환		12 December 1932	Ongjin	South Hwanghae	34	Applied for repatriation in 1993 (at the time of Ri In-mo's repatriation) and again in 1996, but was denied both times. The KCNA reports that a daughter was born to him on 19 March 2003. In December 2006, an essay of his was printed in the Rodong Sinmun.
Hong Kyŏng-sŏn	홍경선		21 May 1925	Cheonan	Chungcheongnam-do	33	80th birthday congratulations published by KCNA. An essay of his was printed in the Rodong Sinmun in December 2005.
Hong Myŏng-gi	홍명기		5 April 1929	Buyeo	Chungcheongnam-do	38	80th birthday congratulations published by KCNA
Hong Mun-gŏ	홍문거		14 September 1921		Pyongyang	37	80th birthday congratulations published by KCNA
Hwang Yong-gap	황용갑		28 May 1924	Hadong	Gyeongsangnam-do	35	Released in 1989. Married a woman surnamed Kim, but did not tell her about his past as a communist agent; she only learned of it in late 1999. 80th birthday congratulations published by KCNA. An essay of his was printed in the Rodong Sinmun in 2006.

== See also ==
- Ahn Hak-sop, an unconverted long-term prisoner that did not return to North Korea in 2000
- Americans in North Korea
- Cuban Five
- North Korean abductions of Japanese citizens
