= Iyad Burnat =

Palestinian activist

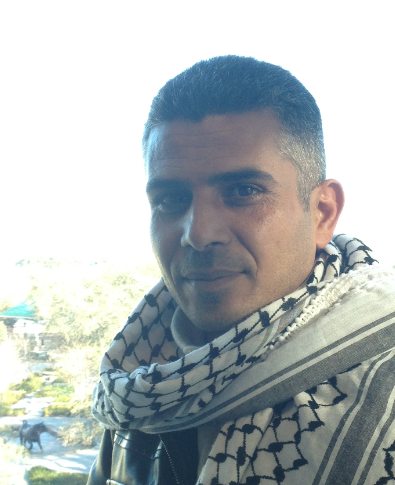
- Iyad Burnat in 2013
- Born: 12 September 1973 (age 53); Bil'in, Palestine
- Citizenship: Palestinian
- Occupations: Activist, filmmaker

Iyad Burnat (born September 1973) is a Palestinian activist who leads Bil'in's non-violent struggle in the West Bank. He is the head of the Bil'in Popular Committee against the Wall, which has led weekly demonstrations since 2005 against the Israeli West Bank barrier. He is also head of Friends of Freedom and Justice in Bil’in, a pro-Palestinian organization with the stated aims of building a "wide network of people from all over the globe who support Freedom and Justice for all"

== Activism ==
In 1990, at 17 years, Burnat was charged and sentenced for throwing stones at IDF soldiers and was jailed for two years. He has been arrested and imprisoned for non-violently protesting Israeli actions more than 10 times since.

In 2004, the Israeli military built a wall separating village farmers from their lands, removed 1000 olive trees and restricted travel in the name of protecting Israeli settlers. Since 2005, Bil'in villagers have been engaging in weekly Friday demonstrations against these activities, along with Israeli citizens and international peace activists. Burnat has been leading the demonstrations.

In September 2007 Israel's high court ruled that the wall on the outskirts of Bil'in unnecessarily interfered with the residents without offering any security advantage. Burnat said: "It's not easy for the Supreme Court to return land. This is a historic step...The steadfast peaceful resistance of the villagers of Bil'in resulted in the decision to partially remove the wall in the village." The Washington Times compared Burnat's philosophy of Palestinian protest tactics to the writings of Martin Luther King Jr. or Mahatma Gandhi.

In 2007 Burnat described his choice of nonviolent protest, saying "The belief in one's rights is more important than anything else. If I am confident about my rights, nothing will make me despair...When you resist an Israeli soldier by peaceful means, their weapons become irrelevant." The Christian Science Monitor reported that "the strategy paid off" when Israel's Supreme Court issued a ruling on the path of the fence around Bilin.

In November 2008 Burnat and a group of American peace activists were denied entry into the Palestinian town of Ni'lin. He later was arrested in a November 21 morning raid. He was fined and released in December 2008.

In the May 15, 2009 march, Iyad Burnat was severely injured along with eight others.

In March 2010, Burnat was questioned by officers from Shin Bet, Israel's internal security service, after he sent an emailed report about the previous weeks protests titled, "The Third Intifada is knocking on the door". That year he also was banned by the Shin Bet, for security reasons, from traveling to Europe to participate in two conferences.

In April 2010 Burnat organized, with Luisa Morgantini, the former vice president of the Italian parliament, the fifth annual Bil'in Conference on non-violent popular resistance against the fence and the settlements. Twenty-five foreign consuls and envoys took part in the conference, including representatives of the United Nations and the European Union. Palestinian Prime Minister Salam Fayyad and lawmaker Dr. Mustafa Barghouti spoke, as did French Parliament Member Jean Claude Lefort.

During a December 2010 protest, where activists dressed as the fictional blue-skinned, pointy-haired, long-tailed indigenous characters of the Na'vi tribe from the film Avatar, Burnat proclaimed partial victory in their protests. Per the Israeli court ruling, Israelis had begun preparations for the construction of the wall's new route which returns to the village 30 percent of its land. He said "We feel relieved and feel the non-violent resistance is successful in its aim." The Los Angeles Times quoted his saying: "Even getting back one inch is an accomplishment...But the wall is still being built on our land, and even the new route will cut down more of our trees. We are going to continue our fight against the wall until we move it all the way back to the 1967 line."

In the July 15, 2011 march, Burnat was injured by rubber-coated steel bullets after international and Israeli supporters joined the villagers in the protest. He led the August 31, 2012 weekly march, which included British Parliamentarians Martin Linton and John Lazman. It was done in solidarity with the family of Rachel Corrie.

== United States tour ==
Burnat went on a speaking tour of the United States to talk about the Israeli-Palestinian conflict from November 2012 to February 2013. He initially was denied permission from Jordan to board a flight to the United States. The National Lawyers Guild wrote a letter to the Jordan kingdom urging it to allow Burnat to travel from Amman to University of Michigan. After a week of continued protests, he was allowed to board a flight to Detroit, November 3, 2012. During his scheduled stopover in Frankfurt, Germany, he was further detained by U.S. agents and subjected to several hours of interrogation.

During a Tiffin, Ohio presentation, Burnat showed video clips of Israeli soldiers in riot gear pushing back and shooting rubber bullets and tear gas at unarmed demonstrators, beating an unarmed man, and using noise generation machines to drown out chants and disperse demonstrators. He also showed passive resistance protests of individuals chained to each other and to trees and fences. Burnat stated: "We are not against the Jewish. We are against the occupation." During some presentations he showed the film "5 Broken Cameras" about the struggle in Bil'in, made by his brother Emad Burnat, a farmer. The film won a Sundance Film Festival documentary award and Emad is the first Palestinian nominated for the Academy Award for Best Documentary Feature.

== Personal life ==
Iyad Burnat is married and has five children. Majd, Iyad's eldest son, was shot by an Israeli sniper in August 2014—he was seriously injured.

== Awards ==
Iyad was the recipient of the James Lawson Award for Achievement in the Practice of Nonviolent Conflict 2015.
