= Interrupted Streams =

Interrupted Stream
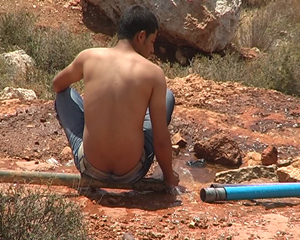
- Image from the film
- Directed by: Guy Davidi; Alexandre Goetschmann
- Produced by: Guy Davidi; Alexandre Goetschmann
- Cinematography: Guy Davidi; Alexandre Goetschmann
- Edited by: Guy Davidi; Alexandre Goetschmann
- Music by: Avner Gavrieli
- Release date: July 5, 2010 (Jerusalem Film Festival)
- Running time: 75 minutes
- Countries: Israel; Switzerland
- Languages: Arabic; Hebrew

Interrupted Streams Hebrew: זרמים קטועים Zramim Ktu'im) is a 2010 documentary film co-directed by Swiss Alexandre Goetschmann and Academy Award Nominee Israeli Guy Davidi.

== Synopsis ==
Paths of lives are crossed in one village in the West Bank. Along the broken water pipelines, villagers walk on their courses towards an indefinite future. Israel that controls the water, supplies only a small amount of water, and when the water streams are not certain nothing can evolve. The control over the water pressure not only dominates every aspect of life but also dominates the spirit. Bil'in, without spring water, is one of the first villages of the West Bank where a modern water infrastructure was set up. Many villagers took it as a sign of progress, others as a source of bitterness. The pipe-water was used to influence the people so they would co-operate with Israel's intelligence. The rip tore down the village. Returning to the ancient technique of collecting rainwater-using pits could be the villagers’ way to express independence but the relations between people will doubtfully be healed.

== Awards ==
The Film won the "David Silver Camera" Award of the Warsaw Jewish Film Festival.
