= Ahn Hak-sop =

North Korean former prisoner of war

- Born: 1930 (age 95–96); Ganghwa Island, Korea, Empire of Japan
- Spouse: Lee Chae-won
- Children: Jeong Mi-sook
- Military career
- Allegiance: North Korea
- Branch: Korean People's Army

Korean name
- Hangul: 안학섭
- RR: An Hakseop
- MR: An Haksŏp

Ahn Hak-sop (Korean: 안학섭; born 1930) is a North Korean former intelligence officer in the Korean People's Army and unconverted long-term prisoner. He was captured and tortured by the South Korean military during the Korean War in April 1953 and imprisoned for over 42 years. He has been unable to return to North Korea, and is an activist against American military presence in South Korea.

== Early life ==
Ahn Hak-sop was born on Ganghwa Island in 1930. He grew up under the Japanese occupation of Korea and felt betrayed after the Japanese surrender when Douglas MacArthur proclaimed that Korea south of the 38th parallel would be placed under American control. He believed that Korea had not been liberated but rather changed colonial hands, and he became an anti-American political activist.

Ahn was in school in Kaesong when the Korean War began in 1950. He enlisted in the Korean People's Army in 1952, serving in the intelligence department. In October 1952, he led a squad into South Korea to mobilize communist partisans to engage in guerilla warfare. His squad fought running battles and was repeatedly ambushed, and he was the last member alive in April 1953. He was captured by the Republic of Korea Army as he was cooking two potatoes.

== Life in South Korea ==
A South Korean military court sentenced Ahn to life in prison on espionage charges. He was tortured and kept in a small solitary cell. He would have been allowed to leave prison if he formally renounced his communist ideology, but he refused, and remained in prison for over 42 years. Ahn said that he endured torture such as flogging with knotted ropes, waterboarding with pepper-laced water, and being tied naked in a freezing room and dripped with freezing water.

Ahn was released in 1995 due to a special pardon granted by the South Korean government on the National Liberation Day of Korea. In 2000, the South Korean government repatriated 63 North Korean prisoners of war, but Ahn chose to stay in the South because he wanted to continue to protest against the American military presence in Korea. In 2004, a South Korean government panel acknowledged the deaths of 77 prisoners of war from torture. Another panel acknowledged that Ahn was a victim of torture.

In 2000, Ahn married a woman thirty years younger than him named Lee Chae-won and began working in an herbal medicine shop. He also has an adopted daughter named Jeong Mi-sook. In 2015, Ahn and Lee became homeless after being scammed of their savings and began living with a pastor named Lee Jeok. Ahn's adopted daughter is a papier-mâché artist and has created anti-American sculptures that Ahn keeps in his home.

In South Korea, Ahn attends small weekly rallies outside of the American embassy in Seoul, campaigning for the withdrawal of American troops from the peninsula. In July 2025, Ahn was hospitalized and recorded a video declaring his wish to return to North Korea before his death. He said that he does not want to be buried in what he calls a "colonial state". South Korean authorities told him that they have no avenues to communicate with the North Korean government, and that repatriation is only possible if the North Korean government reaches out. In August 2025, Ahn and supporters staged a symbolic march to the North Korean border to demand his repatriation.
