= Repatriation (film) =

- Film poster
- 송환 Songhwan
- Directed by: Kim Dong-won
- Written by: Kim Dong-won; Ryu Mi-rye
- Produced by: Kim Dong-won
- Starring: Jo Chang-son; Kim Suk-hyung
- Cinematography: Byun Young-joo; Kim Tae-il; Jung Chang-young; Jang Young-gil; Mun Jeong-hyeon
- Music by: Kim Dong-bum; Lee Ji-eun
- Production companies: Indiestory; P.U.R.N Production
- Release date: March 19, 2004
- Running time: 148 minutes
- Country: South Korea
- Language: Korean

Repatriation (Korean: 송환; Hanja: 送還; RR: Songhwan) is a 2004 South Korean documentary film that documents the lives of North Korean unconverted long-term prisoners imprisoned in the South for more than 30 years. They were finally set free in the 1990s when inter-Korean relations improved, and repatriated to the North.

It was presented with the Freedom of Expression Award at the 2004 Sundance Film Festival, the first time a Korean film has ever been presented with an award at the prestigious U.S. festival. It also won Best Documentary Award at the 19th Fribourg International Film Festival in 2005. A followup, The 2nd Repatriation (2차 송환) was released in 2022.

== Production ==
When the unconverted long-term prisoners imprisoned in South Korea, were released after more than 30 years, they moved to Bongchun-dong, filmmaker Kim Dong-won's village.

== Awards and nominations ==
Year	Award	Category	Recipient	Result
2004	Sundance Film Festival	Freedom of Expression Award	Repatriation	Won
2004	12th Chunsa Film Art Awards	Best Planning	Kim Dong-won	Won
2004	5th Busan Film Critics Awards	Special Jury Prize	Kim Dong-won	Won
2004	24th Korean Association of Film Critics Awards	Special Mention	Kim Dong-won	Won
2005	19th Fribourg International Film Festival	Best Documentary Award	Repatriation	Won
