= 63 Years On =

- Hangul: 끝나지 않은 전쟁
- RR: Kkeunnaji aneun jeonjaeng
- MR: Kkŭnnaji anŭn chŏnjaeng
- Directed by: Kim Dong-won
- Written by: Kim Ok-young
- Produced by: Lee Seung-gu
- Starring: Jan Ruff-O'Herne; Felicidad de los Reyes; Pilar Frias; Wei Shao Lan; Lee Soo-san
- Cinematography: Han Seong-su; Ku-ling Siegel
- Edited by: Kim Dong-won; Jeong Ji-weon
- Music by: Yim Jun-cheol
- Release date: July 2008 (Jeonju)
- Running time: 60 minutes
- Country: South Korea
- Language: Korean

63 Years On (Korean: 끝나지 않은 전쟁; RR: Kkeunnaji aneun jeonjaeng) is a 2008 South Korean documentary film about the comfort women who were enslaved by the Japanese military in stations across Asia during World War II.

It showed at the 2008 Jeonju International Film Festival, and went on to win Best Documentary Feature Film at the 2nd Asia Pacific Screen Awards in 2008.

== Production ==
The film documents the experiences of the comfort women who were enslaved by the Japanese military in stations across Asia during World War II.

It provides a historical investigation along with interviews with five victims, Jan Ruff-O'Herne (Holland), Felicidad de los Reyes (Philippines), Pilar Frias (Philippines), Wei Shao Lan (China) and Lee Soo-san (Korea), who reveal their experiences as survivors of the estimated 200,000 sex slaves from 13 different countries (Korea, China, Vietnam, Cambodia, Laos, Singapore, Malaysia, Philippines, Indonesia, Papua New Guinea, East Timor and Holland) used by the Japanese military during World War II.
