= Kareem Abeed =

Syrian film producer

- Born: 1984
- Occupation: film producer

Kareem Abeed is a Syrian film producer best known for his 2017 documentary Last Men in Aleppo for which he was co-nominated for Academy Award for Best Documentary Feature.

Abeed and his team, was not able to attend the 90th Academy Awards ceremony, as his visa was rejected in response to President Trump's Executive Order 13780.

== Filmography ==
- 2017: Last Men in Aleppo (documentary feature)
- 2017: One Day in Aleppo (documentary short)

== Awards and nominations ==
- Asia Pacific Screen Award for Best Documentary Feature Film - Won
- Academy Award for Best Documentary Feature - Nomination
