= Woo Yong-gak =

North Korean commando, imprisoned in South Korea

- Born: 29 November 1929; Nyongbyon County, Japanese Korea
- Died: 7 December 2012
- Occupation: Commando

Woo Yong-gak (29 November 1929 – 7 December 2012) was a North Korean commando who was released from incarceration in South Korea on 25 February 1999.

He served 40 years, 7 months and 13 days in prison as one of South Korea's unconverted long-term prisoners. It has also been said that he "spent 41 years in solitary confinement". He returned to North Korea in September 2000.

== Capture ==
Woo was captured during a North Korean commando raid in South Korea's east coast waters in 1958 while he participated as one of the raiders.

== Imprisonment ==
=== Purpose ===
After his conviction of espionage for North Korea, Woo was sentenced to life imprisonment. South Korea claimed that he had been leading a group of spies. Throughout his imprisonment he refused to sign an oath of obedience to South Korea's National Security Law, which bans the display or expression of any pro-North Korean sentiment.

=== Torture allegation ===
A report by Amnesty International records his claim of torture in an underground facility after his arrest and a forced confession.

=== Solitary confinement ===
South Korean law specifies solitary confinement for spies, even if they pose no physical threat. Woo was held in solitary confinement in a 12-by-12-foot cell since his capture aboard a North Korean boat. The terms of his imprisonment permitted 30 minutes of daily exercise with other prisoners. In 1998, he was said to be "missing all his teeth because of years of torture, poor food, and inadequate medical treatment". In 1999, prior to his release, he was reported to be suffering from a degree of muscular paralysis resulting from a stroke.

== Release and repatriation ==
Woo was among 17 long-term detainees released under a wider amnesty to mark President Kim Dae-jung's first year in office. As a 70-year-old man, he walked free from the gates of Daejeon prison. It was proposed that he be allowed to return to North Korea, where he had a wife and son, in exchange for South Korean prisoners of war. He returned to North Korea, though not in exchange for any imprisoned South Koreans, in early September 2000, and was immediately awarded the National Reunification Prize.

== See also ==
- Prisoner of conscience
