= Ri In-mo =

North Korean guerrilla (1917–2007)

- Born: 24 August 1917; Kimhyonggwon County, Japanese Korea
- Died: 16 June 2007 (aged 89); Pyongyang, North Korea
- Known for: Political prisoner of South Korea

- Ri In-mo
- Hangul: 리인모
- Hanja: 李仁模
- RR: Ri Inmo
- MR: Ri Inmo

Ri In-mo (Korean: 리인모; 24 August 1917 - 16 June 2007) was an unconverted long-term prisoner who spent 40 years in prison and under the restriction of freedom in South Korea.

== History ==
Described by the Korean Central News Agency as "well-known among the DPRK people as an incarnation of faith and will" and "a pro-reunification patriotic fighter," Ri was born in 1917 in Kimhyonggwon County during the Japanese occupation of Korea. He was arrested by South Korea while he was fighting as a guerilla in Jirisan in January 1952 while he served as a war correspondent of the Korean People's Army during the Korean War. Ri served 34 years in prison in South Korea. During his incarceration, Ri was offered his freedom in exchange for signing a form renouncing his political beliefs but repeatedly refused.

Ri was released in 1988, but South Korean authorities continued to restrict his activities. He was repatriated to North Korea in March 1993 and was reunited with his wife and daughter. Following his repatriation, Ri was in ill health, apparently due to the conditions he experienced in prison. He underwent medical treatment in the United States in 1996. After his health improved, his suffering in prison was put into film by North Korea. Ri's numerous public appearances made him popular in the North.

Ri died on 16 June 2007 and was given a hero's funeral. His funeral committee was chaired by Kim Yong-nam with Choe Thae-bok as its vice-chairman and had 55 members including Kim Yong-il. A statue was erected in his honour in Pyongyang the following year.

== Works ==
- Ri In-mo (1993). Incarnation of Faith and Will: Notes of Ri In Mo, Former War Correspondent of the Korean People's Army. Pyongyang: Foreign Languages Publishing House. OCLC 34912928.
- — (1994). A Withered Leaf Turning Green. Pyongyang: Foreign Languages Publishing House. OCLC 272460322.
- — (1997). My Life and Faith: Memoirs. Pyongyang: Foreign Languages Publishing House. OCLC 240638109.

== See also ==
- Unconverted long-term prisoners
