= Kim Dong-won (filmmaker, born 1955) =

South Korean filmmaker (born 1955)

- Born: February 24, 1955 (age 71); Seoul, South Korea
- Education: Sogang University
- Occupation: Documentary filmmaker
- Years active: 1988–present

Korean name
- Hangul: 김동원
- RR: Gim Dongwon
- MR: Kim Tongwŏn

Kim Dong-won (Korean: 김동원; born February 24, 1955) is a South Korean documentary filmmaker. Kim is best known for his documentary films Repatriation (2004) and 63 Years On (2008).

== Career ==
His acclaimed documentary Repatriation (2004) documents the lives of North Korean spies who were captured in South Korea and takes a look at their journey back to their homeland after being detained in the South's prisons for over 30 years. A labour of love that took him more than a decade to finish, it has been hailed as the most successful documentary ever in South Korea. It also won Special Mention at the 24th Korean Association of Film Critics Awards and Special Jury Prize at the 5th Busan Film Critics Awards in 2004, as well as Best Documentary Award at the 19th Fribourg International Film Festival in 2005.

His latest documentary 63 Years On won Best Documentary Feature Film at the 2nd Asia Pacific Screen Awards in 2008.

== Filmography ==
=== As director ===
- Seoul Jesus (1986) (in directing department)
- James' May (short film, 1986)
- Sanggye-dong Olympic (documentary short, 1988) (also credited as cinematographer)
- Standing on the Edge of Death (short film, 1990)
- God Saw That It Was Good (short film, 1991)
- Haengdang-dong People (short film, 1994)
- Becoming One Is To Become Larger, We'll Be One (short film, 1995)
- People In a Flood of Media (short film, 1995)
- The Six Day Fight in Myong Dong Cathedral (short film, 1997)
- Another World We are Making: Haengdang-dong People 2 (short film, 1999)
- A Man (short film, 2001)
- Takken Family (short film, 2001)
- Repatriation (documentary, 2004)
- If You Were Me 2 (segment: "Jongno, Winter") (2006)
- 63 Years On (documentary, 2008)
- The 2nd Repatriation (2022)

=== As screenwriter ===
- Repatriation (documentary, 2004)
- If You Were Me 2 (segment: "Jongno, Winter") (2006)

=== As producer ===
- People In a Flood of Media (short film, 1995)
- A Purple Handkerchief (short film, 1995)

=== As script editor ===
- If You Were Me 2 (segment: "Jongno, Winter") (2006)
- 63 Years On (documentary, 2008)

== Awards ==
- 2004 5th Busan Film Critics Awards: Special Jury Prize (Repatriation)
- 2004 24th Korean Association of Film Critics Awards: Special Mention (Repatriation)
- 2014 23rd Buil Film Awards: Yu Hyun-mok Film Arts Award
