= No Burqas Behind Bars =

- Promotional poster
- Directed by: Maryam Ebrahimi; Nima Sarvestani
- Written by: Steven Seidenberg
- Production companies: DR Fjernsynsteatret; Interkerkelijke Omroep Nederland; NHK; Nima Film; Norsk Rikskringkasting; Sveriges Television
- Distributed by: Deckert Distribution; NHK BS1
- Release date: 2012
- Running time: 77 minutes
- Countries: Sweden; Afghanistan
- Languages: Dari; Persian

No Burqas Behind Bars is a 2012 Swedish feature-length documentary film made by Maryam Ebrahimi and Nima Sarvestani on life in a women's prison in Afghanistan.

In Takhar Prison, Afghanistan, 40 women are locked behind bars together with their 34 children. They all share four cells. Through the prisoners’ own stories, the film explores how "moral crimes" are used to control women in Afghanistan. The film shows that women fleeing from their husbands get a longer punishment than those who have committed murder. Outside the home, burqas cover the women of Afghanistan from head to toe, masking their identity, making them faceless and voiceless in society, except when they are in prison. Sima was forced to get married at the age of ten and had five children by the time she was 20 years old. She is locked away, together with her children, for 15 years. Her crime consists of fleeing from an abusive husband, who had already murdered one of his other wives and their child. Sara, one of the main characters of the film, is locked away because she fell in love. Najibeh, Latife, and many more names – they all carry stories that show the inner strength and dignity of the human being when she faces obscene living conditions.

The film premiered at the 2012 International Documentary Film Festival Amsterdam.

== See also ==
- Love Crimes of Kabul, a 2011 documentary about inmates at the Badam Bagh women's prison in Kabul
