= Surabhi Sharma =

Indian filmmaker

- Born: Mumbai, Maharashtra, India
- Education: Film and Television Institute of India, Pune
- Occupations: Filmmaker, Educator, Curator
- Years active: 1998–present
- Website: Official website

Surabhi Sharma is an Indian filmmaker, educator and curator, based in Mumbai, India. She has worked on several feature-length documentaries apart from some short fiction films and video installations. Her key concern has been documenting cities in transition through the lens of labour, music and migration, and most recently reproductive labour. Cinema verite and ethnography are the genres that inform her filmmaking.,

== Educational background ==
Surabhi Sharma studied film direction at the Film and Television Institute of India, Pune. She holds a post-graduate diploma in Social Communication Media from Sophia College for Women and a BA in Anthropology and Psychology from St. Xavier's College, Mumbai

== Curating and teaching ==
Surabhi Sharma curated for FD Zone, a weekly programme of independent films and films from the archives of the state run Films Division of India. The programme was a result of curation by a small group of Mumbai-based Independent filmmakers. FD Zone ran successfully from 2012 until 2015. She co-curated a film festival titled, Shehernama: a city/film festival, in 2014. The festival traveled to a few cities and universities after premiering in Mumbai. She was the guest festival director of ViBGYOR Film Festival, 2014. Surabhi Sharma conducts intensive 2-3 weeklong documentary filmmaking workshops at the National Institute of Design Ahmedabad, K. R. Narayanan National Institute of Visual Science and Arts, Kottayam, Kerala. and Whistling Woods International Institute, Mumbai. She has been a guest lecturer at the School of Media and Cultural Studies Tata Institute of Social Sciences, Mumbai, Social Communications Media, Sophia College for Women, Mumbai, Film and Television Institute of India, Pune and at the Symbiosis International University, Pune.

== Fiction and television ==
Scripted fiction tele-films for the programme titled ‘Rishtey (TV series)’ and 'Gubbare' on Star TV in the late 1990s. Did research and scripting for various non-fiction programmes for television. 'Bhoomi' was a proposed series on the environment and 'Teen Talk' was telecast over a year. Wrote Hindi dialogues for a television serial, 'Sehar'. The programme was telecast on Star TV in 2000–2001. Direction and scripting of more than 10 episodes of a fiction programme on concepts of science for children meant for telecast, produced by the Karnataka State Government.

== Filmography ==
| Year | Title |
|---|---|
| 2017 | Phir Se Samm Pe Aana/ Returning to the First Beat |
| 2013 | Bidesia in Bambai |
| 2012 | Can We See the Baby Bump Please? |
| 2011 | Tracing Bylanes |
| 2009 | Labels from a Global City |
| 2008 | Pregnancy, Prescriptions and Protocol |
| 2007 | Jahaji Music: India in the Caribbean |
| 2004 | Above the Din of Sewing Machines |
| 2003 | Aamakaar (The Turtle people), |
| 2001 | Jari Mari: Of Cloth and Other Stories |

== Video Art ==
| Year | Title |
|---|---|
| 2016 | Riyaaz |
| 2015 | Making Music, Making Space |
| 2011 | The Enactment of Exile in Mumbai |

== Awards ==
- The MPA-APSA fund for film development of 'Music in a Village Named 1 PB' (2015).
- Bidesia in Bambai, nominated as the five best documentaries at the Asia Pacific Screen Awards 2014
- Special mention by the Jury at the Jeevika Film Festival 2013 for 'Can We See The Baby Bump Please?’
- The Puma Catalyst Award in 2011 by the Britdoc Foundation. It is awarded for the development of the project titled 'Bidesia in Bambai'.
- The Turtle People (2003) was awarded the first Ramsar- Medwet Award at Eco-Cinema, Greece.
- Majlis Fellowship of in 2002 for the project title From the Post Man to the Courier Boy'.
- Jari mari: of cloth and other stories' won awards at Film South Asia, Nepal; Karachi Film Festival, Pakistan; and The Festival of Three Continents, Argentina
