= Guy Davidi =

Israeli documentary filmmaker

- גיא דוידי
- Born: July 9, 1978 (age 48); Jaffa
- Occupation: filmmaker

Guy Davidi (Hebrew: גיא דוידי; born July 9, 1978) is an Israeli documentary filmmaker. The movie he co-directed with Emad Burnat, 5 Broken Cameras, was nominated for the 2013 Academy Award for Best Documentary Feature. Davidi also won the Best Directing Award along with Palestinian co-director Emad Burnat in the 2012 Sundance Film Festival and the 2013 international Emmy Award as well as numerous awards worldwide.

Davidi was born in Jaffa and grew up in Holon and Kfar Saba in Israel.

== Cinematography ==
- Innocence (2022)
- Mixed Feelings (2016)
- High Hopes (2014)
- 5 Broken Cameras (2011)
- Women Defying Barriers (2009)
- A Gift From Heaven (2008)

== Early career ==
On 2005, after several years of working as a camera man, Davidi began directing documentaries that focused on everyday life in the Israeli–Palestinian conflict. In 2006, Davidi directed the documentary In Working Progress, which dealt with the issue of Palestinian construction workers who worked in Israeli settlements. The film was shown at a number of film festivals including screenings in France, New Zealand, and Italy.

In 2008, Davidi directed the film A Gift from Heaven, which documented the lives of foreign workers in Israeli farms that fell under rocket fire from Gaza. The film was shown at the Curtocircuito International Short Film Festival (Spain) and at the Worker’s Film Festival in Haifa, Israel. In 2009, the film Women Defying Barriers was released, which documented the joint meetings of Israeli and Palestinian women in the midst of attacks on Gaza during Operation Defensive Shield. It won the award for Best Documentary at the 2010 61 Montecatini Film festival (Italy). In 2010, Davidi directed "Keywords," a short documentary produced by Israeli Social TV. The film describes the creation of the play Keywords, as based on the articles of Israeli journalist, Gideon Levy. The film was screened at the 2010 International Film Festival in Haifa, as well as the Sole Luna Festival in Italy.

That same year, Davidi also released his first full-length film, Interrupted Streams, which was jointly directed and produced by Davidi and Alexandre Goetschmann. The film deals with access to drinking water in the Palestinian village of Bil'in and shows the influence of the water shortage on the villagers' lives. It won the David Silver Award at the 2011 Jewish Film Festival in Warsaw, and was also nominated for Best Documentary at the Jerusalem Film Festival and at the Cinema South Festival in Israel.

== 5 Broken Cameras ==
At the end of 2011, Emad Burnat and Davidi released their feature-length film, 5 Broken Cameras, a joint Israeli-Palestinian-French production in cooperation with Israel's Channel 8 as well as TV channels in France and the Netherlands. The film is based on six years of video footage taken by photographer Emad Burnat, a resident of Bil'in. The film chronicles the village’s struggle against the construction of the separation barrier as seen through the eyes of Burnat, as well as the effects of the village’s struggle on Burnat's family and personal life. The film was met with international acclaim, winning the World Cinema Directing Award at the Sundance Film Festival in 2012, the Special Broadcaster IDFA Audience Award and the Special Jury Award at the International Documentary Film Festival Amsterdam in 2011, the 2012 Audience Award at the Sheffield Doc/Fest, the 2013 international Emmy Award as well as more than ten other awards from around the world. The film was also sold to dozens of TV stations and was released in movie theaters across the world including the United States, Canada, England, France, and Japan. The film was screened at the 2012 Jerusalem Film Festival and the 2012 Israeli Cinema South Festival, where it won the Juliano Mer Prize. The film was nominated in the category of Best Documentary at the Academy Awards, where it ran against another Israeli production, The Gatekeepers. Davidi sparked controversy when he stated in an interview with Israeli TV that "he does not represent Israel, only himself" at the Oscars.

== Current projects ==
In addition to his work as a filmmaker, Davidi also teaches cinema and video skills for the project, Video Act. The project works with artists to help them independently produce films that promote critical thinking and social change.
