= Maryam Ebrahimi =

- Born: Maryam Ebrahimi; May 28, 1976 (age 49); Tehran, Iran
- Occupation(s): Director, Producer, Writer, Journalist
- Years active: 1985–Present
- Spouse: Nima Sarvestani (m. 2000; div. 2020);1 children
- Children: 1

Maryam Ebrahimi (born May 28, 1976) is a Swedish Iranian journalist, documentary filmmaker, producer and director.

== Biography ==
Ebrahimi was born in Tehran, Iran on May 28, 1976. She is a journalist and TV producer based in Sweden. She has made several reports around the world, especially in Middle East. Maryam is well known for her documentaries broadcast on international TV channels.

Her documentary No Burqas Behind Bars shot in Afghanistan won an international Emmy Award in 2014. In 2018 she received the gold prize during the Festival International de Programmes Audiovisuels in Biarritz for her documentary Stronger than a Bullet.

== Filmography ==
- Stronger than a Bullet (2017)
- Prison Sisters (2016)
- The Death Row (2013)
- No Burqas Behind Bars (2012)
- I Was Worth 50 Sheep (2011)
