= Nima Sarvestani =

Swedish-Iranian filmmaker (born 1958)

- Born: December 22, 1958 (age 67); Shiraz, Iran
- Occupations: Director, Producer, Writer
- Years active: 1985–Present
- Spouse: Maryam Ebrahimi (m. 2000; div. 2020);1 children
- Children: 2

Nima Sarvestani (Persian: نیما سروستانی) (born December 22, 1958, in Shiraz, Iran) is a Swedish-Iranian filmmaker.

== Biography ==
Nima Sarvestani (born December 22, 1958) is a Swedish Iranian documentary filmmaker. Born in Shiraz, Iran, Sarvestani worked as a journalist in Iran for several years reporting on social and political issues. In 1984 Sarvestani left his homeland and immigrated to Sweden. Despite changing his perspective forever, he has remained faithful to the subjects that interested him as a journalist in Iran. In 1988, he founded his own production company in Stockholm called Nima Film Productions, which allows him to oversee the entire process when making his own films. Having over 34 years of experience in directing and producing documentary films for cinema and television, he is one of the most experienced documentary film makers in Sweden today. Sarvestani is well-known for making tough topics such as human rights and social justice interesting for the ordinary viewer. His films are character-driven, resulting in a natural flow and enhancing the sense of drama. He has made several films in Sweden, Afghanistan, Bangladesh and Iran about women’s rights.

== Filmography ==
- Stronger Than A Bullet (2017)
- Prison Sisters (2016)
- Sussie And The Dollhouse (2015)
- The Death Row (2015)
- Those Who Said No (2014)
- No Burqas Behind Bars (2012)
- I Was Worth 50 Sheep (2011)
- On The Border Of Desperation (2008)
- Iranian Kidney Bargain Sale (2006)
- Naked And Wind (2004)
- Dead Mans Guest (2001)
- Masoud (1998)
- The Viscous Circle (1995)
- The Sharp Pencil (1995)
- Den onda smärtan (1994)
- Shame (1993)
- Zilemo (1993)
- Leverage (1992)
- Enkel biljett (1988)
- Bakgrund (1987)

== Awards ==
Click here to see full list of awards.

=== Prison Sisters (2016) ===
- IDFA 2016 International Documentary Film festival Amsterdam Amsterdam
- WATCH DOCS, Poland
- Gothenburg Film Festival, Sweden
- Thessaloniki Documentary Festival, Greece
- Human Rights Human Wrong, Norway
- Belfast Film Festival, Northern Ireland

=== Those Who Said No (2014) ===
- winners/ best film 2016 Golden Nymph Awards / Monte-Carlo
- Winners Sole Luna Doc Film Festival 2015 / Italy /Juli 2015

=== No Burqas Behind Bars (2013) ===
- The International Emmy Awards 2014 ,
- Best International Documentary
- Prix Europe 2014, AWARDED with the Prix Europa for Best Documentary
- Swedish TV Awards "Kristallen" (August 2014, Nominated Best TV Documentary)
- Brooklyn Film Festival 2014, Awarded Best Feature Documentary
- Rome Independent Film Festival (March 2014, Awarded Best International Documentary)
