= Bil'in =

Palestinian village in Ramallah and al-Bireh, State of Palestine

- Municipality type D (Village council)

Arabic transcription(s)
  - Arabic: بلعين
  - Latin: Bilin (unofficial)
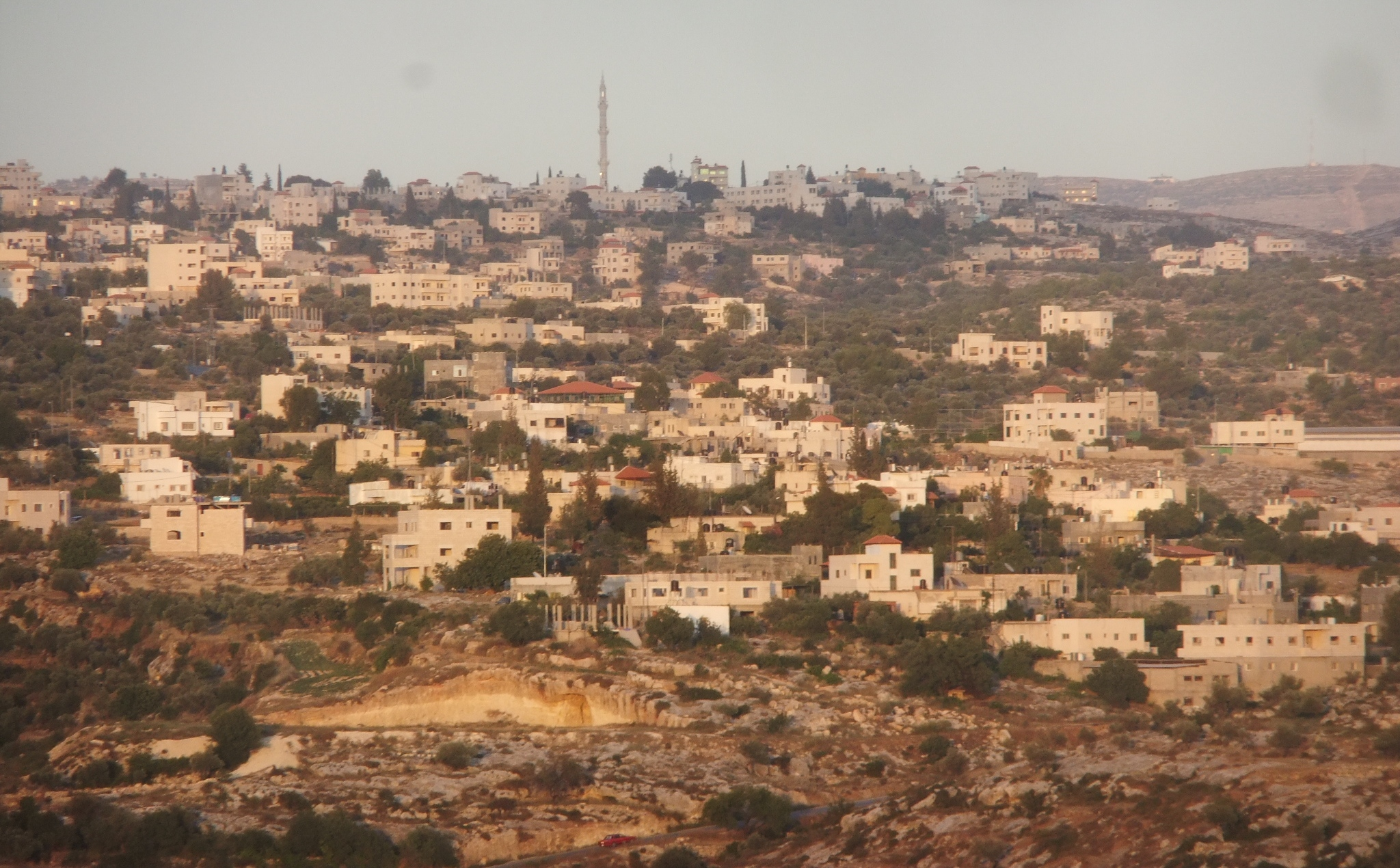
- View of Bil'in

- Location of Bil'in within Palestine
- Coordinates: 31°55′40″N 35°04′16″E
- Palestine grid: 156/148
- State: State of Palestine
- Governorate: Ramallah and al-Bireh

Government
  - Type: Village council
  - Head of Municipality: Ahmed Issa Abdullah Yassin

Area
  - Total: 4.0 km^{2} (1.5 sq mi)

Population (2017)
  - Total: 2,137
  - Density: 530/km^{2} (1,400/sq mi)
- Name meaning: Belain (personal name)

Bil'in (Arabic: بلعين) is a Palestinian village located in the Ramallah and al-Bireh Governorate, 12 kilometres (7.5 mi) west of the city of Ramallah in the central West Bank. According to the Palestinian Central Bureau of Statistics, Bil'in had a population of 2,137 in 2017. In the 2000s, it was known for its regular protests against Israeli occupation.

== Etymology ==
Bilʽīn derives from Canaanite/Hebrew ba'lin (ba'als), with switching of consonants.

Conder proposed identifying Bil'in with the biblical Ba'alath, whereas Avi-Yonah suggested it could be Ba'alah, a place mentioned in the Talmud. However, Finkelstein and Lederman dismissed both possibilities based on their findings.

== History ==
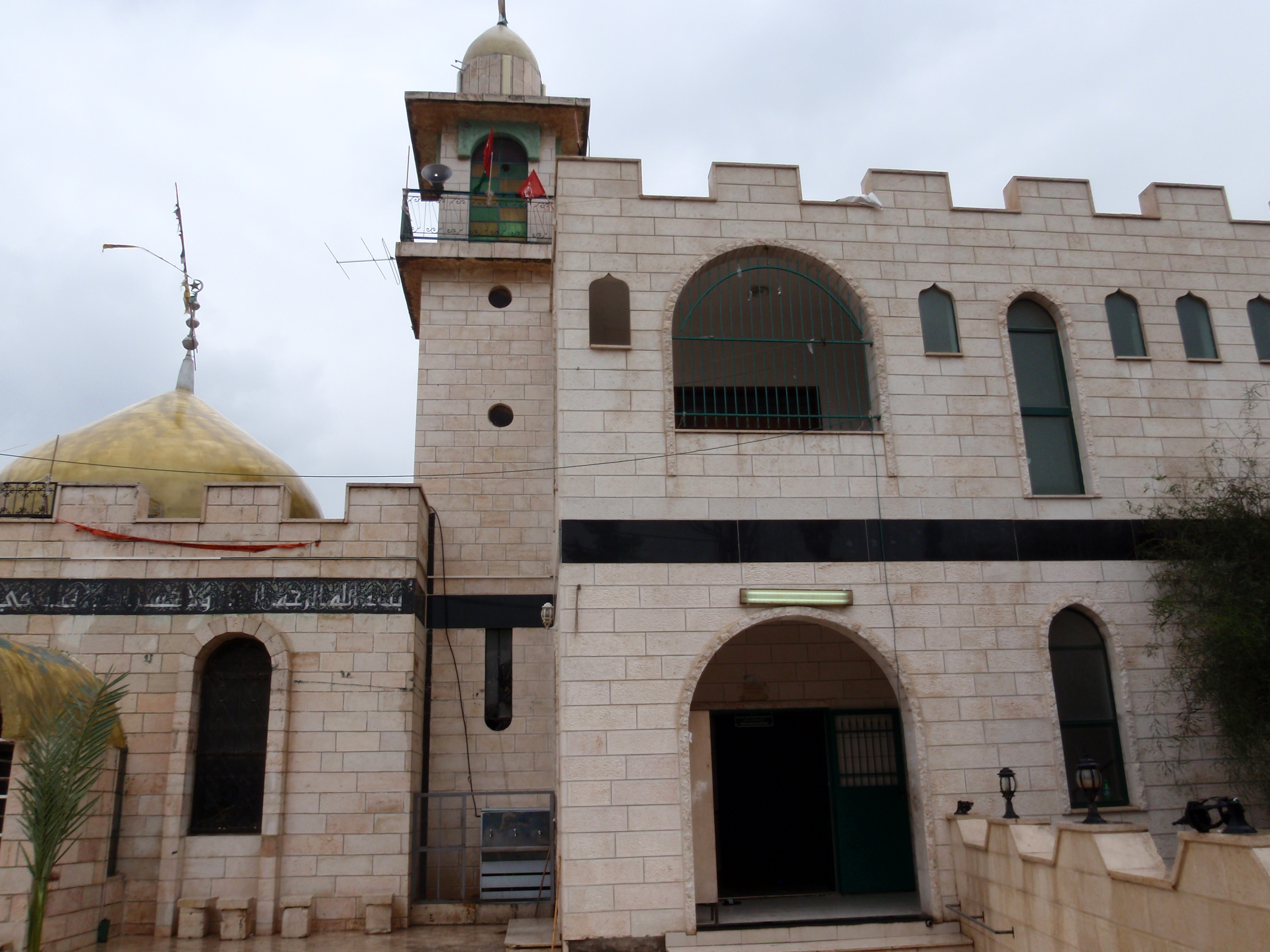
Main mosque of Bil'in

Potsherds from the Hellenistic, Byzantine, Crusader/Ayyubid, and Mamluk periods have been found here. Conder proposed identifying Bil'in with the biblical Ba'alath, whereas Avi-Yonah suggested it could be Ba'alah, a place mentioned in the Talmud. However, Finkelstein and Lederman dismissed both possibilities based on their findings.

=== Ottoman era ===
Potsherds from the early Ottoman period have been found.

In 1863, the French explorer Victor Guérin saw it from a distance, and described it a small hamlet, while an official Ottoman village list of about 1870 showed 32 houses and a population of 147, though the population count included men, only. In 1882 the PEF's Survey of Western Palestine described Bil'in (then called Belain) as "a little village on a hill-side".

=== British Mandate era ===
In the 1922 census of Palestine conducted by the British Mandate authorities, Bil'in had a population of 133, all Muslim, increasing in the 1931 census to 166, still all Muslims, in a total of 39 houses.

In the 1945 statistics, the village had 210 Muslim inhabitants, while the total land area was 3,992 dunams, according to an official land and population survey. Of this, 1,450 dunums of village land was plantations and irrigable land, 800 were used for cereals, while 6 dunams were classified as built-up public areas.

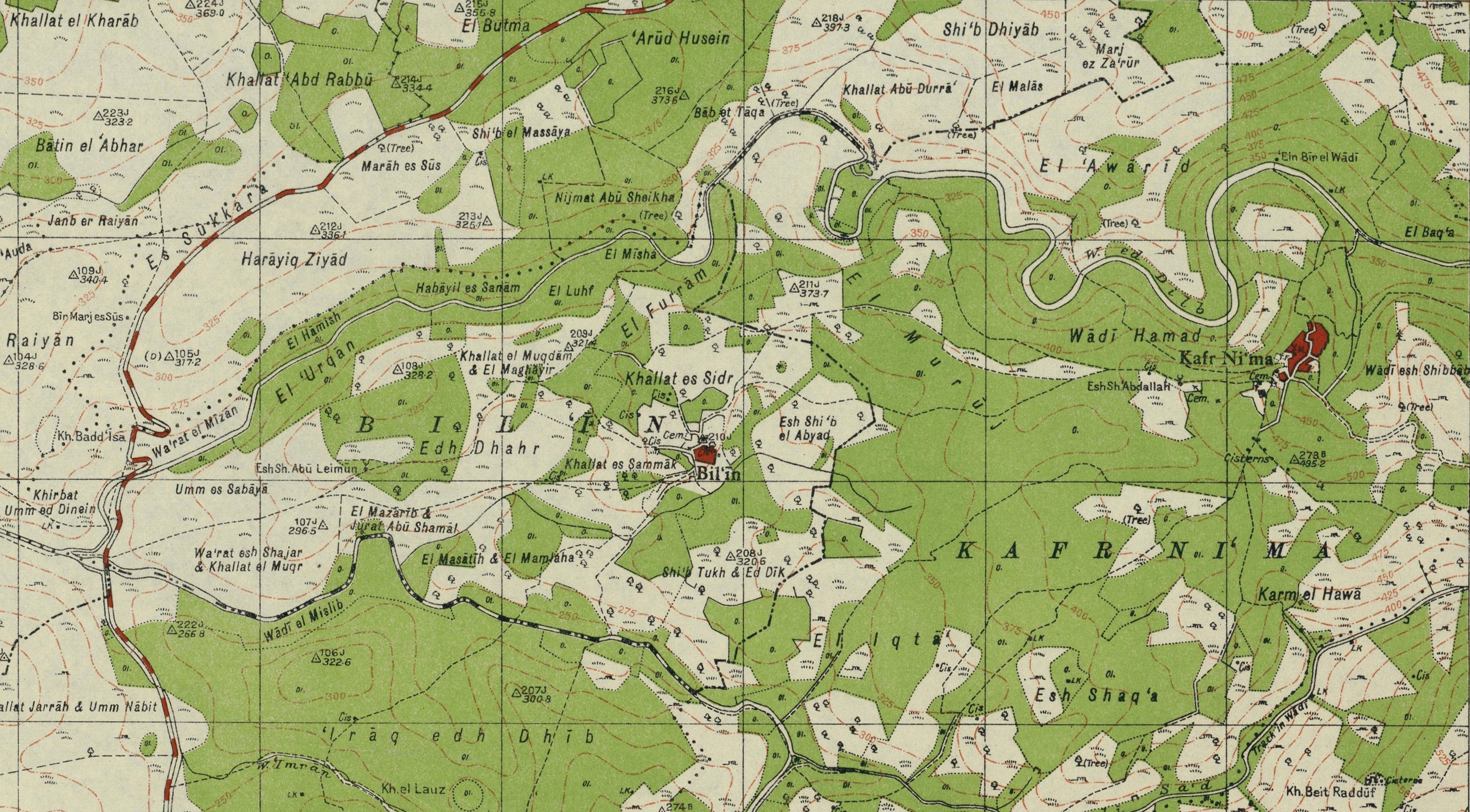
Bil'in 1944 1:20,000 from 1919 survey

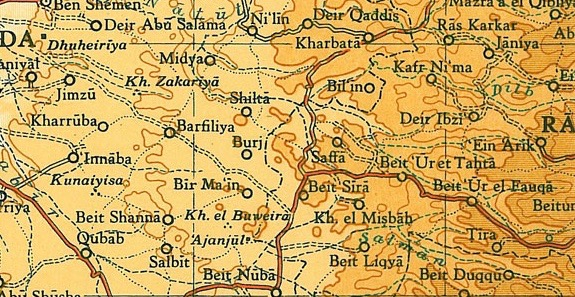
Bil'in 1945 1:250,000 (top right quadrant)

=== Jordanian era ===
In the wake of the 1948 Arab–Israeli War, and after the 1949 Armistice Agreements, Bil'in came under Jordanian rule.

The Jordanian census of 1961 found 365 inhabitants.

=== Post-1967 ===
After the Six-Day War in 1967, Bil'in has been under Israeli occupation.

Since the signing of the Interim Agreement on the West Bank and the Gaza Strip in 1995, it has been administered by the Palestinian National Authority. It is adjacent to the Israeli West Bank barrier and the Israeli settlement of Modi'in Illit. Historically a small agricultural village, modern Bil'in is now nine kilometres (five point six miles) from the western outskirts of Ramallah.

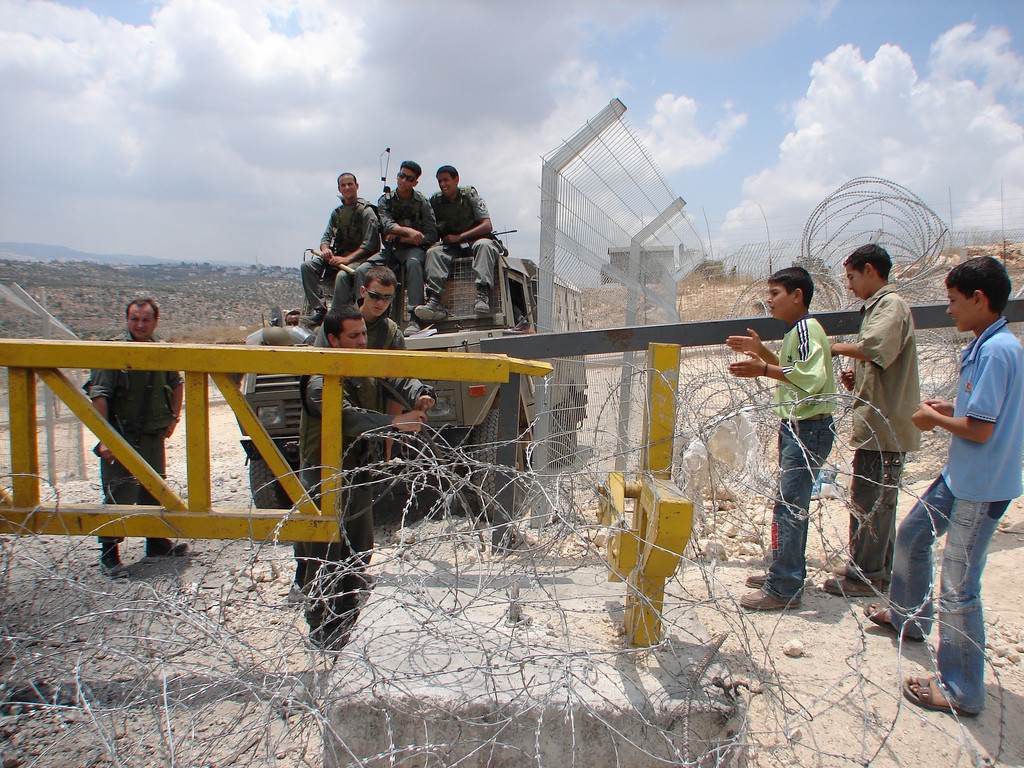
Demonstration by Palestinian children at a gate of the Israeli separation barrier in Bil'in, in the occupied West Bank, July 2006. The gate is the only means of entry for the villagers who have been separated from their farmland.

== Court rulings ==
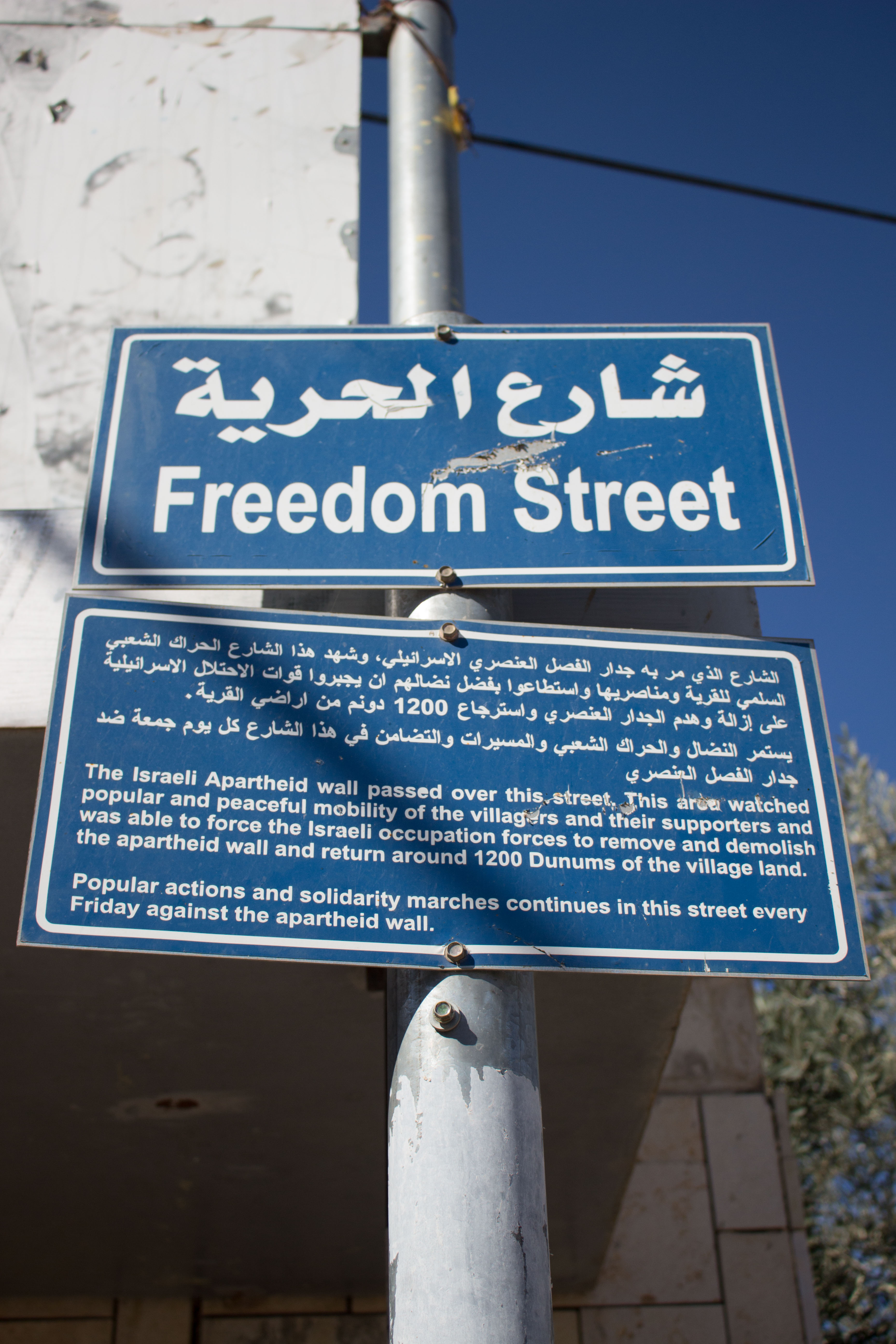
Freedom Street, in Bil'in village

Bil'in is located 4 kilometres (2 miles) east of the Green Line. Israel's West Bank barrier split the village in two, separating it from 60 percent of its farmland. In 2004, the International Court of Justice issued an advisory opinion that "the construction of the wall by Israel in the Occupied Palestinian Territory is contrary to international law".

In 2005, the local council leader of Bil'in, Ahmed Issa Abdullah Yassin, hired Israeli human rights lawyer Michael Sfard to represent the village in a petition to the High Court of Justice. On 4 September 2007, the Court ordered the government to change the route of the wall near Bil'in. Chief Justice Dorit Beinish wrote in her ruling: "We were not convinced that it is necessary for security-military reasons to retain the current route that passes on Bilin's lands." The Israeli Defense Ministry said it would respect the ruling and in 2011 began dismantling a section of the barrier in order to relocate it along an alternative route.

In February 2007, the Supreme Planning Council (SPC) for the West Bank "legalized" what Haaretz described at the time as "the largest-ever illegal construction project in the West Bank", 42 buildings with a total of approximately 1,500 apartments in the Matityahu East neighborhood of the ultra-Orthodox Israel settlement Modi'in Illit by Canadian registered companies Green Park and Green Mount, with two other companies, Ein Ami and Hefziba. The buildings were already in various stages of construction when the SPC announced their decision. In response, Michael Sfard filed a petition on behalf of Israeli NGO Peace Now and Bil'in residents at the High Court of Justice (HCJ) requesting a halt to the construction. The HCJ had already ordered that the construction and occupation of the buildings be halted the previous year based on another petition by Peace Now and Bil'in residents.

Sfard alleged that the planning authorities, who had refused to hear the claims of Bil'in residents intended to prove land ownership, were aware of the illegality of the construction but did not stop it and that the body administering the relocation of the barrier planned a route in order to obtain hundreds of dunams of Bil'in's agricultural lands for Modi'in Illit's expansion. On September 5, 2007, the day after the HCJ ordered the state to alter the route of a 1.7-kilometer section of the West Bank barrier, the court rejected the petition filed a year and a half earlier concerning Mattityahu East construction, and ruled that the existing buildings could remain, but ordered settlers, the state, and construction companies to pay the petitioners' NIS 160,000 court fees. The petition claimed that some of the land on which the settlement was being constructed was owned by Bil'in residents but the state claims that the land of Matityahu East belongs to the state. Describing the ruling, Haaretz reported that "the court based its decision on the fact that the petitions should have been filed several years earlier...the state will not remove the hundreds of settlers who stormed apartments they had purchased, after it became clear that construction company Heftsiba had collapsed...[and] the court apparently has given approval to the existing status quo in the area - the existing part of the neighborhood will remain in place, but plans to expand the neighborhood will not be carried out."

Mohammed Khatib, a member of Bil'in's Popular Committee Against the Wall and the secretary of Bil'in's Village Council, said they "will continue to challenge these expanding settlements because they threaten the futures of Bil'in and the Palestinian people".

According to the New Left Review, the settlements around Bil'in are being funded by Israeli businessmen Lev Leviev and Shaya Boymelgreen to promote their political and economic interests.

== Local protests ==
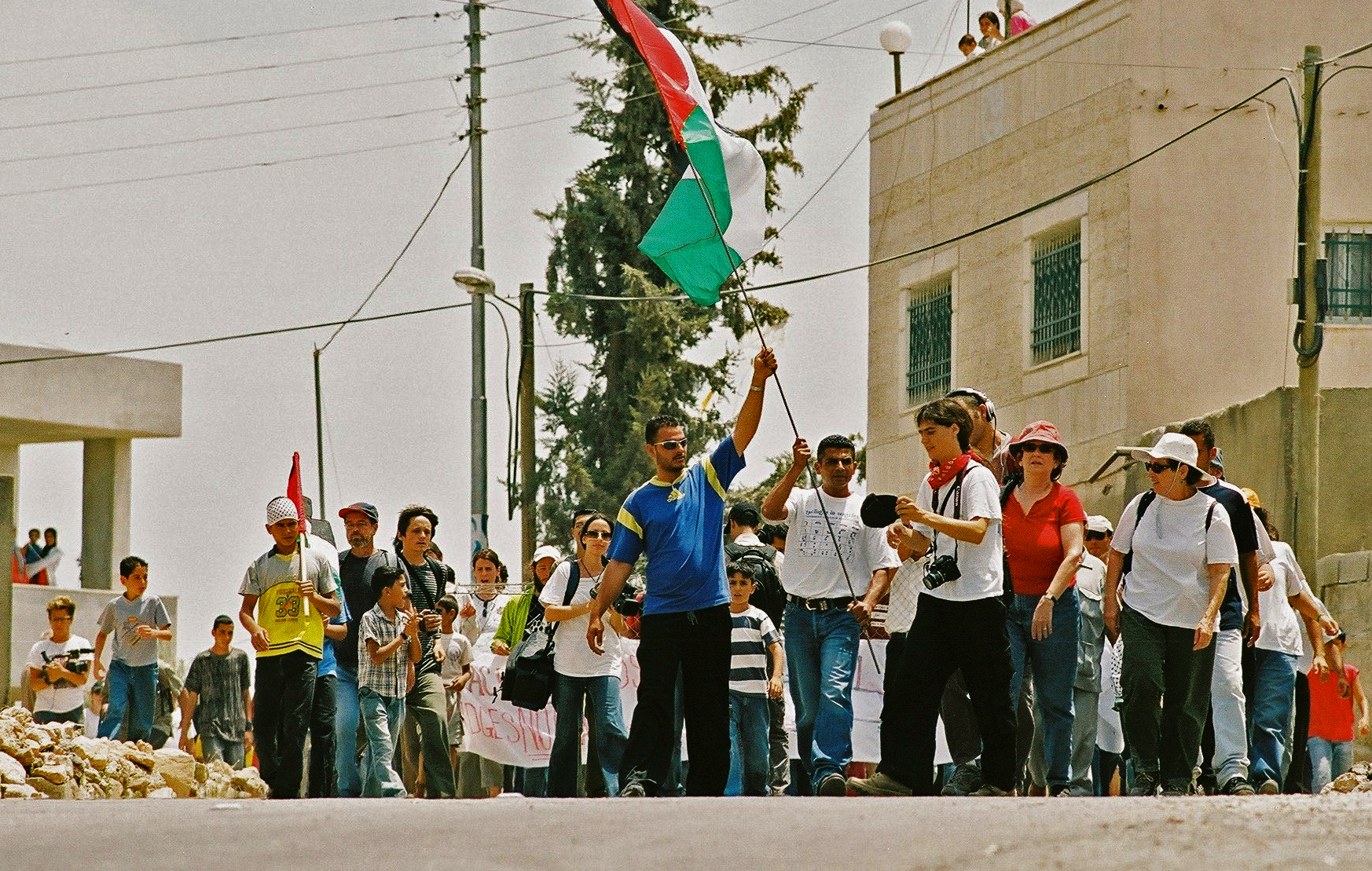
Palestinian Peaceful demonstration in Bil'in, July 2025

Since January 2005, the Bil'in Popular Committee against the Wall, led by Iyad Burnat, has been organizing weekly protests against the construction of the West Bank Barrier. The protests have attracted media attention and the participation of many international organizations as well as left-wing groups such as Gush Shalom, Anarchists Against the Wall and the International Solidarity Movement. The protests take the form of marches from the village to the site of the wall with the aim of halting construction and dismantling already constructed portions. Israeli forces always intervene to prevent protesters from approaching the wall, and violence usually erupts in which both protesters and soldiers have been very seriously injured. Some protesters took to wearing gas masks at the protests. The weekly protests, which last a couple of hours, regularly draw international activists who come to support the Palestinian movement. Undercover Israeli soldiers admitted in 2005 to throwing stones at other Israeli soldiers so they could blame it on Palestinians, as an excuse to crack down on peaceful protests by the Palestinians.

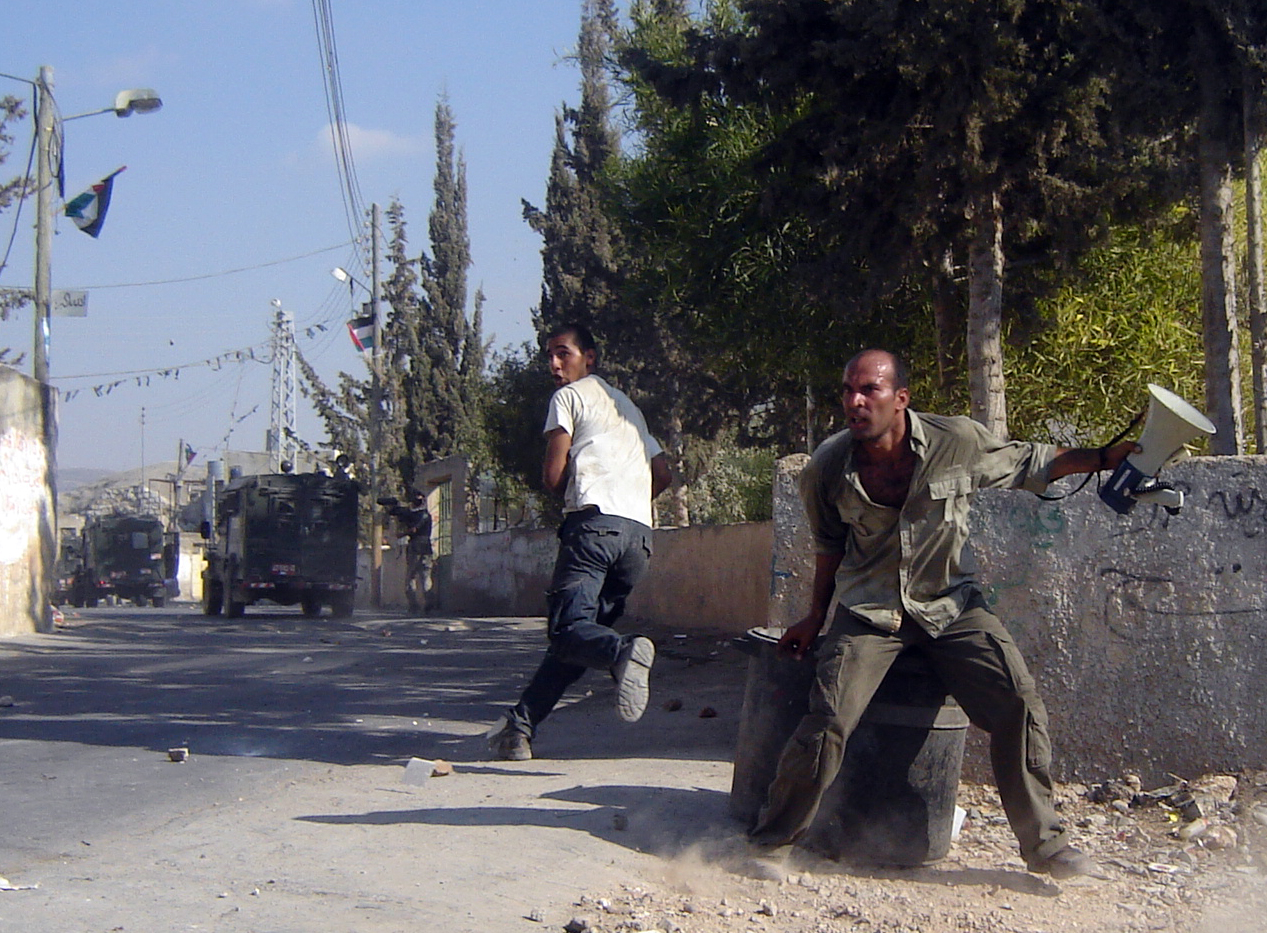
Israeli army Raid on the village of Bil'in, September 2005

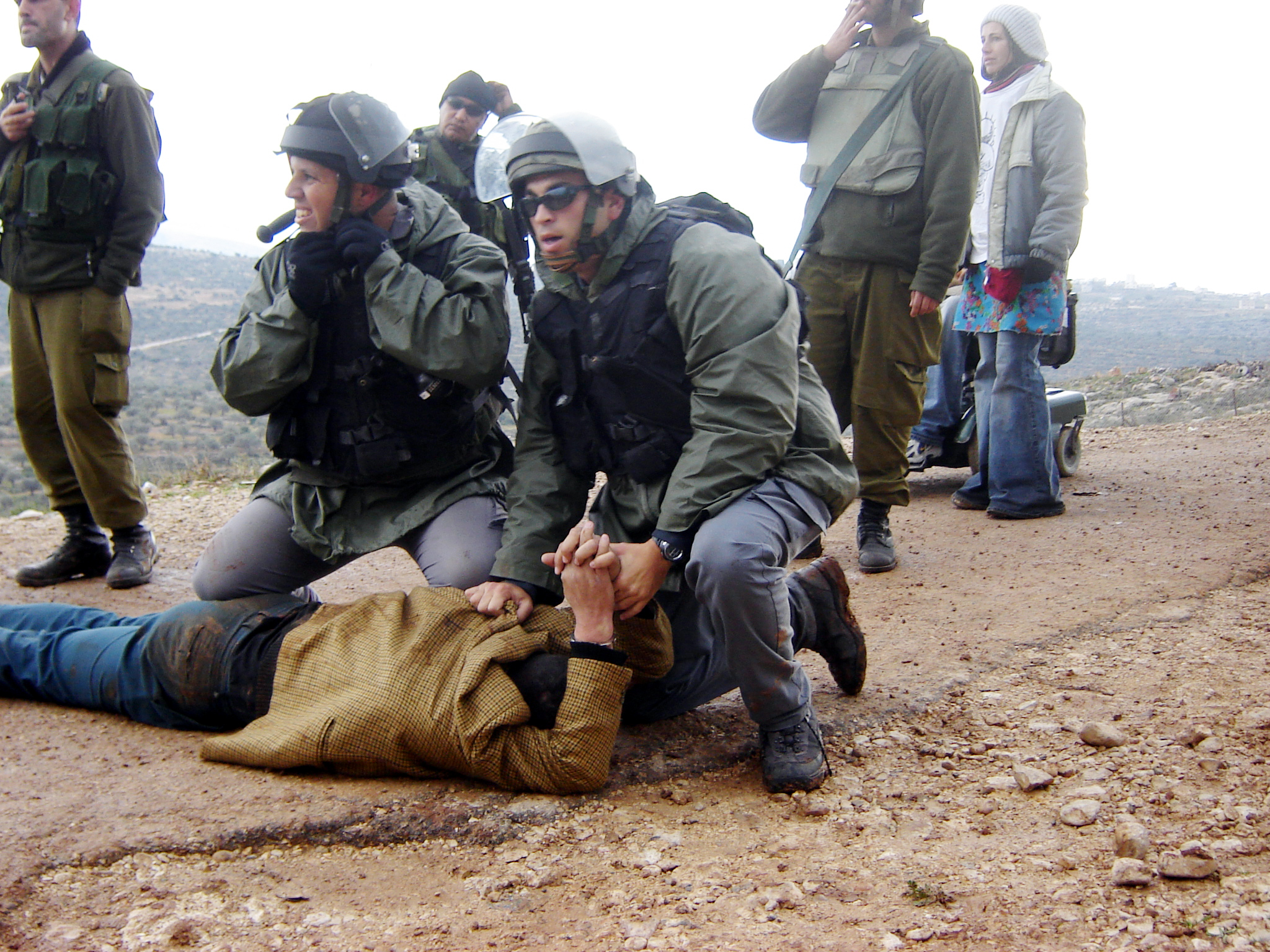
Arrest by the Israeli army of a Palestinian protesting against the separation wall in Bil'in, December 2005.

In June 2005 an Israeli soldier lost an eye after being hit by a rock thrown by a demonstrator. In the same incident rubber bullets were used resulting in seven protesters being wounded, one of whom was also hospitalised.

Two Bil’in protests in the summer of 2005 are described in detail by Irish journalist David Lynch in his book, A Divided Paradise: An Irishman in the Holy Land. In August 2006, a demonstration against the 2006 Lebanon War was dispersed by the Israel Border Police using tear gas and rubber coated bullets. An Israeli lawyer, Limor Goldstein, was severely injured after being shot twice.

Conferences demonstrating solidarity with the protesters were held in the village in February 2006 and April 2007.

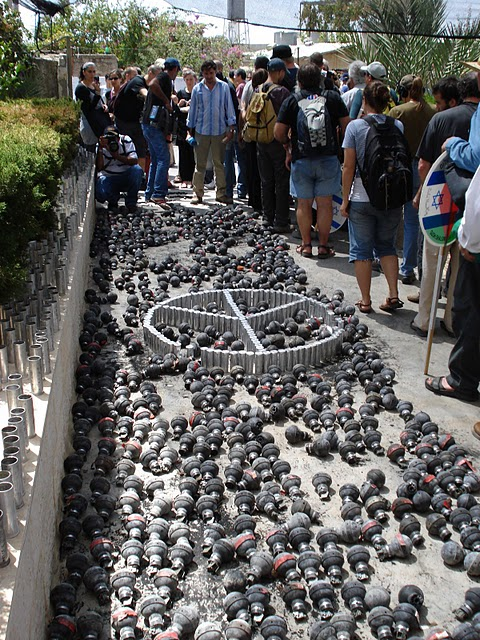
September 2007: Display of Israeli tear gas grenades used against Palestinians in the village of Bil'in, during several years of protest against the Israeli separation wall separating the village from about 40% of its land

Mairead Maguire, who won the Nobel Peace Prize in 1976 for her work on the Northern Ireland dispute, was hit in the leg by a rubber-coated bullet and reportedly inhaled large quantities of teargas during a demonstration in April 2007.

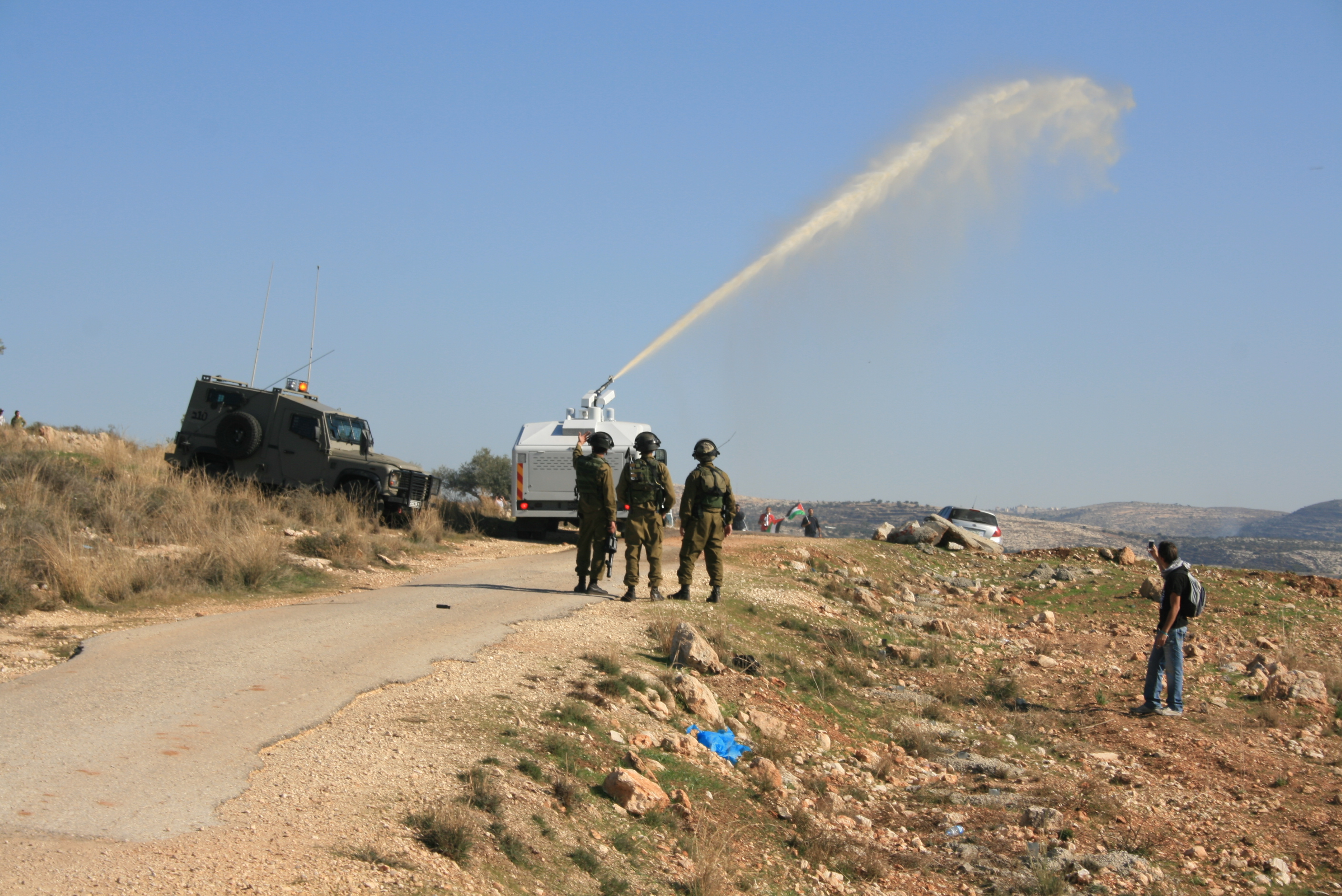
IDF spraying skunk water on Palestinian demonstrators in Bil'in, December 2011

In June 2008, European Parliament vice-president Luisa Morgantini and Julio Toscano, an Italian judge, were injured in Bil'in. In April 2009, Bil'in resident Bassem Ibrahim Abu-Rahma was killed after being hit in the chest by a high-velocity tear gas canister.

Abdullah Abu Rahma, coordinator of the Bil'in Popular Committee Against the Wall, was arrested in December 2009 after organizing an exhibit of spent ammunition used against the protesters. He was charged with possession of Israeli arms, incitement and hurling stones at IDF soldiers, and tried before an Israeli military court which found him guilty, according to Amnesty International on 'questionable evidence,' of "organizing and participating in an illegal demonstration" and "incitement". Testimony against him was based on allegations, subsequently retracted in court as having been made under duress, by three children that he had encouraged stone-throwing. Desmond Tutu urged Israel to release him. He was due for release on 18 November 2010, was kept in detention, and in January 2010 his year-long sentence was extended for another four months. He served a 15-month sentence in the Israeli prison of Ofer. He has been characterised by David Shulman as an exponent of Gandhian principles of non-violence. +972 magazine chose him as their person of the year in 2010.

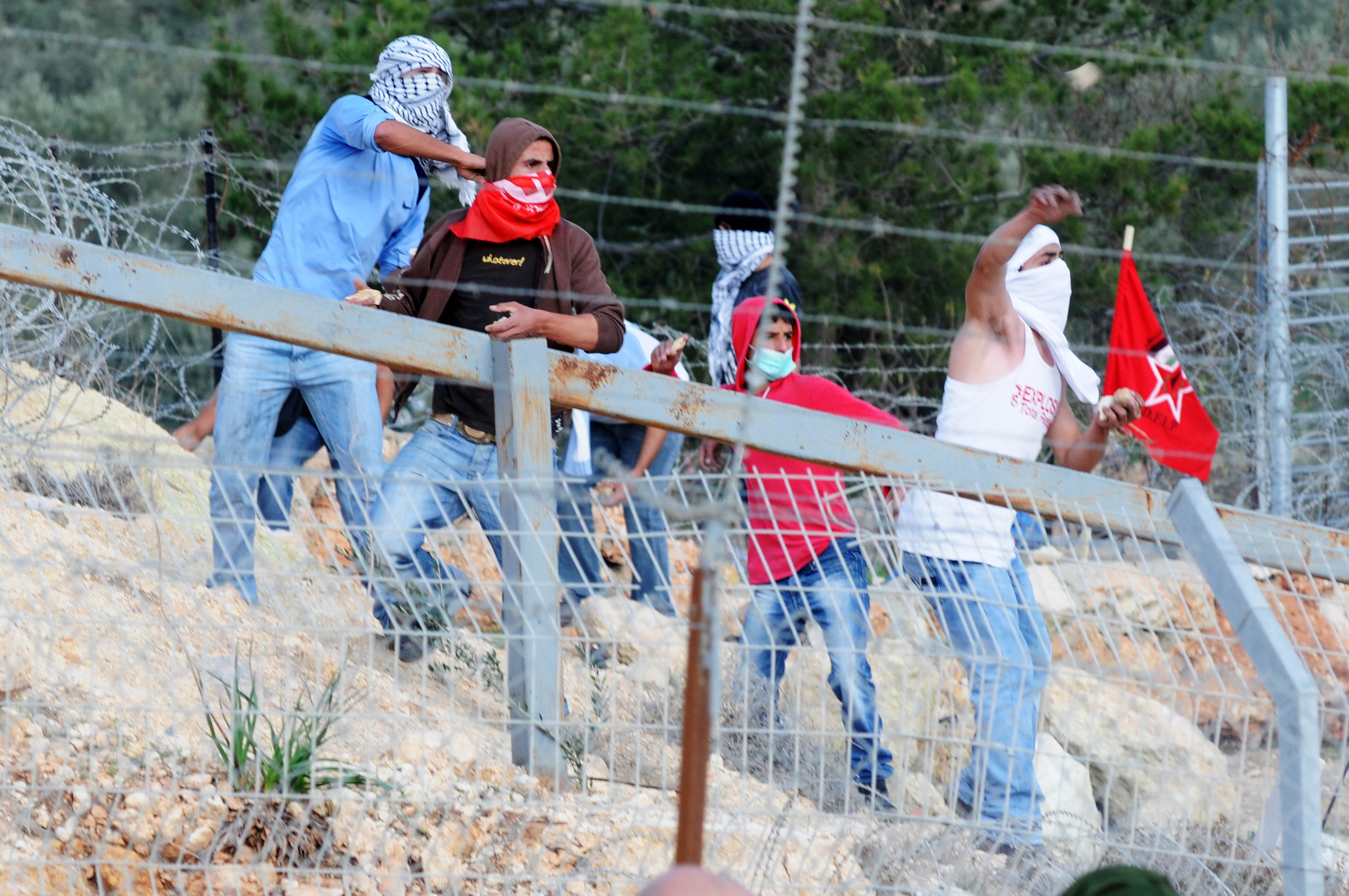
Protesters throwing stones at Bil'in, January 2011

On 15 March 2010, Israeli soldiers entered Bil'in to post notices declaring a closed military zone consisting of the areas between the barrier and the town. The order enforces the closure on Fridays between 0800 and 2000 during which the protests occur. While the closure does not apply to Palestinian residents of Bil'in, Israeli citizens and internationals are forbidden from entering the zone.

A film portraying the protests shot from the perspective of the people of Bil'in over many years starting in 2005 called 5 Broken Cameras, by Emad Burnat and Guy Davidi became popular after its release at the 2012 Sundance Film Festival, winning the Festival's World Cinema Documentary Directing Award. It was nominated for Best Documentary Feature in the 85th Academy Awards.

During Mohammed Barakeh's trial in 2012, undercover soldiers from the IDF testified that they had thrown stones against other IDF soldiers during Bil'in demonstrations.

=== Deaths ===
==== Bassem Abu Rahmeh ====
On 17 April 2009, Bassem Abu Rahmeh, 29, was killed after being struck in the chest by a teargas canister fired by Israeli forces during a protest in Bil'in.

His death is depicted in the 2011 film 5 Broken Cameras. The Israeli human rights group B'tselem has stated that three separate videos of the protest in which he was killed show he had neither been acting violently, nor endangering Israeli soldiers' lives, when he was killed. Israel's military prosecutor general closed the investigation in September 2013 stating that there was a lack of evidence. The decision to close the case was appealed by two attorneys, Emily Schaeffer Omer-Man and Michael Sfard, on behalf of the family, who accused the authorities of foot-dragging. On 1 April 2015, Justice Menny Mazuz ruled the State had to submit its response to the petition by 25 May.

An investigation by Forensic Architecture about the killing concluded that “the lethal strike was fired with the intention to kill or maim.” On 16.09.2018 they added: "The Israeli High Court ruled that while the Military Police and Judge Advocate General (an internal military investigator) did act negligently, including in losing their case file of the investigation. The implication is that no individuals should face charges, or be considered responsible for the death of Abu Rahma."

==== Jawaher Abu Rahma ====
On 31 December 2010, Jawaher Abu Rahma, age 36, died following a weekly protest. According to reports she was seriously injured in a tear gas attack during the demonstration. The exact cause of death is disputed. Other reports place her at home at the time of the incident, several hundred meters away. Taken to a hospital in Ramallah after she choked on the gas, she did not respond to treatment and died the following day. Members of the Israeli military (IDF) claimed there was no evidence Rahma participated in the protest, or that tear gas had killed her, and stated that there were irregularities in the Palestinian Authority's medical report on Rahma's death. The IDF soldiers referenced in the stories remain unnamed. Several Jewish Israelis in Tel Aviv who were protesting against the IDF's presumed involvement with the death were arrested by Israeli police on 1 January 2011 outside Israel's Defense Ministry. Jawaher was the sister of Bassem Abu Rahma, a prominent activist in Bil'in who was killed by the IDF in 2009.

According to a released medical report "there was no clear cause of death, the burial was undertaken via an accelerated procedure, and no post-mortem was performed. The information also reveals that Abu-Rahma was administered an unusual quantity of drugs, used to offer treatment against poisoning, drug overdose, or leukemia." However, an IDF spokesperson denied that Abu-Rahma died of medical negligence.

== Bibliography ==
- Barron, J.B., ed. (1923). Palestine: Report and General Abstracts of the Census of 1922. Government of Palestine.
- Conder, C.R.; Kitchener, H.H. (1882). The Survey of Western Palestine: Memoirs of the Topography, Orography, Hydrography, and Archaeology. Vol. 2. London: Committee of the Palestine Exploration Fund.
- Finkelstein, I.; Lederman, Zvi, eds. (1997). Highlands of many cultures. Tel Aviv: Institute of Archaeology of Tel Aviv University Publications Section. ISBN 965-440-007-3.
- Government of Jordan, Department of Statistics (1964). First Census of Population and Housing. Volume I: Final Tables; General Characteristics of the Population (PDF).
- Government of Palestine, Department of Statistics (1945). Village Statistics, April, 1945.
- Guérin, V. (1869). Description Géographique Historique et Archéologique de la Palestine (in French). Vol. 1: Judee, pt. 2. Paris: L'Imprimerie Nationale.
- Hadawi, S. (1970). Village Statistics of 1945: A Classification of Land and Area ownership in Palestine. Palestine Liberation Organization Research Center.
- Hartmann, M. (1883). "Die Ortschaftenliste des Liwa Jerusalem in dem türkischen Staatskalender für Syrien auf das Jahr 1288 der Flucht (1871)". Zeitschrift des Deutschen Palästina-Vereins. 6: 102–149.
- Mills, E., ed. (1932). Census of Palestine 1931. Population of Villages, Towns and Administrative Areas. Jerusalem: Government of Palestine.
- Palmer, E.H. (1881). The Survey of Western Palestine: Arabic and English Name Lists Collected During the Survey by Lieutenants Conder and Kitchener, R. E. Transliterated and Explained by E.H. Palmer. Committee of the Palestine Exploration Fund.
- Socin, A. (1879). "Alphabetisches Verzeichniss von Ortschaften des Paschalik Jerusalem". Zeitschrift des Deutschen Palästina-Vereins. 2: 135–163.
