= 2nd Asia Pacific Screen Awards =

The 2nd Asia Pacific Screen Awards were held in 2008.

== Winners and nominees ==
Winners are listed first and in bold.

=== Best Feature Film ===
- **Tulpan**
- Om Shanti Om
- Sparrow
- The Red Awn
- Three Monkeys

=== Best Youth Feature Film ===
- **The Black Balloon**
- King Siri
- Mahek
- Philippine Science

=== Best Animated Feature Film ===
- **Waltz With Bashir**
- If You Were Me: Anima Vision 2
- Sword of the Stranger

=== Best Documentary Feature Film ===
- **63 Years On**
- Kantata Takwa
- Tinar
- Rain of the Children
- 33 Days

=== Achievement in Cinematography ===
- **Lee Mogae** (**The Good, the Bad, the Weird**)
- Kiiran Deohans (Jodhaa Akbar)
- Gökhan Tiryaki (Three Monkeys)
- Oleg Kirichenko (Mermaid)
- Cheng Siu-Keung (Sparrow)

=== Achievement in Directing ===
- **Nuri Bilge Ceylan** (**Three Monkeys**)
- Sergey Dvortsevoy (Tulpan)
- Kim Jee-Woon (The Good, the Bad, the Weird)
- Kiyoshi Kurosawa (Tokyo Sonata)
- Johnnie To (Sparrow)

=== Best Screenplay ===
- **Eran Riklis** and **Suha Arraf** (**Lemon Tree**)
- Behnam Behzadi (Before the Burial)
- Hong Sangsoo (Night and Day)
- Max Mannix, Kiyoshi Kurosawa and Sachiko Tanaka (Tokyo Sonata)
- Dervish Zaim (Dot)

=== Best Performance by an Actress ===
- **Hiam Abbass** (**Lemon Tree**)
- Nesipkul Omarbekova (Native Dancer)
- Miao Pu (Cherries)
- Daria Moroz (Live and Remember)
- Akie Namiki (United Red Army)

=== Best Performance by an Actor ===
- **Reza Naji** (**The Song of Sparrows**)
- Rajat Kapoor (The Prisoner)
- Simon Yam (Sparrow)
- Kim Yoon-seok (The Chaser)
- Alireza Aghakhani (Before the Burial)

=== FIAPF Award ===
- **Yash Chopra**

=== UNESCO Award ===
- **Tinar**

=== Jury Grand Prize ===
- **The Prisoner**
- **The Red Awn**
