= Emad Burnat =

Palestinian farmer and filmmaker

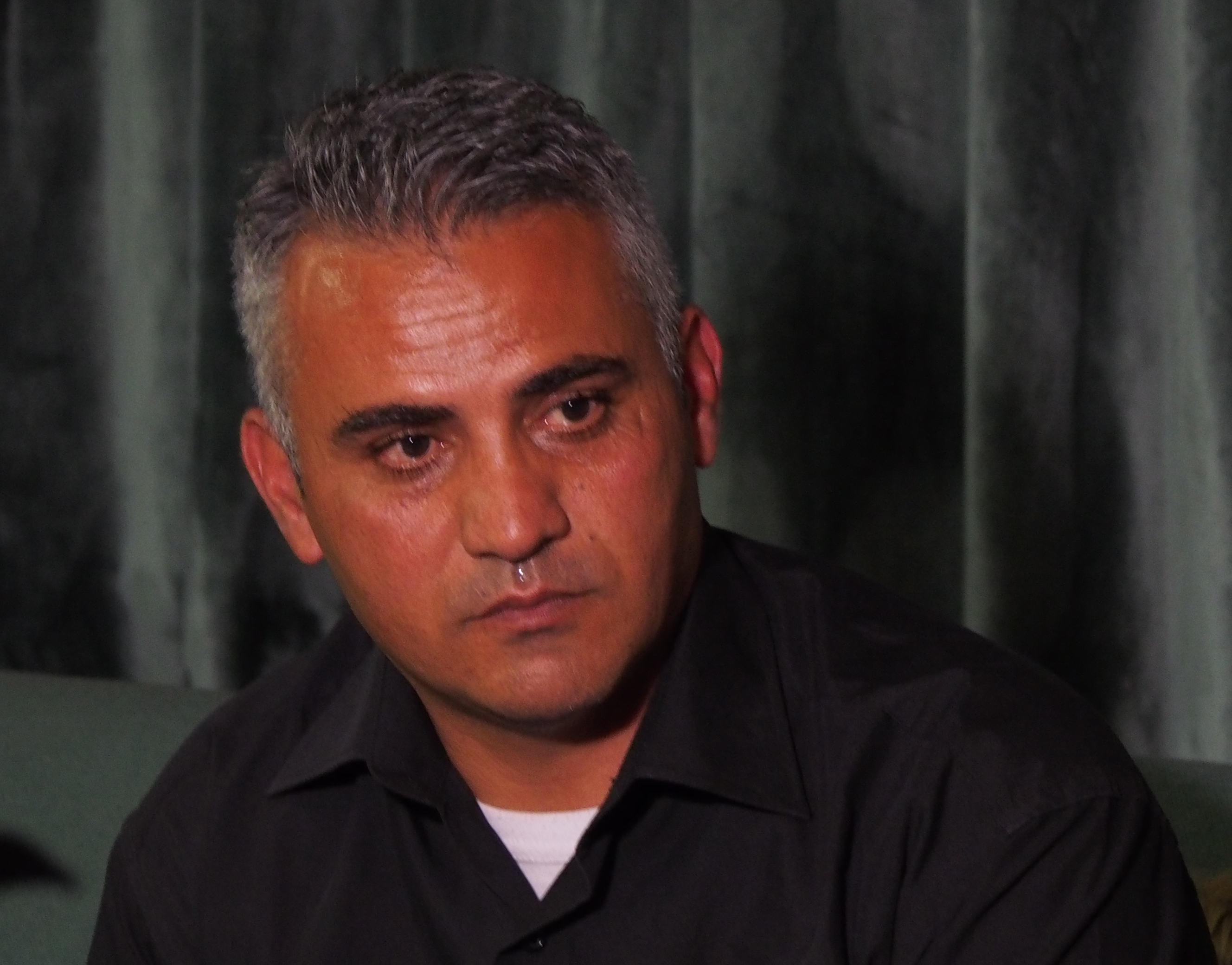
Emad Burnat in 2015

Emad Burnat is a Palestinian farmer and filmmaker, known for the documentary 5 Broken Cameras (2011). He is the first Palestinian nominated for the Academy Award for Best Documentary Feature.

== 5 Broken Cameras ==
His documentary 5 Broken Cameras is a first-hand account of life and demonstrations in Bil'in, a West Bank village adjacent to Israeli settlements. The film was co-directed by Burnat and Guy Davidi, an Israeli filmmaker. The film is structured in chapters around the destruction of each one of Burnat's cameras and the film follows one family's evolution over five years of village upheaval.

Five Broken Cameras is a Palestinian-Israeli-French co-production. Both the personal style of the movie and, especially, Burnat's working with an Israeli filmmaker, has been controversial amongst the Palestinian community due to the ongoing boycott against Israel by Palestinians. The boycott, however, was never intended to include a boycott of Israeli activists and the problem stems from Israel having claimed the film as their own following its Oscar nomination in 2012.

== Detention at Los Angeles International Airport ==
On February 19, 2013, he and his family were detained at Los Angeles International Airport, when customs officials refused to believe his reason for entry.

Although this was an unpleasant experience, this is a daily occurrence for Palestinians, every single day, throughout the West Bank. There are more than 500 Israeli checkpoints, roadblocks, and other barriers to movement across our land, and not a single one of us has been spared the experience that my family and I experienced yesterday.
