= ViBGYOR Film Festival =

Film festival in Thrissur, India

ViBGYOR International Film Festival
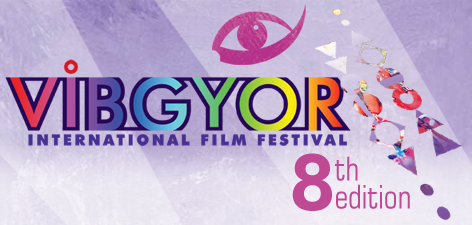
- Location: Thrissur, India
- Founded: 2006
- Hosted by: ViBGYOR Film collective
- Website: https://www.vibgyorfilms.org

ViBGYOR Film Festival is an international short and documentary film festival held annually in Thrissur City in Kerala state of India. ViBGYOR Film Festival is organised by ViBGYOR Film collective, a coalition of Chetana Media Institute, Nottam Traveling Film Festival, Navachitra Film Society, Visual Search, Moving Republic, Cense, GAIA, with the support of Thrissur Municipal Corporation, Jilla Panchayath, Federation of Film Societies of India, Kerala Chalachitra Academy, Information & Public Relations, ActionAid India, ICCO-South Asia and other various Film Societies.

== Film Spectrum ==
The ViBGYOR Film Festival is the largest alternate film festival in South Asia. It is a five-day-long film festival held every year at the Sangeetha Nataka Akademy Campus in, Thrissur. Celebrating Identities and Diversities is the central theme of ViBGYOR. VIBGYOR have 3 type film packages as listed blow

- Focus of the year package with different topics each year
- ViBGYOR Spectrum package divided into following seven sub categories
  - Identities
  - Rights
  - Environment and Developmentalism
  - Nation state
  - Gender and Sexuality
  - Fundamentalism V/s Diversity
  - Culture and Media
- Kerala Spectrum Package for films from Kerala

=== Genres ===
Animation, Documentary, Experimental, Music Video and Short films.

== Event history ==
- First Edition: February 2006
- Second Edition: May 2007
- Third Edition: February 2008
- Fourth edition: February 2009
- Fifth edition: February 2010
- Sixth edition: January 2011
- Seventh Edition: February 2012
- Eighth Edition: February 2013
- Ninth Edition: February 2014
- Tenth Edition: February 2015
- Eleventh Edition: April 2016
- Twelfth Edition: August 2017
- Thirteenth Edition: November 2019

== Themes ==
- 2006: ‘Water'
- 2007: ‘Earth'
- 2008: ‘Energy'
- 2009: ‘Food Sovereignty'
- 2010: ‘State, Communal and Developmental Conflicts in South Asia'
- 2011: ‘Political Filmmaking and Media Activism in South Asia'
- 2012: 'South Asia: Lives and Livelihood'
- 2013: 'Stolen Democracies'
- 2014: 'Gender Justice’
- 2015: 'Green Growth'
- 2016: 'Celebrating Cultural Diversity'
- 2017: 'Dissent'
- 2019: 'Rebooting :New India'

== Films screened ==
- Fragments of the past
- Maruvili
