= Mahtab Servati =

Iranian actress (born 1992)

- مهتاب ثروتی
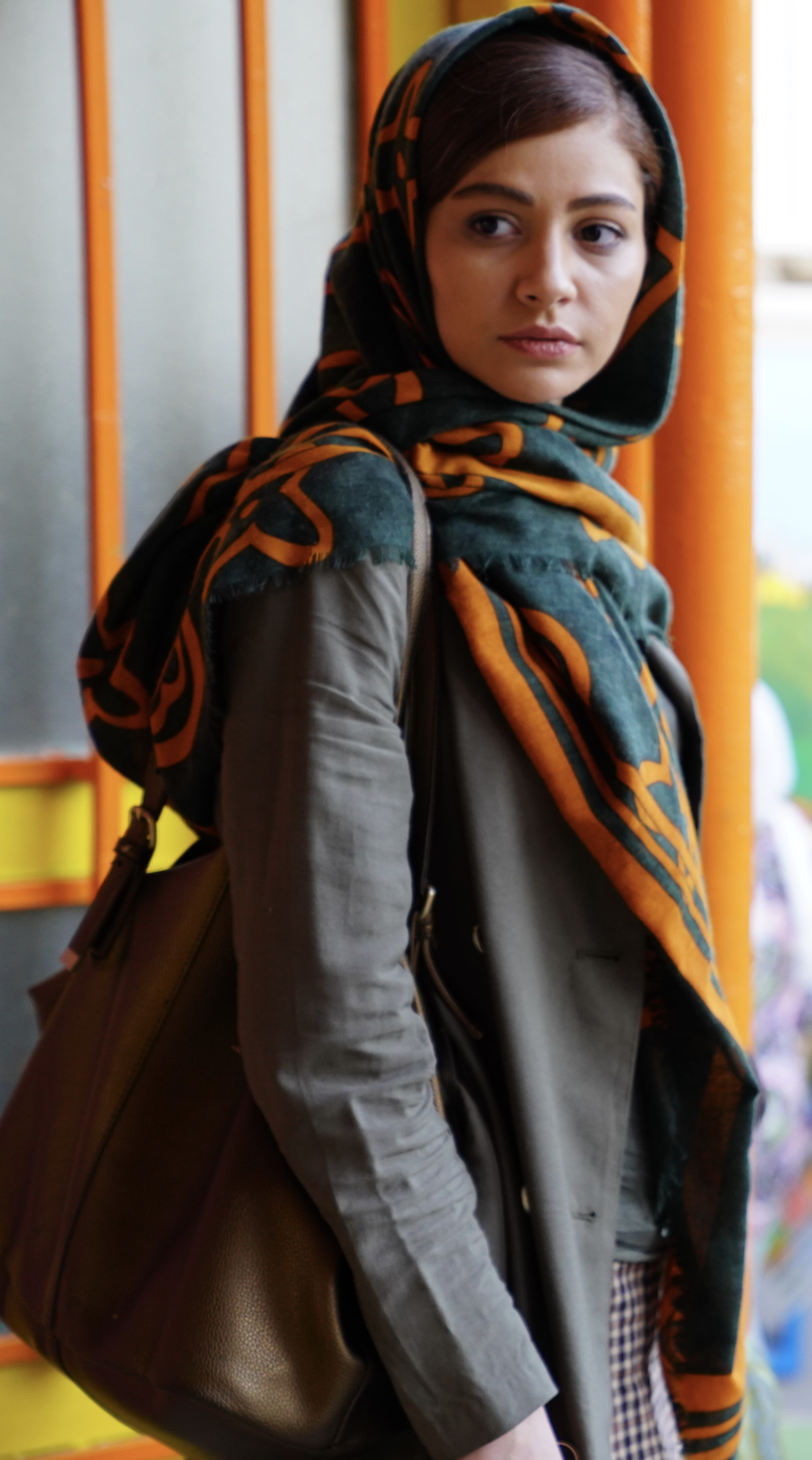
- Servati in the film Sweet Taste of Darkness (2023)
- Born: January 22, 1992 (age 34); Tehran, Iran
- Occupations: Actress; photographer
- Years active: 2013–present

Mahtab Servati (Persian: مهتاب ثروتی; born January 22, 1992) is an Iranian actress. She is best known for her performance in There Is No Evil (2020), which won the Golden Bear at the 70th Berlin International Film Festival. Servati later gained recognition and popularity through her web series roles in Once Upon a Time in Iran (2021–2022) and The Translator (2023).

== Early life and career ==
=== Early life ===
Mahtab Servati was born on January 22, 1992, in Tehran, Iran.

She initially studied photography but later quit it due to her "lack of interest". Her photography activities were mostly in the field of theater and behind the scenes photography. She worked as photographer in Rouhollah television series, My Gloomy Butterflies in a Wonderful Spring Morning theater, and The Last Whisper television film (all in 2013).

She gained an interest in acting after seeing actress Annali Shakouri's performance in Sajjad Afsharian's 2013 play My Gloomy Butterflies in a Wonderful Spring Morning.

After seeing the play, Servati attended Sajjad Afsharian's workshops for a year and then went on stage performing in 2014 for the first time.

=== 2014–2019: Career beginnings ===
Servati made her acting debut in Sajjad Afsharian's play Iran Vs Australia from 3 August to 6 September 2014 (she was also credited as co-writer in this play).

She later acted in Hossein Heydaripour's play What is Adel Ferdowsipour doing! from 26 April to 22 May 2015. The play consist of three parts, each part about one of the three members of the family. This time Servati had a lead role, performing the role of the daughter which now she's married and wishes to be a footballer.

Servati worked as co-photographer in the Direct-to-video The Gift (2015) directed by Amir Ahmad Ansari.

She made her screen debut in the 2015 IRIB TV2 war drama series Kimia in which she played Kimia's (Mehraveh Sharifinia) best friend, Salma, a pregnant southern woman in the midst of the Iran-Iraq war. Servati studied for the role of Salma by practicing her character's Khuzestani dialect. The series is the second longest-running Iranian television series after The Dots (2003).

Although it received mixed reviews from critics, the series was a commercial hit and became one of the highest-rated dramas in Iranian television history. Kimia receiving four Hafez Awards nominations including Best Television Series and Best Screenplay, winning the latter. She recalls her first on camera experience as "bad" due to her lack of knowledge of acting in front of camera.

Servati made her film debut in Majid Tavakoli's Born in 1987 which premiered at the 34th Fajr Film Festival in February 2016.

She worked as the main photographer in the 2016 play Khodabas.

She acted in Alireza Ajali's play A Few Slips on the Edge of the Heads of a Twisted Position from 30 October to 11 November 2016.

Servati starred as Fatemeh Dadman, a patient in the medical television series Nurses (2016) directed by Alireza Afkhami. The series earned three nominations including Best Television Series at the S like Series Awards.

From 8 June to 24 July 2017, she acted in Hassan Madjuni's play Incident with a Metranpazh.

Servati starred in the drama series In Search of Peace (2017) directed by Saeed Soltani as Sara Sari. The series received a nomination for Best Screenplay at the 18th Hafez Awards.

In 2017, she starred alongside Rana Azadivar and Amir Aghaei in the mystery drama film Privacy, as Dorsa, a teenage girl whom her ex-boyfriend is constantly harassing and threatening her.

Servati later went on stage performing Hassan Madjuni's play Incident with a Metranpazh again from 2 to 18 May 2018, this time on a different stage.

In 2018, Servati starred in two films, Pastarioni and Anonymity. Both films received mixed reviews.

In the rom-com film Pastarioni, she acted alongside Gohar Kheirandish as Fereshteh Torabi, a new chef who falls in love with her boss.

In the crime drama film Anonymity, she starred alongside Baran Kosari and Hassan Madjuni.

In 2019, she starred in her first short film Don't Forget Today as the female lead, which she and her husband Reza (Pedram Sharifi) are going to a hospital for a checkup before abortion.

Servati had her first lead role in a feature film in Behzad Khodsveysi's Daughters of Winter (2019), starring as Niloufar, a working class girl. The film deals with the Organ donation matter.

She later acted in two more short films, Shadow of Purple and A-orta (both in 2019).

Servati starred in the comedy film Hedgehog directed by Mastaneh Mohajer which features an ensemble cast. The filming started in October 2019 but it later was delayed due to the COVID-19 pendemic. The filming wrapped up on July 17, 2020. The film has not been released to the public yet.

She acted in Navid Memar's play Powdered Milk from December 30, 2019 to January 25, 2020.

=== 2020: Breakthrough ===
In February 2020, Servati acted in Ramin Akbari's monologue theater Stipulation Number Two after 6 months of practice for only 2 shows. She describes the shows as her most "satisfying" acting experience ever.

Servati explains her character as "A woman who constantly sees another woman in her house, and the chair that is in front of her all the time in the performance, is a souvenir of someone, and this woman's house is so small that she would hit the door and the wall while walking. From somewhere, this woman had a delusion that the chair was swelling and taking up the space of her home".

Servati starred as Nana in Mohammad Rasoulof's There Is No Evil (2020) which had its premiere at the 70th Berlin International Film Festival. The film received universal acclaim and won the Golden Bear. Servati's character Nana which appears in the third episode of the film, is a country girl who had a bond with the teacher of their village who got executed due to his different beliefs.

In April 2020, she starred in the war drama television series Soldier directed by Hadi Moghadamdoost, as Mina Moafi, after three years, returning to the small screen.

Servati starred in drama film Parva directed by Mehran Mahdavian which took part at the 11th Lleida International Film Festival's Cinema Del Mon section from 29 October to 8 November 2020 in Spain.

=== 2021–2022: Wide recognition ===
In 2021, Servati acted in a web series, two feature films, and three short films.

In the drama feature film At the End of the Day directed by Babak Bahram Beigi, she starred alongside Hanieh Tavassoli and Shabnam Moghaddami. The filming started in June 2021 and ended in the following month. The film has not been released to the public yet.

In the drama feature film Kulbarf directed by Milad Mansouri, she starred as a kurdish girl and had to learn kurdish dialect for her role as Chenur, a Kolbar girl.

The first short film Survivor of the Day was produced by Rasul Sadr Ameli and directed by his son, Mohammadreza Sadr Ameli.

In the second short film, Garden directed by Mostafa Soleimani which premiered at the 38th Tehran International Short Film Festival, Servati stars as a fugitive girl who asks an old man (Esmail Mehrabi) for help.

In the third short film Sweet Taste of Darkness directed by Mitra Raeesmohammadi, Servati stars as a sad and depressed young mother whose seven-year-old son identifies with the character of Batman and encourages his friends to perform risky actions. For this performance, Servati earned her first nomination for Best Actrees at the FFTG Awards in 2021.

She starred in the romance historical drama series Once Upon a Time in Iran directed by Tina Pakravan. Servati gained wide recognition and popularity for her role as Marie, an Iranian-German painter whose German mother has been exiled to Siberia by the Soviet forces following the Anglo-Soviet invasion of Iran in 1941 during World War II. The series met with critical acclaim and was widely praised for its performances.

In 2022, Servati starred in the short film Ashes directed by Saeedeh Dalirian which premiered at the 26th Canberra Short Film Festival.

Servati starred as Fereshteh, an aspiring actress in the 2022 mystery drama film The Town alongside Saed Soheili, directed by Ali Hazrati. The film had its premiere at the 40th Fajr Film Festival and earned 3 nominations.

Although the film received mixed reviews, critics praised Servati's performance. Filimo's Kamal Pourkaveh called Servati's performance "worthy of attention" and listed her performance as the top 3 things of the film.

=== 2023: Leading role ===
In 2023, she got her first leading role in a series starring in the crime mystery web series The Translator as Ghazaleh, a young translator who is seeking the truth about her brother's mysterious death. The series was directed by Bahram Tavakoli who previously worked as the screenwriter for the critically acclaimed series Blue Whale (2019).

Servati starred in the sport drama film Hook (2023) directed by Hossein Rigi which had its premiere at the 41st Fajr International Film Festival. She had to learn the Balochi dialect due to her character's origin.

== Personal life ==
Servati lives with her parents and has a brother named Amir and a sister named Negin.

She has cited Yalda Night as her favorite holiday.

== Filmography ==
=== Film ===
Year	Title	Role	Director	Notes	Ref(s)
2016	Born in 1987	Nima's wife	Majid Tavakoli		
2017	Privacy	Dorsa	Ahmad Moazemi		
2018	Pastarioni	Fereshteh Torabi	Soheil Moafagh		
2018	Anonymity	Mona	Alireza Samadi		
2019	Don't Forget Today	The Wife	Ahmad Monajemi	Short film	
2019	Daughters of Winter	Niloofar	Behzad Khodaveysi		
2019	Shadow of Purple	Nasim Sahraee	Sogol Khaleghi	Short film	
2019	A-orta		Saeed Zarei	Short film	
2020	There Is No Evil	Nana	Mohammad Rasoulof		
2020	Parva		Mehran Mahdavian		
2021	Kulbarf	Chenur	Milad Mansouri		
2021	Survivor of the Day		Mohammad Reza Sadrameli	Short film	
2021	Garden		Mostafa Soleimani	Short film	
2021	Sweet Taste of Darkness	The Mother	Mitra Raeesmohammadi	Short film	
2022	Ashes		Saeedeh Dalirian	Short film	
2022	The Town	Fereshteh	Ali Hazrati		
2023	Hook	Mahour	Hossein Rigi		
2023	Hedgehog		Mastaneh Mohajer		
2024	Nowruz		Soheil Moafagh		
2025	At the End of the Day		Babak Bahram Beigi		
2026	Hale Khoobe Zan		Mehdi Barzoki		
2026	Idol		Hamid Nematollah		

=== Web ===
Year	Title	Role	Director	Platform	Notes	Ref(s)
2021–2022	Once Upon a Time in Iran	Marie	Tina Pakravan	Namava	Main role; 15 episodes	
2023	The Translator	Ghazaleh Safavi	Bahram Tavakoli	Namava	Leading role; 13 episodes	
2023–2024	Accomplice	Nasrin Nazemi	Maziar Miri	Namava	Main role; miniseries	
2026	The Heartless	Atefeh Ardavan	Kamal Tabrizi	Filmnet	Main role	

=== Television ===
Year	Title	Role	Director	Network	Notes	Ref(s)
2015–2016	Kimia	Salma	Javad Afshar	IRIB TV2	Recurring role	
2017	Nurses	Fatemeh Dadman	Alireza Afkhami	IRIB TV1	Recurring role	
2017	In Search of Peace	Sara Sari	Saeed Soltani	IRIB TV5	Recurring role	
2020	Soldier	Mina Moafi	Hadi Moghadamdoost	IRIB TV3	Recurring role	

== Photography ==
Year	Title	Director	Notes	Ref.
2013	Rouhollah	Rama Ghavidel	Television series	
2013	My Gloomy Butterflies in a Wonderful Spring Morning	Sogol Ghalatian	Theater	
2013	The Last Whisper	Sajjad Shahriari	Television film	
2015	The Gift	Amir Ahmad Ansari	Direct-to-video	
2016	Khodabas	Javad Khorsha, Saleh Alavizadeh	Theater	

== Theatre ==
Year	Title	Playwright	Director	Stage	Ref(s)
2014	Iran VS Australia	Ilia Tahmatni	Sajjad Afsharian	Arasbaran Cultural Center	
2015	What Is Adel Ferdowsipour Doing!	Saghar Khajeh Amiri	Hossein Heydaripour	Niavaran Cultural Center	
2016	A Few Slips on the Edge of the Heads of a Twisted Position	Alireza Ajali		Hamoon Theatre	
2017	Incident with a Metranpazh	Alexander Vampilov	Hassan Madjuni	Sepand Theater	
2018	Incident with a Metranpazh	Alexander Vampilov	Hassan Madjuni	Shahrzad Theater Complex	
2019–2020	Powdered Milk	Navid Memar		Iranshahr Theater	
2020	Stipulation Number Two	Ramin Akbari		RooBeRoo Mansion	
2024	New Jersey	Saleh Alavi Zadeh	Saeed Dashti	Malek Theater	

== Influences ==
Servati has cited Mohammad Rasoulof's The White Meadows (2009), Rasoul Mollagholipour's M for Mother (2006), Kim Ki-duk's Spring, Summer, Fall, Winter... and Spring (2003) and 3-Iron (2004), and Kamal Tabrizi's A Piece of Bread (2004) as the films that genuinely moved her.

She has cited Abdoldreza Kahani, Dariush Mehrjui and Khosrow Shakibai as the artists whom she likes to work with and love the cinematic atmosphere of their works, mentioning Needlessly and Causelessly (2012) as her favorite film of Kahani.

She has cited Anna Karenina as her favourite fictional character to play.

She has stated that her favourite music genres are Jazz, Persian hip hop and Classic, mentioning Mohammadreza Shajarian as one of her favourite classic singers.

She has cited Divaneye Man by Fereydoun Foroughi as her favorite song of all time.

== Awards and nominations ==
Name of the award ceremony, year presented, category, nominee of the award, and the result of the nomination
Award	Year	Category	Nominated Work	Result	Ref.
Fajr Film Festival	2026	Best Actress in a Leading Role	Hale Khoobe Zan	Nominated	
FFTG Awards	2021	Best Actress	Sweet Taste of Darkness	Nominated	
Hafez Awards	2025	Best Actress – Theatre	New Jersey	Nominated	
