= 68th Sydney Film Festival =

2021 film festival

- Opening film: Here Out West by Fadia Abboud, Lucy Gaffy, Julie Kalceff, Ana Kokkinos, and Leah Purcell
- Closing film: The French Dispatch by Wes Anderson
- Location: Sydney, New South Wales, Australia
- Founded: 1954
- Awards: Sydney Film Prize: There Is No Evil
- No. of films: 233 from 69 countries
- Festival date: 3–21 November 2021
- Website: sff.org.au

Sydney Film Festival
- 69th 67th

The 68th annual Sydney Film Festival was held from 3 to 21 November 2021. The festival, which traditionally takes place in June, was postponed to August 2021 and eventually rescheduled to be held in November due to the COVID-19 pandemic. The film screenings were staged as a "hybrid" of in-person and digital. It marked as the first major festival following the lifting of the lockdown in New South Wales.

Anthology film Here Out West opened the festival, while Wes Anderson's The French Dispatch was the closing film. Drama film There Is No Evil won the most prestigious award, Sydney Film Prize.

== Juries ==
=== Sydney Film Prize ===
The following were named as the festival juries:

- David Michôd, Australian writer and director – Jury President
- Simon Baker, Australian actor
- Kyas Hepworth, National Indigenous Television Head of Commissioning and Programming
- Maya Newell, Australian filmmaker
- Clara Law, Hong Kong-Australian filmmaker

== Official Selection ==
=== In competition ===
The following films were selected for the main international competition:

English title	Original title	Director(s)	Production country
Bad Luck Banging or Loony Porn	Babardeală cu bucluc sau porno balamuc	Radu Jude	Romania, Luxembourg, Czech Republic, Croatia
Drive My Car	ドライブ・マイ・カー	Ryusuke Hamaguchi	Japan
The Drover's Wife		Leah Purcell	Australia
Flee	Flugt	Jonas Poher Rasmussen	Denmark, France, Sweden, Norway
The Hand of God	È stata la mano di Dio	Paolo Sorrentino	Italy
Limbo		Ben Sharrock	United Kingdom
Memoria		Apichatpong Weerasethakul	Colombia, Thailand, United Kingdom, Mexico, France, Germany, Qatar
Petite Maman		Céline Sciamma	France
Quo Vadis, Aida?		Jasmila Žbanić	Bosnia and Herzegovina, Austria, Romania, Netherlands, Germany, Poland, France, Norway, Turkey
The Story of My Wife	A feleségem története	Ildikó Enyedi	Hungary, Germany, Italy, France
There Is No Evil	شیطان وجود ندارد	Mohammad Rasoulof	Iran, Germany, Czechia
Undine		Christian Petzold	Germany, France

Highlighted title indicates Sydney Film Prize winner.

=== Documentary Australia Foundation Award ===
English title	Original title	Director(s)
The Bowraville Murders		Allan Clarke
The Department		Sascha Ettinger Epstein
A Fire Inside		Justin Krook, Luke Mazzaferro
I'm Wanita		Matthew Walker
Incarceration Nation		Dean Gibson
Ithaka		Ben Lawrence
The Kids		Eddie Martin
Strong Female Lead		Tosca Looby
Television Event		Jeff Daniels
Under the Volcano		Gracie Otto
Unseen Skies		Yaara Bou Melhem
When the Camera Stopped Rolling		Jane Castle

=== Special Presentations ===
English title	Original title	Director(s)	Production country
Bergman Island		Mia Hansen-Løve	France, Belgium, Germany, Sweden
Blue Bayou		Justin Chon	United States
Bosch & Rockit		Tyler Atkins	Australia
Burning		Eva Orner	Australia
Great Freedom	Große Freiheit	Sebastian Meise	Austria, Germany
Lingui, The Sacred Bonds	Lingui	Mahamat-Saleh Haroun	Chad, France, Belgium, Germany
Love Songs for Tough Guys	Cette musique ne joue pour personne	Samuel Benchetrit	France, Belgium
Parallel Mothers	Madres paralelas	Pedro Almodóvar	Spain
Paris, 13th District	Les Olympiades	Jacques Audiard	France
The Power of the Dog		Jane Campion	New Zealand, Australia
River		Jennifer Peedom	Australia
Titane		Julia Ducournau	France, Belgium
Wash My Soul in the River's Flow		Philippa Bateman	Australia
The Worst Person in the World	Verdens verste menneske	Joachim Trier	Norway, France, Sweden, Denmark
Zola		Janicza Bravo	United States

=== Features ===
English title	Original title	Director(s)	Production country
After Love		Aleem Khan	United Kingdom
Amparo		Simón Mesa Soto	Colombia, Sweden, Qatar
Anaïs in Love	Les Amours d'Anaïs	Charline Bourgeois-Tacquet	France
Apples	Μήλα	Christos Nikou	Greece, Poland, Slovenia
Beginning	დასაწყისი	Dea Kulumbegashvili	Georgia, France
Brighton 4th		Levan Koguashvili	Georgia, Russia, Bulgaria, Monaco, United States
The Card Counter		Paul Schrader	United States, United Kingdom, China
Cinema Sabaya		Orit Fouks Rotem	Belgium
Come Here	ใจจำลอง	Anocha Suwichakornpong	Thailand
Compartment No. 6	Hytti nro 6	Juho Kuosmanen	Finland, Germany, Estonia
A Cop Movie	Una película de policías	Alonso Ruizpalacios	Mexico
Crossing Paths		JJ Winlove	Australia
Cryptozoo		Dash Shaw	United States
Dear Evan Hansen		Stephen Chbosky	United States
The Dog Who Wouldn't Be Quiet	El perro que no calla	Ana Katz	Argentina
El Planeta		Amalia Ulman	Spain, United States
Erna at War	Erna i krig	Henrik Ruben Genz	Denmark, Estonia, Belgium
The Eyes of Tammy Faye		Michael Showalter	United States
Fist of Fury Noongar Daa (Note: Fist of Fury screened at the festival is dubbed in Noongar language.)		Kylie Bracknell (Note: The director of the dubbed version.)	Hong Kong, Australia
Friends and Strangers		James Vaughan	Australia
The Gravedigger's Wife	La femme du fossoyeur	Khadar Ayderus Ahmed	Finland, Germany, France
A Hero	قهرمان	Asghar Farhadi	Iran, France
Hit the Road	جاده خاکی	Panah Panahi	Iran
Honey Cigar	Cigare au miel	Kamir Aïnouz	France, Algeria, Belgium
Just Like That	Aise Hee	Kislay Kislay	India
The Justice of Bunny King		Gaysorn Thavat	New Zealand
King Richard		Reinaldo Marcus Green	United States
Last Film Show	Chhello Show	Pan Nalin	India
Long Weekend		Steve Basilone	United States
Memory Box		Joana Hadjithomas, Khalil Joreige	France, Lebanon, Canada, Qatar
Moffie		Oliver Hermanus	South Africa, United Kingdom
My Best Part	Garçon chiffon	Nicolas Maury	France
Never Gonna Snow Again	Śniegu już nigdy nie będzie	Małgorzata Szumowska, Michał Englert	Poland, Germany
Nowhere Special		Uberto Pasolini	Italy, France
One Second	一秒钟	Zhang Yimou	China
Pompo: The Cinéphile	映画大好きポンポさん	Takayuki Hirao	Japan
Prayers for the Stolen	Noche de fuego	Tatiana Huezo	Mexico, Germany, Brazil, Qatar
Real		Aki Omoshaybi	United Kingdom
Rehana Maryam Noor		Abdullah Mohammad Saad	Bangladesh, Singapore, Qatar
Simple Passion	Passion simple	Danielle Arbid	France, Belgium
Striding Into the Wind	野马分鬃	Wei Shujun	China
Swan Song		Todd Stephens	United States
The Swordsman	검객	Choi Jae-hoon	South Korea
A Tale of Love and Desire	Une histoire d'amour et de désir	Leyla Bouzid	France, Tunisia
True Mothers	朝が来る	Naomi Kawase	Japan
The Tsugua Diaries	Diários de Otsoga	Maureen Fazendeiro, Miguel Gomes	Portugal
Wheel of Fortune and Fantasy	偶然と想像	Ryusuke Hamaguchi	Japan
When Pomegranates Howl		Granaz Moussavi	Australia, Afghanistan
The Year of the Everlasting Storm		Jafar Panahi, Anthony Chen, Malik Vitthal, Laura Poitras, Dominga Sotomayor Castillo, David Lowery, Apichatpong Weerasethakul	United States, Iran, Chile, Thailand, United Kingdom, Singapore

=== Special Screening ===
English title	Original title	Director(s)	Production country
Dune		Denis Villeneuve	United States, Hungary, Jordan, United Arab Emirates, Norway, Canada

=== International Documentaries ===
English title	Original title	Director(s)	Production country
Anonymous Club		Danny Cohen	Australia
Ascension		Jessica Kingdon	United States
A Black Jesus		Luca Lucchesi	Germany
Blind Ambition		Robert Coe, Warwick Ross	Australia
City Hall		Frederick Wiseman	United States
Cow		Andrea Arnold	United Kingdom
The Filmmaker's House		Marc Isaacs	United Kingdom
The First 54 Years — An Abbreviated Manual for Military Occupation		Avi Mograbi	France, Finland, Germany
Four Seasons in a Day		Annabel Verbeke	Belgium, Norway, Croatia, Lithuania
Hallelujah: Leonard Cohen, A Journey, A Song		Dan Geller, Dayna Goldfine	United States
John Farrow: Hollywood's Man in the Shadows		Claude Gonzalez, Frans Vandenburg	Australia
The Last Hillbilly		Diane Sara Bouzgarrou, Thomas Jenkoe	France, Qatar
The Last Shelter	Le dernier refuge	Ousmane Samassekou	France, Mali, South Africa
Le temps perdu	El tiempo perdido	María Álvarez	Argentina
Like the Wind		Ted McDonnell	Australia, Hong Kong
The Lost Leonardo		Andreas Koefoed	Denmark, France, Sweden
The Magnitude of All Things		Jennifer Abbott	Canada
Mariner of the Mountains	Marinheiro das montanhas	Karim Aïnouz	Brazil, France, Germany
President		Camilla Nielsson	Denmark, United States, Norway
Radiograph of a Family		Firouzeh Khosrovani	Norway, Iran, Switzerland
The Rescue		Elizabeth Chai Vasarhelyi, Jimmy Chin	United States, United Kingdom
The Seeds of Vandana Shiva		James Becket, Camilla Becket	Australia, United States
The Story of Film: A New Generation		Mark Cousins	United Kingdom
Street Gang: How We Got to Sesame Street		Marilyn Agrelo	United States
Taming the Garden	მოთვინიერება	Salomé Jashi	Switzerland, Germany, Georgia
When a City Rises		Iris Kwong, Ip Kar Man, Cathy Chu, Han Yan Yuen, Huang Yuk-kwok, Jenn Lee, Evie Cheung	Hong Kong
White Cube		Renzo Martens	Netherlands, Democratic Republic of the Congo, Belgium
Writing with Fire		Sushmit Ghosh, Rintu Thomas	India

=== Europe! Voices of Women in Film ===
English title	Original title	Director(s)	Production country
From the Wild Sea	Fra det vilde hav	Robin Petré	Denmark
Green Sea	Πράσινη Θάλασσα	Angeliki Antoniou	Greece, Germany
Hive	Zgjoi	Blerta Basholli	Kosovo, Switzerland, North Macedonia, Albania
How to Kill a Cloud	Näin pilvet kuolevat	Tuija Halttunen	Finland, Denmark
Last Days of Spring	La última primavera	Isabel Lamberti	Netherlands, Spain
Nico		Eline Gehring	Germany
Pleasure		Ninja Thyberg	Sweden, Netherlands, France
Reconciliation	Odpuščanje	Marija Zidar	Slovenia, Serbia, Montenegro, Kosovo
Slalom		Charlène Favier	France
Why Not You	Hochwald	Evi Romen	Austria, Belgium

=== First Nations ===
English title	Original title	Director(s)	Production country
Araatika: Rise Up!		Larissa Behrendt	Australia
The Bowraville Murders		Allan Clarke	Australia
Night Raiders		Danis Goulet	Canada, New Zealand
Wild Indian		Lyle Mitchell Corbine Jr.	United States

=== Freak Me Out ===
English title	Original title	Director(s)	Production country
The Beta Test		Jim Cummings, PJ McCabe	United States, United Kingdom
Censor		Prano Bailey-Bond	United Kingdom
Gaia		Jaco Bouwer	South Africa
The Spine of Night		Philip Gelatt, Morgan Galen King	United States
Wyrmwood: Apocalypse		Kiah Roache-Turner	Australia

== Awards ==
The following awards were presented at the festival:

- Sydney Film Prize: There Is No Evil by Mohammad Rasoulof
- Sydney UNESCO City of Film Award: Karina Holden
- Documentary Australia Award for Australian Documentary: I'm Wanita by Matthew Walker
- Sustainable Future Award: Burning by Eva Orner
- Dendy Awards for Australian Short Films
  - Dendy Live Action Short Award: Peeps by Sophie Somerville
  - Rouben Mamoulian Award for Best Director: Taylor Ferguson for tough
  - Yoram Gross Animation Award: Freedom Swimmer by Olivia Martin-McGuire

=== Audience Awards ===
The following films won the Audience Awards, voted by the festival audience.

==== Best Narrative Feature Top Five ====
- Beautiful Minds by Bernard Campan and Alexandre Jollien
- Wyrmwood: Apocalypse by Kiah Roache-Turner
- Here Out West by Fadia Abboud, Lucy Gaffy, Julie Kalceff, Ana Kokkinos, and Leah Purcell
- Friends and Strangers by James Vaughan
- Quo Vadis, Aida? by Jasmila Žbanić

==== Best Documentary Top Five ====
- Blind Ambition by Robert Coe and Warwick Ross
- I'm Wanita by Matthew Walker
- When the Camera Stopped Rolling by Jane Castle
- The Seeds of Vandana Shiva by James Becket and Camilla Becket
- Araatika: Rise Up! by Larissa Behrendt and Ithaka by Ben Lawrence
