= The Seed of the Sacred Fig =

2024 film by Mohammad Rasoulof

- French theatrical release poster
- Persian: دانه‌ی انجیر معابد
- Directed by: Mohammad Rasoulof
- Written by: Mohammad Rasoulof
- Produced by: Mohammad Rasoulof; Rozita Hendijanian; Amin Sadraei; Jean-Christophe Simon; Mani Tilgner
- Starring: Soheila Golestani; Missagh Zareh; Mahsa Rostami; Setareh Maleki; Niousha Akhshi; Amineh Arani
- Cinematography: Pooyan Aghababaei
- Edited by: Andrew Bird
- Music by: Karzan Mahmood
- Production companies: Run Way Pictures; Parallel45; Arte France Cinéma
- Distributed by: Pyramide Distribution (France); Alamode Film (Germany)
- Release dates: 24 May 2024 (Cannes); 18 September 2024 (France); 26 December 2024 (Germany)
- Running time: 168 minutes
- Countries: Germany; Iran; France
- Language: Persian
- Box office: $6.6 million

The Seed of the Sacred Fig (Persian: دانه‌ی انجیر معابد, romanized: Dāne-ye anjīr-e ma'ābed) is a 2024 political drama film written, co-produced and directed by Mohammad Rasoulof. Its plot centers on Iman, an investigating judge in the Revolutionary Court in Tehran, who grapples with paranoia as nationwide political protests, caused by the death of a young woman, intensify and his gun mysteriously disappears, making him distrust his wife and daughters. It stars Soheila Golestani, Missagh Zareh, Mahsa Rostami and Setareh Maleki. The fictional narrative is combined with real images of the 2022–2023 protests in Iran that were violently suppressed by Iranian authorities.

The Seed of the Sacred Fig had its world premiere in the main competition of the 77th Cannes Film Festival on 24 May 2024, where it won the Special Jury Prize. Ahead of its premiere, Rasoulof was sentenced to eight years in prison by Iranian authorities. After successfully fleeing to Germany, Rasoulof and other cast and crew members attended the Cannes' red carpet premiere.

The film received critical acclaim and was theatrically released in France on 18 September 2024, and in Germany on 26 December 2024. It was named the Best International Film of 2024 by the National Board of Review. It was nominated for Best Motion Picture – Non-English Language at the 82nd Golden Globe Awards, as well as for Best Film Not in the English Language at the 78th British Academy Film Awards. At the 97th Academy Awards, it was nominated for Best International Feature Film as the German entry.

== Plot ==
Iman, a devout and honest lawyer, lives with his wife, Najmeh, and their two daughters, Rezvan and Sana. Iman has recently been appointed as an investigating judge in the Revolutionary Court in Tehran. The position provides him a higher salary and a larger apartment for his family, which his wife wants.

As the nationwide political protests against the authoritarian government unfold following the death of a young woman, Iman discovers that he was not hired to use his legal expertise to investigate cases. He is expected to approve judgments presented to him by his superiors without assessing the evidence, including death sentences, and he learns his predecessor was fired for refusing. The position requires Iman to remain anonymous. He is ordered to withhold information from friends and family who could be targeted as a means of pressuring him. The government issues Iman a handgun for his family's protection, but he is woefully unprepared to handle the gun and fails to properly store it in a secure compartment in the house.

When Sadaf, a good friend of Rezvan's, is shot in the face on the street during a demonstration against compulsory hijab, Najmeh and her daughters provide first aid in their apartment. They decide to keep the incident secret from Iman. A short time later, Sadaf is arrested. Najmeh, who is just as devout as Iman, advises her daughters to stay away from their revolutionary friends, putting a strain on the family.

As nationwide political protests intensify, Iman becomes mistrustful and paranoid. The protests force him to sign several hundred sentences a day. Meanwhile, Rezvan and Sana follow the protests in horror on social media. Rezvan eventually rebels against her father at dinner, causing Iman to berate her for her feminist sensibilities, which he dismisses as enemy propaganda.

At the same time, Iman's handgun mysteriously disappears and he becomes suspicious, believing that someone in his family has taken it and is lying to him, and he begins to distrust his wife and daughters. He forces both daughters and his wife to meet with a colleague, Alireza, for interrogation. Iman justifies this treatment by saying that he no longer feels safe in his own home since he can no longer trust his family. Iman's name, photo and address are eventually posted on social media. For their own protection, Iman decides to drive with his family to his childhood home in the mountains. Before he leaves, a colleague gives him a firearm for protection to make up for the one that has disappeared. During the car ride, the family encounters a couple who recognize Iman. A chase ensues, as Iman runs them off the road and threatens them. Inside the car, Sana reveals to Rezvan that she has taken the gun, and Rezvan takes it from her and stows it in the back seat.

Upon reaching his childhood home, Iman puts the entire family on trial. He interrogates and tries to force them to confess on a camcorder. Both the girls continue to deny involvement, so Najmeh takes the blame to protect them, but then, to try and protect her mother and sister, Rezvan says that she has the gun. However, when she takes Iman to retrieve it, she discovers that it is missing from the car. Iman locks Rezvan and Najmeh up in separate rooms in the basement, but Sana escapes with the gun. After setting a trap, she is able to lock Iman in a shed and free her sister and mother before he breaks out. Following a lengthy chase scene in the ruins of a town, Iman eventually catches Najmeh, and her screams lead Sana and Rezvan to them. Sana raises her gun at her father, but she hesitates to fire. When her father moves toward her, his second gun in his hand, she panics and shoots the ground beneath him. The ground collapses and Iman falls to his presumed death.

The film ends with real footage captured on mobile phones depicting women protesting in the streets of Tehran, hair uncovered, waving their headscarves in the air.

== Cast ==
- Soheila Golestani as Najmeh
- Missagh Zareh as Iman
- Mahsa Rostami as Rezvan
- Setareh Maleki as Sana
- Niousha Akhshi as Sadaf
- Amineh Mazrouie Arani as Woman in car
- Reza Akhlaghirad as Ghaderi
- Shiva Ordooie as Fateme

== Background ==
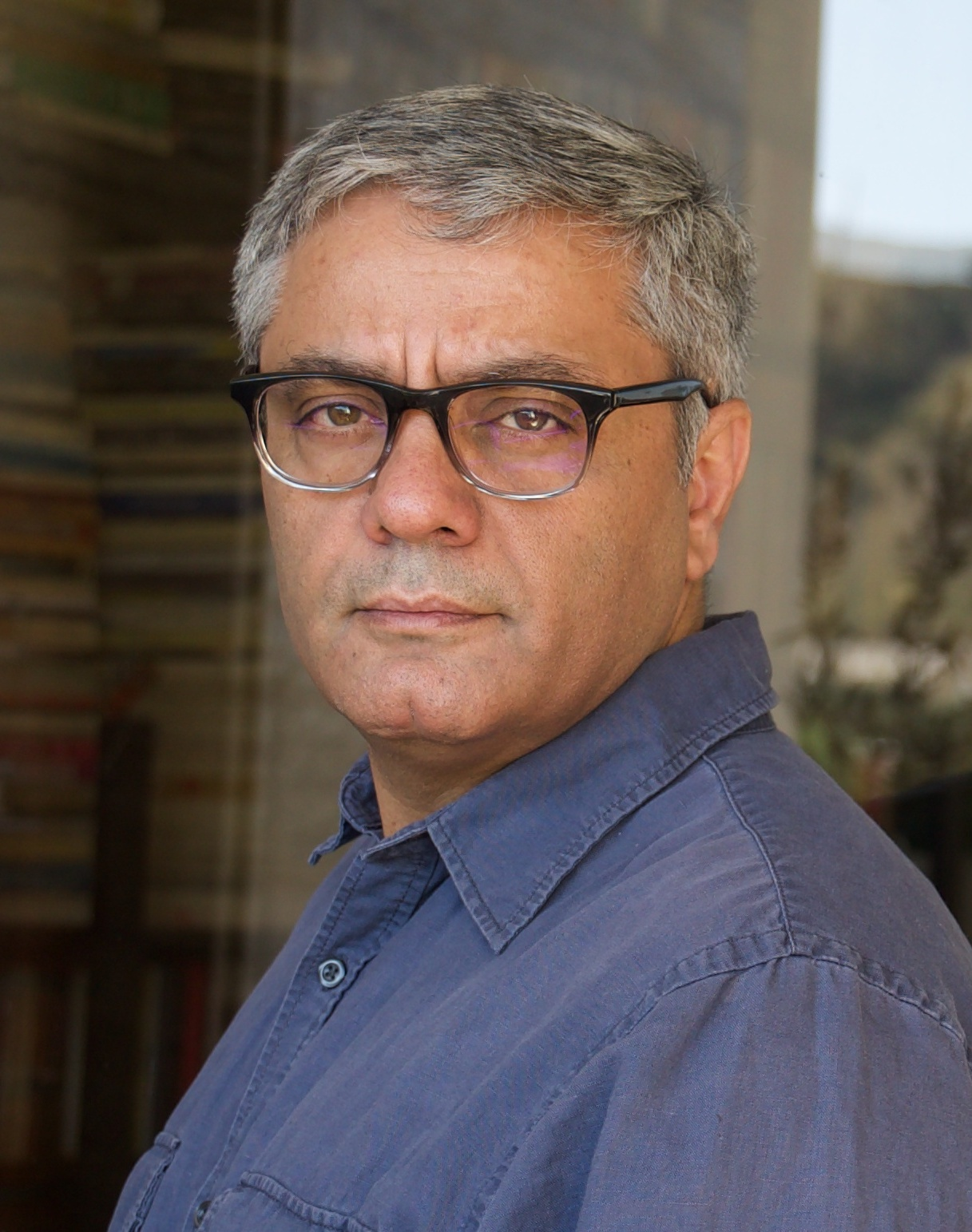
Mohammad Rasoulof

In the past, director Mohammad Rasoulof had repeatedly violated Iranian censorship regulations with his films and was given three prison sentences as well as bans on working and leaving the country. In 2020, his film There Is No Evil won the top prize at the 70th Berlin International Film Festival, where it was awarded in his absence.

Rasoulof was originally scheduled to take part in the 2023 Cannes Film Festival as a jury member of the Un Certain Regard section. However, he was arrested in July 2022 after criticizing the government's crackdown on protestors in the southwestern city of Abadan over a deadly building collapse. He was temporarily released from prison in February 2023 due to his health. Rasoulof was later pardoned and sentenced to a year in prison and a two-year ban on leaving Iran for "propaganda against the regime."

Following the Cannes selection announcement, the Iranian authorities interrogated the cast and crew, banning them from leaving the country, and pressuring them to convince Rasoulof to withdraw the film from the festival line-up. On 8 May 2024, Rasoulof's lawyer announced that the director had been sentenced to eight years in prison as well as flogging, a fine and confiscation of his property.

Shortly after, Rasoulof and some cast (including Mahsa Rostami, Setareh Maleki, and Niousha Akhshi) and crew members managed to flee to Europe. Rasoulof described his 28-day escape from Iran as an "exhausting, long, complicated, and anguishing journey". He traveled on foot between border villages, ultimately arriving in a town with a German consulate which identified him using his fingerprints and issued him a temporary travel document which he used to travel to Germany. Rasoulof and part of the cast and crew attended the film's red carpet at Cannes on 24 May 2024. During his appearance, he held two photographs displaying the actors Soheila Golestani and Missagh Zareh, both of whom have been unable to leave Iran.

== Production ==
The Seed of the Sacred Fig is the tenth directorial work of Mohammad Rasoulof. The title refers to a species of fig that spreads by "wrapping itself around another tree and eventually strangling it". This was seen as a symbol of the theocratic regime in Iran. Rasoulof wrote the screenplay and cast Missagh Zareh and Soheila Golestani in the main roles of the regime-loyal couple, Iman and Najmeh, respectively. Golestani had previously campaigned against wearing the hijab during the protests and had been arrested for this. Rasoulof also cast Mahsa Rostami and Setareh Maleki as the daughters, Rezvan and Sana.

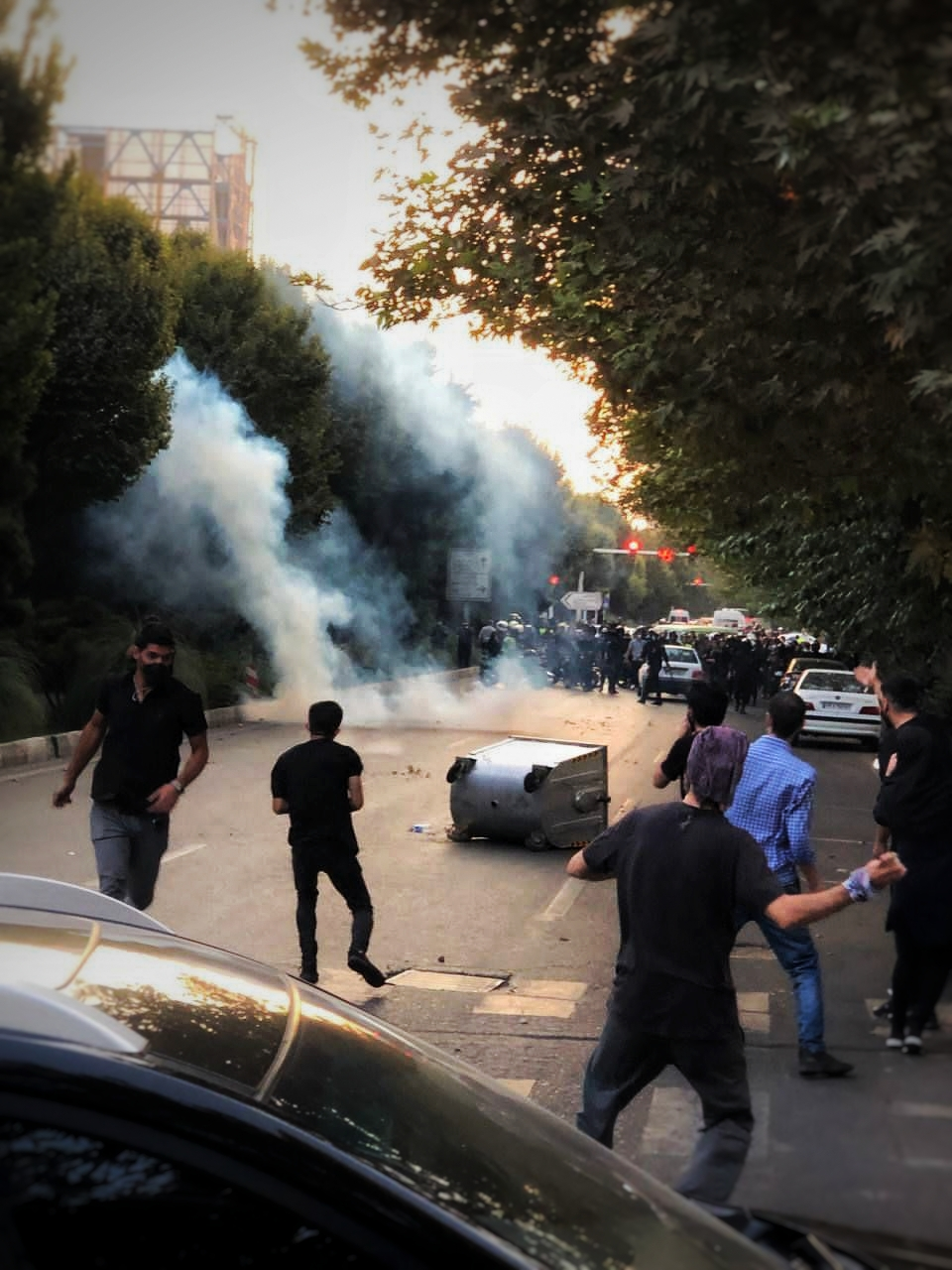
Mahsa Amini protests in Tehran, 2022

The filming of The Seed of the Sacred Fig took place in secret and lasted about 70 days, from late December 2023 to March 2024. Rasoulof described the process as "difficult". He could only film for a few days at a time before having to take breaks. He worked with cinematographer Pooyan Aghababaei. The director stated that he was in the middle of filming when he learned of his renewed prison sentence. He had counted on the appeal process taking a long time to review his case. Additionally, this period coincided with Nowruz (New Year) celebrations in Iran, which lasted two weeks. Ultimately, Rasoulof managed to finish the film by the end of the holidays. After the appeals court confirmed the verdict, he was forced to decide within a two-hour window whether to remain in Iran and surrender or flee. Leaving all his electronic devices at home, he escaped to a safe location before crossing the Iranian border on foot.

The footage was smuggled out of Iran to Hamburg, where it was edited by Andrew Bird, with whom Rasoulof had previously worked. Post-production took place in Germany. Between the film's fictional scenes, Bird incorporated real footage of the political protests following the death of Iranian Kurdish woman Mahsa Amini in police custody in Tehran on 16 September 2022. The final 168-minute version includes real and graphic internet videos of the demonstrations and the subsequent violent crackdown by authorities.

Rasoulof produced the film alongside Amin Sadraei, Mani Tilgner, Rozita Hendijanian, and Jean-Christophe Simon. The production companies involved were Run Way Pictures (Germany) and Parallel45 (France). It was co-produced by Arte France Cinéma with support from MOIN Filmförderung Hamburg Schleswig-Holstein. The Berlin-based company Films Boutique is handling worldwide sales.

== Release ==
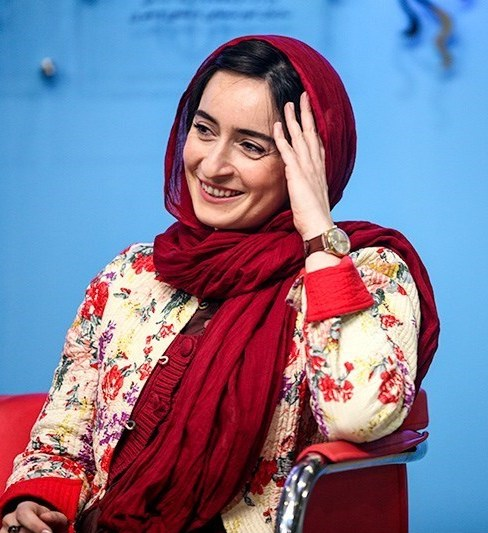
Leading actress Soheila Golestani could not attend the premiere in Cannes

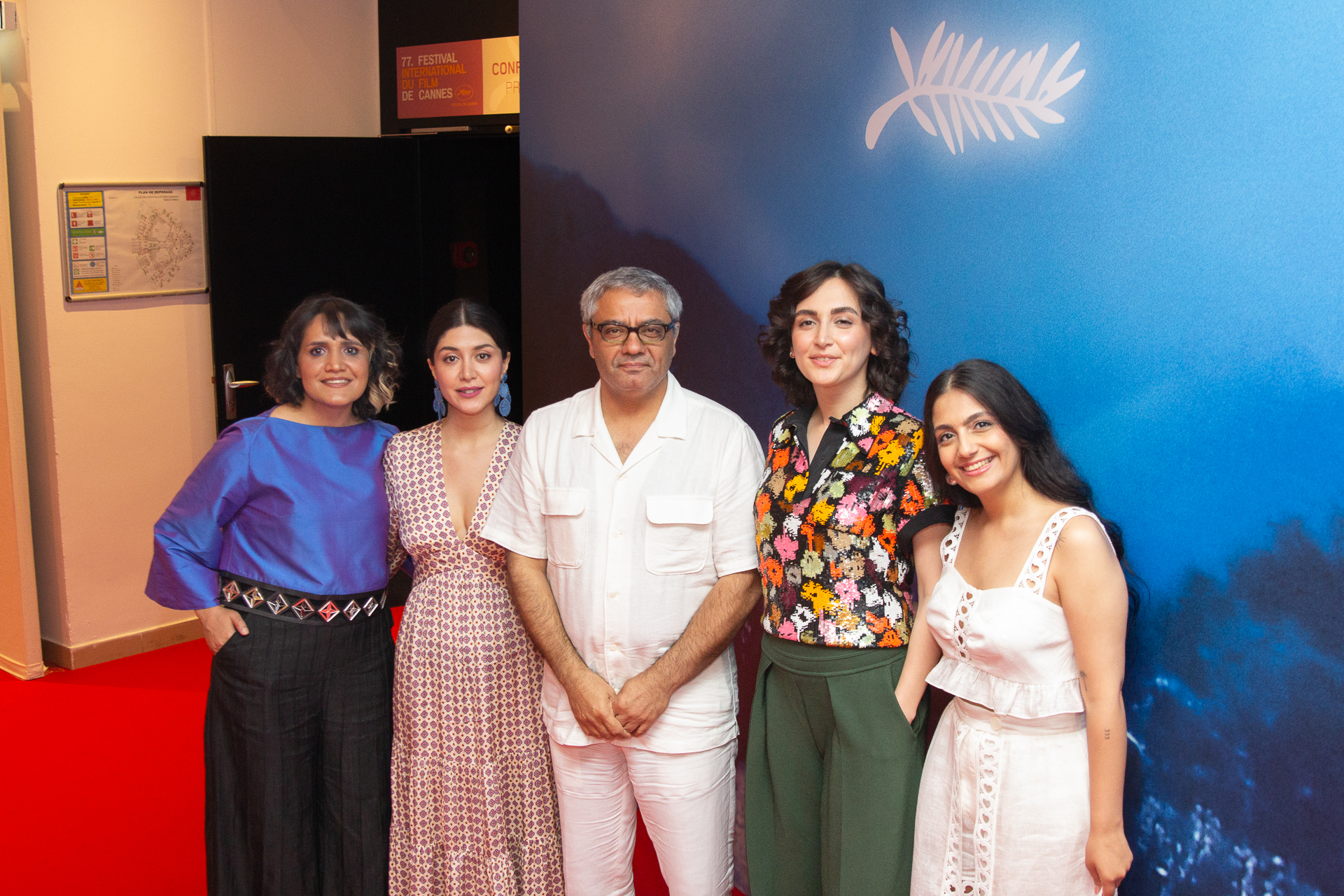
Rasoulof with part of his acting ensemble in Cannes

The Seed of the Sacred Fig was selected to compete for the Palme d'Or at the 2024 Cannes Film Festival, where it had its world premiere on 24 May 2024, and went on to receive a special award by the jury, an additional designation behind the main jury awards of Palme d'Or, Grand Prix and Jury Prize. The film received a standing ovation with reports that it lasted either 12 minutes or 15 minutes. Prior to its screening, Neon acquired North American distribution rights to the film, planning to release it later that year. Following the film's premiere, Lionsgate acquired the distribution rights for the UK and Ireland.

The film made its North American premiere at the 51st Telluride Film Festival. It also screened in the Centrepiece section of the 2024 Toronto International Film Festival, as well as in the Main Slate section of the 62nd New York Film Festival. Pyramide Distribution theatrically released the film in France on 18 September 2024, under the title Les Graines du figuier sauvage. Alamode Film distributed the film in Germany on 26 December 2024, under the title Die Saat des heiligen Feigenbaums.

It was featured in the Limelight section of the 54th International Film Festival Rotterdam to be screened in February 2025.

== Reception ==
=== Critical response ===
On the review aggregator website Rotten Tomatoes, 97% of 160 critics' reviews are positive, with an average rating of 8.3/10. The website's consensus reads: "A searing indictment of oppressive rule, whether it be of a nation or in a household, The Seed of the Sacred Fig functions both as compelling drama and powerful political statement." Metacritic, which uses a weighted average, assigned the film a score of 84 out of 100, based on 30 critics, indicating "universal acclaim". On AlloCiné, the film received an average rating of 4.4 out of 5, based on 39 reviews from French critics.

A 4-star-out-of-5 review by Peter Bradshaw in The Guardian concluded, "The film may not be perfect, but its courage – and relevance – are beyond doubt." Another positive review, by Peter Debruge for Variety, calling the film a "marathon domestic critique", placed it in a broader context by stating: "The situation Rasoulof depicts is hardly limited to Iran. There are echoes of Nazi Germany and modern-day China in the way average citizens submit, while the pressures to inform on one's neighbors recall pre-perestroika Soviet policies. Rasoulof's genius comes in focusing on how this dynamic plays out within a family, which makes it personal." Alissa Wilkinson, in The New York Times, insisted on the very real consequences of "breaking the fourth-wall" in the film.

The filmmakers Edward Berger, Tim Fehlbaum, Ciro Guerra, Don Hertzfeldt, Payal Kapadia, Joshua Oppenheimer, Laura Poitras, and Paul Schrader all ranked The Seed of the Sacred Fig as one of their favorite films of 2024.

On 22 August 2024, the film was announced as Germany's submission for the Academy Award for Best International Feature Film at the 97th Academy Awards, and made the December shortlist, before being nominated for the Academy Award on 23 January 2025.

=== Accolades ===
Accolades for The Seed of the Sacred Fig
Award	Date of ceremony	Category	Recipient(s)	Result	Ref.
Academy Awards	2 March 2025	Best International Feature Film	Germany	Nominated	
Alliance of Women Film Journalists	7 January 2025	Best International Film	The Seed of the Sacred Fig	Won	
Asian Film Awards	16 March 2025	Best Screenplay	Mohammad Rasoulof	Won	
Asia Pacific Screen Awards	30 November 2024	Best Performance	Soheila Golestani	Nominated	
Astra Film Awards	8 December 2024	Best International Feature	The Seed of the Sacred Fig	Nominated	
Austin Film Critics Association	6 January 2025	Best International Film	The Seed of the Sacred Fig	Won	
British Academy Film Awards	16 February 2025	Best Film Not in the English Language	Mohammad Rasoulof, Amin Sadraei	Nominated	
British Independent Film Awards	8 December 2024	Best International Independent Film	Mohammad Rasoulof, Rozita Hendijanian, Amin Sadraei, Jean-Christophe Simon and Mani Tilgner	Nominated	
Cinema for Peace Dove	17 February 2025	Most Valuable Film of The Year	Mohammad Rasoulof, Rozita Hendijanian, Amin Sadraei, Jean-Christophe Simon and Mani Tilgner	Won	
Cannes Film Festival	25 May 2024	Palme d'Or	Mohammad Rasoulof	Nominated	
Cannes Film Festival	25 May 2024	Special Award (Prix Spécial)	Mohammad Rasoulof	Won	
Cannes Film Festival	25 May 2024	FIPRESCI Prize	Mohammad Rasoulof	Won	
Cannes Film Festival	25 May 2024	Prize of the Ecumenical Jury	Mohammad Rasoulof	Won	
Cannes Film Festival	25 May 2024	François Chalais Prize	Mohammad Rasoulof	Won	
Cannes Film Festival	25 May 2024	Prix des Cinémas Art et Essai	Mohammad Rasoulof	Won	
César Awards	28 February 2025	Best Foreign Film	The Seed of the Sacred Fig	Nominated	
Chicago Film Critics Association	11 December 2024	Best Foreign Language Film	The Seed of the Sacred Fig	Nominated	
Chicago International Film Festival	27 October 2024	Gold Hugo	The Seed of the Sacred Fig	Nominated	
Chicago International Film Festival	27 October 2024	Silver Hugo – Best Screenplay	Mohammad Rasoulof	Won	
Critics' Choice Movie Awards	7 February 2025	Best Foreign Language Film	The Seed of the Sacred Fig	Nominated	
Dallas–Fort Worth Film Critics Association	18 December 2024	Best Foreign Language Film	The Seed of the Sacred Fig	Won	
Dallas–Fort Worth Film Critics Association	18 December 2024	Russell Smith Award	The Seed of the Sacred Fig	Won	
Dorian Awards	13 February 2025	Non-English Language Film of the Year	The Seed of the Sacred Fig	Nominated	
European Film Awards	7 December 2024	European Film	The Seed of the Sacred Fig	Nominated	
European Film Awards	7 December 2024	European Director	Mohammad Rasoulof	Nominated	
European Film Awards	7 December 2024	European Screenwriter	Mohammad Rasoulof	Nominated	
Florida Film Critics Circle	20 December 2024	Best International Film	The Seed of the Sacred Fig	Nominated	
Georgia Film Critics Association	7 January 2025	Best Original Screenplay	Mohammad Rasoulof	Nominated	
Georgia Film Critics Association	7 January 2025	Best International Film	The Seed of the Sacred Fig	Nominated	
German Film Awards	9 May 2025	Best Feature Film	Mohammad Rasoulof, Mani Tilgner, Rozita Hendijanian	Silver	
German Film Awards	9 May 2025	Best Director	Mohammad Rasoulof	Nominated	
German Film Awards	9 May 2025	Best Screenplay	Mohammad Rasoulof	Nominated	
German Film Awards	9 May 2025	Best Actor	Misagh Zare	Won	
German Film Awards	9 May 2025	Best Supporting Actress	Niousha Akhshi	Nominated	
German Film Awards	9 May 2025	Best Editor	Andrew Bird	Nominated	
Golden Globe Awards	5 January 2025	Best Motion Picture – Non-English Language	The Seed of the Sacred Fig	Nominated	
Golden Trailer Awards	29 May 2025	Best Foreign Thriller	Neon / GrandSon (for "Curse")	Nominated	
Golden Trailer Awards	29 May 2025	Best Digital – Drama	Lionsgate / Silk Factory (for "Bullets")	Nominated	
Hollywood Music in Media Awards	20 November 2024	Best Original Score – Independent Film (Foreign Language)	Karzan Mahmood	Nominated	
Houston Film Critics Society	14 January 2025	Best Foreign Language Feature	The Seed of the Sacred Fig	Nominated	
International Cinephile Society	9 February 2025	Best Picture	The Seed of the Sacred Fig	Nominated	
International Cinephile Society	9 February 2025	Best Original Screenplay	Mohammad Rasoulof	Nominated	
Iowa Film Critics Association	19 December 2024	Best Foreign Language Film	The Seed of the Sacred Fig	Won	
Los Angeles Film Critics Association	8 December 2024	Best Director	Mohammad Rasoulof	Won	
Los Angeles Film Critics Association	8 December 2024	Best Film Not in the English Language	The Seed of the Sacred Fig	Runner-up	
Lumière Awards	20 January 2025	Best International Co-Production	The Seed of the Sacred Fig	Won	
Middleburg Film Festival	October 2024	Audience Award – International Feature	The Seed of the Sacred Fig	Won	
NAACP Image Awards	22 February 2025	Outstanding International Motion Picture	The Seed of the Sacred Fig	Nominated	
National Board of Review	7 January 2025	Best International Film	The Seed of the Sacred Fig	Won	
National Society of Film Critics	4 January 2025	Best Foreign Language Film	The Seed of the Sacred Fig	Runner-up	
New York Film Critics Online	16 December 2024	Best International Feature	The Seed of the Sacred Fig	Nominated	
Online Film Critics Society	27 January 2025	Best Film Not in the English Language	The Seed of the Sacred Fig	Nominated	
Philadelphia Film Critics Circle	21 December 2024	Best Foreign Film	The Seed of the Sacred Fig	Runner-up	
Polish Film Awards	9 March 2026	Best European Film	Mohammad Rasoulof	Pending	
Satellite Awards	26 January 2025	Best Motion Picture – International	The Seed of the Sacred Fig	Nominated	
Satellite Awards	26 January 2025	Best Original Screenplay	Mohammad Rasoulof	Nominated	
San Diego Film Critics Society	9 December 2024	Best Foreign Language Film	The Seed of the Sacred Fig	Nominated	
San Francisco Bay Area Film Critics Circle	15 December 2024	Best International Feature Film	The Seed of the Sacred Fig	Won	
San Sebastián International Film Festival	28 September 2024	City of Donostia / San Sebastian Audience Award for Best European Film	The Seed of the Sacred Fig	Won	
Seattle Film Critics Society	16 December 2024	Best International Film	The Seed of the Sacred Fig	Nominated	
Southeastern Film Critics Association	16 December 2024	Best Foreign Language Film	The Seed of the Sacred Fig	Runner-up	
St. Louis Film Critics Association	15 December 2024	Best Film	The Seed of the Sacred Fig	Nominated	
St. Louis Film Critics Association	15 December 2024	Best Director	Mohammad Rasoulof	Runner-up	
St. Louis Film Critics Association	15 December 2024	Best Original Screenplay	Mohammad Rasoulof	Nominated	
St. Louis Film Critics Association	15 December 2024	Best International Feature Film	The Seed of the Sacred Fig	Won	
Sydney Film Festival	16 June 2024	GIO Audience Award for Best International Feature	The Seed of the Sacred Fig	Won	
Washington D.C. Area Film Critics Association	8 December 2024	Best International Film	The Seed of the Sacred Fig	Nominated	

== See also ==
- List of submissions to the 97th Academy Awards for Best International Feature Film
- List of German submissions for the Academy Award for Best International Feature Film
