= Soheila Golestani =

Iranian actress and film director

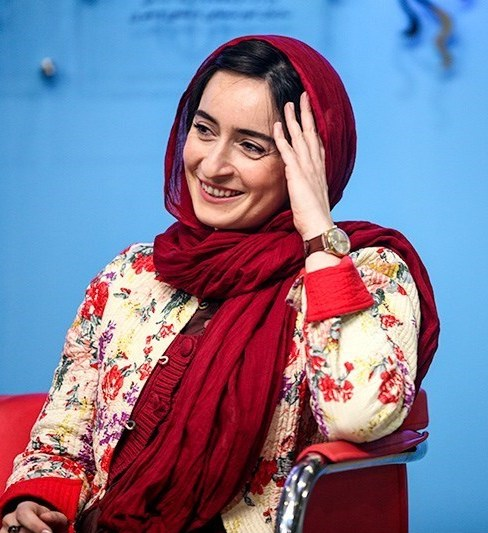
Soheila Golestani (2015)

Soheila Golestani (Persian: سهیلا گلستانی, born 8 December 1980 in Tehran) is an Iranian actress and film director. She became internationally known in 2024 for her leading role in the film The Seed of the Sacred Fig, directed by Mohammad Rasoulof.

== Life and career ==
Golestani was born in Tehran in 1980. She studied theatre with a focus on stage design. After her training, she worked as actress and was soon discovered for film, where she also worked as a stunt double. As film actress, she has worked with leading Iranian directors and in 2015, she directed her first own film titled Two.

Golestani gained notoriety on social media during the 2022 protests following the death of Mahsa Amini in police custody, when Golestani appeared in a video alongside other artists without the mandatory hijab. She was arrested, but later released on bail. Her participation in the protests led to increased attention from the Iranian authorities, which made their work more difficult.

In The Seed of the Sacred Fig, Golestani played Najmeh, the wife of Iman, a lawyer loyal to the regime, whom she initially supports faithfully, while her two daughters Rezvan (played by Mahsa Rostami) and Sana (Setareh Maleki) increasingly tend to oppose the theocratic regime in Tehran. Their generation rebels against the repression by the system, takes to the streets, where they are brutally beaten up, arrested, killed and even sentenced to death and executed. When the father becomes increasingly unable to cope with the loss of control, locks his daughters up and the situation escalates, Najmeh also turns her back on him.

The shooting of the film The Seed of the Sacred Fig took place under difficult conditions. The entire cast and crew were under constant pressure from the Iranian security forces. Director Mohammad Rasoulof, who was sentenced to eight years in prison by the Iranian authorities, fled the country at the beginning of 2024. The film was well received at the 2024 Cannes Film Festival, where it was also awarded a Special Jury Prize by President Greta Gerwig. Lead actress Soheila Golestani was unable to attend the premiere in Cannes as she was refused permission to leave the country.

The Seed of the Sacred Fig was nominated by Germany as the country of production for the 97th Academy Awards as Best Foreign Feature film.

== Critical reception ==
Reviews of Golestani's performance have been positive. In his review for Vanity Fair magazine, Richard Lawson called her acting "remarkable". Writing for Eye for Film, Amber Wilkinson credited her performance as “bringing home the shift in allegiance from her husband and the state to her daughters.” Writing for The Washington Post, Ty Burr remarked on her acting: "Golestani as Najmeh travels the broadest dramatic distance, from loving spouse to disillusioned realist; the role, the actress and the performance all call to mind Norma Aleandro’s towering work…"

== Awards ==
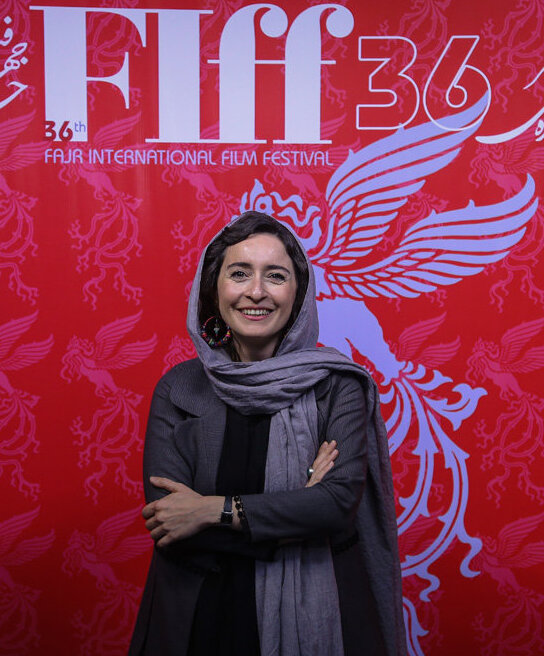
Soheila Golestani at the Fajr Film Festival 2013

- 2024: Best Performance nomination at the 17th Asia Pacific Screen Awards for her role in The Seed of the Sacred Fig
- 2013: Best Supporting Actress at the Fajr International Film Festival for her performance in Mieeman Darim

== Filmography ==
=== As actress ===
- 2024: The Seed of the Sacred Fig (Director: Mohammed Rasoulof)
- 2021: „Two Dogs“ (Director: Amir Azizi)
- 2021: „Khodkhasteh“ (Director: Alireza Bazrafshan)
- 2017: „Gargineh“ (Director: Abbas Nizamdoost)
- 2014: „Mihman Darim“
- 2014: „Bofalo“ (Director: Kaveh Sajjadi Hosseini)
- 2013: „Emruz“ (Director: Reza Mirkarimi)
- 2013: „Bidari baraye seh ruz“ (Director: Massoud Amini Tirani)
- 2013: „Shab biron“ (Director: Kaveh Sajjadi Hosseini)
- 2012: „Mieeman Darim“ (Director: Mohammad Mehdi Asgarpour)
- 2011: „vaziyat sefid“ (Director: Hamid Nematollah)
- 2008: „Bini“ (Director: Farzad Moatman)
- 2009: „Chehalsalegi“ (Director: Alireza Raisian)
- 2006: „Nas mal man, nas mal to“ (Director: Asghar Abdullahi)
- 2003: „Bagh belor“ (Director: Rambad Javan)
- 2003: „Kimiyaye manpar“ (Director: Mohammad Taqi Ranjbar)

=== As director ===
- 2015: Two
