= Setareh Maleki =

Iranian actress (born 1992)

- ستاره ملکی
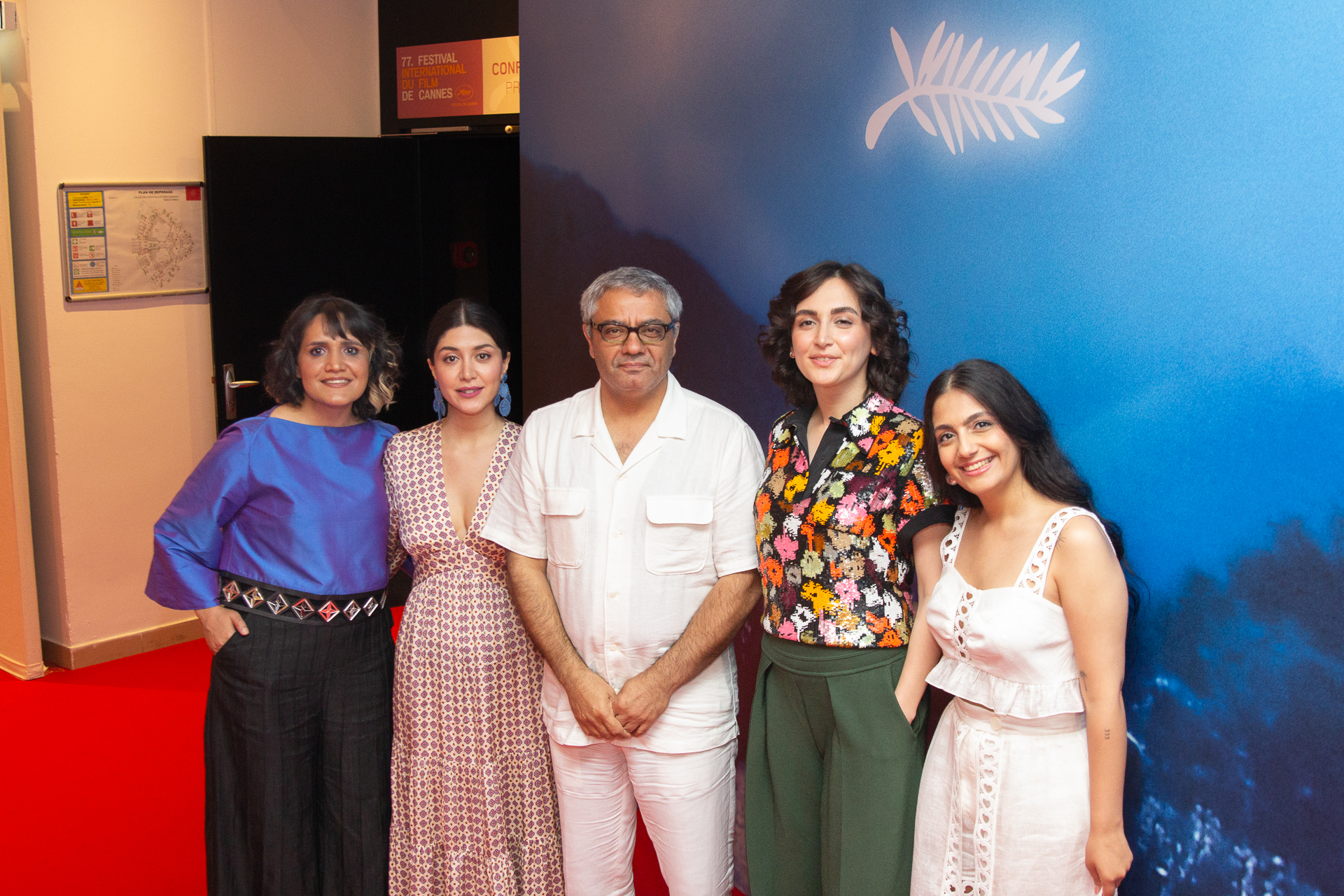
- Maleki (first from right) at the 2024 Cannes Film Festival
- Born: 12 October 1992 (age 34); Tehran, Iran
- Occupation: Actress
- Years active: 2012–present
- Known for: Leading actress in The Seed of the Sacred Fig

Setareh Maleki (Persian: ستاره ملکی; born October 12, 1992) is an Iranian actress. She is best known for her role as Sana in the Academy Award-nominated drama film The Seed of the Sacred Fig (2024), directed by Mohammad Rasoulof.

Shortly after finishing filming, Rasoulof, as well as the three actresses Niousha Akhshi, Mahsa Rostami and Setareh Maleki, had to flee Iran.

== Life and career ==
Setareh Maleki was born on 12 October, 1992, in Tehran, Iran.

In 2024, Maleki gained international recognition for her performance as Sana, the younger daughter of an Islamic Revolutionary Court judge, in Mohammad Rasoulof's film The Seed of the Sacred Fig. The film depicts a family's growing fear and internal conflict amid protests following the death of Mahsa Amini. Maleki’s portrayal received critical acclaim, contributing to the film's success at the 2024 Cannes Film Festival, where it won the Jury Prize. The film was selected the same year as Germany's submission for Best International Feature Film at the 97th Academy Awards.

The film was secretly shot in early 2024 in Iran, with director Rasoulof having to hide in the trunk of a car and communicating with the actors only through intermediaries. In an interview, Maleki commented on the filming: “We, in Iran, are used to living underground — used to being ourselves in hidden spaces. And there, we were truly ourselves, with our own beliefs."

== Exile in Germany ==
Following the last phases of filming, Maleki, along with director Rasoulof and fellow actresses Niousha Akhshi and Mahsa Rostami left Iran due to fears of government reprisals. Since 2024, she has been based in Berlin, Germany, where she has received support and artistic residencies. She has continued acting, for example in the short film Bitter Chocolate and participates in events in support of Iranian women’s rights.

== Critical reception ==
Critical reception of Maleki's acting has mainly centered on her role as Sana in The Seed of the Sacred Fig. Thus, Justin Chang of NPR wrote that the actors were "uniformly superb" and remarked "the nuanced sibling dynamic between Mahsa Rostami, as the sensitive, thoughtful older sister, and Setareh Maleki, as the slyer, more mischievous younger one." Writing for The Jerusalem Post after the film's release in Israel in March 2025, Hannah Brown noted the "excellent" performance of the actresses.

In his review for FilmBook, Thomas Duffy wrote: "Maleki will also tear the viewer’s heart out as she tries to save her mom and sister from a potentially dire fate." Vogue magazine's Douglas Greenwood called her one of the “8 Rising Stars to Know After the 2024 Cannes Film Festival”.

== Filmography ==
=== Film ===
Year	Title	Role	Director	Notes	Ref(s)
2013	Trapped	Mona	Parviz Shahbazi		
2023	Cafe	Berkeh	Navid Mihandoost		
2024	The Seed of the Sacred Fig	Sana	Mohammad Rasoulof		
2024	Bitter Chocolate	Yasi	Sahar Sotoodeh	Short film	

=== Web ===
Year	Title	Role	Director	Platform	Notes	Ref(s)
2021	Happiness	Ferial	Pouria Takavar	YouTube	Main role; 12 episodes	

== See also ==
- Cinema of Iran
- Soheila Golestani
