= Mahsa Rostami =

Iranian actress, born 1992

- مهسا رستمی
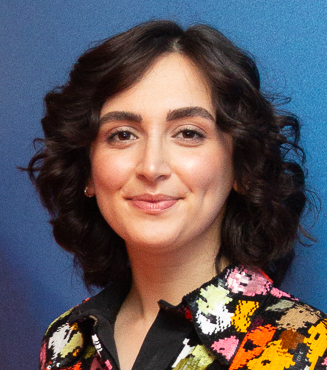
- Mahsa Rostami at 2024 Cannes Film Festival
- Born: 1992 (age 33–34)
- Citizenship: Iran
- Occupation: Actress
- Known for: Leading actress in The Seed of the Sacred Fig

Mahsa Rostami (Persian: مهسا رستمی; born 1992) is an Iranian actress best known for her role as leading actress in the 2024 feature film The Seed of the Sacred Fig, directed by Mohammad Rasoulof. The film was presented at the Cannes International Film Festival in May 2024 and has since been awarded numerous recognitions and accolades.

Shortly after finishing filming, Rasoulof as well as the three actresses Niousha Akhshi, Mahsa Rostami and Setareh Maleki had to flee Iran.

== Life and career ==
Rostami has been described as "a courageous, socially-minded and committed Iranian actress." In Iran, she was active in short films and underground theatre. A participant in Iran's Woman, Life, Freedom protests in 2022, where she was beaten by Revolutionary Guard militias, she chose to turn down official, state-controlled stage and film offers and refused to accept enforced dress codes. To support herself, she worked in an advertising agency, but kept her headscarf in her handbag, even though she was afraid of the consequences. Her role as Rezvan in The Seed of the Sacred Fig was her first major appearance in a feature film.

In 2024, Rostami gained international recognition for her performance as Rezvan, the elder daughter of an Islamic Revolutionary Court judge, in Mohammad Rasoulof's film The Seed of the Sacred Fig. The film depicts a family's growing fear and internal conflict amid protests following the death of Mahsa Amini. Rostami’s portrayal received critical acclaim, contributing to the film's success at the 2024 Cannes Film Festival, where it won the Jury Prize. The film was selected the same year as Germany's submission for Best International Feature Film at the 97th Academy Awards.

The film was secretly shot in early 2024 in Iran, with director Rasoulof having to hide in the trunk of a car and communicating with the actors only through intermediaries. Accepting the risk to appear without headscarves, Rostami said: "We had to appear in front of the camera with fear, we always feared that the camera could be stopped." Thanks to Rasoulof's film, she finally had the opportunity to voice her frustrations; he gave her the chance to express her "last cry" before leaving the country. As soon as filming was finished, the film was scheduled for the Cannes festival, and the news of the clandestine shooting became known. Rostami said she could have stayed in Iran, like the actors Missagh Zareh and Soheila Golestani, who were featured as her character's parents. But she decided to leave without saying goodbye to her family and friends.

== Exile in Germany ==
Following the last phases of filming, Rostami, along with director Rasoulof and fellow actresses Niousha Akhshi and Setareh Maleki left Iran due to fears of government reprisals. Since 2024, she has been based in Berlin, Germany, where she has received support and artistic residencies. She continues to promote the film and participates in events in support of Iranian women’s rights.

== Critical reception ==
Critical reception of Rostami's acting has mainly centered on her role as Razvan in The Seed of the Sacred Fig. Thus, Justin Chang of NPR wrote that the actors were "uniformly superb" and remarked "the nuanced sibling dynamic between Mahsa Rostami, as the sensitive, thoughtful older sister, and Setareh Maleki, as the slyer, more mischievous younger one."

Writing for The Jerusalem Post after the film's release in Israel in March 2025, Hannah Brown noted the "excellent" performance of the actresses. Further, she called Rostami as Rezvan "especially good, and her face and blunt haircut make her resemble an ancient statue." In his review for FilmBook Thomas Duffy called Rostami "a revelation". He further wrote: "She presents the essence of the movie’s themes as her character struggles with the morality of things that are in plain view."

In an interview with Vulture magazine, Rasoulof called Rostami "an amazing choice" for the role of Rezvan. Initially, she didn't know who would be the director. After reading the script without ever being able to keep it for herself for security reasons, she was moved and afraid at the same time, but finally accepted the role. In an interview with IndieWire magazine, Rostami said that the sense of secrecy, stemming from the imposed distance between the director and the actors, made her feel as if they were involved in something forbidden. This atmosphere was, however, perfectly suited to the film's narrative, as she added.

== See also ==
- Cinema of Iran
