= The Town (2022 film) =

- Film poster
- Directed by: Ali Hazrati
- Written by: Ali Hazrati
- Produced by: Ali Sartipi
- Starring: Saed Soheili; Mahtab Servati; Kazem Sayahi
- Cinematography: Alireza Barazandeh
- Edited by: Zhilla Ipackchi
- Music by: Shora Karimi
- Release date: February 1, 2022 (FIFF)
- Country: Iran
- Language: Persian

The Town (Persian: شهرک, romanized: 'Shahrak') is a 2022 Iranian drama film directed by Ali Hazrati and written by Ali Hazrati. The film screened for the first time at the 40th Fajr Film Festival and received 3 nominations.

== Premise ==
Navid Falahati (Saed Soheili) is a young man interested in acting. He is accepted in the testing of a big production movie and in order to join this project and achieve his long-held dream of becoming an actor, he has to accept the special conditions and mental training of the actors in an isolated town.

== Cast ==
- Saed Soheili as Navid
- Mahtab Servati as Fereshteh
- Kazem Sayahi as The Assistant Director
- Roya Javidnia
- Homayoun Ershadi
- Shahrokh Forootanian
- Morteza Zarrabi
- Saghi Hajipour as Homa

== Reception ==
=== Accolades ===
Year	Award	Category	Recipient	Result	Ref.
2022	Fajr Film Festival	Best Special Effects	Arash Aghabeig	Nominated	
2022	Fajr Film Festival	Best Editor	Zhila Ipkechi	Nominated	
2022	Fajr Film Festival	Best Cinematography	Alireza Barazandeh	Nominated	
