= The Twilight =

- Directed by: Mohammad Rasoulof
- Screenplay by: Mohammad Rasoulof
- Produced by: Houshang Nourollahi; Mohammad Rasoulof
- Starring: Fatemeh Bijan; Zalkla Bijan; Ali Reza Mahdaviyan; Ali Reza Shalikaran
- Cinematography: Reza Jalali
- Edited by: Mitra Karagah
- Music by: Sohrab Mohammadi
- Release date: 2002
- Running time: 83 minutes
- Country: Iran
- Language: Persian

The Twilight (Persian: گاگومان Gagooman) is a 2002 Iranian film directed by Mohammad Rasoulof in his feature debut "Based on a true story , the film chronicles how a long-term, notorious prisoner seeks to become 'normalized ' and socially included through marriage" according to Janne Bjerre Christensen.

== Cast ==
- Fatemeh Bijan
- Zalkla Bijan
- Ali Reza Mahdaviyan
- Ali Reza Shalikaran
