= Andrew Bird (film editor) =

British-born film editor

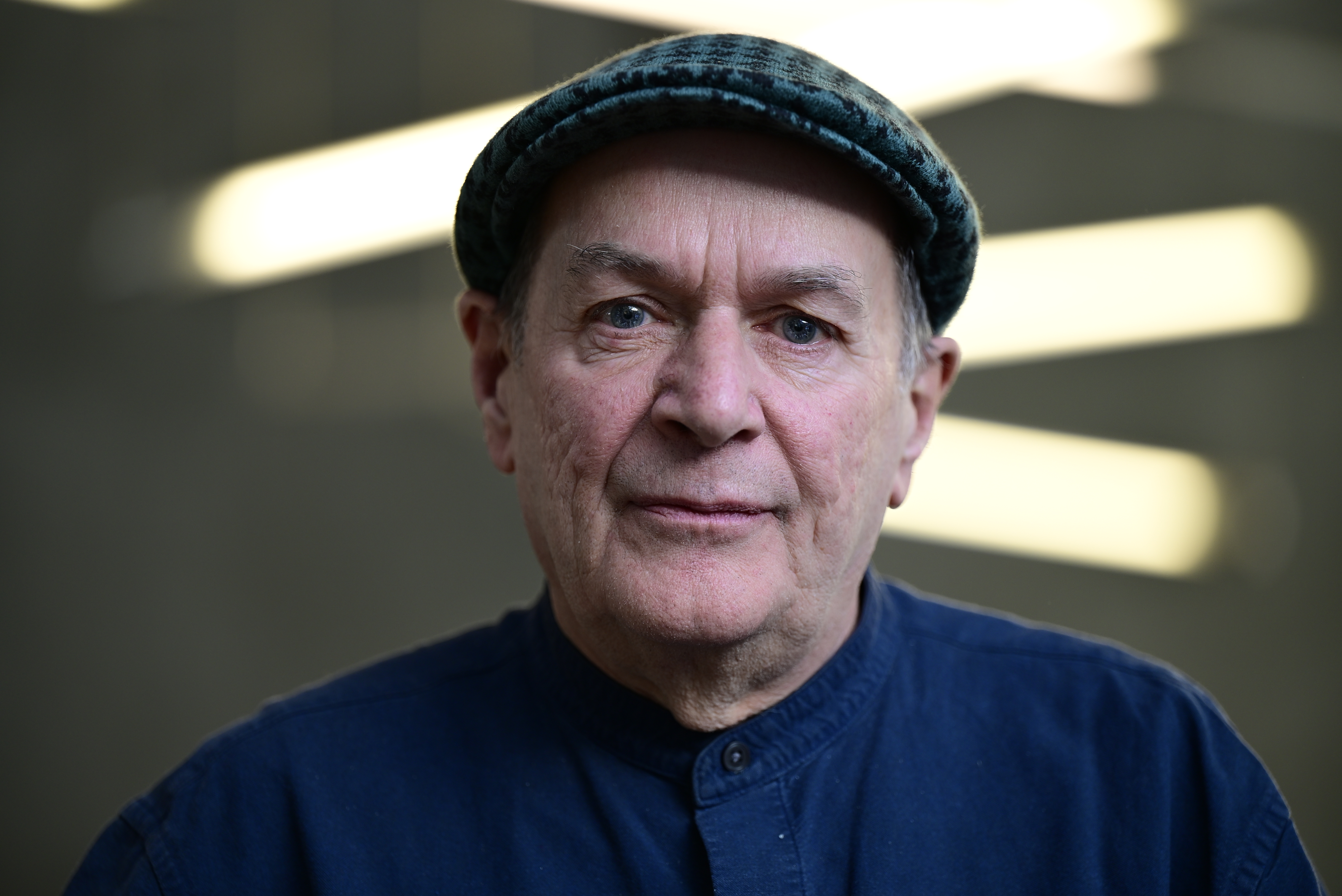
- Bird in 2025
- Born: London, England, U.K.
- Citizenship: United Kingdom; Germany
- Occupation: Film editor

Andrew Bird is a British-born film editor. He has worked mostly in the German cinema. He has edited multiple films including The Seed of the Sacred Fig, The Edge of Heaven, Soul Kitchen and Head-On.

== Awards and nominations ==
German Film Awards:

- 2021, Best Editing, A Symphony of Noise (nominated)
- 2017, Best Editing, Goodbye Berlin (nominated)
- 2008, Best Editing, The Edge of Heaven Winner (won)
