= 2022 Iranian food protests =

Ongoing campaign of protests

2022 Iran Regime Protests
- Part of 2021–2022 Iranian protests
- Date: 6 May 2022 – 15 September 2022 (4 months, 1 week and 2 days)
- Location: Iran
- Caused by: Inflation in commodities
- Goals: End of price hikes; Restoration of subsidies on imported wheat; Deposition of President Ebrahim Raisi; Deposition of Supreme Leader Ali Khamenei
- Methods: Demonstrations, food riot
- Result: Protests spilled over into the larger Mahsa Amini protests

Parties
Iranian demonstrators	Government of Iran; Police Command

Lead figures
Non-centralized leadership	Ebrahim Raisi (President of Iran); (Iran) Sadeq Khalilian (Governor-general of Khuzestan); Hossein Ashtari (Chief Commander of the Police Command of the Islamic Republic of Iran)

In May 2022, ongoing protests in Iran escalated into nationwide civil unrest as a result of government price hikes on staple foods including bread and pasta. The protests were part of a countrywide wave of protests beginning in July 2021. Protests were initially concentrated in the drought-stricken province of Khuzestan, but rapidly spread nationwide. Authorities responded by declaring riot control action and blocking internet access.

Prior to the start of the demonstrations, preceding and during International Workers' Day on 1 May, Iran preemptively detained 38 teachers in order to stymie planned nationwide protests during National Teachers' Day on 2 May. Workers' protests had increased over the past year as the result of a deterioration in living conditions caused by the re-imposition of US sanctions against Iran during the administration of Donald Trump and the economic effects of the COVID-19 pandemic. After the Iranian government ended subsidies for imported wheat, the price of flour soared by around 500%, exacerbating current inflation, which hovered around 50%.

The protests, beginning on 6 May in Khuzestan, were initially associated with the rising cost of living. However, they rapidly escalated into anti-Mullah demonstrations. Ranchers in at least 10 cities allegedly staged demonstrations at offices of the Iranian Agricultural Ministry, with pensioners participating in similar demonstrations. Large scale demonstrations reportedly broke out in the city of Dezful, and reportedly spread into the cities of Khafajia, Hawizeh, and Shiraz.

== Background ==
In the summer of 2021, widespread demonstrations in Khuzestan and elsewhere in Southern Iran broke out as a result of government rationing of water. The suppression of the demonstrations was met with condemnation from international human rights organizations including Amnesty International, who criticized the deployment of "unlawful force". The demonstrations were accompanied by an industrial strike composed of petrochemical workers in Bushehr province. Labor actions continued to increase over the following year and into 2022, exacerbated by increasing consumer prices and a weakening rial. Demonstrations across Khuzestan and various cities occurred in the week following a building collapse in Abadan, which had combined with several weeks of the ongoing food protests.

=== Price hikes ===
On 1 May 2022, the Iranian government abruptly terminated subsidy support for several imported staple products. Iranian president Ebrahim Raisi explained his decision to terminate the price stability measures of his predecessor, Hassan Rouhani, by arguing that such measures were inefficient and led to corruption. The Central Bank of the Islamic Republic of Iran began direct payments in the form of cash subsidies to Iran's public instead, with the government deploying an electronic coupon system as a form of price control to prevent price gouging in place of the import subsidies.

Despite Raisi promising that "prices on wheat, medicine, and petrol will not increase in any circumstances", the price of some food products rose by over 300%. Worsened by increasing prices of grain caused by the 2022 Russian Invasion of Ukraine, the price of flour rose to Rls.160,000 from the pre-discontinuation Rls.27,000 average. From inflation going up in the last few years, this is causing the poverty line rate to increase.

== Street protests ==
=== Khuzestan ===
The demonstrations were initially concentrated in the Khuzestan province, beginning on 6 May. Iranian security forces allegedly used live ammunition to disperse protestors in the Abuzar area, and looting of grain stores occurred in the city of Izeh. State news agency IRNA claimed that demonstrators had looted several stores in the "past few days" in Izeh. In several videos posted to social media, riot police reportedly used tear gas and live ammunition on many occasions. As protests spread nationwide on the night of 12 May, Iranian forces arrested 15 demonstrators in the Khuzestani city of Dezful. Protestors in the cities of Ahwaz, and Dezful chanted slogans calling for the "death to the dictator". IRNA claimed that demonstrators threw stones at police and firefighters, causing the injury of a firefighter. The People's Mojahedin Organization of Iran claimed that Iranian security forces used live ammunition against demonstrators in the city of Andimeshk. One person was killed during clashes on May 12.

=== Elsewhere in Iran ===
Demonstrations spread nationwide on the night of 12 May. Protests in the cities of Shahr-e Kord in Chaharmahal and Bakhtiari province grew to 200 persons on the night of 12 May, with social media reports indicating that unrest had spread further to the cities of Ardabil, Rasht, and Iranshahr. By 24 May, protests had spread to 40 cities and towns across Iran.
