= A Man of Integrity =

2017 film by Mohammad Rasoulof

- Film poster
- Persian: لِرد
- Directed by: Mohammad Rasoulof
- Written by: Mohammad Rasoulof
- Produced by: Mohammad Rasoulof
- Starring: Reza Akhlaghirad; Soudabeh Beizaee; Nasim Adabi
- Release date: 19 May 2017 (Cannes)
- Running time: 120 minutes
- Country: Iran
- Language: Persian
- Box office: $919,572

A Man of Integrity (Persian: لِرد, romanized: Lerd) is a 2017 Iranian drama film directed by Mohammad Rasoulof. It was screened in the Un Certain Regard section at the 2017 Cannes Film Festival where it won the main prize.

== Reception ==
On review aggregator Rotten Tomatoes, the film holds an approval rating of 100% based on 19 reviews, with an average rating of 7.2/10. On Metacritic, the film has a weighted average score of 78 out of 100, based on 10 critics, indicating "generally favorable reviews".
