= Iron Island (film) =

- Directed by: Mohammad Rasoulof
- Written by: Mohammad Rasoulof
- Produced by: Mohammad Rasoulof, Abolhassan Davoodi
- Release date: 2005
- Running time: 90 minutes
- Country: Iran
- Language: Persian

Iron Island (Persian: جزیره آهنی, Jazire-ye Ahani) is a 2005 Iranian drama film written and directed by Mohammad Rasoulof. It won the Golden Peacock (Best Film) at the 36th International Film Festival of India.

== Synopsis ==
Captain Nemat runs a tight ship. Nemat is a father to the scores of poor, homeless, and uneducated families who live on a tanker, anchored offshore.

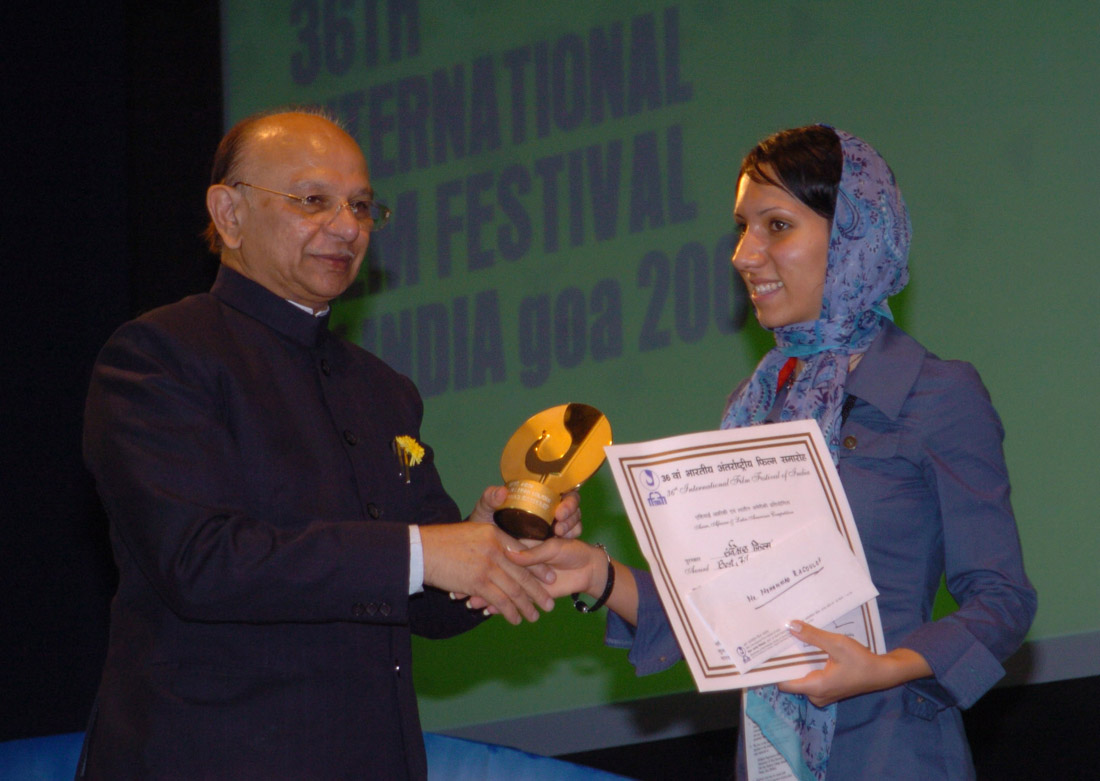
Film winning Golden Peacock Award in IFFI (2010)

== Cast ==
- Ali Nassirian ... Captain Nemat
- Hossein Farzi-Zadeh ... Ahmad
- Neda Pakdaman ... Golpar Salehi

== Reception ==
On the review aggregator website Rotten Tomatoes, 97% of 31 critics' reviews are positive, with an average rating of 7.4/10. The website's consensus reads: "A visually creative yet grounded film from Iran, Iron Island is a political allegory that packs a punch" Metacritic, which uses a weighted average, assigned the film a score of 74 out of 100, based on 16 critics, indicating "generally favorable" reviews.
