= In Search of Peace =

- Genre: Drama
- Written by: Hamid Taheri, Sadegh Khoshhal
- Directed by: Saeed Soltani
- Starring: Mehdi Hashemi; Pejman Bazeghi; Dariush Farhang; Hadis Mir-Amini; Mani Heidari; Kamand Amirsoleimani; Jamshid Mashayekhi
- Music by: Behzad Abdi
- Country of origin: Iran
- Original language: Persian

Production
- Producer: Ali Ashtianipoor
- Cinematography: Naser Mahmoud Kalayeh Nasser beikzade Seyed meysam hosseini
- Running time: 50 minutes 44 episodes
- Production company: IRIB TV5

Original release
- Release: 2017

In Search of Peace (Persian: در جستجوی آرامش; Dar Jostejoye Aramesh) is a 2017 Iranian TV series Drama directed by Saeed Soltani.

The series has 44 episodes, originally broadcast on the IRIB TV5, a national Iranian television channel.

== Plot ==
Dr. Behrouz Amini is a Ph.D. scientist and research scientist in Iran. He has an exemplary family and succeeded in his career, and after 20 years of continuous effort, he has been able to produce a cancer-free drug that is not alike in the direction of national production and knowledge. After the production of medicine, the medical community sets up a celebration for Behrouz Amini, and his name and his company will be recited throughout the world of medical medicine, but one incident will put Dr. Amini's equations in disrepute and put his jealousy at risk.

== Cast ==
- Mehdi Hashemi
- Pejman Bazeghi
- Dariush Farhang
- Hadis Mir-Amini
- Mani Heidari
- Kamand Amirsoleimani
- Jamshid Mashayekhi
- Ata Omrani
- Zahra Saeedi
- Afsaneh Naseri
- Parviz Fallahipour
- Mahtab Servati
