= Manuscripts Don't Burn =

2013 film

- Directed by: Mohammad Rasoulof
- Written by: Mohammad Rasoulof
- Release date: 24 May 2013 (Cannes)
- Running time: 125 minutes
- Country: Iran
- Language: Persian

Manuscripts Don't Burn (Persian: دست‌نوشته‌ها نمی‌سوزند, translit. Dast-Neveshtehaa Nemisoozand) is a 2013 Iranian drama film written and directed by Mohammad Rasoulof, about a failed attempt to kill a busload of Iranian writers in 1996. It was screened in the Un Certain Regard section at the 2013 Cannes Film Festival, where it won the FIPRESCI Prize. It was screened in the Contemporary World Cinema section at the 2013 Toronto International Film Festival.

== Reception ==
On review aggregator Rotten Tomatoes, the film holds an approval rating of 93% based on 27 reviews, with an average rating of 7.8/10. The website consensus reads: "Brave, challenging, and brimming with rage, Manuscripts Don't Burn is a political statement as much as it is a gripping thriller." On Metacritic, the film has a weighted average score of 88 out of 100, based on 10 critics, indicating "universal acclaim".
