= Abadan building collapse =

2022 building collapse in Abadan, Iran

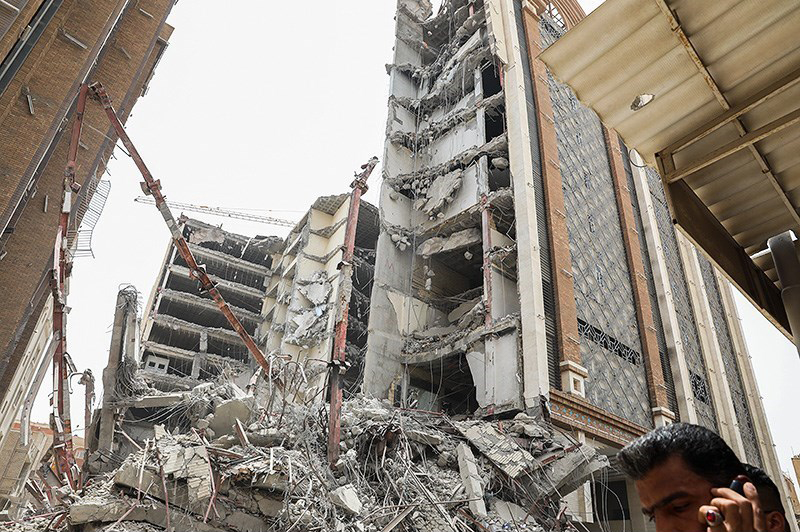
- Site of the collapsed Metropol building on 23 May 2022
- Date: 23 May 2022
- Location: Abadan, Iran; 30.333223°N 48.286194°E
- Type: Building collapse
- Deaths: 41
- Injuries: 37

On 23 May 2022, the Metropol building, a ten-story residential and commercial building in Abadan, Iran, collapsed while under construction. As of 6 June 2022, at least 41 people had died and 37 others were injured in the incident, according to Iranian state media. In the following weeks, demonstrations related to the incident have occurred in the Khuzestan province, where Abadan is located, and other parts of Iran. According to The Guardian, the collapse "dredged up memories of past national disasters and shone a spotlight on shoddy construction practices, government corruption and negligence in Iran".

== Incident ==
The Metropol building was an unfinished ten-story residential and commercial building in the Iranian city of Abadan in the province of Khuzestan. Although the building was legally allowed to have only six stories, four additional floors had been added during construction. On 23 May 2022, the building collapsed. Later that day Mehr News Agency reported that more than 80 people were trapped under the building's rubble.

Iranian state media reported the following day that at least eleven people had been killed in the collapse. It was also reported that, through the following day, an investigation of the incident was ordered by Khuzestan's judiciary head, and ten people had been detained, including the owner of the building, the contractor who had constructed it, and the mayor of Abadan. By 4 June, they had announced that they had made a total of thirteen arrests in connection to the incident.

By 31 May, the state-run Islamic Republic News Agency (IRNA) reported that a total of 34 people had been killed in the incident and that four people were still missing. Authorities announced by 1 June that the death toll had risen to 37 and that 37 people had been injured in the incident. By the following week, the government reported a death toll of 41.

== Aftermath ==
The following month, The Guardian reported that the collapse "dredged up memories of past national disasters and shone a spotlight on shoddy construction practices, government corruption and negligence in Iran". A Washington Post reporter wrote that the incident was the "most damaging" to the reputation of Iranian president Ebrahim Raisi compared to other recent cases of alleged government corruption.

=== Demonstrations ===
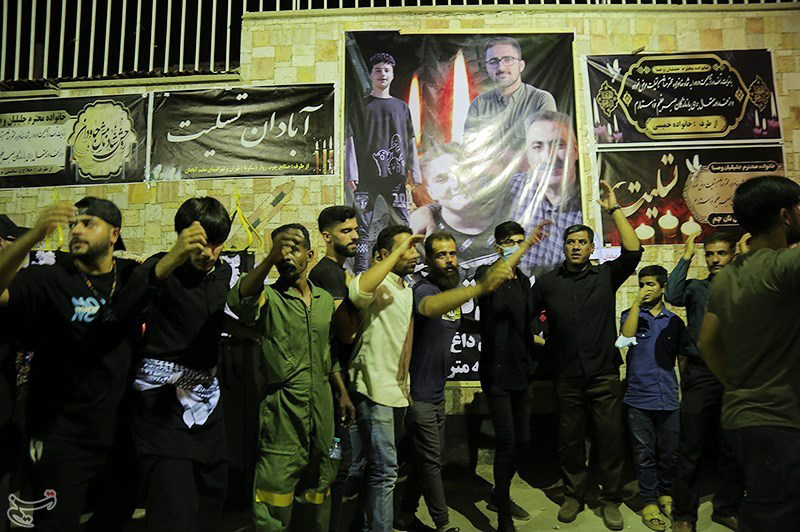
Mourners at the home of a victim on 31 May 2022

Demonstrations across Khuzestan province and various cities throughout Iran occurred in the week following the building collapse, which had combined with several weeks of ongoing demonstrations over rising food costs. BBC News and Reuters news agency have reported that protestors have blamed the incident on government negligence and graft and chanted slogans targeted at government officials including Supreme Leader Ayatollah Ali Khamenei. In contrast, Iranian authorities have blamed the collapse on "local corruption and lax safety standards."

According to Reuters, coverage of the incident by Iranian state media mainly comprised "religious mourning and funeral processions." Ayatollah Khamenei released a statement expressing condolence about the incident three days later. The governor of Abadan spoke on state television to caution people to only follow official media coverage and avoid "rumours" discussed on social media. The BBC and Associated Press reported on unverified internet videos which showed a confrontation between demonstrators and an emissary sent by Khamenei to the site of the collapse on 30 May, which led to clashes with riot police. In a televised address on 4 June, Khamenei accused "enemies" of Iran of causing unrest in order to overthrow the state. He also accused the United States and its allies of conducting a "psychological war" against Iran, after the countries had accused Iran of piracy for its seizure of two Greek oil tankers. The United States had seized Iranian oil from a Greek tanker earlier on 27 May.

Iranian filmmakers Mohammad Rasoulof and Mostafa Al-Ahmad were detained on 8 July over an appeal on social media that called on security forces to lay down their weapons and not suppress protests that occurred following the building collapse. Later that month, filmmaker Jafar Panahi was detained and ordered to serve a six-year prison sentence, originally given in 2010, after he inquired prosecutors about Rasoulof's arrest. Rasoulof and Panahi were released from prison in February 2023.
