= The White Meadows =

- Directed by: Mohammad Rasoulof
- Written by: Mohammad Rasoulof
- Produced by: Mohammad Rasoulof
- Starring: Hassan Pourshirazi; Mohammad Shirvani
- Cinematography: Ebrahim Ghafori
- Edited by: Jafar Panahi
- Music by: Mohammad Reza Darvishi
- Release date: September 19, 2009 (San Sebastián)
- Running time: 93 minutes
- Country: Iran
- Languages: Persian, with subtitles in English

The White Meadows (Persian: کشتزارهای سپید, romanized: Keshtzarhaye sepid) is a 2009 Iranian film written, directed and produced by Mohammad Rasoulof. The film was edited by Iranian filmmaker Jafar Panahi and stars Hassan Pourshirazi as Rahmat. Lake Urmia, which is affected by falling water level and increasing salinity, was the filming location for the fictional setting of a salt-encrusted land.

== Cast ==
- Hasan Pourshirazi - Rahmat
- Younes Ghazali - Nasim
- Mohammad Rabbani - Guardman

== Global Lens 2011 Series ==
The film is featured in the Global Lens 2011 film series, sponsored by The Global Film Initiative.

== Controversy ==
In December 2010, Mohammad Rasoulof, along with his editor - Iranian director Jafar Panahi - were sentenced to six years in prison for film-related activities. Since then, many notable people in the film industry, including Steven Spielberg, Martin Scorsese, and Oliver Stone, have expressed solidarity with Rasoulof and Panahi.

In January 2011, the film foundation and human rights organization Cine Foundation International launched a video protest mechanism called WHITE MEADOWS (named for the Mohammad Rasoulof film), developed by Ericson deJesus (of Yahoo! and frog design). The video mechanism "allow(s) anyone in the world to record a short video statement about Panahi and Rasoulof."

In October 2011, "[t]he Appeals Court of Tehran Province has issued its rulings for Jafar Panahi and Mohammad Rasoulof who were sentenced to prison terms and bans by the lower court. Jafar Panahi and Mohammad Rasoulof are two Iranian filmmakers and directors charged with acting against national security and propaganda against the regime." "Following the defendants’ objections and requests for appeal, their cases were reviewed by the 54th branch of the Appeals Court in Tehran Province. The Appeals Court then issued its final rulings upholding the verdict against Jafar Panahi but reducing Mohammad Rasoulof's prison sentence to one year."

== Reception ==
=== Critical response ===
On review aggregator Rotten Tomatoes, the film holds an approval rating of 80% based on 5 reviews, with an average rating of 8.8/10.

=== Awards ===
- Dubai International Film Festival - Muhr AsiaAfrica Award for Best Actor (Hassan Pourshirazi)
- Dubai International Film Festival - AsiaAfrica Special Jury Prize for Best Feature
- San Sebastián International Film Festival - Golden Seashell Award (Nominated)
- Denver Film Festival - Krzysztof Kieslowski Award for Best Feature Film
- Tribeca Film Festival - Narrative Features Competition
