= Blind Ambition (2022 film) =

Blind Ambition is a 2022 documentary based on the lives of four people from Zimbabwe that take part in the World Blind Wine Tasting Championships in France.

== Reception ==
On Rotten Tomatoes the film has an approval rating of 100% based on 32 reviews.

Peter Bradshaw of The Guardian wrote that "It’s impossible not to smile along with this feelgood documentary about four Zimbabwean refugees in South Africa who got jobs in restaurants, discovered in themselves a brilliant talent for wine-tasting and in 2017 were brought together as the exiled team Zimbabwe for the World Blind Wine Tasting Championships in France". A critic from Daily Express wrote that "The subject matter initially suggests a kind of Cool Runnings with plonk - but Blind Ambition soon builds into a full-bodied feel-good film".

Except a mixed review at Roger Moore's Movie Nation and another at the BFI website, other reviews were generally also very positive.
