= There Is No Evil =

2020 film

- Film poster
- Directed by: Mohammad Rasoulof
- Written by: Mohammad Rasoulof
- Produced by: Mohammad Rasoulof; Kaveh Farnam; Farzad Pak; Christoph Thoke
- Starring: Ehsan Mirhosseini; Kaveh Ahangar; Mohammad Valizadegan; Mohammad Seddighimehr
- Cinematography: Ashkan Ashkani
- Edited by: Mohammadreza Muini; Meysam Muini
- Music by: Amir Molookpour
- Release date: 28 February 2020 (Berlinale)
- Running time: 150 minutes
- Countries: Germany; Czech Republic; Iran
- Language: Persian
- Box office: $824,066

There Is No Evil (Persian: شیطان وجود ندارد, romanized: Sheytân vojūd nadârad, lit. 'Shaitan Doesn't Exist') is a 2020 Persian-language drama film written and directed by Mohammad Rasoulof. Banned in Iran, the film relates four stories concerning the death penalty in Iran. It had its world premiere at the 70th Berlin International Film Festival, where it won the Golden Bear.

== Plot ==
The film is divided into four unrelated episodes.

Episode I: "There Is No Evil"

A man named Heshmat goes about his day—he helps his neighbors rescue their cat, picks up his wife and daughter from work and school, and takes them to see his mother-in-law. He takes them home, where he helps his wife put highlights in her hair in anticipation of a wedding they plan to attend the next day. He wakes early in the morning and drives to work with visible reluctance, where he presses a button that hangs several condemned prisoners.

Episode II: "She Said: 'You Can Do It'"

Pouya, a soldier, is assigned to kill a man and tries to get transferred to a different branch through his brother's contacts with the hour he has left. He and his bunkmates debate the moral issues arising during military service, where he points out that he cannot obtain a passport without completing mandatory conscription and therefore cannot legally leave the country. One man points out that, if he wants to leave the country with his girlfriend Tahmineh like he plans, he has to complete his task, while another suggests he stay in the system so he can become a lawmaker and influence the country. Tahmineh presses him over the phone to go through with it.

Another soldier volunteers to take Pouya's place in exchange for fifty million toman to support his sick sister. Their bunkmate argues that the payment won't stop the execution and Pouya is still as culpable, promising to report him if he makes the deal. Out of time, Pouya steals the accompanying soldier's rifle while walking the prisoner to execution and restrains several soldiers while escaping. He meets up with Tahmineh and they drive off happily after he throws the rifle away.

Episode III: "Birthday"

Javad, a young man who is almost finished with his service, plans to propose to his girlfriend Nana at her birthday party. When he arrives, he learns that her family friend and political activist, Keyvan, recently died. Javad is opposed to Keyvan's ideals and is more concerned with if Nana had previous relations with him, while he and her mother discuss the ethics behind refusing certain military orders.

Javad sees a picture of Keyvan and realizes that he executed him for a few days off to see Nana on her birthday. Devastated, he admits this to Nana and she considers attacking him with a rock, but instead asks that he not tell her family. Her father memorializes Keyvan during her birthday dinner and she cries while her family sings to her. Javad affirms his love for her the next day and asks her to forget about it, but she leaves him.

Episode IV: "Kiss Me"

University student Darya visits her aunt and uncle, Zaman and Bahram, at their country home. Unbeknownst to her, Bahram is terminally ill. She frequently inquires as to why he did not pursue a more lucrative career in medicine alongside her father, Mansour, but he avoids the question. He and Darya get in a debate about killing a fox to protect his chickens, where she states she would avoid doing so.

Zaman eventually tells Darya that Bahram is her real father, something that he has been working up the courage to tell her. While Darya packs to leave, they argue and it is revealed that he had to disband his family for their safety after escaping his order to execute a prisoner, sending Darya to be raised by Mansour. He affirms that he would refuse to kill even if he was aware that his now deceased wife was pregnant with Darya. Bahram has a violent coughing fit while the couple drives Darya to the airport, and while Zaman stops to help him, Darya observes a fox in the brush nearby before they get back in the car.

== Cast ==
Credits adapted from the film's ending credits.

Episode I

- Ehsan Mirhosseini as Heshmat
- Shaghayegh Shourian as Razieh

Episode II

- Kaveh Ahangar as Pouya
- Alireza Zareparast as Hasan
- Salar Khamseh as Salar
- Kaveh Ebrahim as Amir
- Reza Bahrami as Ali
- Darya Moghbeli as Tahmineh

Episode III

- Mohammad Valizadegan as Javad
- Mahtab Servati as Nana
- Anahita Eghbalnejad as Nana's Mother
- Hassan Tasiri as Nana's Father

Episode IV

- Mohammad Seddighimehr as Bahram
- Jila Shahi as Zaman
- Baran Rasoulof as Darya

== Themes ==
Rasoulof explained that the film is about "people taking responsibility" for their actions, and that each story "is based on my own experience".

== Production ==
There Is No Evil was directed by Mohammad Rasoulof. Recorded secretly, the film is banned from being shown in Iran.

== Release ==
The film was shown at the Berlin Film Festival in February 2020.

Farhang Foundation and the UCLA Film & Television Archive released There Is No Evil online from 14 May to 10 June 2021, and it was shown at the 68th Sydney Film Festival, Australia, in November 2021.

== Reception ==
=== Critical response ===
On review aggregator Rotten Tomatoes, the film holds an approval rating of 98% based on 54 reviews, with an average rating of 8.2/10. The website's critical consensus states: "There Is No Evil thoughtfully poses troubling questions about man's responsibility to man -- and leaves the viewer to try and answer them".. On Metacritic, the film has a weighted average score of 82 out of 100, based on 15 critics, indicating "universal acclaim".

=== Accolades ===
- It won the Golden Bear at the 70th Berlin International Film Festival in February 2020.
- Sydney Film Prize, November 2021

Rasoulof was unable to attend as he was jailed and banned from leaving Iran.

== See also ==
- Media censorship in Iran
- List of films banned in Iran
