= Friends and Strangers =

- Directed by: James Vaughan
- Written by: James Vaughan
- Produced by: Rebecca Lamond; Lucy Rennick
- Starring: Fergus Wilson; Emma Diaz
- Cinematography: Dimitri Zaunders
- Edited by: James Vaughan
- Release date: 2021
- Running time: 81 minutes
- Country: Australia
- Language: English

Friends and Strangers is a 2021 Australian comedy/drama film written and directed by James Vaughan.

== Cast ==
- Fergus Wilson as Ray
- Emma Diaz as Alice
- Greg Zimbulis as David
- Steve Maxwell as Wes
- Poppy Jones as Lauren
- David Gannon as Miles
- Ion Pearce as Lauren's father
- Victoria Maxwell as Diana
- Jacki Rochester as Carol
- Amelia Conway as Louise
- Malcolm Kennard as Jay
- Jayden Muir as Sam
- Stefan Solomon as Patrick
- Eliza Oliver as tour guide
- Kat Try as hairdresser

== Reception ==
Rotten Tomatoes lists 18 critics with 13 assessed as fresh and 5 as rotten. It gave the film a score of 72%.

David Stratton, writing in The Australian, gave it 4 stars. He begins "Friends and Strangers is a strikingly original new Australian film from writer, director and editor James Vaughan. Tantalisingly enigmatic, it is on the surface about the various contacts and encounters made by Ray (Fergus Wilson), a diffident freelance video cameraman."

Jane Freebury in the Canberra Times gave it 4 stars. She notes "Friends and Strangers is clearly about class, generational conflict and colonialism, but writer-director James Vaughan offers up a main character who doesn't really know what he wants in life, let alone how to get it, and there is little in the way of a narrative arc."

The Age's Jake Wilson also gave it 4 stars writing "For all its quizzical menace, Friends and Strangers is an oddly enticing film, not immune to the allure of affluence and leisure and committed to gratifying the viewer with a stream of small surprises."

Leslie Felperin of the Guardian gave it 3 stars saying "The way Vaughan and his team film and edit the movie, using lots of still long takes, suggests we’re either supposed to think it’s all comic or profound. In the end it’s neither, but not uninteresting."

Writing for RogerEbert.com Tomris Laffly gave it 2/4, saying "this ambiguously humorous film with a shaky pace and viewpoint sets forth a tough proposition: will you be patient for its 80+ minutes of running time, accept that nothing much will actually happen throughout that duration and settle for occasional jolts of rewards only?"

Reviewing in the New York Times Ben Kenigsberg gave it a NYT Critic's Pick stating "While the pieces don’t necessarily fit in obvious ways, that’s presumably the point — and part of what makes Friends and Strangers so singular."

== Awards ==
- 11th AACTA Awards
  - Best Editing - James Vaughan - nominated
