= Mohammad Rasoulof =

Iranian filmmaker (born 1972)

- محمد رسول‌اف
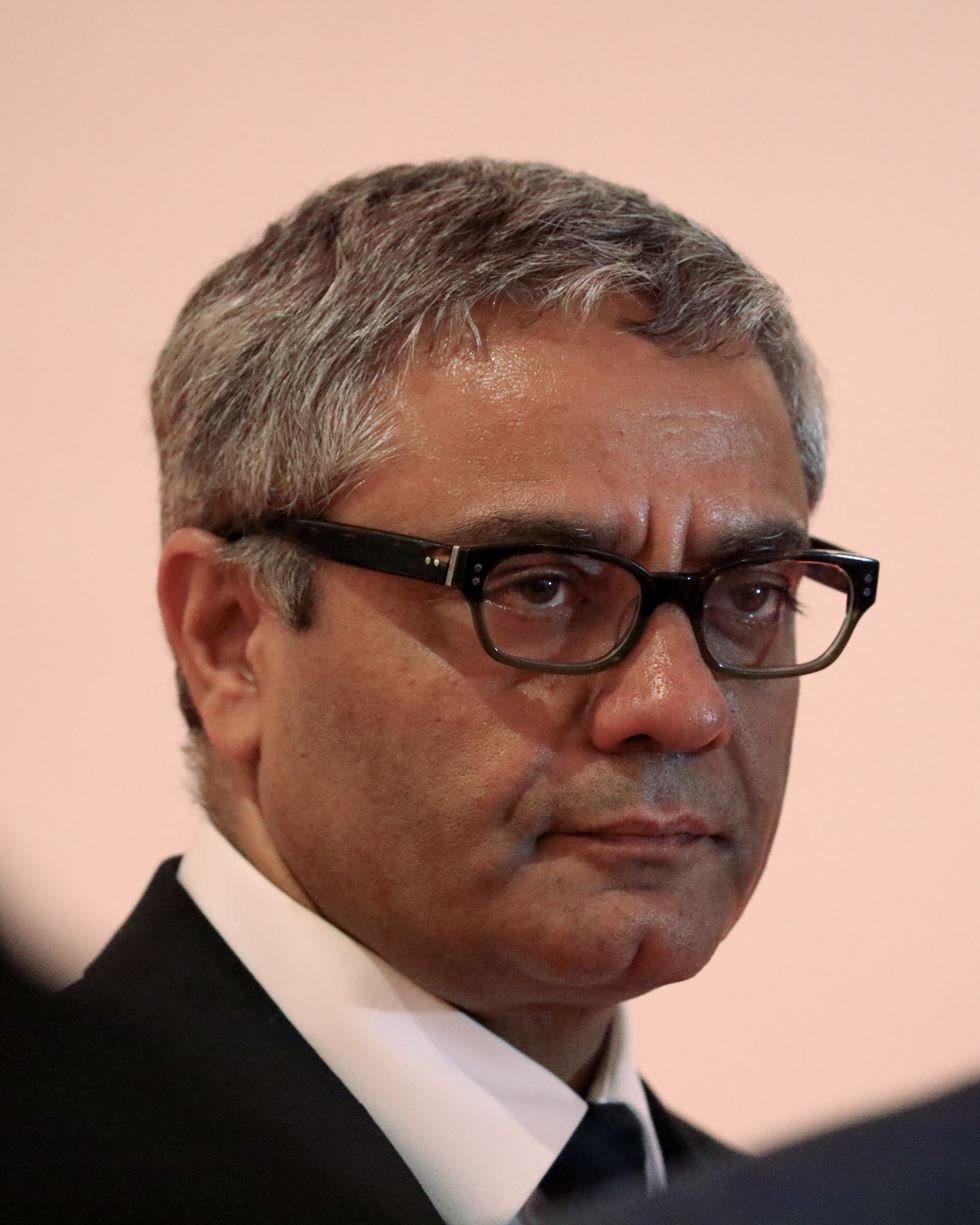
- Rasoulof in 2024
- Born: 16 November 1972 (age 53); Shiraz, Imperial State of Iran
- Occupations: director; producer; screenwriter; editor
- Years active: 2001–present
- Children: 1

Mohammad Rasoulof (Persian: محمد رسول‌اف; born 16 November 1972) is an Iranian independent filmmaker who lives in exile in Europe. He is known for several award-winning films, including The Twilight (2002), Iron Island (2005), Goodbye (2011), Manuscripts Don't Burn (2013), A Man of Integrity (2017) and There Is No Evil (2020). For the latter, he won the Golden Bear at the 2020 Berlin Film Festival. In 2025, Rasoulof was named one of the 100 Most Influential People by Time.

He has been arrested several times and had his passport confiscated, as the nature and content of his films has brought him into conflict with the Iranian Government. In May 2024, following the announcement that his film The Seed of the Sacred Fig was selected in the main competition at the 2024 Cannes Film Festival, Mohammad Rasoulof was sentenced by the Islamic Republic to 8 years in prison, whipping, and a fine. Rasoulof fled to a safe house in Germany after the sentencing.

== Early life and education ==
Mohammad Rasoulof was born on 16 November 1972 in Shiraz, Iran. He graduated with a bachelor's degree in sociology from Shiraz University, and he has studied film editing at Soore University, Tehran.

== Career ==
His first feature-length film, The Twilight (Gagooman), was released in 2002 and was awarded the Crystal Simorgh for Best First Film at the Fajr International Film Festival in Tehran. His second feature, Iron Island (Jazire-ye ahani), was released in 2005. His feature The White Meadows (Keshtzarha-ye sepid) was released in 2009.

Goodbye (Be omid-e didar) premiered at the 2011 Cannes Film Festival in the Un Certain Regard section and won the prize for directing. His film Manuscripts Don't Burn also premiered in the Un Certain Regard section at the 2013 Cannes Film Festival, where it won the FIPRESCI Prize. A Man of Integrity won the top prize in the Un Certain Regard section at the 2017 Cannes Film Festival.

In June 2017, Rasoulof was invited to become a member of the Academy of Motion Picture Arts and Sciences.

There Is No Evil was awarded the Golden Bear in the main competition section at the 70th Berlin International Film Festival in 2020, and the Sydney Film Prize at the 68th Sydney Film Festival in 2021.

In 2024, Rasoulof served as the president of the New Currents jury at the 29th Busan International Film Festival.

== Legal problems and exile ==
In 2010, Rasoulof was arrested on set and accused of filming without a permit. He was sentenced to six years in prison, later reduced to one year.

In September 2017 his passport was confiscated upon his return to Iran, meaning he became mamnu'-ol-xoruğ (Persian: ممنوع‌الخروج), i.e. banned from leaving the country. Furthermore, he was ordered to attend a court hearing.

On 23 July 2019, Rasoulof was convicted by the Islamic Revolutionary Court of Iran to one-year imprisonment and a two-year ban on leaving the country and on participation in social and political activity because of his film A Man of Integrity. He is accused of "gathering and collusion against national security and of propaganda against the system". In August 2019 Rasoulof appealed the verdict. On his way to the court, in an act of professional solidarity, he and his lawyer were accompanied by some of the most renowned Iranian filmmakers, including Kianoush Ayyari, Majid Barzegar, Reza Dormishian, Asghar Farhadi, Bahman Farmanara, Rakhshān Banietemad, Fatemeh Motamed-Arya, Jafar Panahi, and Hasan Pourshirazi.

On 4 March 2020, Rasoulof was sentenced to one year in prison for three of his movies, which were considered "propaganda against the system". The verdict also included a ban on making films for two years. He stated that he intends to appeal the decision and will not turn himself in, considering the ongoing coronavirus pandemic, which had already led Iran to release 54,000 prisoners temporarily in order to prevent the virus from spreading.

Rasoulof was originally scheduled to take part in the 2023 Cannes Film Festival as a jury member of the Un Certain Regard section. However, he with Mostafa Aleahmad was arrested in July 2022 after criticising the government's crackdown on protestors in the southwestern city of Abadan over a deadly building collapse. He was temporarily released from prison in February 2023 due to his health. Rasoulof was later pardoned and sentenced to a year in prison and a two-year ban on leaving Iran for "propaganda against the regime."

Following the announcement that his film The Seed of the Sacred Fig was selected in the main competition at the 2024 Cannes Film Festival, the cast and crew were interrogated by Iranian authorities, banned from leaving the country, and pressured to convince Rasoulof to withdraw the film from the festival line-up. On 8 May 2024, Rasoulof's lawyer announced that the director has been sentenced to eight years in prison as well as flogging, a fine and confiscation of his property.

Shortly after, Rasoulof, and some crew members, managed to flee from Iran. While appealing his sentence, Rasoulof planned his "exhausting, long, complicated, and anguishing journey" out of Iran, which took a total of 28 days. He traveled on foot for several hours with a guide to a village at the border on the Iranian side, where he waited for the appropriate time to cross. He was transferred to a safe house in a village on the non-Iranian side, where he waited for an extended period of time. He was then moved to a town with a German consulate. His passport had been seized by Iranian authorities, so he had no documents to identify himself. However, Rasoulof previously lived in Germany so he contacted the German authorities, who were able to identify him using his fingerprints and issued him a temporary travel document which he used to travel to Germany. On 24 May 2024, he attended the red carpet in Cannes, where later he received a Special Award for his film.

In January 2026, he posted along with Jafar Panahi a statement regarding the protests and massacres in Iran. The statement addressed also the internet blackout in Iran: “On the one hand, the Iranian regime has cut off communication routes inside the country – the internet, mobile phones, and landlines – severing people’s ability to communicate with one another; and on the other hand, it has completely blocked all means of contact with the outside world".

On 28 January 2026, Rasoulof, along with several other Iranian intellectuals, including Amirsalar Davoudi, Hatam Ghaderi, Abolfazl Ghadyani, Mehdi Mahmoudian, Abdollah Momeni, Mohammad Najafi, Jafar Panahi, Nasrin Sotoudeh, and Sedigheh Vasmaghi, and the Narges Mohammadi Human Rights Foundation, published a statement on Instagram asserting that the 2026 Iran massacres were a crime against humanity, accusing Supreme Leader of Iran Ali Khamenei of holding principal responsibility.

== Filmography ==
=== Feature films ===
Year	English title	Original title	Notes
2002	The Twilight	گاگومان	Docu-Fiction
2005	Iron Island	جزیره آهنی	
2009	The White Meadows	کشتزارهای سپید	
2011	Goodbye	به امید دیدار	
2013	Manuscripts Don't Burn	دست‌نوشته‌ها نمی‌سوزند	
2017	A Man of Integrity	لِرد	
2020	There Is No Evil	شیطان وجود ندارد	Also producer
2024	The Seed of the Sacred Fig	دانه انجیر مقدس	Also producer

=== Documentary ===
Year	English title	Original title
2008	Head Wind	باد دبور
2022	Jenayat-e amdi	جنایت عمدی

=== Other credits ===
Year	English title	Original title	Writer	Producer	Notes
2010	Gesher		No	Yes	
2019	The Red Hatchback	هاچ‌بک قرمز	Yes	Yes	Co-written with Ashkan Najafi; Co-produced with Kaveh Farnam, Farzad Pak, Rozita Hendijanian
2019	Son-Mother	مادر-پسر	Yes	Yes	Co-produced with Kaveh Farnam, Farzad Pak

== Awards and nominations ==
Award	Year (Note: Indicates the year of ceremony. Each year is linked to the article about the awards held that year, wherever possible.)	Work	Category	Result	Ref.
Academy Awards	2025	The Seed of the Sacred Fig	Best International Feature Film (as Germany's entry)	Nominated	
Adelaide Film Festival	2017	A Man of Integrity	International Best Feature Fiction Award	Nominated	
Amiens International Film Festival	2011	—N/a	Golden Unicorn for Career Achievement	Won	
Antalya Golden Orange Film Festival	2011	Goodbye	Youth Jury Award	Won	
Antalya Golden Orange Film Festival	2011	Goodbye	SIYAD (Cinema Writers' Foundation) Jury Award	Won	
Antalya Golden Orange Film Festival	2017	A Man of Integrity	Best Director	Won	
Asian Film Awards	2025	The Seed of the Sacred Fig	Best Screenplay	Won	
Asia Pacific Screen Awards	2011	Goodbye	Best Feature Film	Nominated	
Asia Pacific Screen Awards	2011	Goodbye	Achievement in Directing	Nominated	
Asia Pacific Screen Awards	2017	A Man of Integrity	Best Feature Film	Nominated	
Asia Pacific Screen Awards	2021	There Is No Evil	Best Feature Film	Nominated	
Avanca Film Festival	2007	Iron Island	Feature Film Prize	Won	
Avanca Film Festival	2007	Iron Island	Best Screenplay Prize	Won	
Berlin International Film Festival	2020	There Is No Evil	Golden Bear	Won	
Berlin International Film Festival	2020	There Is No Evil	Prize of the Ecumenical Jury	Won	
Berlin International Film Festival	2020	There Is No Evil	Guild Film Prize	Won	
British Academy Film Awards	2025	The Seed of the Sacred Fig	Best Film Not in the English Language	Nominated	
British Independent Film Awards	2024	The Seed of the Sacred Fig	Best International Independent Film	Nominated	
Calgary International Film Festival	2020	There Is No Evil	Audience Award – International Narrative Feature	Won	
Cannes Film Festival	2011	Goodbye	Prix Un Certain Regard	Nominated	
Cannes Film Festival	2011	Goodbye	Un Certain Regard – Directing Prize	Won	
Cannes Film Festival	2011	Goodbye	François Chalais Prize – Special Mention	Won	
Cannes Film Festival	2013	Manuscripts Don't Burn	Prix Un Certain Regard	Nominated	
Cannes Film Festival	2013	Manuscripts Don't Burn	FIPRESCI Prize – Un Certain Regard	Won	
Cannes Film Festival	2017	A Man of Integrity	Prix Un Certain Regard	Won	
Cannes Film Festival	2024	The Seed of the Sacred Fig	Palme d'Or	Nominated	
Cannes Film Festival	2024	The Seed of the Sacred Fig	Special Award (Prix Spécial)	Won	
Cannes Film Festival	2024	The Seed of the Sacred Fig	FIPRESCI Prize	Won	
Cannes Film Festival	2024	The Seed of the Sacred Fig	Prize of the Ecumenical Jury	Won	
Cannes Film Festival	2024	The Seed of the Sacred Fig	François Chalais Prize	Won	
Cannes Film Festival	2024	The Seed of the Sacred Fig	Prix des Cinémas Art et Essai	Won	
César Awards	2025	The Seed of the Sacred Fig	Best Foreign Film	Nominated	
Chicago International Film Festival	2017	A Man of Integrity	Gold Hugo	Nominated	
Chicago International Film Festival	2017	A Man of Integrity	Best Screenplay	Won	
Chicago International Film Festival	2024	The Seed of the Sacred Fig	Silver Hugo – Best Screenplay	Won	
Chlotrudis Society for Independent Films	2007	Iron Island	Buried Treasure	Won	
Cleveland International Film Festival	2021	There Is No Evil	International Narrative Competition	Won	
Crested Butte Film Festival	2020	There Is No Evil	Courage in Filmmaking	Won	
Denver Film Festival	2010	The White Meadows	Krzysztof Kieslowski Award for Best Feature Film	Won	
Dubai International Film Festival	2009	The White Meadows	Special Jury Prize	Won	
Durban International Film Festival	2010	The White Meadows	Best Feature Film	Won	
Durban International Film Festival	2012	Goodbye	Special Jury Mention	Won	
European Film Awards	2024	The Seed of the Sacred Fig	European Film	Nominated	
European Film Awards	2024	The Seed of the Sacred Fig	European Director	Nominated	
European Film Awards	2024	The Seed of the Sacred Fig	European Screenwriter	Nominated	
Fajr International Film Festival	2003	The Twilight	Crystal Simorgh for Best First Film	Won	
Festival du nouveau cinéma	2005	Iron Island	Special Mention	Won	
Festival du nouveau cinéma	2005	Iron Island	Best Screenplay	Won	
Film Fest Gent	2017	A Man of Integrity	Grand Prix	Nominated	
Filmfest Hamburg	2005	Iron Island	Critics' Choice Award	Won	
Filmfest Hamburg	2013	Manuscripts Don't Burn	Political Film of the Friedrich-Ebert-Stiftung	Won	
Filmfest Hamburg	2017	A Man of Integrity	Critics' Choice Award	Nominated	
Films from the South	2020	There Is No Evil	Silver Mirror Award	Won	
Fribourg International Film Festival	2014	Manuscripts Don't Burn	Special Mention	Won	
Fribourg International Film Festival	2014	Manuscripts Don't Burn	Grand Prix	Nominated	
German Film Awards	2025	The Seed of the Sacred Fig	Best Feature Film	Silver	
German Film Awards	2025	The Seed of the Sacred Fig	Best Director	Nominated	
German Film Awards	2025	The Seed of the Sacred Fig	Best Screenplay	Nominated	
Gijón International Film Festival	2005	Iron Island	Special Jury Prize	Won	
Golden Apricot Yerevan International Film Festival	2017	A Man of Integrity	FIPRESCI Prize	Won	
Heartland International Film Festival	2020	There Is No Evil	Grand Prize for Narrative Feature	Won	
Hong Kong International Film Festival	2012	Goodbye	SIGNIS Award	Nominated	
International Cinephile Society	2025	The Seed of the Sacred Fig	Best Original Screenplay	Nominated	
International Film Festival of India	2005	Iron Island	Golden Peacock	Won	
International Film Festival of India	2017	A Man of Integrity	Golden Peacock	Nominated	
International Film Festival Rotterdam	2012	Goodbye	Dioraphte Award	Won	
Iran Cinema Celebration	2002	The Twilight	Best Documentary	Won	
Jerusalem Film Festival	2017	A Man of Integrity	Honorable Mention	Won	
Jerusalem Film Festival	2017	A Man of Integrity	International Competition	Nominated	
Lisbon & Estoril Film Festival	2017	A Man of Integrity	Best Film Award (Jaeger-LeCoultre)	Nominated	
Los Angeles Film Critics Association	2024	The Seed of the Sacred Fig	Best Director	Won	
Los Angeles Film Critics Association	2024	The Seed of the Sacred Fig	Best Film Not in the English Language	Runner-up	
Lumière Awards	2025	The Seed of the Sacred Fig	Best International Co-Production	Won	
Luxembourg City Film Festival	2014	Manuscripts Don't Burn	Grand Prix	Won	
Milwaukee Film Festival	2012	Goodbye	Best Film	Nominated	
Milwaukee Film Festival	2012	Goodbye	Best Director	Won	
Montclair Film Festival	2020	There Is No Evil	Fiction Feature Prize	Won	
National Board of Review	2024	The Seed of the Sacred Fig	Best International Film	Won	
Nuremberg International Human Rights Film Festival	2013	—N/a	Lifetime Achievement Award	Won	
Philadelphia Film Festival	2020	There Is No Evil	Audience Award	Won	
San Sebastián International Film Festival	2009	The White Meadows	Golden Shell	Nominated	
San Sebastián International Film Festival	2024	The Seed of the Sacred Fig	City of Donostia / San Sebastian Audience Award for Best European Film	Won	
Seattle International Film Festival	2021	There Is No Evil	Golden Space Needle Audience Award for Best Film	Won	
Seattle International Film Festival	2021	There Is No Evil	Official Competition Grand Jury Prize	Nominated	
Sydney Film Festival	2021	There Is No Evil	Sydney Film Prize	Won	
Tallinn Black Nights Film Festival	2005	Iron Island	Grand Prize	Nominated	
Telluride Film Festival	2013	—N/a	Silver Medallion	Won	
Tokyo Filmex	2011	Goodbye	Grand Prize	Nominated	
Tokyo International Film Festival	2026	—N/a	Kurosawa Akira Award	Honored	
Toronto Film Critics Association	2023	—N/a	Special Citation (shared with Jafar Panahi and Mostafa Al-Ahmad)	Honored	
Tribeca Festival	2010	The White Meadows	Best Narrative Feature	Nominated	
Tromsø International Film Festival	2021	There Is No Evil	Norwegian Peace Film Award	Won	
Valladolid International Film Festival	2018	—N/a	Honorary Spike	Won	
Valladolid International Film Festival	2020	There Is No Evil	Special Mention	Won	
Valladolid International Film Festival	2020	There Is No Evil	Blogos de Oro Award	Won	

== See also ==
- List of Iranian film directors
- Jafar Panahi
- Saeed Roustayi
