= Cinema of Palestine =

- No. of screens: 2 (2007)
  - Per capita: 0.1 per 100,000 (2007)

Number of admissions (2007)
- Total: 64,026

Cinema of Palestine refers to films made in Palestine and/or by Palestinian filmmakers. Palestinian films are not exclusively produced in Arabic and some are produced in English and French.

== History ==
=== The first period: The beginning, 1935–1948 ===
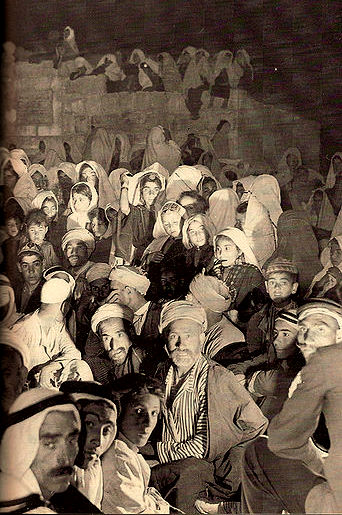
Villagers of Halhul waiting for an open-air film show, around 1940

The first Palestinian film to be made is generally believed to be a documentary on King Ibn Saud of Saudi Arabia's visit in 1935 to Mandatory Palestine, made by Ibrahim Hassan Sirhan (or Serhan), based in Jaffa. Sirhan followed the King and around Mandatory Palestine, "from Lod to Jaffa and from Jaffa to Tel Aviv". The result was a silent movie that was presented at the Nabi Rubin festivals. Following this documentary, Sirhan joined Jamal al-Asphar to produce a 45-minute film called The Realized Dreams, aiming to "promote the orphans' cause". Sirhan and al-Asphar also produced a documentary about Ahmad Hilmi Pasha, a member of the Higher Arab Commission. In 1945 Sirhan established the Arab Film Company with Ahmad Hilmi al-Kilani. The company launched the feature film Holiday Eve, which was followed by preparations for the next film A Storm at Home. The films themselves were lost in 1948, when Sirhan had to flee Jaffa after the town was bombarded.

=== The second period: The epoch of silence, 1948–1967 ===
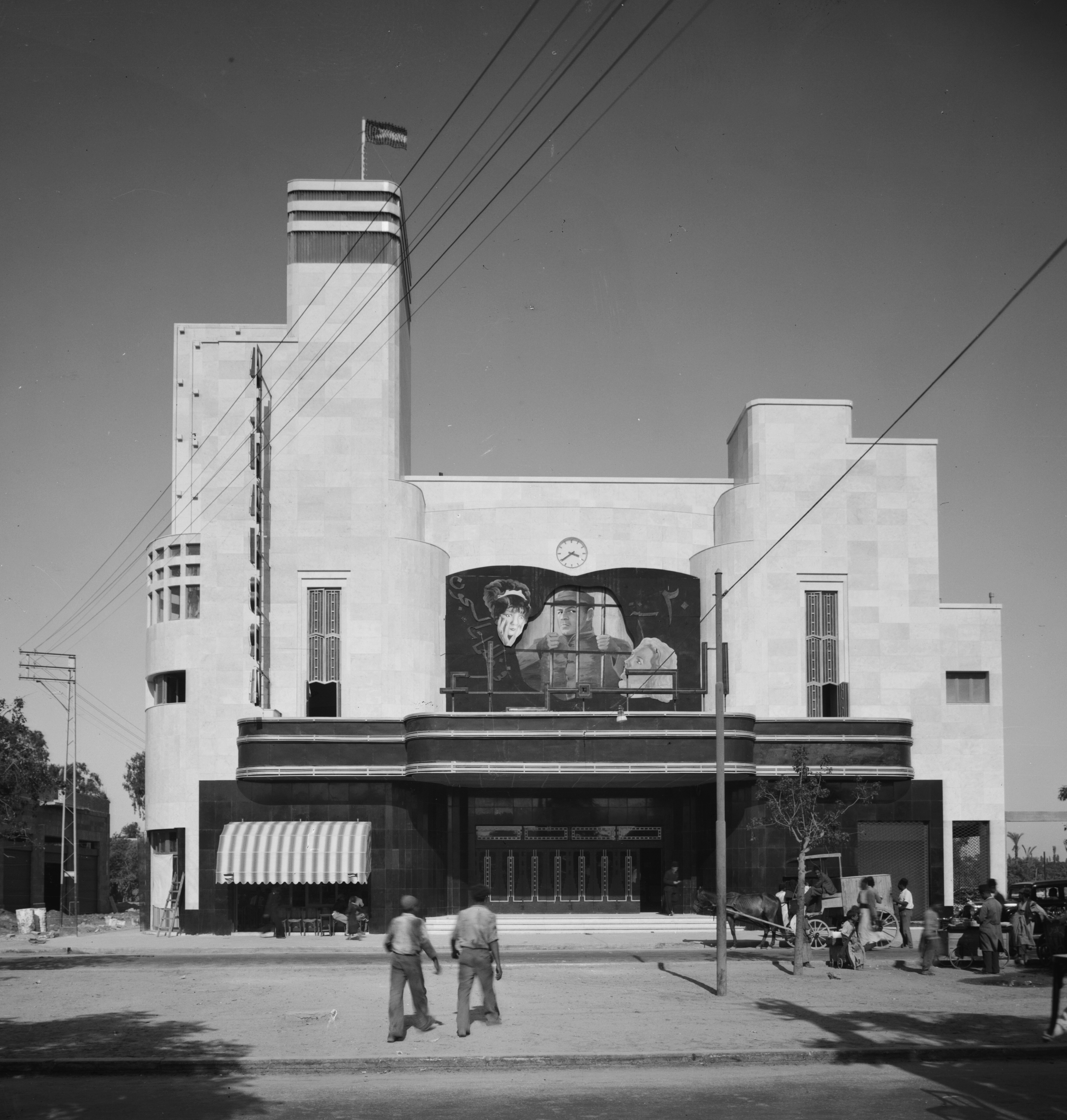
In the 1960s, there was a small group of people that started filming the Palestinian Revolution. The PLO (Palestinian Liberation Organization) helped tremendously with allowing people such as Arab filmmakers start up their films. In the late 60s, these films that were being made, around 100 or more, focused mostly on themes such as collective resistance, exile, and refugees with Palestinians being displaced by Israel at this time. These films were being screened in refugee camps, military bases, villages and towns, and sometimes even gained international recognition. The distribution of these films was not controlled by the filmmakers but regardless, cinema allowed them to tell their own stories. The Alhambra Cinema in Jaffa, 1937, bombed December 1947

The 1948 Palestinian expulsion and flight (known in Arabic as the Nakba) had a devastating effect on Palestinian society, including its nascent film industry. Cinematic endeavours, requiring infrastructure, professional crews, and finance, nearly ceased for two decades. Individual Palestinian participated in the film-production of neighbouring countries. It is reported that Sirhan was involved with the production of the first Jordanian feature film, The Struggle in Jarash (1957), and another Palestinian, Abdallah Ka'wash, directed the second Jordanian feature film, My Homeland, My Love, in 1964.

=== The third period: Cinema in exile, 1968–1982 ===
After 1967, Palestinian cinema found itself under the auspices of the PLO, funded by Fatah and other Palestinian organisations like PFLP and DFLP. More than 60 films were made in this period, mostly documentaries. The first film festival dedicated to Palestinian films was held in Baghdad in 1973, and Baghdad also hosted the next two Palestinian film festivals, in 1976 and 1980. Mustafa Abu Ali was one of the early Palestinian film directors, and he helped found the Palestinian Cinema Association in Beirut in 1973. Only one dramatic movie was made during the period, namely Return to Haifa in 1982, an adaptation of a short novel by Ghassan Kanafani.

==== The film archives disappearance, 1982 ====
Different organisations set up archives for Palestinian films. The largest such archive was run by PLO's Film Foundation/Palestinian Film Unit. In 1982, when the PLO was forced out of Beirut, the archive was put into storage (in the Red Crescenty Hospital), from where it "disappeared" under circumstances which are still unclear. Recently, several films from the archive were located in the Israel Defense Forces Archive in Tel HaShomer by scholar and curator Rona Sela. Sela has called for the release of these films, and for the declassification of other Palestinian films that remain closed in the IDF Archive.

=== The fourth period: The return home, from 1980 to the present ===
In 1987, there was the first Intifada, and this led to an increase in news coverage in Palestine, showcasing their occupation. This is when filmmakers started getting back up to make more films, in documentarian style, as they were given the understanding of film techniques through these news reporters. This is when a new era of Palestinian cinema emerged. Focusing on Israeli occupation and Palestinian experiences, it differed from their previous focus on exile during the PLO days. There were also “emergency films” and “roadblock films” which called spectators to action on behalf of Palestinians’ struggles and the other genre categorized for its use of checkpoints in its films. Now in the 2000s, Palestinian cinema is re focused on collective resistance from Israeli forces.

The 1996 drama/comedy Chronicle of a Disappearance, from Palestinian filmmaker Elia Suleiman, received international critical acclaim, and it became the first Palestinian movie to receive national release in the United States. A break-out film for its genre, it won a New Director's Prize at the Seattle International Film Festival and a Luigi De Laurentiis Award at the Venice Film Festival. Notable film directors of this period include Michel Khleifi, Rashid Masharawi, Ali Nassar and Elia Suleiman.

An international effort was launched in 2008 to reopen Cinema Jenin, a cinema located in the Jenin Refugee Camp.

In 2008, three Palestinian feature films and an estimated eight shorts were completed, more than ever before.

In 2010, Hamas, the governing authority in the Gaza Strip, announced the completion of a new film. Titled The Great Liberation, the film depicts the destruction of Israel by Palestinians.

Currently in the Gaza Strip, all film projects must be approved by Hamas' Culture Ministry before they can be screened in public. Independent filmmakers have claimed that the Culture Ministry cracks down on content not conforming to Hamas edicts. In a notable 2010 case, Hamas banned the short film Something Sweet, directed by Khalil al-Muzzayen, which was submitted at the Cannes Film Festival. Hamas banned it from being shown locally due to a four-second scene where a woman is shown with her hair uncovered. In 2011, a film festival hosted by the Gaza Women's Affairs Center included documentaries and fictional pieces on women's issues, but the Culture Ministry censored numerous scenes. One film had to remove a scene where a woman lowered one shoulder of her dress, and another had to remove a scene of a man swearing.

Films from Palestine have been broadcast internationally through services such as Netflix.

== Name ==
In contrast to the way some other locations with associations to film industry are named in casual parlance, the term "Pallywood" has only derogatory connotations.

== Notable directors ==
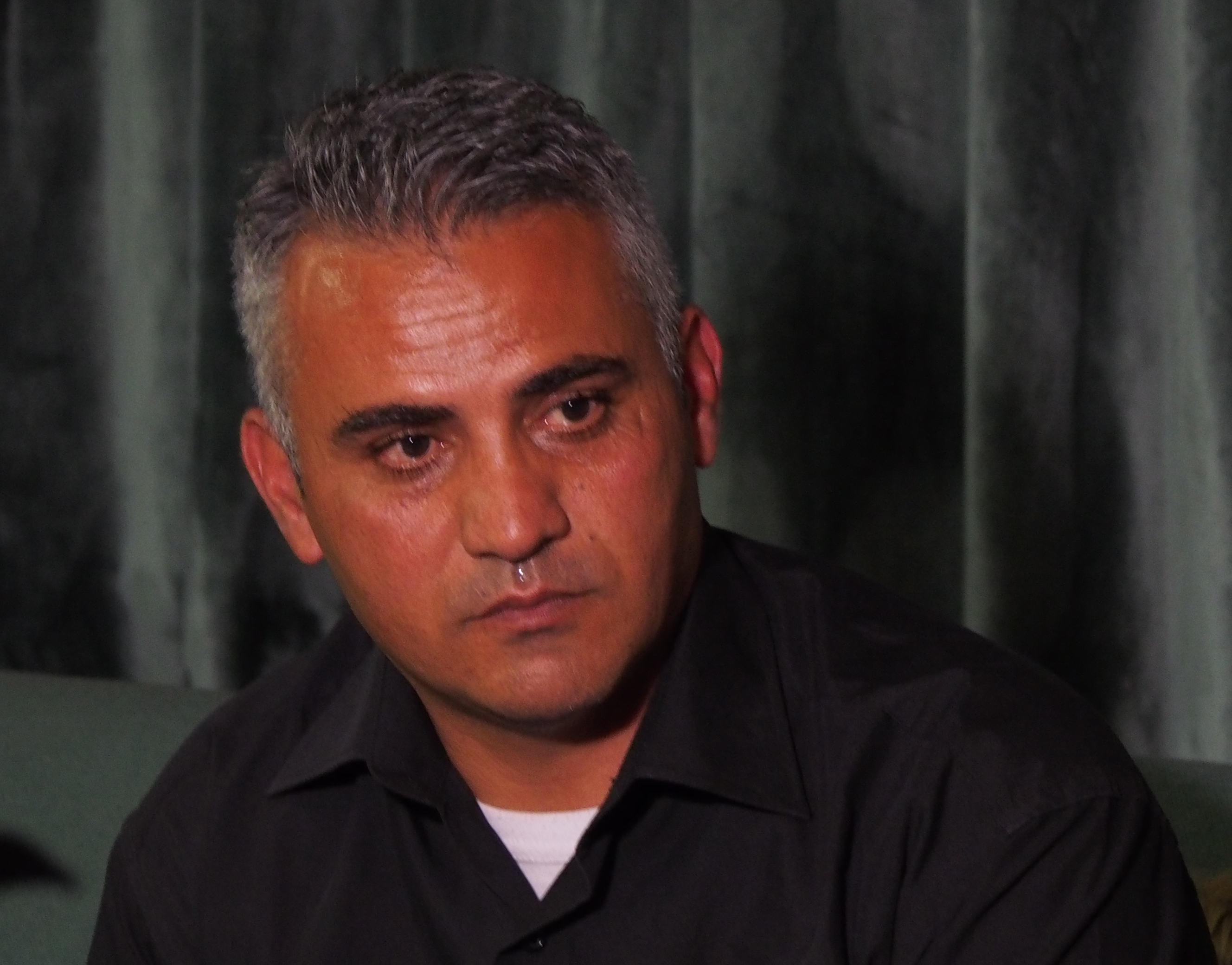
Emad Burnat is a Palestinian farmer and filmmaker.

- Hany Abu-Assad
- Abdallah Al-Khatib
- Azza El-Hassan
- Mahdi Fleifel
- Scandar Copti
- Mustafa Abu Ali
- Mohammad Bakri
- Tarek Al Eryan
- Annemarie Jacir
- Michel Khleifi
- Rashid Masharawi
- Mai Masri
- Montaser Marai
- Rosalind Nashashibi
- Ali Nassar
- Farah Nabulsi
- Elia Suleiman
- Leila Sansour
- Sameh Zoabi
- Ameen Nayfeh
- Najwa Najjar
- Hisham Zreiq

== Notable films ==
- A World Not Ours
- They Don't Exist
- Wedding in Galilee (1987) (International Critics Prize, Cannes),
- Tale of the Three Jewels (1994)
- Chronicle of a Disappearance (1996) (Luigi De Laurentiis Award for a Debut Film at the 1996 Venice Film Festival)
- Divine Intervention (2003).
- Olive Harvest, The (2003)
- Arna's Children (2003)
- Jeremy Hardy vs. the Israeli Army (2004)
- Women in Struggle (2004)
- Waiting (2005)
- Paradise Now (2006) (Golden Globe for Best Foreign Language Film winner)
- The Color of Olives (2006)
- Iron Wall (2006)
- Goal Dreams (2006)
- First Picture (2006)
- The Sons of Eilaboun (2007)
- Maria's Grotto (2007) (Silver Muhr Award, Dubai International Film Festival)
- Kaffa! (2007) (Silver Award for Short Film, Cairo International TV and Media Festival)(Gold Award for Best Script, Tunis International TV and Media Festival)
- Salt of this Sea (2008)
- Taste the Revolution (2008)
- The View (2008) (Best Short Film ($75,000), Middle East International Film Festival)
- Till When? (2008) (Officially selected in Cergy Pontoise Film Festival in Paris, Honorable Mention in Digicon 6 Festival in Tokyo)
- Spider Web (2009)
- Beyond the Sun (2010) (Audience Choice, Bagdad International Film Festival)
- The Uppercut (2012), a short documentary shot in Jordan telling a story of a slum kickboxing club
- Solomon's Stone (film) (2015)
- The Present (2020) (nominated for the Academy Award for best Live Action Short Film, won the BAFTA Award for Best Short Film.)
- The Teacher (2023) (Best International Film at Galway Film Fleadh and Audience Awards at San Francisco International Film Festival, Washington DC International Film Festival, Brooklyn Film Festival, Kosmorama and Cyprus Film Days.)
- No Other Land (2024) (Best Documentary Feature Film at the Academy Awards, Berlinale Documentary Film Award and Panorama Audience Award for Best Documentary Film, the 74th Berlin International Film Festival)
- Three Promises (2023) (Harrell Award at the Camden International Film Festival, Best Documentary Feature at DocPoint Helsinki, Finalist for Henry Awards for Best Documentary for Public Interest)
- Chronicles from the Siege (2026) (Best First Feature Award at the Perspectives section of the 76th Berlin International Film Festival)

== Notable film festivals ==
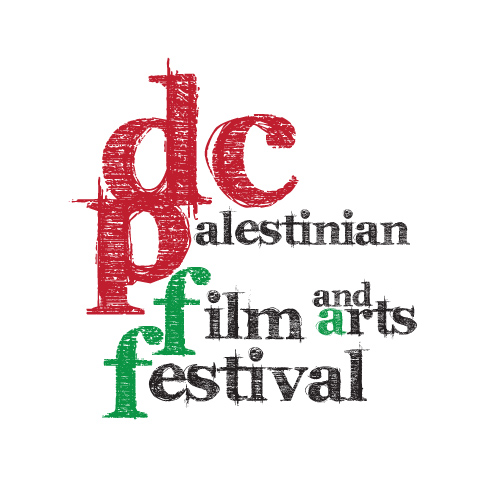
The DC Palestinian Film and Arts Festival (DCPFAF) logo

=== A ===
- Al Ard Film Festival (Cagliari, Sardinia)

=== B ===
- Mostra de Cinema Àrab i Mediterrani de Catalunya (Arab and Mediterranean Film Festival of Catalonia) – Barcelona
- Boston Palestine Film Festival
- Muestra de Cine Palestino de Buenos Aires (Buenos Aires Palestine Film Festival)

=== C ===
- Chicago Palestine Film Festival

=== D ===
- DC Palestinian Film and Arts Festival

=== H ===
- Houston Palestine Film Festival

=== K ===
- The Palestinian Film Festival - Kuwait

=== L ===
- London Palestine Film Festival

=== M ===
- Muestra de Cine Palestino de Madrid (Madrid Palestine Film Festival)
- Mizna's Twin Cities Arab Film Festival
- Festival Cinéma Méditerranéen Montpellier (Montpellier Mediterranean Film Festival)

=== R ===
- Al-Kasaba International Film Festival Al- Kasaba International Film Festival, in Ramallah, West Bank

=== S ===
- Muestra de Cine Palestino de Santiago (Santiago Palestine Film Festival)
- Muestra de Cine Palestino de Sevilla (Sevilla Palestine Film Festival)
- Singapore Palestine Film Festival

=== T ===
- Toronto Palestine Film Festival

== See also ==
- Arab cinema
- Cinema City Nablus
- Al-Kasaba Theatre
- Cinema Jenin
- The First Film of Palestine
