= Filmfest Hamburg =

Annual film festival held in Hamburg, Germany

- Official poster
- Location: Hamburg, Germany
- Founded: 1992
- Most recent: 2025
- Awards: Douglas Sirk Award
- Festival date: Annually, September – October
- Website: Filmfest Hamburg

Current: 34th
- 35th 33rd

Filmfest Hamburg is an annual public film festival held in Hamburg each autumn. It attracts around 60,000 visitors and is considered one of Germany’s leading film festivals, serving as a meeting place for filmmakers, industry professionals and the public.

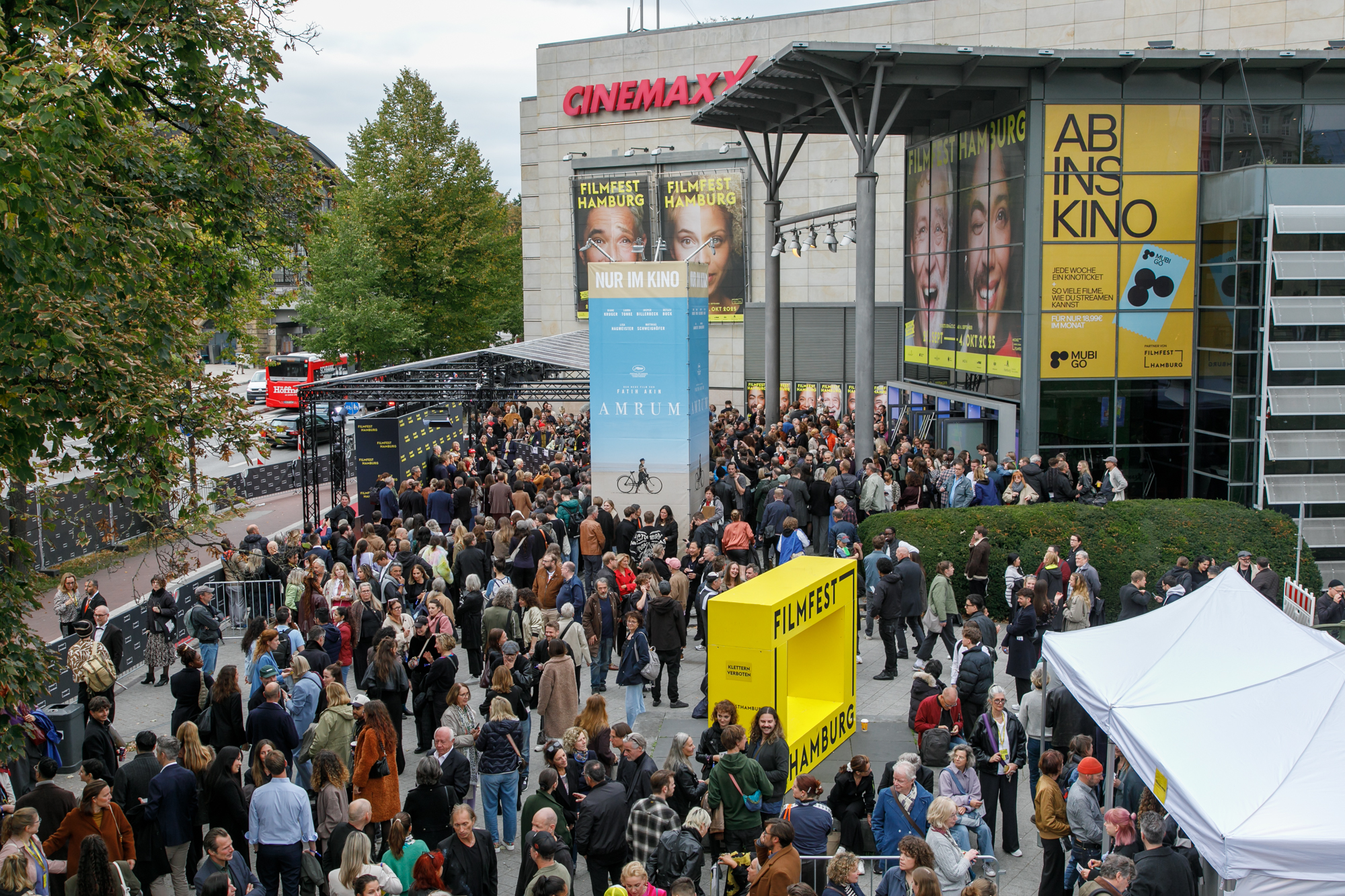
Visitors in front of the CinemaxX Dammtor in Hamburg

Across ten sections, the festival presents around 120 national and international films, including world, European and German premieres. The programme ranges from artistically ambitious arthouse films and television productions to innovative mainstream cinema. The festival sees itself as a venue for cinematic discovery and cultural exchange. Filmmakers from around the world travel to Hamburg to present their work in person and discuss it with audiences.

Since 2019, Filmfest Hamburg has highlighted the work of two filmmakers who have had a significant impact on world cinema through its Filmmaker in Focus format, which combines discussions of their work with a retrospective.

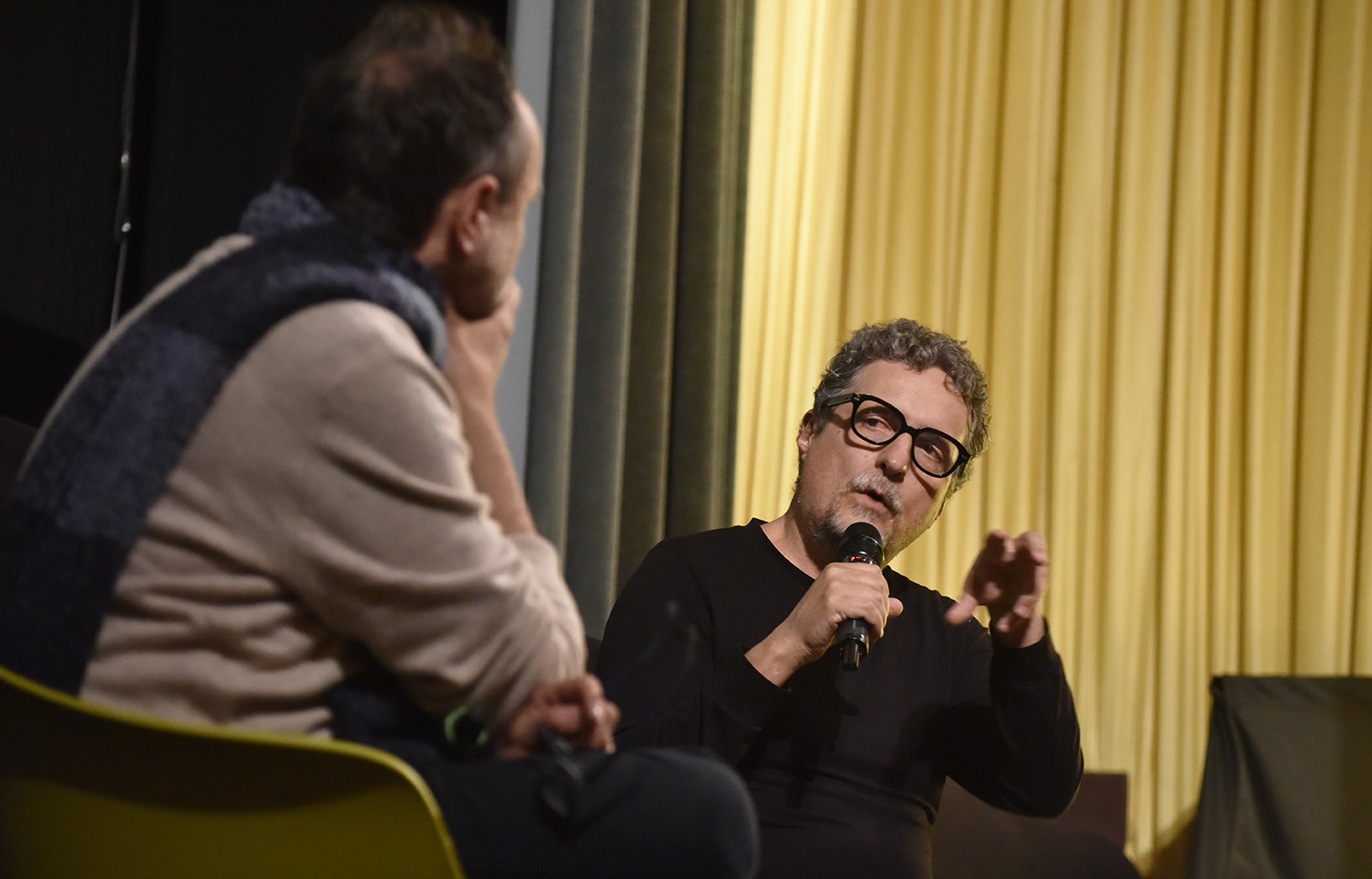
Director Kleber Mendonça Filho in conversation as part of the “Filmmaker in Focus” program at Filmfest Hamburg

In addition to its public film programme, the Filmfest Hamburg Industry Days have formed part of the festival since 2025. After the Berlinale, they are regarded as one of the most important B2B industry gatherings for the German and European film industries.

Since 2024, the festival has also included a Day of Free Admission on 3 October as a permanent fixture. Malika Rabahallah has served as director of Filmfest Hamburg since 2024.

== Programme Sections ==
The festival programme consists of the following sections, some of which were renamed in 2024.

- Kaleidoscope is the international section of Filmfest Hamburg and presents recent feature films from different regions of the world.
- Veto! is the festival’s political section and screens films addressing contemporary social and political issues.
- Große Freiheit showcases current German productions, including debut films and new works by established filmmakers.
- Transatlantic is dedicated to North American cinema, particularly productions from the United States and Canada, with a focus on independent and auteur film.
- Voilà! presents contemporary Francophone cinema from France, Belgium and Quebec.
- Asiascope showcases recent films from East and Southeast Asia and spans a broad range of contemporary cinematic aesthetics.
- Vitrina is dedicated to cinema from Spanish- and Portuguese-speaking regions.
- Hamburg Premieren features films produced or shot in Hamburg.
- Televisionen presents television productions and series on the big screen, often ahead of their television broadcast.
- The MICHEL Children’s and Youth Film Festival is Filmfest Hamburg’s programme for children and young people and features German and international productions.

== Day of Free Entrance ==
The Day of Free Entrance was introduced during the first year of festival director Malika Rabahallah’s tenure, with the support of the Department of Culture and Media of the Free and Hanseatic City of Hamburg.

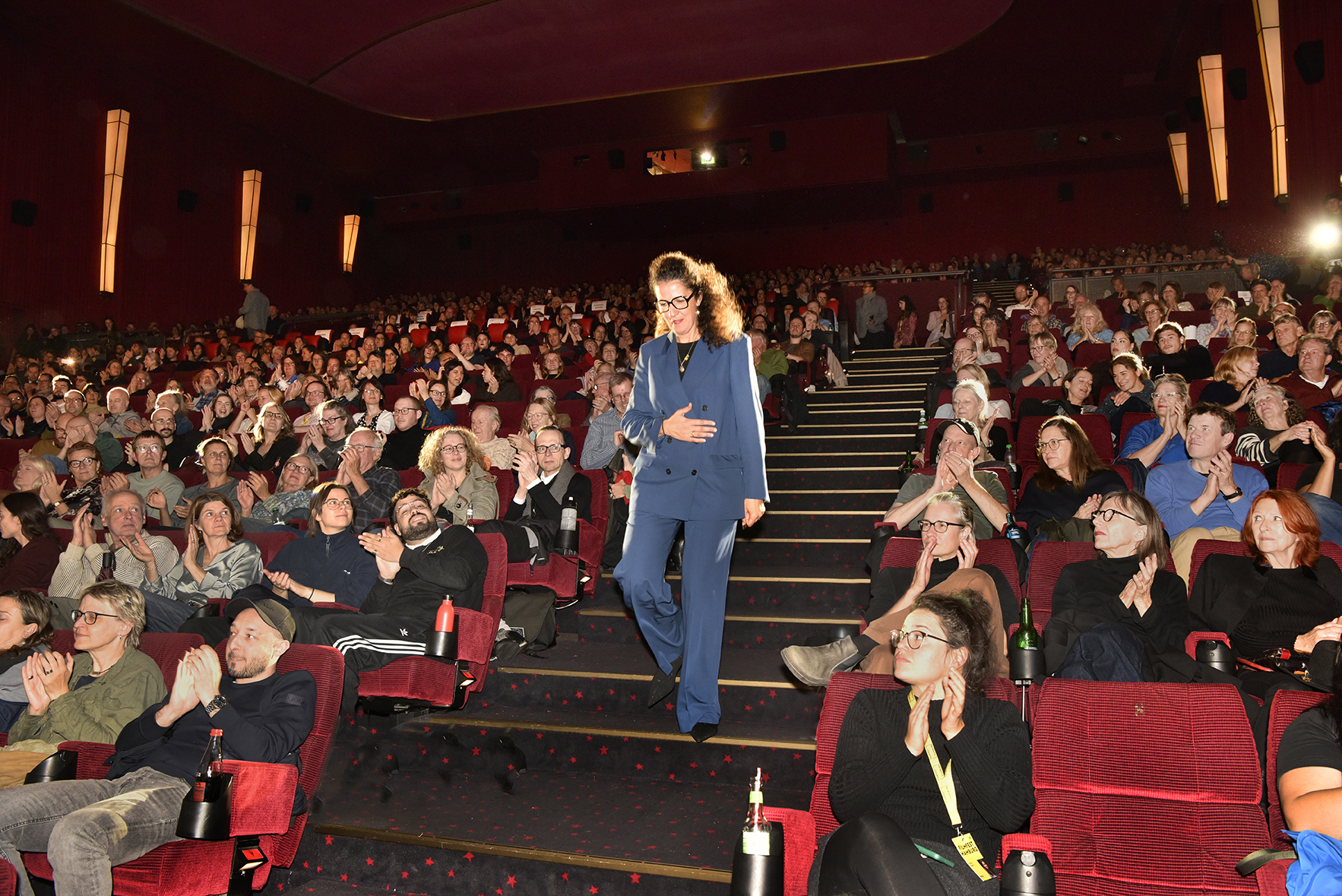
Filmfest Hamburg Director Malika Rabahallah at CinemaxX Dammtor

Since 2024, it has been held annually on 3 October as part of Filmfest Hamburg. On that day, all films in the festival programme can be attended free of charge. The initiative is intended to promote cultural participation and to make the festival accessible to as wide an audience as possible.

== Filmfest Hamburg Industry Days ==
Since 2025, the Filmfest Hamburg Industry Days have formed a separate pillar of the festival programme.

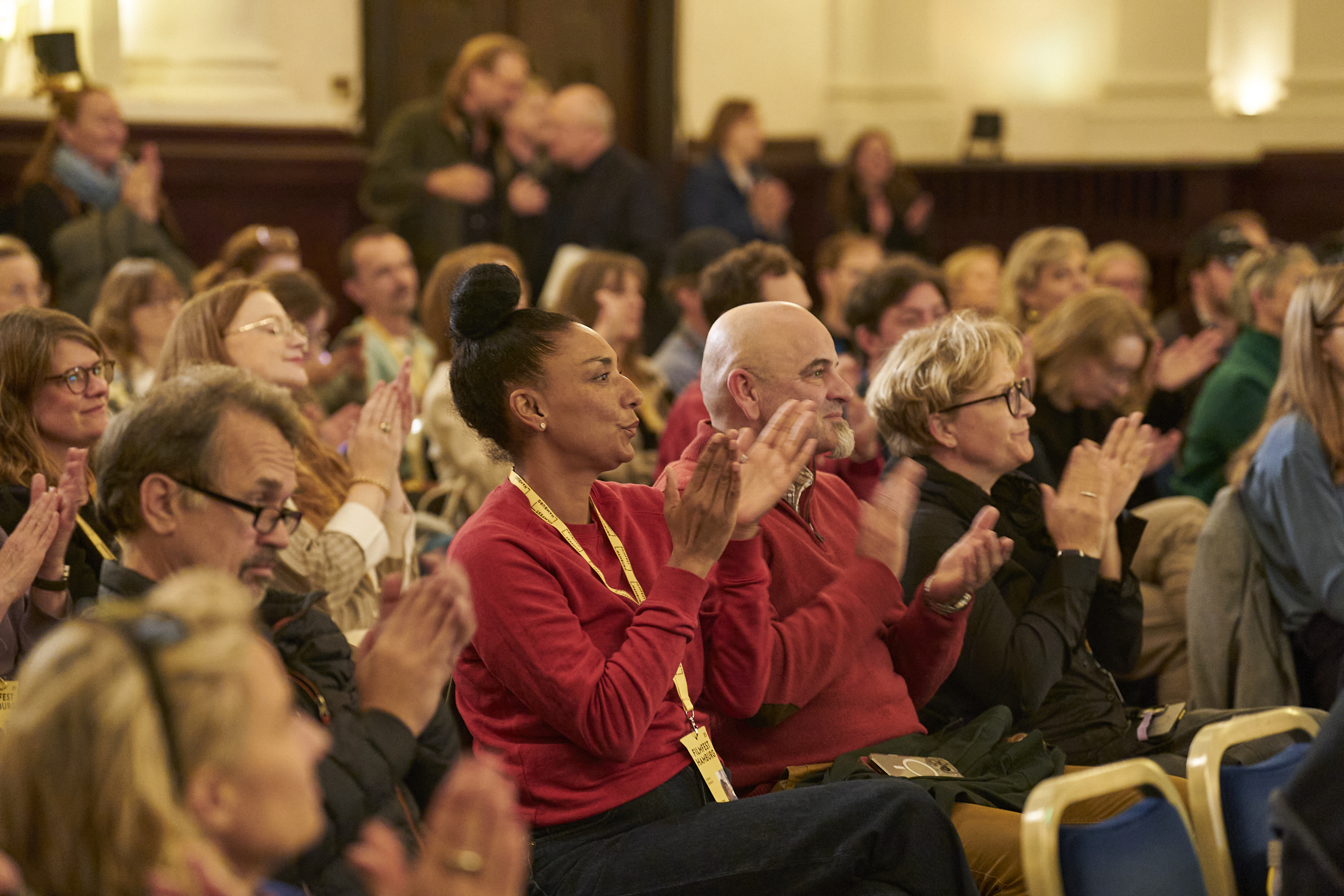
Participants in the Filmfest Hamburg Industry Days as part of Filmfest Hamburg

Aimed at professionals from the German and international film industry, the programme is intended to foster exchange, networking and discussion of current developments in European filmmaking.[9] Its principal events include the European Work in Progress (EWIP) and the International Film Distribution Summit (IFDS), both of which were previously held as part of Film Festival Cologne before moving to Hamburg.

The Industry Days are further complemented by the Explorer Conference, dedicated to future issues in European film production, as well as several talent development and professional training initiatives. These include #ATELIER25, organised in cooperation with the Semaine de la Critique, and FIRST STEPS, as well as the ENCOURAGE Film Talents programme for emerging filmmakers from the DACH region.

== History ==
Film-related events had already been taking place in Hamburg since the 1950s. These included the Hamburg Film Festival, Film Weeks and the Cinema Days, which were organised by the Hamburg film industry in cooperation with various German distribution companies.

In 1968, a group of young filmmakers came together to organise the 1st Hamburg Film Festival, a weekend event that has entered the history of early German cinema as a film happening.

In the 1970s, several arthouse cinemas from across Germany founded Arbeitsgemeinschaft Kino e. V. (AG Kino), based in Hamburg. From 1974 onwards, the association organised the Hamburg Cinema Days.

In 1979, filmmakers from Munich, including Hark Bohm, Werner Herzog, Volker Schlöndorff and Wim Wenders, issued the so-called Hamburg Declaration, opposing what they saw as the external control of German cinema by committees, institutions and interest groups. At the same time, they launched the Filmmakers’ Film Festival. On 29 October 1979, a group of Hamburg-based filmmakers founded Hamburger Filmbüro e. V.

From 1986 onwards, Hamburger Filmbüro organised the European Low Budget Film Forum, which was attended by a number of then little-known directors, including Derek Jarman, Stephen Frears and Lars von Trier. In order to pool their resources and make more effective use of increasingly scarce public funding, the Low Budget Film Forum and the Kinotage merged at the end of 1991. Among the founding members were AG Kino e. V. and Hamburger Filmbüro e. V. Together, they decided to establish Filmfest Hamburg, which was held for the first time in 1992 under the direction of Rosemarie Schatter.

Two years later, film producer Gerhard von Halem became festival director. Although the new festival retained certain links to earlier events, it marked a new departure. While the focus remained on young cinema and independent film, Filmfest Hamburg increasingly came to be associated with the glamour of major international stars.

In 1995, Josef Wutz took over as festival director. Under his leadership, the festival expanded continuously and established itself far beyond Hamburg. During this period, the festival also introduced a dedicated section for Hamburg television productions, while so-called new media were given a platform for presentation and discussion.

In 2003, Albert Wiederspiel became director of Filmfest Hamburg. During his tenure, the international scope of the programme was steadily expanded. After two reduced editions in 2020 and 2021 due to the COVID-19 pandemic, Filmfest Hamburg celebrated its 30th anniversary in 2022 with 116 films from 58 countries shown across six cinemas in Hamburg. In the anniversary year, the Molodist Kyiv International Film Festival was invited as a guest of the festival and held its national short and feature film competitions in Hamburg for the first time. The 31st edition of the festival was the last under Wiederspiel’s direction.

Malika Rabahallah has served as director of Filmfest Hamburg since 2024. During her first year as festival director, she introduced the Day of Free Entrance on 3 October.

To mark the final edition of the festival organised by Albert Wiederspiel, the Hapag-Lloyd Foundation established the Albert Wiederspiel Award for International Film Directing, endowed with €10,000, to be awarded annually from 2023 onwards. By creating and naming the prize, the foundation said it wished to honour Albert Wiederspiel as “a dedicated festival organiser and film enthusiast”.

== Awards ==
The following awards are presented as part of Filmfest Hamburg. Due to the COVID-19 pandemic, however, all awards except the Audience Award were suspended in 2020.

=== Douglas Sirk Award ===
The Douglas Sirk Award is a non-monetary prize named after the filmmaker and Hamburg native Douglas Sirk. It is awarded annually to a person who has made a significant contribution to film culture and the film industry.

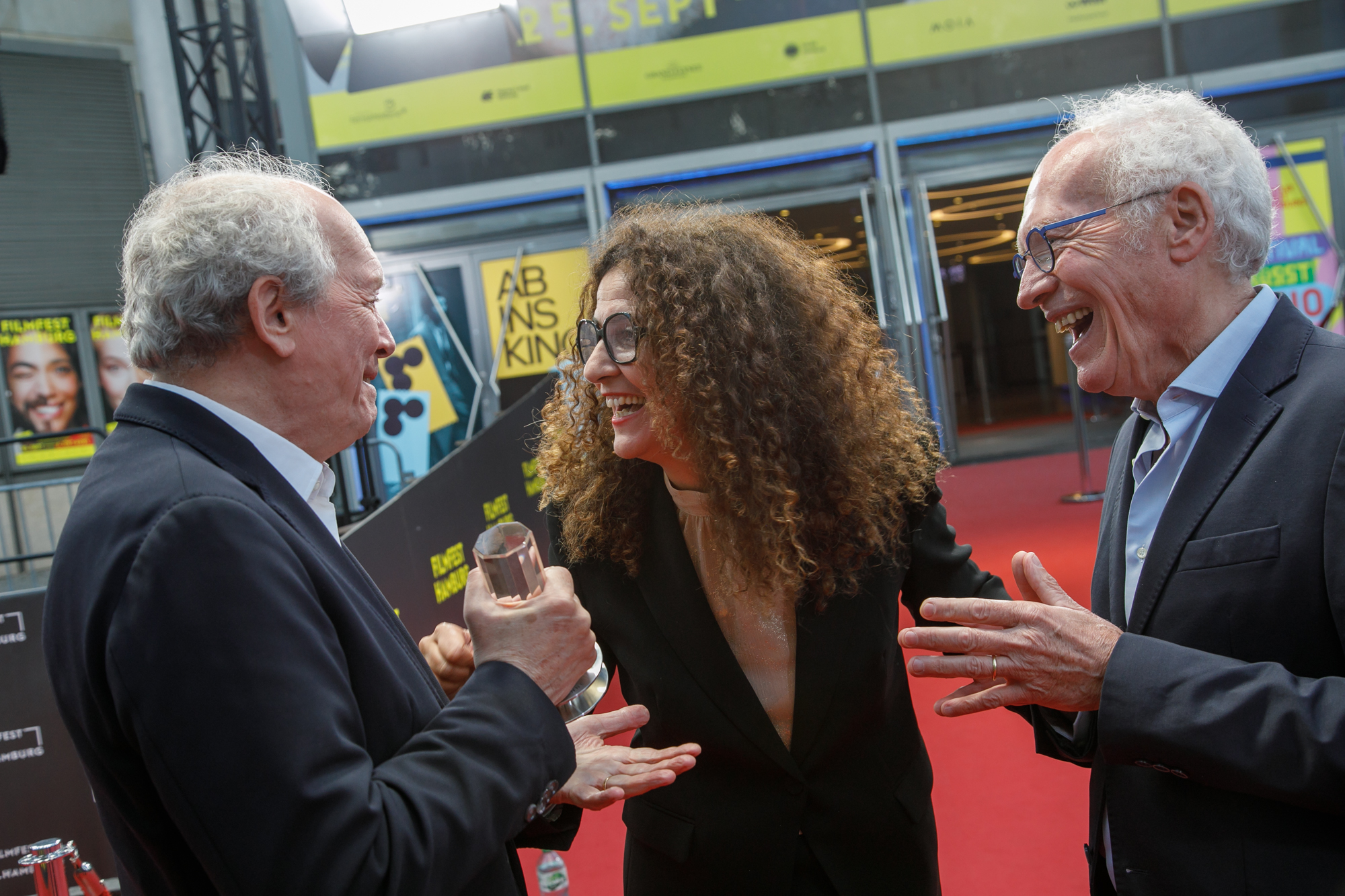
Directors and Douglas Sirk Award winners Luc and Jean-Pierre Dardenne in conversation with Malika Rabahallah as part of Filmfest Hamburg

The prize consists of a crystal sculpture designed by the Hamburg designer Georg Plum. In 2005, for the first time, the award was presented not to an individual but to a company: the Danish production company Zentropa, whose founders include director Lars von Trier.

Laureates

- 1995: Clint Eastwood
- 1996: Stephen Frears
- 1997: Jodie Foster
- 1998: Peter Weir
- 1999: Jim Jarmusch
- 2000: Wong Kar-Wai
- 2001: Majid Majidi
- 2002: Aki Kaurismäki
- 2003: Isabelle Huppert
- 2004: François Ozon
- 2005: Zentropa
- 2006: Gérard Depardieu
- 2007: David Cronenberg
- 2008: Atom Egoyan
- 2009: no award
- 2010: Julian Schnabel
- 2011: Andreas Dresen and Peter Rommel
- 2012: Kim Ki-duk
- 2013: Tilda Swinton
- 2014: Fatih Akin
- 2015: Catherine Deneuve
- 2016: no award
- 2017: Wim Wenders
- 2018: Jafar Panahi
- 2019: Nina Hoss
- 2020: no award
- 2021: Leos Carax
- Ulrich Seidl was originally scheduled to be the 2022 laureate, but following allegations of child exploitation during the filming of Sparta, it was decided not to award the prize.
- 2023: Sandra Hüller
- 2024: Andrea Arnold and Jacques Audiard
- 2025: Jean-Pierre and Luc Dardenne
- 2026: Helen Mirren

=== Hamburg Producers Award International Cinema CoPro ===
The Hamburg Producers Award for International Cinema Co-Productions has been presented since 2014, initially in the Freihafen section and still under the name Hamburg Producers Award for European Cinema Co-Productions. Since 2021, it has been awarded across all sections under a new title, which was revised again in 2024 and internationalised in 2025.

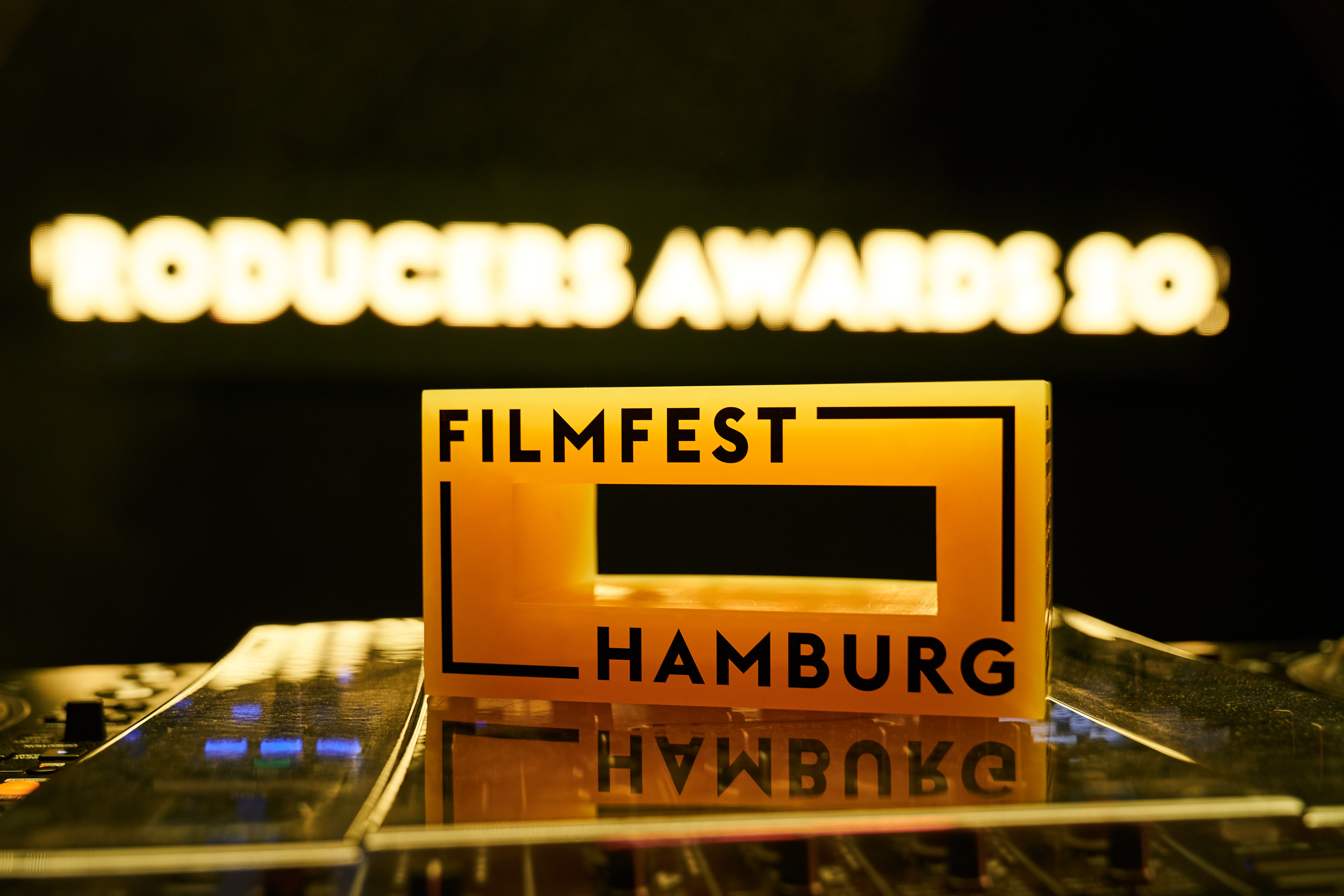
Producers Awards Trophy at the 2025 Awards Ceremony

The German co-producer of the winning film receives EUR 25,000, provided by Hamburg’s Authority for Culture and Media. Until 2021, the foreign co-producer of the same winning film also received a cinema grading package worth around EUR 15,000 from the Hamburg-based post-production company Optical Art.

Laureates

- 2014: Welcome to Karastan (Georgia, Germany, Russia, United Kingdom), German co-producer: Daniel Zuta, Brandstorm Entertainment AG (Frankfurt am Main); Georgian co-producer: Vladimer Katcharava, 20 Steps Production
- 2015: One Floor Below (Romania, Germany, France, Sweden), German co-producers: Christine Haupt and Alexander Ris, Neue Mediopolis Filmproduktion GmbH (Leipzig); Romanian co-producer: Dragos Vilcu, Multi Media Est.
- 2016: Scarred Hearts (Inimi cicatrizate) (Romania, Germany), German co-producers: Jonas Dornbach, Janine Jackowski and Maren Ade, Komplizen Film Berlin
- 2017: Arrhythmia (Russia, Finland, Germany); German co-producer: Eva Blondiau, Color of May
- 2018: Sibel (France, Turkey, Germany, Luxembourg); producer: Michael Eckelt (Riva Film, Hamburg), directed by Çagla Zencirci and Guillaume Giovanetti
- 2019: You Will Die at Twenty (Sudan, Egypt, Norway, France, Germany); producer: Michael Henrichs (Die Gesellschaft DGS, Cologne), directed by Amjad Abu Alala
- 2021: Lingui, The Sacred Bonds (Lingui, les liens sacrés) (France, Belgium, Germany, Chad); producer: Melanie Andernach (Made in Germany Filmproduktion), directed and written by Mahamat-Saleh Haroun
- 2022: Victim (Obeť) (Slovakia, Czech Republic, Germany); producers: Michael Reuter, Saar Yogev and Naomi Levari (Electric Sheep), directed by Michal Blaško; Special Mention: Holy Spider (Denmark, Germany, Sweden, France), directed by Ali Abbasi
- 2023: Sultana’s Dream (El sueño de la sultana); producers: Chelo Loureiro, Mariano Baratech, Fabian Driehorst, Diego Herguera, Isabel Herguera, Iván Miñambres; directed by Isabel Herguera; screenplay by Isabel Herguera and Gianmarco Serra
- 2024: Happy Holidays (Palestinian Territories, Germany, France, Italy); producer: Dorothe Beinemeier (Red Balloon); directed and written by Scandar Copti
- 2025: A Sad and Beautiful World (Lebanon, Germany, USA); producers: Georg Neubert, Katharina Weser and Jasper Wiedhöft (Reynard Films); directed by Cyril Aris; screenplay by Cyril Aris and Bane Fakih

=== Hamburg Producers Award German Cinema ===
Since 2018, the Hamburg Producers Award for German Cinema has been presented in the section Große Freiheit. The producer of the winning film receives €25,000. The prize money is provided by Hamburg’s Authority for Culture and Media

Laureates

- 2018: The Most Beautiful Couple; producers: Jamila Wenske and Sol Bondy; director: Sven Taddicken.
- 2019: Pelican Blood; producer: Verena Gräfe-Höft (Junafilm); director: Katrin Gebbe.
- 2021: No One’s with the Calves; producer: Jonas Weydemann; director: Sabrina Sarabi.
- 2022: Skin Deep; producers: Tobias Walker and Philipp Worm (Walker + Worm Film); director: Alex Schaad; screenplay: Alex Schaad, Dimitrij Schaad.
- 2023: A Good Place; producer, director and screenwriter: Katharina Huber.
- 2024: Vena; producers: Dietmar Güntsche, Martin Rohé and Svenja Vanhoefer; director and screenwriter: Chiara Fleischhacker.
- 2025: Phantoms of July; producer: Kirill Krasovski (Blue Monticola Film); director and screenwriter: Julian Radlmaier; Special Mention: Gavagai; produced by Sutor Kolonko and Ingmar Trost; director and screenwriter: Ulrich Köhler.

=== Hamburg Producers Award German Television Films ===
The Hamburg Producers Award for German Television Films is presented in the TV section TELEVISIONEN (former: 16:9). The producer of the winning film receives €25,000. Since 2014, the prize money has been endowed by the VFF, Verwertungsgesellschaft der Film- und Fernsehproduzenten mbH.

Laureates

- 2006: BurkertBareiss, producers: Gloria Burkert and Andreas Bareiss, for Ich wollte nicht töten; director: Dagmar Hirtz.
- 2007: Magnolia Filmproduktion, producer: Babette Schröder, for Kuckuckszeit; director: Johannes Fabrick.
- 2008: Bavaria Fernsehproduktion, producer: Astrid Kahmke, for Machen wir’s auf Finnisch; director: Marco Petry.
- 2009: Bremedia Filmproduktion, producer: Claudia Schröder, for Mörder auf Amrum; director: Markus Imboden.
- 2010: Wüste Film, producers: Ralph Schwingel and Stefan Schubert, for Etwas Besseres als den Tod; director: Nicole Weegmann.
- 2011: d.i.e. film, producer: Ulrich Aselmann, for Tödlicher Rausch; director: Johannes Fabrick.
- 2012: Aspekt Telefilm-Produktion, producer: Claudia Schröder, for Mörderische Jagd; director: Markus Imboden.
- 2013: -
- 2014: Filmpool Fiction, producer: Iris Kiefer, for Polizeiruf 110: Familiensache; director: Eoin Moore.
- 2015: Calypso Entertainment, producer: Brit Possardt, for Frauen; director: Jan Růžička.
- Special Mention: Ulrich Stiehm and Marco del Bianco, Jumping Horse Film, for In the Name of My Son; director: Damir Lukačević.
- 2016: Relevant Film Hamburg, for Apropos Glück; director: Ulrike Grote.
- 2017: Polyphon Film- und Fernsehgesellschaft Hamburg, producers: Hubertus Meyer-Burckhardt and Christoph Bicker, for Meine fremde Freundin; director: Stefan Krohmer.
- 2018: Relevant Film Hamburg, producer: Heike Wiehle-Timm, for Aufbruch in die Freiheit; director: Isabel Kleefeld.
- 2019: Sutor Kolonko, Cologne, producer: Ingmar Trost, for A Voluntary Year; directors: Ulrich Köhler and Henner Winckler.
- 2021: Fandango Film, producer: Jürgen Schuster, for Sleepless in Portugal; director: Florian Froschmayer; screenplay: Sathyan Ramesh.
- 2022: Producers at Work, producer: Christian Popp, for Das Wunder von Kapstadt; director: Franziska Buch; screenplay: Christoph Silber.
- 2023: Claussen + Putz, producers: Jakob Claussen and Ulrike Putz, for Sörensen fängt Feuer; director: Bjarne Mädel; screenplay: Sven Stricker.
- 2024: Bernd von Fehrn, René Jamm (Warner Bros.), Roxana Richters and Alexander Wadouh (Chromosom Film), for Von uns wird es keiner sein; director: Simon Ostermann; screenplay: Lucas Flasch.
- 2025: Peter Hartwig (Kineo Film), for Police; director: Buket Alakuş; screenplay: Laila Stieler.

=== Hamburg Producers Award German Series ===
In addition, since 2021 the Hamburg Producers Award for German Series has been presented. The prize, worth €10,000, is likewise provided by the VFF.

Laureates

- 2021: Warten auf’n Bus; producers: Ulf Israel and Reik Möller; director: Fabian Möhrke; screenplay: Sophie Decker, Oliver Bukowski.
- 2022: Reeperbahn - Special Police Unit 65; producer: Christian Beetz (Gebrüder Beetz Filmproduktion); directors: Georg Tschurtschenthaler, Carsten Gutschmidt, Ina Kessebohm.
- 2023: Füxe; produced by Katrin Haase and Oliver Arnold (U5 Filmproduktion); directors: David Clay Diaz, Susan Gordanshekan.
- 2024: Deadlines; producers: Martin Danisch and David Hadda (Turbokultur); director: Sonja Heiss; screenplay: Johannes Boss, Nora Gantenbrink, Sonja Heiss.
- 2025: Almania; producers: Kirstin Wille, Alexandra Bauermeister, Phil Laude and Ralph Schiller (DCM Pictures in collaboration with DiggiTales); director: David Gruschka; screenplay: Thomas Mielmann, Phil Laude, Melina Natale, David Gruschka, Pejwak Ghasryani.

=== Critics' Choice Award ===
Film critics and culture editors from German news magazines, online media outlets, radio stations and daily newspapers award the prize to a film from the programme that stands out for its original perspective. In 2018, the Prize of the Film Critics replaced the Hamburg Film Critics’ Award, which had been presented since 2004.

Laureates

- 2004: Brothers, Denmark. Directed by Susanne Bier
- 2005: Iron Island, Iran. Written and directed by Mohammad Rasoulof
- 2007: Control, Netherlands. Directed by Anton Corbijn
- 2008: Frozen River, USA. Written and directed by Courtney Hunt
- 2009: Cold Souls, USA. Written and directed by Sophie Barthes
- 2010: Pulsar, Belgium. Directed by: Alex Stockmann
- 2011: Take Shelter, USA. Directed by: Jeff Nichols
- 2012: Lore, Germany/Australia/Great Britain. Written and directed by Cate Shortland
- 2013: Metro Manila, Great Britain/Philippines. Written and directed by Sean Ellis
- 2014: Hope, France. Written and directed by Boris Lojkine
- 2015: Neon Bull, Brazil/Uruguay/Netherlands. Written and directed by Gabriel Mascaro
- 2016: Graduation, Romania. Directed by Cristian Mungiu
- 2017: The Florida Project, USA. Directed by: Sean Baker
- 2018: Our Struggles, Belgium. Directed by Guillaume Senez
- 2019: Dwelling in the Fuchun Mountains China. Directed by: Gu Xiaogang
- 2021: Vortex, France. Directed by: Gaspar Noé
- 2022: R.M.N. (Romania, France), directed by Cristian Mungiu.
- 2023: Do Not Expect Too Much from the End of the World (Croatia, France, Luxembourg, Romania), directed by Radu Jude.
- 2024: The Sparrow in the Chimney (Switzerland), directed by Ramon Zürcher.
- 2025: Second Victims (Denmark), directed by Zinnini Elkington.

=== The Political Film of the Friedrich-Ebert-Stiftung ===
The Friedrich-Ebert-Stiftung is awarding this prize at FILMFEST HAMBURG for the first time in 2013. Films aspiring to provide a political message are competing for the prize money of 10,000 euros (since 2025).

Laureates

- 2013: Fire in the Blood, India. Written and directed by Dylan Mohan Gray
- 2013: Manuscripts Don't Burn, Iran. Written and directed by Mohammad Rasoulof
- 2014: Children 404, Russia. Directed by Askold Kurov and Pavel Loparev
- 2015: Every Face Has a Name. Directed by Magnus Gertten
- 2016: Tadmor, France/Lebanon. Directed by Monika Borgmann and Lokman Slim
- 2017: The Wait, Denmark. Directed by: Emil Langballe
- 2018: On Her Shoulders, USA. Directed by: Alexandria Bombach
- 2019: Bewegungen eines nahen Bergs, Austria, France. Directed by Sebastian Brameshuber
- 2021: La Civil, Belgium, Romania, Mexico. Directed by: Teodora Ana Mihai
- 2022: How to Blow Up a Pipeline, USA. A Film by: Daniel Goldhaber, Ariela Barer, Jordan Sjol, Daniel Garber
- 2023: In the Rearview, Poland, France, Ukraine. Directed by: Maciek Hamela
- 2024: Sugarcane, directed by Julian Brave NoiseCat and Emily Kassie.
- 2025: Do You Love Me, directed by Lana Daher.

=== Arthouse Cinema Award ===
The Arthouse Cinema Award was established by the Conféderation Internationale des Cinémas d'Art et d'Essai (CICAE). Films that have a German distributor can be nominated. MOIN Film Fund Hamburg Schleswig-Holstein is contributing €25,000 (since 2025) to the award in support of PR measures by the German distributor.

Laureates

- 2008: 35 Rum, France/Germany. Written and directed by Claire Denis
- 2009: Soul Kitchen, Germany. Written and directed by Fatih Akin
- 2010: Nowhere Boy, Great Britain/Canada. Directed by: Sam Taylor-Wood
- 2011: Monsieur Lazhar, Canada. Written and directed by Philippe Falardeau
- 2012: Laurence Anyways, Canada. Written and directed by Xavier Dolan
- 2013: Venus in Fur, France/Poland. Written and directed by Roman Polanski
- 2014: Gett: The Trial of Viviane Amsalem, Israel/France/Germany. Written and directed by Ronit Elkabetz and Shlomi Elkabetz
- 2015: Mustang, France/Turkey/Germany. Directed by: Deniz Gamze Ergüven
- 2016: It's Only the End of the World, Canada/France. Directed by: Xavier Dolan
- 2017: The Rider, USA. Directed by: Chloé Zhao
- 2018: Woman at War, Iceland. Directed by: Benedikt Erlingsson
- 2019: Portrait of a Lady on Fire France. Directed by: Céline Sciamma
- 2021: Paris, 13th District, France. Directed by: Jacques Audiard
- 2022: Close (Belgium, France, the Netherlands), directed by Lucas Dhont.
- 2023: How to Have Sex (United Kingdom, Greece), directed by Molly Manning Walker.
- 2024: Universal Language (Canada), directed by Matthew Rankin.
- 2025: The Secret Agent (Brazil, France, the Netherlands, Germany); German distributor: Port au Prince Pictures; directed by Kleber Mendonça Filho.

=== NDR Young Talent Award ===
In 2012, the NDR Young Talent Award replaced the prize Die Elfe, which had been presented annually since 2008. The award, endowed with €5,000, honours directors presenting their feature debut or second directorial work at the festival.

Laureates

- 2008: Johnny Mad Dog, France. Written and directed by Jean-Stéphane Sauvaire
- 2009: Before my Eyes, Turkey. Written and directed by Miraz Bezar
- 2010: Oldboys, Denmark. Written and directed by Nikolaj Steen
- 2011: Avé, Bulgaria. Written and directed by Konstantin Bojanov
- 2012: Germania, Argentina. Written and directed by Maximiliano Schonfeld
- 2013: Short Term 12, USA. Written and directed by Destin Cretton
- 2014: Mary is Happy, Mary is Happy, Thailand. Written and directed by Nawapol Thamrongrattanarit
- 2015: Keeper, Belgium/France/Switzerland. Directed by: Guillaume Senez
- 2016: Cold of Kalandar, Turkey. Directed by: Mustafa Kara
- 2017: Beach Rats, USA. Directed by: Eliza Hittman
- 2018: Little Tickles, France. Directed by: Andréa Bescond, Eric Métayer
- 2019: A Son, Tunisia, France. Directed by: Mehdi M. Barsaoui
- 2021: Hive, Kosovo, Switzerland, Albania, North Macedonia. Directed by: Blerta Basholli
- 2022: Love According to Dalva (Belgium, France), directed by Emmanuelle Nicot.
- 2023: Shayda (Australia), directed by Noora Niasari.
- 2024: Diciannove (Italy, United Kingdom), directed by Giovanni Tortorici.
- 2025: Lucky Lu (Canada, United States), directed by Lloyd Lee Choi

=== Filmfest Hamburg Audience Award ===
The Filmfest Hamburg Audience Award is presented to the best film as chosen by festival audiences. Until 2019, the award was limited to films in the Eurovisuell section. It is endowed with €5,000 and was sponsored by Commerzbank from 2015 to 2021. In 2020, the award was expanded for the first time to cover the festival programme as a whole, excluding television films and MICHEL films. Since 2022, the prize money has been provided by the Hapag-Lloyd Foundation.

Laureates

- 2004: Dog Nail Clipper, Finland. Written and directed by Markku Pölönen
- 2005: Adam’s Apples, Denmark. Written and directed by Anders Thomas Jensen
- 2008: Welcome to the Sticks, France. Written and directed by Dany Boon
- 2009: Meet the Elisabeths, France. Directed by: Lucien Jean-Baptiste
- 2010: Oldboys, Denmark. Written and directed by Nikolaj Steen
- 2011: King of Devil's Island, Norway. Directed by: Marius Holst
- 2012: This Life, Denmark. Directed by: Anne-Grethe Bjarup Riis
- 2013: The Brats, France. Written and directed by Anthony Marciano
- 2014: Hallåhallå, Sweden. Written and directed by Maria Blom
- 2015: Nice People, Sweden. Directed by: Karin af Klintberg and Anders Helgeson
- 2016: The Day Will Come, Denmark. Directed by Jesper W. Nielsen
- 2017: It's for Your Own Good, Spain. Directed by: Carlos Therón
- 2018: Solsidan, Sweden. Directed by: Felix Herngren, Måns Herngren
- 2019: Psychobitch, Norway. Directed by: Martin Lund
- 2021: Little Palestine, Diary of a Siege, Lebanon, France, Qatar. Directed by: Abdallah Al-Khatib
- 2022: Amerikatsi (Armenia), directed by Michael A. Goorjian
- 2023: Heaven Can Wait – We Live Now (Germany), directed by Sven Halfar.
- 2024: Freiheit im Herzen – Lasst es uns eilig haben, menschlich zu sein (Germany), directed by Roxana Samadi.
- 2025: Love Letters directed by Alice Douard

=== MAJA ===
The award of the children’s and youth section has been presented since 2003. It was first awarded as Emil, renamed MICHEL in 2004, and has been presented as MAJA since 2023. Endowed with €10,000, the prize for the best children’s or youth film is sponsored by Hamburg cinema operator Hans-Peter Jansen. The winner is chosen by a children’s and youth jury from among all films in the international competition of the MICHEL Children’s and Youth Film Festival.

Laureates

- 2003: Das geheimnisvolle Fräulein C., Canada. Directed by: Richard Ciupka
- 2004: Station 4, Spain. Directed by: Antonio Mercero
- 2005: Der Schatz der weißen Falken, Germany. Written and directed by Christian Zübert
- 2006: Don, Netherlands. Written and directed by Arend Steenbergen
- 2007: Rot wie der Himmel, Italy. Directed by: Cristiano Bortone
- 2008: Hey Hey, hier Esther Blueburger, Australia. Written and directed by Cathy Randall
- 2009: Glowing Stars, Sweden. Directed by: Lisa Siewe
- 2010: Spork, USA. Directed by: J.B. Ghuman Jr.
- 2011: Ways to Live Forever, Great Britain/Spain. Written and directed by Gustavo Ron
- 2012: Stay!, Netherlands. Directed by: Lourens Blok
- 2013: Felix, South Africa. Directed by: Roberta Durrant
- 2014: The Contest, Denmark. Directed by: Martin Miehe-Renard
- 2015: Little Gangster, Netherlands. Directed by: Arne Toonen
- 2016: Fanny's Journey, France/Belgium. Directed by: Lola Doillon
- 2017: 1:54, Canada. Directed by: Yan England
- 2018: Supa Modo, Kenya. Directed by: Likarion Wainaina
- 2019: Psychobitch (Norway), Directed by: Martin Lund
- 2021: The Ape Star, Sweden, Norway, Denmark. Directed by: Linda Hambäck
- 2022: The Time of Secrets (France), directed by Christophe Barratier.
- 2023: Totem (the Netherlands, Luxembourg, Germany), directed by Sander Burger.
- 2024: LARS IS LOL (Norway), directed by Eirik Sæter Stordahl.
- 2025: Tales from the Magic Garden (Czech Republic, Slovakia, Slovenia, France), directed by David Súkup, Patrik Pašš, Leon Vidmar and Jean-Claude Rozec.

=== Albert Wiederspiel Preis ===
Since 2023, the Hapag-Lloyd Foundation has awarded the Albert Wiederspiel Prize for International Film Direction, endowed with €10,000. The award honors directors who, despite adverse political conditions in their home countries, courageously use their art to advocate for democracy and human rights. By establishing the prize and naming it after the former festival director of FILMFEST HAMBURG, the Hapag-Lloyd Foundation aims “to honour a dedicated festival organiser and film enthusiast”

=== Laureates ===
- 2023: Achilles (Iran), directed by Farhad Delaram
- 2024: April (Georgia), directed by Dea Kulumbegaschwili
- 2025: Honeymoon (Ukraine), Regie: Zhanna Ozirna

== Former Awards ==
=== Montblanc Script Award ===
Endowed with €10.000 sponsored by Hamburg-based company Montblanc. The award is granted as part of the "Northern Lights" section to a fiction or documentary film either produced or set in Hamburg or Schleswig-Holstein.

- 2007: Jan Hinrik Drevs for "Underdogs", Germany
- 2008: Srdjan Vuletic for "It's Hard to be Nice", Bosnia-Herzegovina/Germany
- 2009: Xiaolu Guo for "She, a Chinese", Great Britain/China/France/Germany
- 2010: Henrik Peschel for "Pete the Heat", Germany
- 2011: Marnie Blok for "Simon and the Oaks", Germany
- 2012: Kim Fupz Aakeson for "Mercy", Germany/Netherlands
- 2013: Katrin Gebbe for "Nothing Bad Can Happen", Germany

=== Foreign Press Award ===
- 2010: "Beyond", Sweden. Direction: Pernilla August
- 2011: "The Art of Love", France. Direction: Emmanuel Mouret
- 2012: "God's Neighbors", Israel. Direction and screenplay: Meni Yaesh

=== Sichtwechsel Film Award ===
Since 2017, the German Foreign Office honors directors who create films across national and cultural borders with a prize money of €10,000 .

- 2017: "The Future Perfect", Germany/Argentina. Directed by: Nele Wohlatz.
- 2017: "Amin", France. Directed by: Philippe Faucon
- 2019: Dark Suns, Directed by: Julien Élie
- 2021: 'Olga', Switzerland. Directed by: Elie Grappe
