= Little Palestine, Diary of a Siege =

2021 Syrian documentary film

- Arabic: فلسطين الصغيرة يوميات
- Directed by: Abdallah Al-Khatib
- Written by: Abdallah Al-Khatib
- Cinematography: Abdallah Al-Khatib
- Edited by: Qutaiba Barhamji
- Music by: Pierre Armand
- Production companies: Bidayyat for Audiovisual Arts, Lebanon, Films de Force Majeure, France
- Distributed by: Lightdox, Switzerland
- Release date: 21 April 2021 (Visions du Réel); International Feature Competition
- Running time: 89 min.
- Countries: Lebanon, France, Qatar
- Language: Arabic

Little Palestine, Diary of a Siege is a 2021 documentary film directed by Palestinian-Syrian filmmaker Abdallah Al-Khatib. The film documents everyday life in the Yarmouk refugee camp in Damascus during the Syrian civil war and the prolonged siege imposed on the area. Filmed largely by Al-Khatib himself, it records the experiences of residents struggling with hunger, bombardment, and isolation while attempting to maintain a sense of community.

The film premiered at Visions du Réel festival in Switzerland, won several awards at international festivals and received a theatrical release in France in 2022. Critics highlighted its intimate portrayal of civilian life under siege and its first-person perspective on the conflict.

== Background ==
Yarmouk Camp, located in the Damascus Governorate, was historically the largest Palestinian refugee camp in Syria and developed into a densely populated urban district. Before the outbreak of the Syrian uprising in 2011, it functioned as an important cultural and social centre for Palestinians in the country. As the Syrian civil war escalated, Yarmouk became caught between government forces and opposition groups. Beginning in 2013, Syrian government forces imposed a siege on the area that severely restricted food, medical supplies, and movement. Residents faced widespread shortages and deteriorating humanitarian conditions. After forces of the Islamic State entered the camp in 2015, Al-Khatib and many others had to flee and the camp was finally shut down in 2018.

== Synopsis ==
The film unfolds in a series of episodes drawn from footage shot during the siege of Yarmouk. Rather than following a single narrative, it presents fragments of daily life that collectively portray the experience of living under blockade. Residents organise communal kitchens, distribute limited supplies and attempt to preserve ordinary routines despite worsening conditions. Conversations, street scenes, and moments of humour appear alongside images of destruction and hunger. Through these encounters, the film reflects both the fragility and psychological resilience of the camp’s inhabitants. As the situation deteriorates, the camera captures the gradual transformation of the neighbourhood and the emotional toll on those who remain. The film ultimately serves as a personal testimony and a historical record of the siege.

== Production ==
The footage used in the film was recorded between 2013 and 2015 by Al-Khatib and his friends during the years of the battles and siege of Yarmouk Camp. He was working with the United Nations Relief and Works Agency for Palestine Refugees (UNRWA) on youth development and support programs. When a friend, who had been documenting the situation, left and handed him his camera, Al-Khatib began recording daily life inside the besieged camp. Using a small camera, he documented demonstrations, community initiatives and the strategies residents developed to cope with extreme scarcity. Because access to the area was restricted, filming was conducted informally, using lightweight equipment and with the participation of residents of the camp. Al-Khatib had sent the footage to friends abroad, and these recordings formed the basis of his documentary.

The documentary material was later edited and prepared for festival circulation with the support of international collaborators and production partners. Its structure preserves the immediacy of the original recordings while arranging them into a chronological narrative of life during the blockade. The production of the film received support by cultural organizations in France, the Sundance Film Festival Documentary Grant, the Doha Film Institute, Creative Europe MEDIA, Arab Fund for Arts and Culture, Al Jazeera and others.

== Release ==
Little Palestine, Diary of a Siege premiered on 21 April 2021 at the Visions du Réel festival in Switzerland, winning the Interreligious Award. The full-length documentary received a theatrical release in French cinemas starting in February 2022, attracting attention from French critics and cultural media. It is distributed by the Swiss company Lightbox. In Canada, the film was distributed by Cinema Politica, a non-profit media arts organization, for institution and educational licenses as well as for community screenings. Festival screenings introduced the film to wider audiences and positioned it among documentaries addressing the Syrian conflict and the experiences of civilians during wartime.

== Awards ==
- 2021: Interreligious Award at Visions du Réel festival, Switzerland
- 2021: Grand Prix and Prix des Étudiants at Festival 2 Cinéma 2 Valenciennes, France
- 2021: Press Jury Award at the War on Screen Festival, France
- 2021: Audience Award at the Hamburg Film Festival, Germany
- 2021: Best Documentary at the Guanajuato International Film Festival, Mexico
- 2021: Black Iris Award for Best Arab Feature-length documentary at Amman International Film Festival

== Reception ==
Critical reception emphasised the film’s direct and personal approach. Reviewers noted that the documentary avoids conventional narration and instead relies on the filmmaker’s presence inside the community. Commentators also highlighted the film’s depiction of solidarity among residents and its portrayal of everyday survival under extreme conditions. Several critics described it as an important visual record of the siege of Yarmouk. After its release in French cinemas in February 2022, the film received wide attention by French news media. It won several awards and was screened at more than 50 international festivals, including in Switzerland, France, Germany, Mexico, Japan and Italy.

Variety magazine called Al-Khatib's film "a love letter to his fellow citizens and their humanity amidst a profoundly inhuman situation" and continued:

Beginning phrases in pointed repetition with “The Siege…” the sense of entrapment gains the dimensions of a colossal yet invisible entity as Abdallah’s lyricism tries to makes sense out of the harrowing images as the audience witnesses a whole population slowly but steadily starve to death.

— Emiliano Granada, Variety magazine, 13 April 2021, Visions du Réel World Premiere ‘Little Palestine, Diary of a Siege’

== See also ==
- List of documentary films about war
- Chronicles from the Siege
- The Cave
- For Sama
- Last Men in Aleppo
