= Saja Kilani =

Canadian-Jordanian actress

- سجىٰ كيلاني
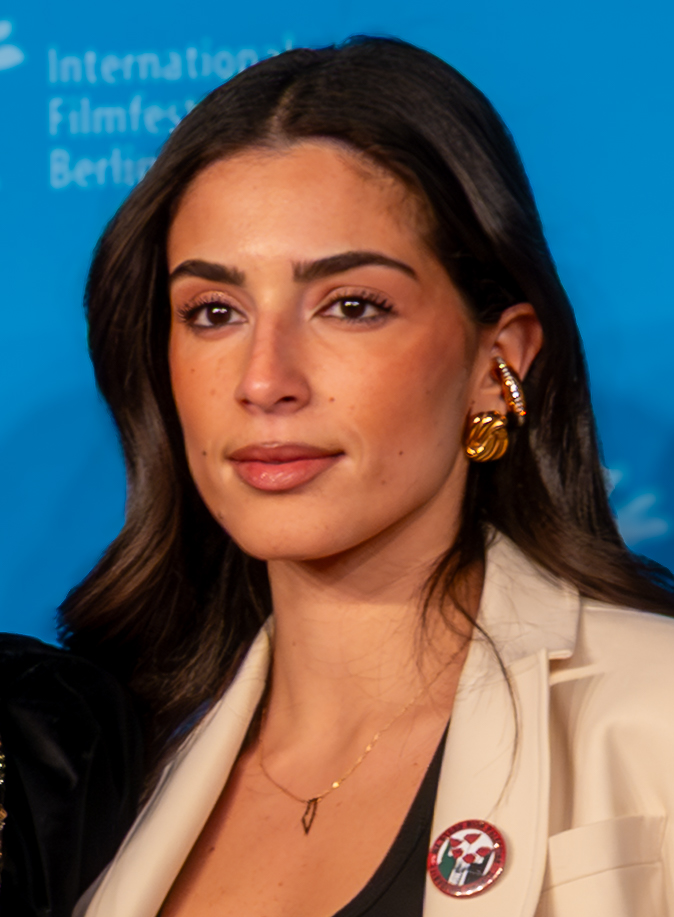
- Kilani at the 2026 Berlinale
- Born: January 14, 1998 (age 28); Amman, Jordan
- Citizenship: Palestinian-Jordanian, Canadian
- Occupation: Actress
- Years active: 2023–Present
- Known for: Acting
- Notable work: The Voice of Hind Rajab, Chronicles from the Siege

Saja Kilani (Arabic: سجىٰ كيلاني) is a Canadian-Jordanian actress of Palestinian descent. She gained international recognition for her leading role in the docudrama The Voice of Hind Rajab, which premiered at the 2025 Venice Film Festival. Her earlier performance in Simsim earned her the Best First Time Lead Actress Award at the Amman International Film Festival.

== Early life and education ==
Kilani was born to a Palestinian‑Jordanian family in Jordan and later lived in Canada, where she pursued higher education. From 2016 to 2020, she studied at the University of Toronto, completing an Honours Bachelor of Arts in international relations with additional minors in political science and theatre performance. She subsequently trained in acting at the Toronto Film School, earning a diploma in Acting for Film and Television. During her studies, she received the institution's Best Female Performance Award, recognising her work in student productions.

== Career ==
Kilani's first feature‑length screen role was in Simsim, for which she won the Best First Time Lead Actress Award at the Amman International Film Festival in 2025. Her breakthrough came with The Voice of Hind Rajab, directed by Tunisian film director Kaouther Ben Hania. Kilani portrayed Rana Faqih, a Palestine Red Crescent Society volunteer involved in the real‑life emergency call central to the film's narrative. The production premiered at the 2025 Venice Film Festival to a standing ovation and later received nominations at the Academy Awards, Golden Globes, and BAFTA Film Awards.

In 2023, Kilani won the Best Female Performance Award at Toronto Film School for her lead role in What's Your Emergency? She had written and directed this short drama film about a woman trying to run away from an abusive husband. In 2025, she was named to the Canadian Arab Institute's "30 Under 30", acknowledging her contributions to arts and culture within the Arab diaspora. Beyond her artistic work, she has been featured in fashion magazines, including collaborations with Marie Claire, Elle and Vogue Arabia.

In addition to her screen work, Kilani has performed spoken‑word poetry, presenting original pieces in live settings as part of her broader storytelling practice.

== Filmography ==
=== Film ===
Year	Title	Role	Notes
2026	Chronicles from the Siege	Leila	Lead role
2025	The Voice of Hind Rajab	Rana Hassan Faqih	Lead role
2025	Simsim	Lead	Debut feature; award‑winning performance
2023	Baq'a: The Open Valley	Translator	Crew role
2023	What's Your Emergency?	Lead	

=== Television ===
Year	Title	Role	Notes
2025	La revuelta	Herself (Guest)	1 episode

== Reception ==
An interview with fashion magazine Elle recalled that Kilani's portrayal in The Voice of Hind Rajab of Rana Faqih – the Palestine Red Crescent volunteer who stayed on the phone with Hind Rajab during the siege – is central to the film's emotional impact. The article highlighted Kilani's moral courage and the unforgettable effects of hearing Hind's voice while speaking to her in the role of Rana.

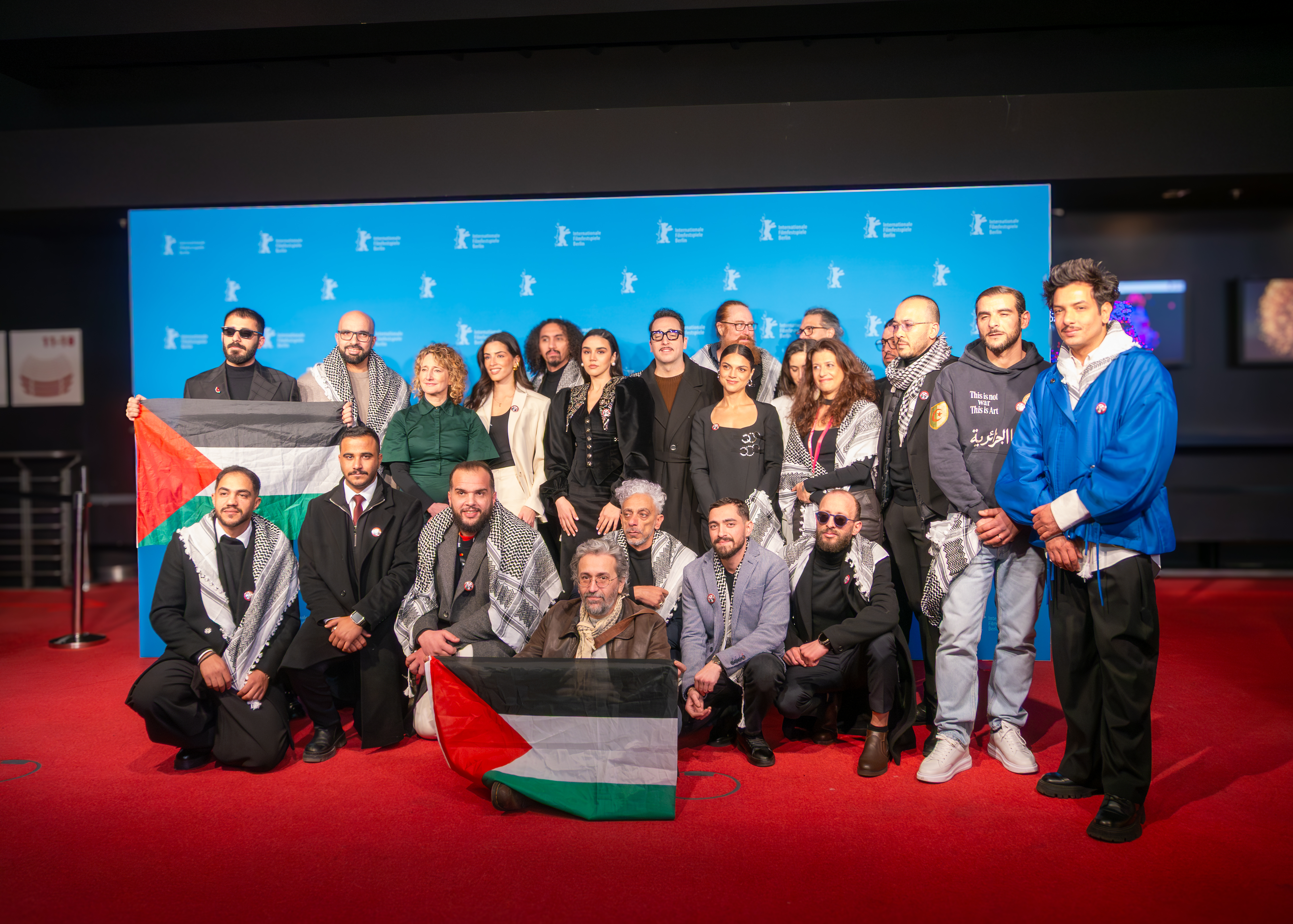
Chronicles from the Siege film crew with Saja Kilani standing in the centre at the 76th Berlin International Film Festival premiere on Feb.15, 2026

Speaking about The Voice of Hind with Grazia magazine, Kilani said that the real voice of Hind used in the film was "the backbone of the entire film and a constant reminder that you're not listening to something reenacted." Further, she concluded: "I hope Hind Rajab is one of those voices that reminds us of how alike we all are. [...] We live in a world where these stories are shadow banned and overlooked on social media. [...] A child should never be put in a position where they have to beg for survival."

In the 2026 drama film Chronicles from the Siege by Abdallah Al-Khatib Kilani played Leila, one of the leading roles. The film won the Best First Feature Award at the 2026 Berlin International Film Festival. In their review, Screen International magazine highlighted the "terrific energy in the acting" and singled out Kilani as Leila.
