= Yarmouk =

Yarmouk or Yarmuk may refer to:

== Places ==
- Yarmuk (river), the largest tributary of the Jordan River, in Jordan, Syria and Israel
- Yarmouk, Baghdad, Iraq
- Yarmouk, Kuwait
- Yarmouk Camp, a district in Damascus, Syria
- Yarmouk Military Industrial Complex, in Khartoum, Sudan

== Sports ==
- Al-Yarmouk SC (Syria), now Homenetmen Aleppo Club
- Al-Yarmouk SC (Amman), in Jordan
- Al-Yarmouk SC (Kuwait)
- Al-Yarmuk Al-Rawda, a football club in Yemen
- Al-Yarmouk (Libya), a football club

== Other uses ==
- Yarmouk Hospital, in Baghdad, Iraq
- Yarmouk University, in Irbid, Jordan
- Al Yarmouk University College, in Diyala, Iraq

== Other ==
- Battle of the Yarmuk, in the Arab–Byzantine wars
- Battle of Yarmouk Camp (disambiguation)
- Yarmukian culture, a Pottery Neolithic A culture of the ancient Levant
- Jarmuth, the name of two cities in Canaan
