= List of documentary films about war =

Documentary films about war include:

- List of World War II documentary films
- On Two Fronts: Latinos & Vietnam
- The Great War (documentary)
- The War (2007 TV series)
- The Invisible War
- The Unknown War (documentary)
- The Fog of War
- List of Afghanistan War (2001–present) documentaries
- The Civil War (TV series)
- Hearts and Minds (film)
- Stop Genocide
- List of documentary films about the Korean War
