= Chronicles from the Siege =

2026 drama film

- Arabic: وقائع زمن الحصار
- Directed by: Abdallah Al-Khatib
- Written by: Abdallah Al-Khatib
- Produced by: Taqiyeddine Issaad; Salah Issaad
- Starring: Idir Benaibouche; Nadeem Rimawi; Saja Kilani; Ahmad Kontar; Samer Bisharat; Ahmed Zitouni
- Cinematography: Talal Khoury
- Edited by: Alex Bakri
- Music by: Rana Eid
- Production companies: Issaad Film Productions; Evidence Film; 2 Princes Films
- Release date: 15 February 2026 (Berlinale)
- Countries: Algeria; France; Palestine
- Language: Arabic

Chronicles from the Siege (Arabic: وقائع زمن الحصار) is a 2026 drama film written and directed by Palestinian-Syrian filmmaker Abdallah Al-Khatib. It follows the life of Palestinian civilians trapped in a war zone during the siege of a fictitious small town.

The film had its world premiere at the Perspectives section of the 76th Berlin International Film Festival on 15 February 2026, where it won the Best First Feature Award.

== Synopsis ==
Set in a city isolated by war, the narrative follows several residents trapped inside a city surrounded by military forces, coping with shortages, danger and uncertainty as the siege continues. As food and basic services become scarce, the characters attempt to maintain routines and personal relationships while facing constant uncertainty. Their stories intersect as the siege intensifies, revealing different strategies to cope with fear, deprivation and moral dilemmas. This is shown through a sequence of five stories, each depicting a different mode of survival, with characters who emerge, disappear and reappear.

== Cast ==
- Idir Benaibouche as Saleh
- Nadeem Rimawi as Arafat
- Saja Kilani as Leila
- Ahmad Kontar as Mohammad
- Samer Bisharat as Youssef
- Ahmed Zitouni as Firas
- Wassim Fedriche as Walid
- Abdallah Al-Khatib as Cigarette Thief
- Emad Azmi as Fares
- Maria Zreik as Huda
- Omar Rammal as Jafra
- Hamzeh Mahadin as Qusai
- Nour Seraj as Farah
- Hayet Abu Samar as Nurs Hayet
- Majd Hijawi as Doctor
- Omar Almajali as Doctor Amar

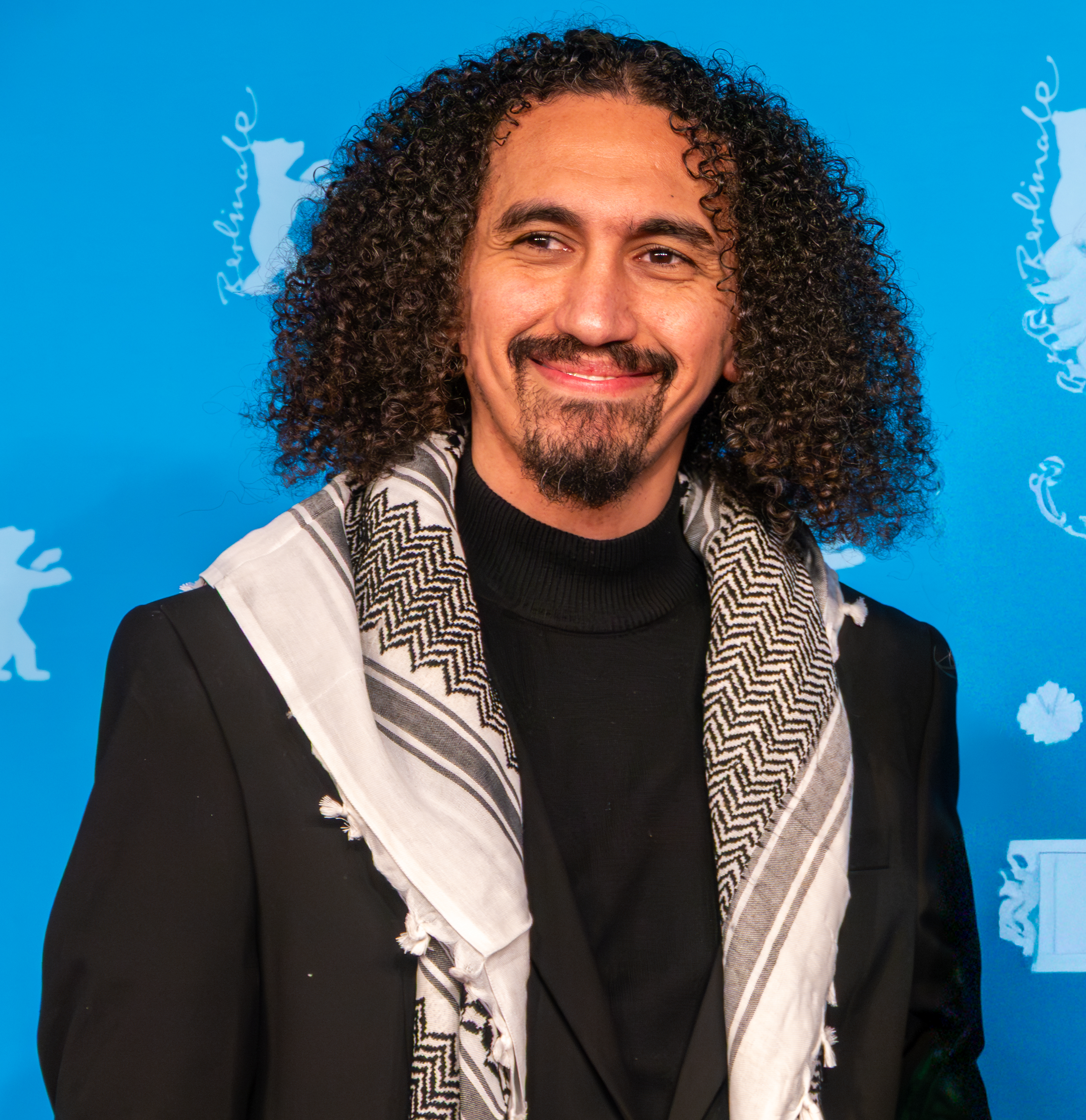
Abdallah Al-Khatib at the 76th Berlin International Film Festival

== Production ==
Chronicles from the Siege was co-produced by Franco-Algerian filmmakers Taqiyeddine Issaad and Salah Issaad representing Algeria, France and Palestine. The film continues thematic concerns present in Al-Khatib's earlier work about war, displacement and survival.

Al-Khatib, a Palestinian-Syrian filmmaker, was born in the Yarmouk refugee camp, a suburb of Damascus, in 1989 and later moved to Germany, where he lives today. He studied sociology at the University of Damascus and has continued his work after relocating to Germany. In 2014 he was recognised as "Peacemaker of the Year" by Greenpeace Germany, and two years later he received the Swedish Per Anger Prize for his human-rights activities. His first full-length documentary, Little Palestine, Diary of a Siege (2021), earned international attention and screened at festivals including Visions du Réel festival in Switzerland and the ACID section of the Cannes Film Festival. In 2023 he moved into fiction filmmaking with the short film Sokrania 59.

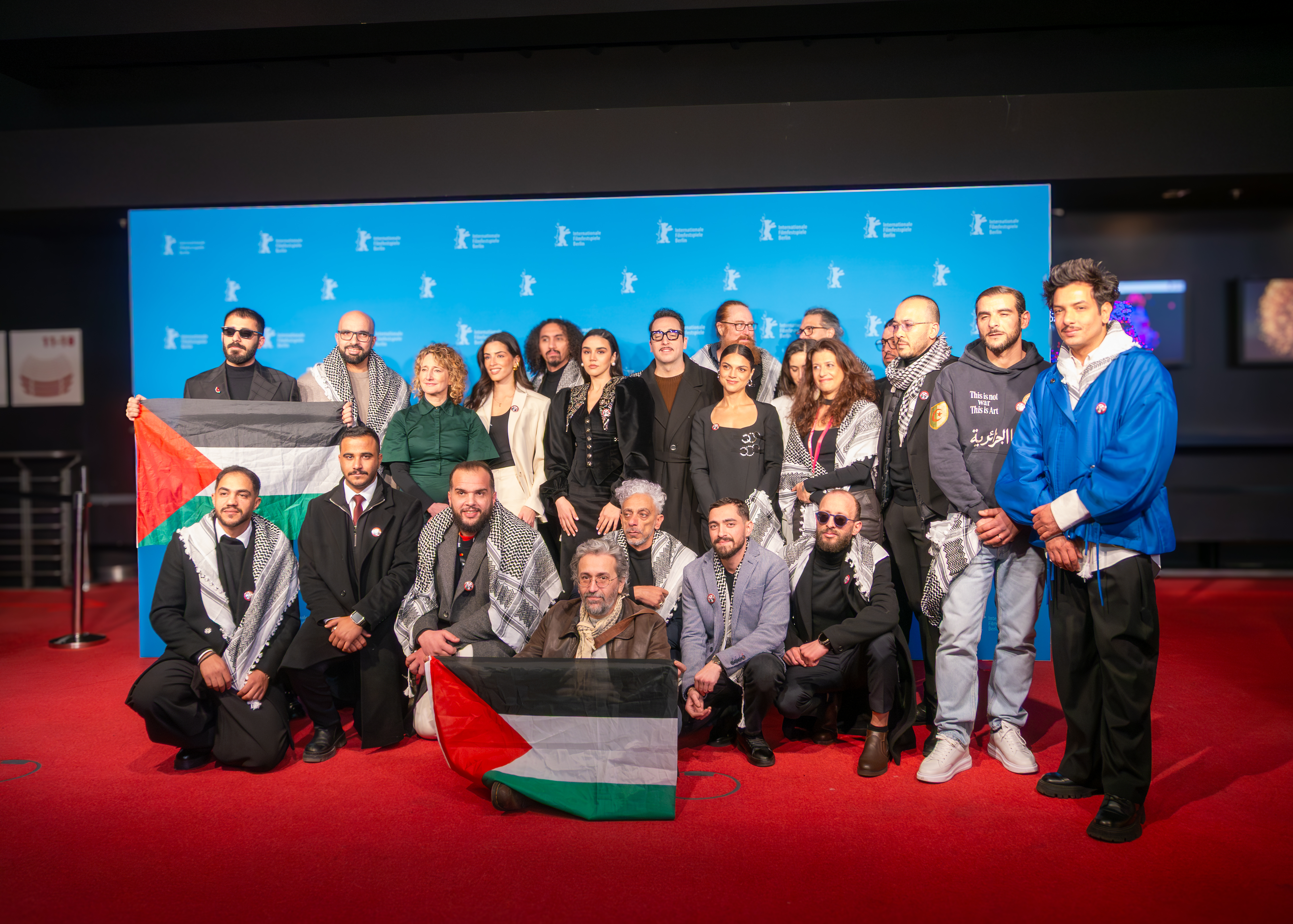
Chronicles from the Siege film crew with Festival Director Tricia Tuttle at the 76th Berlin International Film Festival premiere on 15 February 2026

== Release ==
Chronicles from the Siege premiered in the Perspectives section of the 76th Berlin International Film Festival (BIFF) on 15 February 2026. The Paris-based company Loco Films handled international sales prior to the festival screening, positioning the film within the European festival circuit. Following its premiere, the film was scheduled for additional festival screenings and international distribution discussions.

It was screened in the Dealing with the Past section of the 32nd Sarajevo Film Festival in August 2026.

== Response ==
=== Reactions to Berlinale speech ===
During his speech at the BIFF award ceremony, the filmmaker criticized the German and Israeli governments and their involvements in the Gaza War. This prompted Germany's Federal Minister for the Environment Carsten Schneider (SPD) to leave the ceremony. Similar speeches and public statements by filmmakers criticizing the festival's reluctance to allow political statements were reported in international media.

=== Critical reception ===
Critics have described the film as an unsentimental mosaic of survival under siege, capturing the closeness of life and death alongside scenes of bravery and the frailty of human behaviour. By concentrating on everyday life, as in food shortages, friendships and small acts of solidarity, the film attempts to present a human perspective on conflict rather than focusing on military action. Reviews have also noted the continuity between the film and Al-Khatib's documentary work, particularly his interest in personal narrative and memory in situations of political violence.

On the occasion of the film's screening at the 2025 Marrakech International Film Festival, Al-Khatib was quoted saying:

Siege doesn't kill directly; rather, it makes one lose the sense of life. It distorts memory, leaving one on the edge of madness, without memories for protection. [...] My goal is to present a deeper and more human portrayal, different from the usual war films about my region, which often depict its inhabitants as stripped of dignity and willpower.

Writing for the Spanish film portal otroscines.com, Diego Batlle gave the film a score of 3 out of 5, noting the "raw intensity, using a lot of handheld camera work, with an intensity, starkness, and visceral quality that are deeply moving." Film Fest Report called it "a poignant, vignette-driven meditation on the endurance and fragmentation of Palestinian life under siege, elevated by haunting performances", but also wrote that the script "never fully matches the gravity of its ambition".

Lebanese newspaper Al Akhbar mentioned in their Arabic review "the film insists that the siege is not a site, but an existential situation. This transition from documentary to fiction is not just a switch in tools, but an attempt to find a broader language" and added:

There are moments of sudden tenderness and solidarity that shine in the midst of darkness, matched by moments of mass collapse, where the sense of morality erodes under the pressure of hunger and fear, and small crimes and cracked psyche appear.

— Shafiq Tabbara, Al Akhbar newspaper, 21 February 2026

A review in SyriaUntold magazine noted the "brilliant cinematography and sound design". On a more critical note, it was called "a film of limited means, featuring one-dimensional characters with restricted screen time", where the characters are portrayed in "lighthearted, comedic moments addressing basic human needs."

According to Screen International, the film underscores the ongoing cycle of death and renewal, hinting that even in the harshest circumstances a glimmer of hope can still break through. After sequences of urgent, hand‑held long‑take imagery, the film ends with a striking shift: a calm, carefully composed ending that invites a moment of reflection after all the intensity and disorder that has come before.

Variety magazine highlighted the film's "moral dilemmas under the threat of oblivion", the final scenes "shot in enrapturing long takes" and continued:

This climactic collision is woven from several minor ethical tugs-of-war that rest on each character exhibiting both selfishness and altruism in various scenes, until their complicated humanity is placed under a harsh spotlight. The result is a particularly moving thematic conclusion nestled within the chaos: the innate understanding that each and every one of them, no matter who they are or what they've done, deserves to live.

— Siddhant Adlakha, 'Chronicles From the Siege' Review, Variety Magazine, 21 February 2026

=== Accolades ===
- GWFF Best First Feature Award at 2026 Berlin International Film Festival, including €50,000, shared between the film's director and producer

== See also ==
- Arab cinema
- Cinema of Palestine
