= Henrik Peschel =

German film director

Henrik Peschel, also known as Henna Peschel (born 1967 in Hamburg), is a German film director, screenwriter, cameraman and producer.

== Career ==
Peschel has been working in film since the 1990s. He taught himself film-making, starting with music videos for popular independent music acts like Frank Black (Ex-Pixies) who wrote the soundtrack for “Fight Club”. His first two short movies Rollo Aller! and Rollo Aller! 2, shot on Super-8 about two slackers succeeded to gain cult status in Hamburg, winning audience awards at two German film festivals.

Peschel later worked as cameraman for German directors Klaus Lemke, Wolfgang Büld and Fatih Akin. The TV documentary Punk in the Jungle, shot in Indonesia with him as director of photography was nominated for the prestigious German TV award Grimme-Preis in 2008.

After directing short and mid-length films, Peschel co-directed the mockumentary Dicke Hose with Miles Terheggen in 2009 to critical acclaim. His first feature film Pete The Heat (2009) won the Montblanc Script Award at Filmfest Hamburg in 2010. Peschel's second feature film Si-o-se Pol (2013) set in Algeria, Spain and France is his first directorial work with an international theme.

== Filmography (selection) ==
Director, script writer and producer:

- Si-o-se Pol (2013)
- Pete the Heat (2009)
- Dicke Hose (2009)
- Madboy (2008)
- Rollo Aller! 2 (1992)
- Rollo Aller! (1990)

Camera:

- Harrys Comeback (2010)
- Koffie To Go (2010) (TV)
- Pete the Heat (2009)
- Dicke Hose (2009)
- Madboy (2008)
- Die Glücklichen (2008)
- Punk im Dschungel (2007) (TV)
- 3 Minuten Heroes (2005) (TV)
- Träum weiter, Julia! (2004) (TV)
- Rollo Aller! 2 (1992)
- Rollo Aller! (1990)

Producer:

- Twisted Sisters (2006)

== Awards ==
- 2009 Audience Award Best Film at Unerhört Music Film Festival, Hamburg for "Dicke Hose"
- 2010 Montblanc Script Award at Filmfest Hamburg for "Pete The Heat"
- 2014 Festival Grand Prize at Arizona International Film Festival for "Si-o-se Pol"
- 2014 Special Jury Peace Award at Gothenburg Independent Film Festival, Sweden for "Si-o-se Pol"
- 2014 Kim Daejung Nobel Peace Film Art Special Award at Gwangju International Film Festival for "Si-o-se Pol"
- 2014 Special Prize for Human Rights Recognition at Oaxaca FilmFest for "Si-o-se Pol"
- 2014 Best Indie Feature at IndieCork Film Festival, Ireland for "Si-o-se Pol"
- 2015 Best Feature at Cardiff Independent Film Festival, Wales for "Si-o-se Pol"
- 2015 Best Foreign Language Feature at Orlando Film Festival for "Si-o-se Pol"
