= Battle of Yarmouk Camp =

Battle of Yarmouk Camp may refer to:

- Battle of Yarmouk Camp (2015)
- Battle of Yarmouk Camp (December 2012)

== See also ==
- Battle of the Yarmuk
- Yarmouk massacre (disambiguation)
