= Mustafa Abu Ali =

Palestinian filmmaker (1940-2009)

- مصطفى أبو علي
- Born: 1940; Maliha, Mandatory Palestine
- Died: July 30, 2009 (aged 68–69); Jerusalem
- Occupation: Filmmaker
- Notable work: No to a Peaceful Solution (1968); With Soul, With Blood (1971); They Do Not Exist (1974)

Mustafa Abu Ali (Arabic: مصطفى أبو علي; 1940 in Maliha, Mandatory Palestine – 30 July 2009 in Jerusalem) was a Palestinian filmmaker.

Abu Ali studied at the University of California-Berkeley in the 1960s before studying cinema in London, graduating in 1967. He is considered one of the founders of Palestinian cinema, and the Palestinian Cinema Association in Beirut in 1973, (re-established in Ramallah in 2004). Along with Sulafa Jadallah and Hani Jowharieh, he established the Palestine Film Unit (PFU)—which saw its primary task as "documenting the revolution and creating an archive of images of historical documents".

After the PLO's move to Lebanon after the events of Black September, the PFU was renamed the Palestine Cinema Institute and became one of the seven departments of the PLO's Unified Media. Abu Ali headed the department from 1973 to 1975. Abu Ali wrote four screenplays and directed more than 30 films, for which he won more than 14 awards, the most recent from the 2003 Ismailia Film Festival.

== Notable films ==
- 1968: No to a Peaceful Solution
- 1971: With Soul, With Blood
- 1973: Scenes from the occupation in Gaza (مشاهد من الاحتلال في غزة)
- 1973: A Zionist Aggression
- 1974: They Do Not Exist
- 1977: Tall el zaatar (تل الزعتر), co-directed with Jean Khalil Chamoun and Pino Adriano
- 1977: Palestine in the Eye

== See also ==
- Cinema of Palestine
