= List of documentary films about the Korean War =

Many documentary films have been made about the Korean War.

== Overview ==
- The Crime of Korea (1950)
- An Assault of Justice (1951–1952; in Korean)
- Korea: The Forgotten War (1987)
- Korea, after the War (1954)
- The War in Korea (1988)
- Korea: The Unknown War (1988)
- Our Time in Hell: The Korean War (1997)
- The Korean War: Fire and Ice (1999)
- Korean War Stories (2001)
- Korean War in Color (2001)
- The Korean War (2001)
- Korea: The Unfinished War (2003)
- Korea: The Forgotten War in Colour (2010)
- Fading Away (2012)
- Finnigan's War (2013)
- Keeping the Promise Alive (2013)
- The Korean War (2013)
- Fading Away (2014)

== Specific Contingents ==
=== Australia ===
- Kapyong (2011)

=== Belgium ===
- (in French and Dutch) Korea, the Belgian Legacy (2000)

=== Canada ===
- Test of Will - Canada in the Korean War
- In Korea with Norm Christie

=== France ===
- (in French) Crèvecoeur (1955)

=== Greece ===
- (in Greek) Greeks in Korean War (Οι Έλληνες στον πόλεμο της Κορέας) (2007)
- (in Greek) Greece during the Cold War 1950-1980 (Η Ελλάδα στον Ψυχρό Πόλεμο 1950-1980) (2008)

=== Luxembourg ===
- (in Luxembourgish, French, German, and English) Tour of Duty: Luxembourgers of the Korean War (Tour of Duty: Lëtzebuerger am Koreakrich) (2009)

=== Turkey ===
- (in Turkish) The Veterans of the Korean War (Kore Gazileri) (1951)

=== United States ===
- Cease Fire (1953)
- Korea: We Called it War (2002)
- Love Company: Reflections of the Korean War (2010)
- Uncle Sam Desired Our Presence: Arkansans in the Korean War (2010)
- Finnigan's War (2013)
- Keeping the Promise Alive (2013)
- The Battle of Chosin (2016)
- KOREA: The Never-Ending War (2020) from PBS

=== United Kingdom ===
- 20th Century Battlefields - 1951 Korea (2007)

== Prisoners of war ==
- They Chose China (2005)
- Keeping the Promise Alive (2013)

== See also ==
- List of films about the Korean War
