= The First Film of Palestine =

1911 film

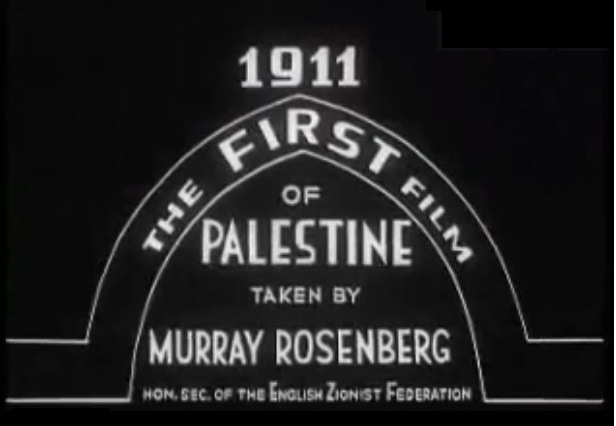
- Directed by: Murray Rosenberg
- Release date: April 1, 1911
- Running time: 29 minutes
- Country: Ottoman Palestine
- Languages: Silent; English intertitles

The First Film of Palestine is a 1911 documentary film made in Ottoman Palestine. The documentary is a short travelogue created by Murray Rosenberg, who served as Honorable Secretary of the English Zionist Federation. It is the earliest full film created in Palestine and the earliest Zionist film.

== About ==
The film is the earliest to have been shot entirely in Palestine, however, the French filmmaker Alexandre Promio, an employee of Auguste and Louis Lumière, had previously filmed a few short scenes in Jerusalem and Jaffa in April 1897. The Lumière brothers continued to send employees to film during the 1890s and 1900s. As in other Arab countries, early cinema in Mandatory Palestine was initiated by foreign visitors.

The documentary consists of short scenes filmed in Palestine. Rosenberg dedicated the film to Theodor Herzl. The film has been preserved by the Hebrew University of Jerusalem and the Spielberg Jewish Film Archive. Murray Rosenberg's film collection was donated to the Spielberg Jewish Film Archive in April 2005 by his nephew Cyril Levene and his wife Suzie Levene of Jerusalem.

== See also ==
- Cinema of Palestine
- Cinema of Israel
