= Battle of Yarmouk (disambiguation) =

The Battle of the Yarmuk or Battle of Yarmouk refers to a 636 CE conflict between the Byzantine Empire and Rashidun Caliphate near the Yarmouk River in Byzantine Syria.

Battle of Yarmouk may also refer to:

- Battle of Yarmouk Camp (December 2012)
- Battle of Yarmouk Camp (2015),

== See also ==
- Yarmouk massacre (disambiguation)
