= The Crime of Korea =

1950 film

The Crime of Korea was a 1950 propaganda film produced by the US Army Signal Corps mainly concerning the war crimes committed by the North Koreans.

== Plot ==
Crime of Korea opens with the narrator reminiscing about what Korea was like when he first arrived in 1945 for the Japanese surrender. He notes how well the Allies were received and how the Korean people were glad to finally be rid of their Japanese colonial masters, as well as "centuries of Russian and Chinese domination." Various public buildings are shown and the many activities for rebuilding the nation are described.

Flash forward to 1950, and the narrator is back in Korea as a war correspondent. The many buildings and public centers are seen gutted or destroyed and many Korean people are shown shot, with their hands tied behind their backs. The narrator gives background information about Communist war crimes, stating that it was monotonous that they found the same stories everywhere. But then, there was the crime of war, the crime of aggression that has sent so many people to their deaths needlessly.

The massacre shown illustrates the true nature of the aggressor, the North Korean invaders. "Everywhere lay the murdered dead". The field of pits of dead bodies shown in the film is from the Daejeon massacre. The film suggests the numbers of victims are 10,000 to 25,000 or more. The narrator tells us that "...perhaps the total figure right now is approximate, if that makes any difference." The actual number was over 7,000.

Other details that don't seem to make any difference to the narrator who vows that "we will make these war criminals (meaning the communists who are blamed for the massacre) pay." According to the historian Bruce Cumings, author of books on the origins and conduct of the Korean War, "this is a complete reversal of black and white done as a matter of policy". The Taejon massacre near Seoul was conducted by South Korean police while American military and intelligence people watched. This information was suppressed and the more revealing photos showing the true perpetrators classified until those photos were released in 1999. According to Cumings, the film follows an official policy to deceive viewers into thinking that the massacre was conducted by North Korean aggressors.

Shots are then shown of Kim Il Sung and the Communist leadership, as well as Communist rallies and parades, and the narrator speaks about the need to counter it to stop "other Koreas."

The final segment of the film exerts the home front to keep up production and buy war bonds for the war effort.

== Cast ==
- Humphrey Bogart as a war correspondent
