= Yarmouk massacre =

The Yarmouk massacre could refer to

- Battle of Yarmouk Camp (December 2012) – Part of the Syrian Civil War
- Battle of Yarmouk Camp (2015) – Battle of the Syrian Civil War
- Yarmuk massacre – Libyan massacre at Yarmuk, Libya.

== See also ==
- Battle of Yarmouk – 636 CE conflict between the Rashidun Caliphate and Byzantine Empire
- Battle of Yarmouk (disambiguation)
- Yarmouk Camp
