= Montaser Marai =

- منتصر مرعي
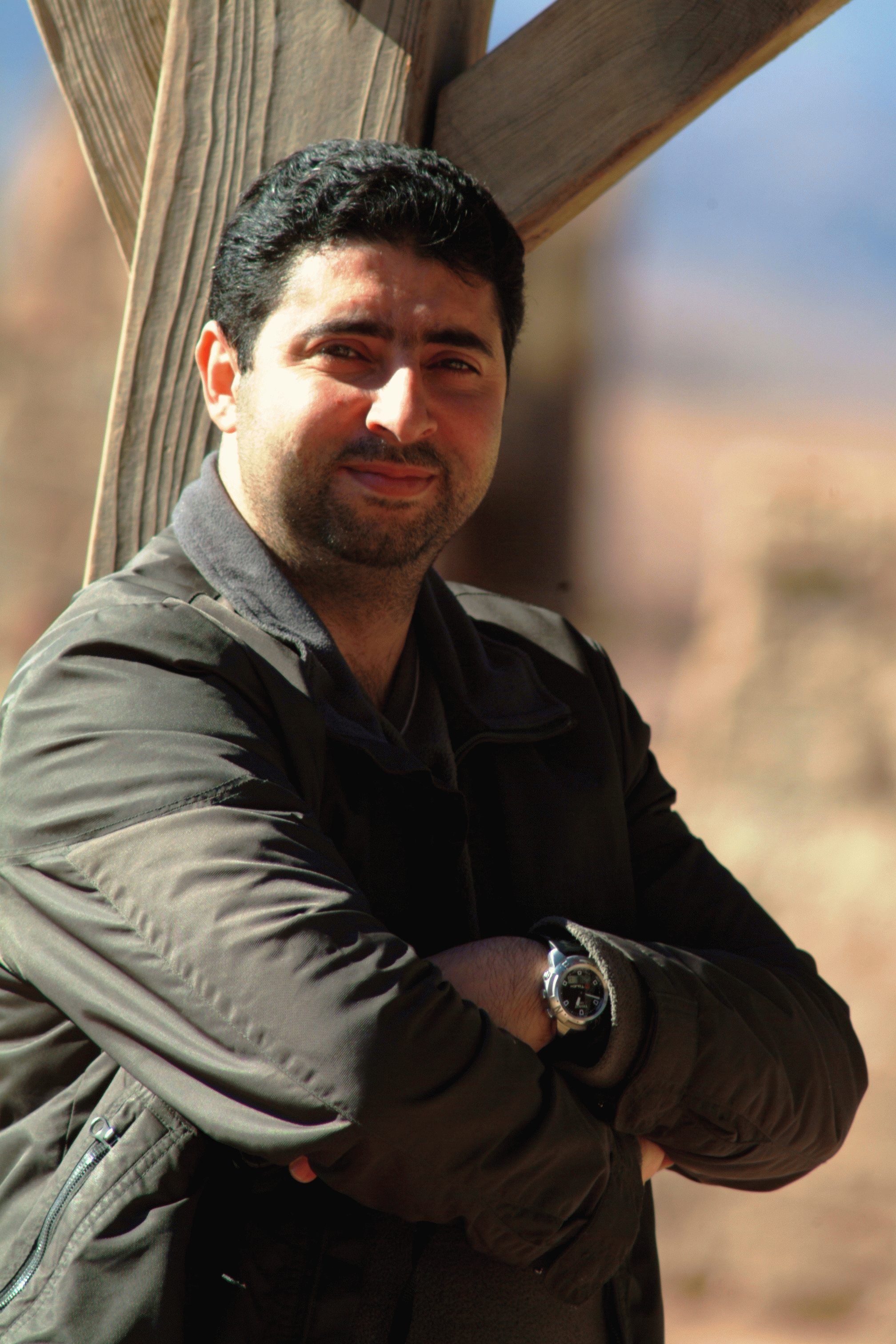
- Born: Montaser Marai; Amman, Jordan

Montaser Marai (Arabic: منتصر مرعي) is a Palestinian-Jordanian journalist and documentary filmmaker, who has worked for Al Jazeera since 2002.

Documentary Films

Film	Role	Company
The Thieves of Baghdad	Director / Producer	Aljazeera Channel
Killing the Witnesses	Director / Producer	Aljazeera
Road to Baghdad	Director / Producer	Aljazeera
Aljazeera: I see, I hear, I speak	Director / Producer	Aljazeera
Timbuktu: Jewel of the Desert	Director / Producer	Aljazeera
The Other Face od Africa	Director / Producer	Aljazeera
Youth in Japan: Crisis of Identity	Director / Producer	Aljazeera
Abu Musab Al Zarqawi	One of the Work Team	Aljazeera
