= Abdallah Al-Khatib =

Palestinian-Syrian filmmaker, screenwriter and human-rights activist

- عبد الله الخطيب
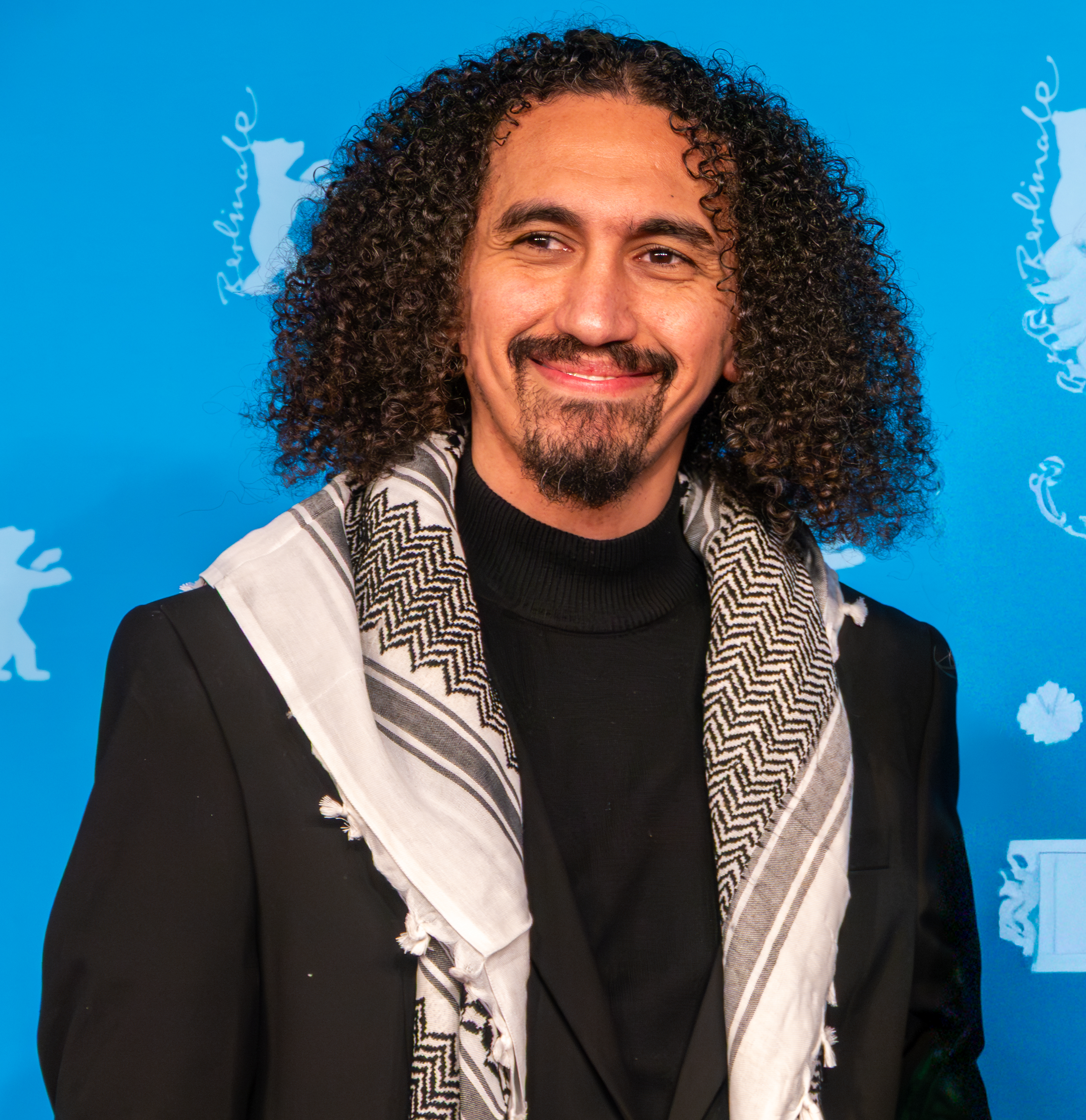
- Al-Khatib in 2026
- Born: 1989 (age 36–37); Yarmouk, Syria
- Occupations: Filmmaker, screenwriter, human-rights activist
- Years active: 2010s–present
- Notable work: Chronicles from the Siege; Little Palestine, Diary of a Siege
- Awards: Best First Feature Award, 2026 Berlin International Film Festival

Abdallah Al-Khatib (Arabic: عبد الله الخطيب) is a Palestinian-Syrian filmmaker, screenwriter and human-rights activist. He is best known for his films Little Palestine, Diary of a Siege and Chronicles from the Siege, both inspired by his experiences in the Yarmouk refugee camp of Damascus.

His work has explored war, displacement, and the lived experiences of civilians in conflict zones. In 2026, Chronicles from the Siege won the Best First Feature Award at the 76th Berlin International Film Festival.

== Early life and education ==
Al-Khatib was born in 1989 in Yarmouk, a Palestinian refugee camp and suburb of Damascus, Syria. He studied sociology at the University of Damascus. Before the escalation of the Syrian revolution, he worked with the United Nations on youth and volunteer initiatives and helped establish the humanitarian organisation Wataad, which coordinated relief activities during the conflict. During 2011 and 2015, Al-Khatib began documenting everyday life in the besieged camp, filming events that would later form the basis of his first feature documentary.

== Career ==
=== Documentary films ===
Al-Khatib first gained international recognition with Little Palestine, Diary of a Siege (2021), filmed largely inside the besieged Yarmouk camp. The film depicts daily survival under siege and was screened at numerous international festivals, including the 2021 Torino Film Festival, Yamagata International Documentary Film Festival, ACID Cannes and Visions du Réel festival. The documentary received several festival awards and critical attention for its first-hand account of the humanitarian conditions experienced by residents of the camp.

=== Fiction films ===
In the following years, Al-Khatib expanded into fiction filmmaking. His short film Sokrania 59 was produced in the early 2020s and screened in international programmes focussing on emerging Arab filmmakers. His first full-length feature film, Chronicles from the Siege, premiered in the Perspectives section of the Berlin International Film Festival, where it received the Best First Feature Award.

=== Activism ===
Alongside filmmaking, Al-Khatib has been involved in humanitarian and human-rights initiatives related to the Syrian conflict and Palestinian refugees. For his activism, he received the Swedish Per Anger Prize for Human Rights in 2016 and recognition from Greenpeace Germany.

After leaving Syria, Al-Khatib settled in Germany, where he has continued his work as a filmmaker and public speaker on issues of displacement, war, and human rights.

== Filmography ==
=== Feature films ===
- Little Palestine, Diary of a Siege (2021)
- Chronicles from the Siege (2026)

=== Short films ===
- Sokrania 59 (2023)

== Awards and recognition ==
- Peacemaker of the Year – Greenpeace Germany (2014)
- Per Anger Prize (2016)
- GWFF Best First Feature Award – Berlin International Film Festival (2026)

== Controversy ==
During his speech at the award ceremony, the filmmaker criticized the German and Israeli governments and their involvements in the Gaza War. This prompted Germany's Federal Minister for the Environment Carsten Schneider (SPD) to leave the ceremony. Similar speeches and public statements by filmmakers criticizing the festival's reluctance to allow political statements were reported in international media.

== See also ==
- Arab cinema
- Cinema of Syria
- Cinema of Palestine
