= Cinema City Nablus =

Movie theater in Nablus, West Bank, Palestine

Coordinates: 32°13′18.2″N 35°15′42.1″E

Cinema City Nablus was a movie theater in Nablus, West Bank, Palestine.

The cinema opened in 2009. Built at a cost of $2 million, it was in a new ten-story commercial in the city center which also included a shopping mall. According to National Public Radio, the theater featured a "shiny" lobby with a snack bar.

Former theater manager Farouk Masri told journalists that his family had decided that the political situation had calmed sufficiently to make building a modern movie house profitable in a city that had lacked one for many years. "It's been missing from Nablus, the cinema houses, been missing since the first intifada, over 20 years." He said that the new cinema was, "The talk of the street, I keep hearing ... Everybody is just excited, they're very positive about it, and they're very supportive". Among the excited children in the audience were many who had never seen a movie shown in a theater, only on the small screens of televisions and video players.

Relaxed checkpoint rules meant that Arabs from many towns could come to Nablus for shopping, dining and movies. The theater featured four showings a day of international films "including the latest Egyptian movies" in addition to private event hire.

Masri hailed the new cinema as "awe inspiring" but accused the international press of being "there-for-the-moment reporters" who seem "to have come down with a case of 'occupation isn't so bad' syndrome" as they focus on "the new thrills of the Nablus cinema" rather than on "the people's actual grievances".

Cinema City was closed in early or mid-2019 and converted into an indoor bowling alley called Bowling City, after more than US$200,000 in losses. The owner, Marwan Al-Masri, stated that the reason was the low audience turnout and the lack of regulation to safeguard the intellectual property rights for films.
