= Iron Wall (film) =

The Iron Wall
- Directed by: Mohammed Alatar
- Release date: 2007
- Running time: 52 min
- Language: Arabic

The Iron Wall is a 2006 documentary film about the establishment of Israeli settlements in the West Bank, which, the film argues, is a strategy for permanent occupation of the territory. Produced by the Palestinian Agricultural Relief Committees and Palestinians for Peace and Democracy, it was the "Official Selection" of the Al-Jazeera Television Production Festival.

The Iron Wall follows the timeline of the settlements and examines their effect on the peace process, featuring interviews with noted peace activists and political analysts, both Israeli and Palestinian, including Jeff Halper, Akiva Eldar and Hind Khoury. The film also covers the controversial construction of the Israeli West Bank barrier.

The Iron Wall features English, Arabic and Hebrew, and has English subtitles. It is named after an essay of the same name.
