= Palestinian literature =

Palestinian literature refers to the Arabic-language novels, short stories and poems produced by Palestinians. Forming part of the broader genre of Arabic literature, contemporary Palestinian literature is often characterized by its heightened sense of irony and the exploration of existential themes and issues of identity. References to the subjects of resistance to occupation, exile, loss, and love and longing for homeland are also common. In more recent years, self-identified Palestinians from Israel have published works in Hebrew.

== Arabic literature ==
=== Historical origins ===
Palestinian literature is one of numerous Arabic literatures, but its affiliation is national, rather than territorial. While Egyptian literature is that written in Egypt, Jordanian literature is that written in Jordan etc., and up until the 1948 Arab–Israeli War, Palestinian literature was also territory-bound, since the 1948 Palestinian expulsion and flight it has become "a literature written by Palestinians" irrespective of their place of residence.

The dispersal and appropriation of Palestinian books and archival materials following the 1948 war has been described by scholars as a significant episode of cultural loss. Between May 1948 and February 1949, an estimated 30,000 volumes were removed from private Palestinian libraries in West Jerusalem. Many of these works were subsequently incorporated into the holdings of the National Library of Israel in Jerusalem, in addition to collections belonging to Palestinian public institutions and schools. The library holds more than 8,000 volumes marked with the designation "AP" ("Abandoned Property"). The majority of these works are in Arabic, with others in English, French, German, and Italian, and they encompass subjects including Islamic jurisprudence, Quranic exegesis, literature, science, history, and philosophy.

=== Overview ===
Palestinian literature spoke to other causes of oppression and discrimination across the world. In his book, one of the foremost leaders of Palestinian literature and the person who coined the term Palestinian Resistance Literature, Ghassan Kanafani says, "In my stories I give my characters the freedom to express their own positions without reservation". This sense of international solidarity can also be found in Palestinian poets' work such as in Mahmoud Darwish's poem Cuban Chants, "And the banner in Cuba.. The rebel raises it in the Aures.. Oh a nation that feels cold", and in Samih Al-Qasim's poem, Birds Without Wings.

In the period between the 1948 Palestinian expulsion and flight and the 1967 Six-Day War, Palestinian Resistance Literature played a significant role in maintaining the Palestinian identity; forming a bridge between the two periods, which allowed the Palestinian identity to survive especially in the absence of armed resistance. In his book, Palestinian Resistance Literature Under Occupation, Ghassan Kanafani argues, "Palestinian resistance literature, just like armed resistance, shapes a new circle in the historical series which practically has not been cut throughout the last half century in the Palestinian life".

Since 1967, most critics have theorized the existence of three "branches" of Palestinian literature, loosely divided by geographic location: 1) from inside Israel, 2) from the occupied territories, 3) from among the Palestinian diaspora throughout the Middle East.

Hannah Amit-Kochavi recognizes only two branches: that written by Palestinians from inside the State of Israel as distinct from that written outside.She also posits a temporal distinction between literature produced before 1948 and that produced thereafter. In a 2003 article published in the Studies in the Humanities journal, Steven Salaita posits a fourth branch made up of English language works, particularly those written by Palestinians in the United States, which he defines as "writing rooted in diasporic countries but focused in theme and content on Palestine." However, Maurice Ebileeni argues that a fourth branch referring exclusively to anglophone literary works is not sufficient. Rather, Palestinian displacement both in Israel/Palestine and the diaspora have led to cultural and lingual diversification among Palestinians that exceeds experiences in Arabic- and English-speaking locations. Ebileeni suggest a polylingual branch that entails works by Palestinian authors – or authors of Palestinian descent – written in English as well as Italian, Spanish, Danish, Hebrew and several other languages.

Palestinian literature can be intensely political, as underlined by writers like Salma Khadra Jayyusi and novelist Liana Badr, who have mentioned the need to give expression to the Palestinian "collective identity" and the "just case" of their struggle. There is also resistance to this school of thought, whereby Palestinian artists have "rebelled" against the demand that their art be "committed". Poet Mourid Barghouti for example, has often said that "poetry is not a civil servant, it's not a soldier, it's in nobody's employ." Rula Jebreal's novel Miral tells the story of Hind Husseini's effort to establish an orphanage in Jerusalem after the 1948 Arab–Israeli War, the Deir Yassin massacre, and the establishment of the state of Israel.

As of April 2025, platforms such as We Are Not Numbers (WANN), mentoring young writers in Gaza, have published more than 1,500 individual stories and poems by hundreds of writers.

==== Novels and short stories ====
Susan Abulhawa's book Mornings in Jenin tells the story of a Palestinian family lost their homes during the 1948 war. In A Rift in Time, Palestinian writer Raja Shehadeh "explores how the stability of geography and the continuity of the land have disappeared from the life of Palestinians" through an examination of the life of his great-uncle Najib Nassar.

Short stories in Palestinian literature started with writers like Samira Azzam. Censorship of written material made short stories particularly popular under occupation for the relative ease in distribution. Author Atef Abu Saif has said that "Gaza was known as the exporter of oranges and short stories" in the 1980s and 1990s.

==== Poetry ====
Poetry, using classic pre-Islamic forms, remains an extremely popular art form, often attracting Palestinian audiences in the thousands. Until 20 years ago, local folk bards reciting traditional verses were a feature of every Palestinian town.

After the 1948 Palestinian expulsion and flight, poetry was transformed into a vehicle for political activism. From among those Palestinians who became Arab citizens of Israel and after the passage of the Citizenship Law of 1952, a school of resistance poetry was born that included poets like Mahmoud Darwish, Samih al-Qasim, and Tawfiq Zayyad.

The work of these poets was largely unknown to the wider Arab world for years because of the lack of diplomatic relations between Israel and Arab governments. The situation changed after Ghassan Kanafani, another Palestinian writer in exile in Lebanon published an anthology of their work in 1966.

The work of Nathalie Handal, an award-winning poet, playwright, and writer, appeared in numerous anthologies and magazines. She has been translated into twelve languages. She has promoted international literature through translation, research, and the edited The Poetry of Arab Women, an anthology that introduced several Arab women poets to a wider audience in the west.

Palestinian poets often write about the common theme of a strong affection and sense of loss and longing for a lost homeland. In a poem about the Israeli bombing of Lebanon, published in the Palestinian literary magazine al-Karmel, Mahmoud Darwish wrote:

Smoke rises from me, I reach out a hand to collect my limbs scattered from so many bodies, besieged from land and sky and sea and language. The last plane has taken off from Beirut airport and left me in front of the screen to watch
with millions of viewers
the rest of my death
As for my heart, I see it roll, like a pine cone, from Mount Lebanon, to Gaza.

During the Gaza War, Batool Abu Akleen published her poems, reflecting intimate imagery that transforms the experience of genocide into personal testimony. She was named Modern Poetry in Translation's "Poet in Residence" in 2024 and has received recognition for both her poetry and translation work.

==== Hakawati ====
The art of story telling was for a long time part of the cultural life in Arabic speaking countries of the Middle East. The tradition of "Tales From a Thousand and One Nights" is not an exception. In each small town or village of Palestine, itinerant story tellers called hakawati would visit and tell folk stories they knew, often in teahouses. The tales of the hakawati, once told for all ages, are now sometimes emerging from the Palestinian diaspora as children's books.

==== Hikaye ====
Palestinian hikaye is a form of oral literature created, performed and preserved by women. Usually narrated in winter, the performers are usually older women, who tell them to younger women and children. Some versions of hikaye were published in the 1989 volume Speak Bird, Speak Again. In 2008 they were inscribed by UNESCO to their list of intangible cultural heritage.

== Hebrew literature ==
In Israeli and Arabic literary scholarship, a distinct though relatively small body of Palestinian writers are identified as authors who produce original literary works in the Hebrew language. These writers are mainly Palestinian citizens of Israel whose choice of Hebrew reflects complex cultural, linguistic, and political dynamics, often engaging with themes of identity, belonging, and minority experience within a Hebrew-dominant literary space. A foundational figure is Anton Shammas, an Israeli Arab writer whose Hebrew works in the late 1970s and 1980s, including early poetry and prose collections, are often cited as among the earliest sustained Palestinian literary expressions in Hebrew. Another prominent name is Sayed Kashua, whose debut novel Dancing Arabs (Aravim Rokdim), originally written in Hebrew and published in 2002, explores the life of a Palestinian Israeli navigating between Palestinian identity and incorporation into Israeli society.

== See also ==
- Palestine Festival of Literature
- Palestinian art
- Palestinian handicrafts
- Palestinian music
- Palestinian National Theatre

== Additional references ==
- Alvarado-Larroucau, Carlos, Écritures palestiniennes francophones; Quête d'identité en espace néocolonial, Paris, Éditions L'Harmattan, coll. «Critiques littéraires», 2009. (in French) ISBN 978-2-296-08579-4
- Abu-Remaileh, Refqa, Documenting Palestinian Presence: A Study of the Novels of Emile Habibi and the Films of Elia Suleiman. (Dissertation) University of Oxford, 2010.
