= Aviya =

Aviya may refer to:

- Aviya, a form of the first name Abijah
- Aviya Kopelman (b. 1978), Israeli classical composer
