= Ministry of Jerusalem Affairs =

Ministry of Jerusalem Affairs may refer to:

- Ministry of Jerusalem Affairs (Israel)
- Ministry of Jerusalem Affairs (Palestine)
