= Rana's Wedding =

2002 film

- Poster
- Directed by: Hany Abu-Assad
- Written by: Ihab lamy and Liana Badr
- Produced by: Bero Beyer and George Ibrahim
- Starring: Clara Khoury, Khalifa Natour and Ismael Dabbagh
- Cinematography: Brigit Hillenius
- Edited by: Denise Janzee
- Music by: Mariecke van der Linden and Bashar Abd Rabou
- Distributed by: Arab Film Distribution
- Release date: 2002
- Running time: 86 minutes
- Country: Palestine
- Language: Arabic
- Box office: $10,604 (US)

Rana's Wedding, also known as Jerusalem, Another Day (Arabic, القدس في يوم آخر), is a Palestinian film released in 2002. It was produced in partnership with the Netherlands and funded by the Palestinian Film Foundation. The film was directed by Palestinian director Hany Abu-Assad in Jerusalem. Rana's Wedding presents the Palestinian-Israeli conflict through the metaphor of a couple's marriage drama.

== Plot ==
Rana is a 17-year-old girl living in Palestine. Due to the chaotic working conditions in Palestine, her father decides to relocate to Egypt to try to maintain an income to support his family. Rana wakes up one day to find a letter from her father informing her about his decision and providing her with two choices: either travel with him to Egypt and carry on with her education there under his watchful eye, or stay in Palestine and marry, to make sure that someone is taking care of her in his absence. Her father will only allow her to marry one of the men he lists in his letter and she has only 10 hours in which to choose before her father departs for Egypt.

Rana is shocked and disappointed with the options and decides to run away from home in search of her lover Khalil. Her father does not approve of Khalil and Khalil is not included in the list of people she can marry. After hours of searching, she finally discovers his location and rushes to him, finding him in the theatre as he works on directing one of his plays.

Rana asks Khalil to marry her and presses him for a decision so that they can be married before her father leaves. They find a sheikh prepared to marry them and drive to her father's house to ask for his approval. Rana's father can find no excuse under Islamic law to prevent the wedding and unwillingly concedes.

Tension rises as Rana's father prepares to leave for Egypt and the sheikh has still not arrived to perform the ceremony. Rana discovers that the sheikh is stuck at a roadblock and she, Khalil, and her father drive out to find him. They exchange vows in the car and the film ends with a celebration on the streets of Jerusalem.

The closing words come from Palestinian poet Mahmoud Darwish:

Here on the slopes before sunset and at the gun-mouth of time,

Near orchards deprived of their shadows,
We do what prisoners do,
What the unemployed do:

We nurture hope.

— Mahmoud Darwish

== Cast ==
- Clara Khoury as Rana
- Khalifa Natour as Khalil
- Ismael Dabbagh as Ramzy
- Zuher Fahoum as Father
- Bushra Karaman as Grandmother

== Production ==
The film was shot in East Jerusalem, Ramallah, Palestine. Produced in collaboration with the Netherlands and funded by the Palestinian Film Foundation, it was filmed during a critical time in the early months of the Second Palestinian Intifada. In an interview with journalist Sabah Haider, Hany Abu-Assad discusses the challenges he faced when producing the film: "For sure the intifada influenced the production because at the end of the film, reality is stronger than fiction. The occupation, the checkpoints — you don’t want them to interfere with your story but the ugliness of occupation influenced the look of film. As much as you might not want occupation to influence the making of the film, at the end it does influence it."

== Reception ==
=== Box office ===
According to the website Box Office Mojo, in 2003 Rana's Wedding was ranked in the top 50 wedding genre films produced in that year, and received a world ranking of 1108 in foreign films. The film earned $10,604 after in its first year of release. It was selected for screening in the International Critics' Week section at the 2002 Cannes Film Festival.

=== Critical response ===
The film Rana's Wedding received largely positive reviews on its release. Rotten Tomatoes shows an approval rating of 93% based on reviews from 28 critics, with an average rating of 7.2/10. The website's critical consensus states: "A poignant drama that offers a look at what it is like to live in occupied Palestine." On Metacritic, the film has a score of 71 out of 100 based on reviews from 19 critics.

=== Awards and nominations ===
Awards

- Winner of the Grand Prize and Best Actress (Clara Khoury) at the Cologne Mediterranean Film Festival (2002).
- Best Actress (Clara Khoury) at the Marrakech International Film Festival (2002).
- Winner of the Golden Antigone Award at Montpellier Mediterranean Film Festival (2002)
- Winner of the Golden Anchor Award at Haifa International Film Festival (2003)
- Winner of the Nestor Almendros Award for courage in film making at the Human Rights Watch International Film Festival (2003)

Nominations

- Nominated for the Golden star award at Marrakech International Film Festival (2002)
- Nominated for the Golden Alexander Award at the Thessaloniki Film Festival (2002)
- Nominated for Best Film at the Buenos Aires International Festival of Independent Cinema (2003)
- Nominated for the Golden Dolphin award at Festróia - Tróia International Film Festival (2003)

== Legacy ==
- Rana’s Wedding is considered to be the first film that approaches and showcases the Palestinian-Israeli conflict. It was one of the first Arabic films to be screened at the Cannes Film Festival, and one of the first Palestinian films shown at the festival.

== See also ==
- Paradise now
- Cinema of Palestine
- Cinema Jenin
- Palestinian National Theatre
- Al-Kasaba Theatre
