= Clara Khoury =

Palestinian-American actress (born 1976)

- كلارا خوري
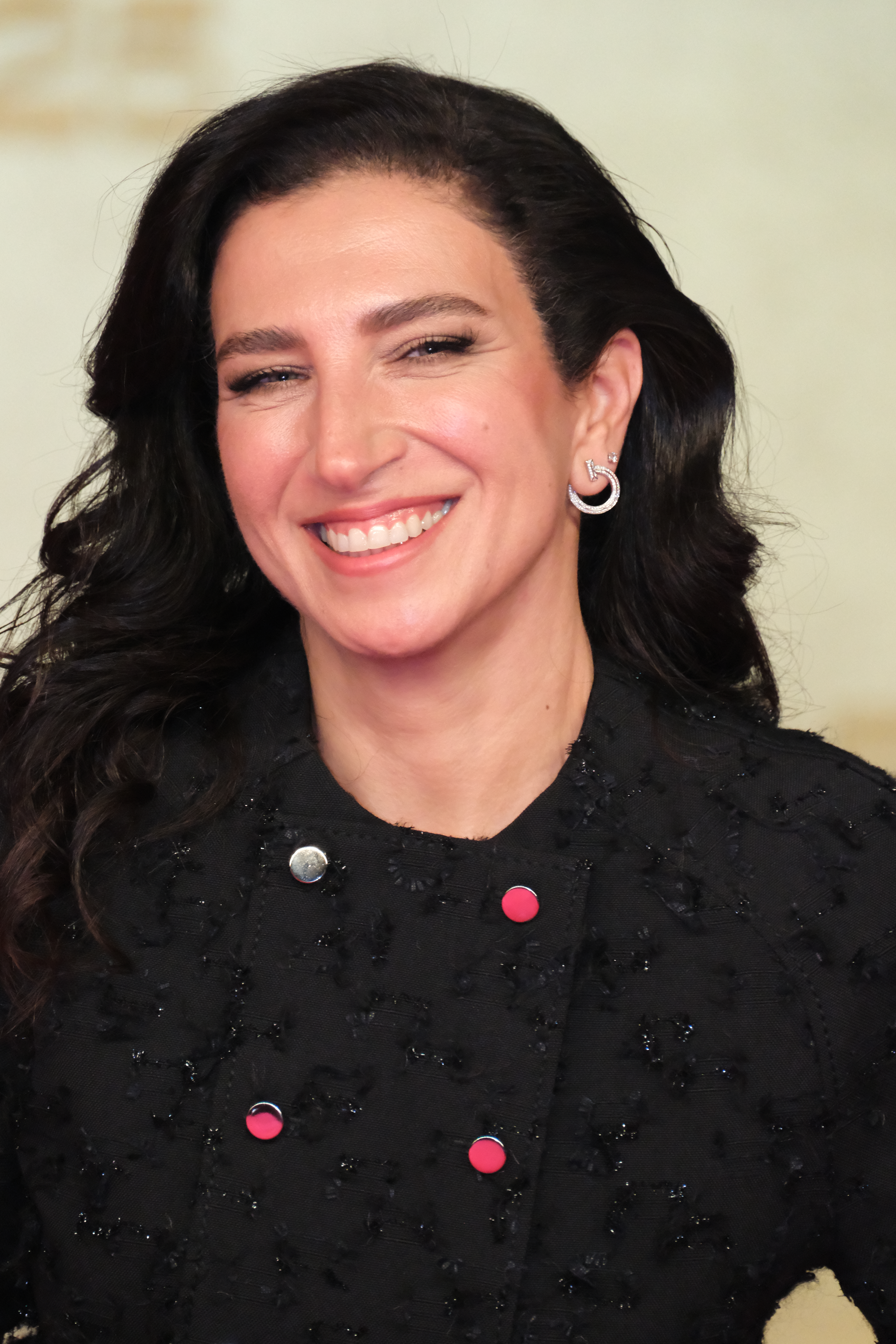
- Born: 29 December 1976 (age 49); Haifa, Israel
- Occupation: Actress
- Years active: 1998–present
- Father: Makram Khoury
- Relatives: Jamil Khoury (brother); Roula Khoury (sister)
- Website: clarakhoury.com

Clara Khoury (Arabic: كلارا خوري, romanized: Klārā Khūrī, born 29 December 1976) is a Palestinian–American actress. She works in film, television and theater. She grew up in Haifa, and now lives in California, United States.

== Biography ==
Clara Khoury was born to a family of Palestinians in Haifa, Israel. She is the daughter of the award-winning actor Makram Khoury. Her family is Greek Orthodox Christian. She studied cinema at the Open University in Tel Aviv and drama at the Beit Zvi Acting School. Her brother Jamil Khoury is an actor and composer, while her sister Roula Khoury is an art curator.

== Acting career ==
Khoury has worked in a variety of roles on stage including the lead in Antigone by Jean Anouilh, The Glass Menagerie by Tennessee Williams and Salome by Oscar Wilde, in Arabic as well as in Hebrew and English. Her television work includes the series Parashat Hashavua, written by Ari Folman, and Arab Labor written by Sayed Kashua.

She made her big screen debut in 2002 in Rana's Wedding by Hany Abu-Assad (director of the Oscar-nominated Paradise Now) which premiered in the International Critics' Week section at the 55th Cannes Film Festival representing Palestine.

In 2005 she gained international recognition for her role in The Syrian Bride, portraying a young Druze woman who risks losing her family by entering an arranged marriage with a Syrian national. Directed by Eran Riklis (Lemon Tree) the film won the Audience Prize at the Locarno Film Festival.

Khoury starred in Lipstikka, a British / Israeli psychological drama by Jonathan Sagall, in competition at the Berlinale 2011. At the Al-Midan Arabic Theater in Haifa she starred in Juliano Mer-Khamis's adaptation of Roman Polanski's 1994 movie Death and The Maiden after the play by Chilean playwright Ariel Dorfman.

Her film repertoire includes Hiam Abbas’s Inheritance and Susan Youssef's Marjoun and the Flying Headscarf and Amsterdam to Anatolia on Netflix.

Khoury starred in the acclaimed mini series Baghdad Central for Channel 4 and Hulu and the series Homeland for Showtime.

In 2024, Khoury starred in the award-winning Palestinian feature film Thank You for Banking with Us, directed by Leila Abbas. The film premiered at the British Film Institute (BFI) and earned Khoury the Best Actress award at the Casablanca International Film Festival for her portrayal of Maryam Casablanca Festival. In 2025, she participated in Don't Be Long Little Bird, directed by Reem Joubran.

In 2025, Khoury starred in The Voice of Hind Rajab directed by Kaouther Ben Hania, which had its world premiere at the 82nd Venice International Film Festival. and Sink directed by Zain Duraie, which will premiere at the 2025 Toronto International Film Festival in the Discovery section.

== Filmography ==
=== Film ===
Year	Film	Notes
2002	Rana's Wedding	
2004	The Syrian Bride	
2006	Forgiveness	
2007	Liebesleben	
2008	Body of Lies	
2009	Dusty Road	
2011	Lipstikka	
2012	The Inheritance	
2019	Marjoun and the Flying Headscarf	
2019	Amsterdam to Anatolia	
2019	A Letter to a Friend in Gaza	
2020	Laila in Haifa	
2025	Sink	
2025	The Voice of Hind Rajab	

=== Theater ===
- Death and the Maiden—Paulina - (2010) Juliano Mer-Khamis
- Hebron, Khalil / Rania -- (2007) Oded Kotler
- Period of Adjustment—Isabel - (2006) Dedi Baron
- Cruel and Tender—Laela - (2005) Artur kogan
- Salome—Salome - (2005) Ofira Henig
- The Glass Menagerie—Loura - (2004) Muneer Bakri
- Gilgamesh, He is not Dead—Houmbaba - (2003) Francois Abuo-Salem
- Anigone—Antigone - (2002) Gdalya Besser
- Tiger at the Gate—Andromaque - (2002) Ido Ricklin

=== Television ===
- On Any Saturday - created by Anat Asulin, Rani Blair
- Kavanot Tovot - director Uri Barbash
- Arab Labor - written by Sayed Kashua
- Maktub - director Avi Mussel
- Papadizi - director Ori Sivan
- The Police Man - director Ram Levi
- Homeland - created by Gideon Raff, Howard Gordon, and Alex Gansa
- Baghdad Central - written by Stephen, director Alice Troughton

== Awards and recognition ==
Khoury won two Israeli Academy of Film and Television prizes for best actress as Bushra in the television sitcom Arab Labor. She won the Best Actress Award for her leading role in Rana's wedding at the Marrakech International Film Festival.

== See also ==
- Theater of Israel
- Cinema of Israel
- Television of Israel
- Cinema of Palestine
