= Hany Abu-Assad =

Palestinian and Dutch filmmaker (born 1961)

- هاني أبو أسعد
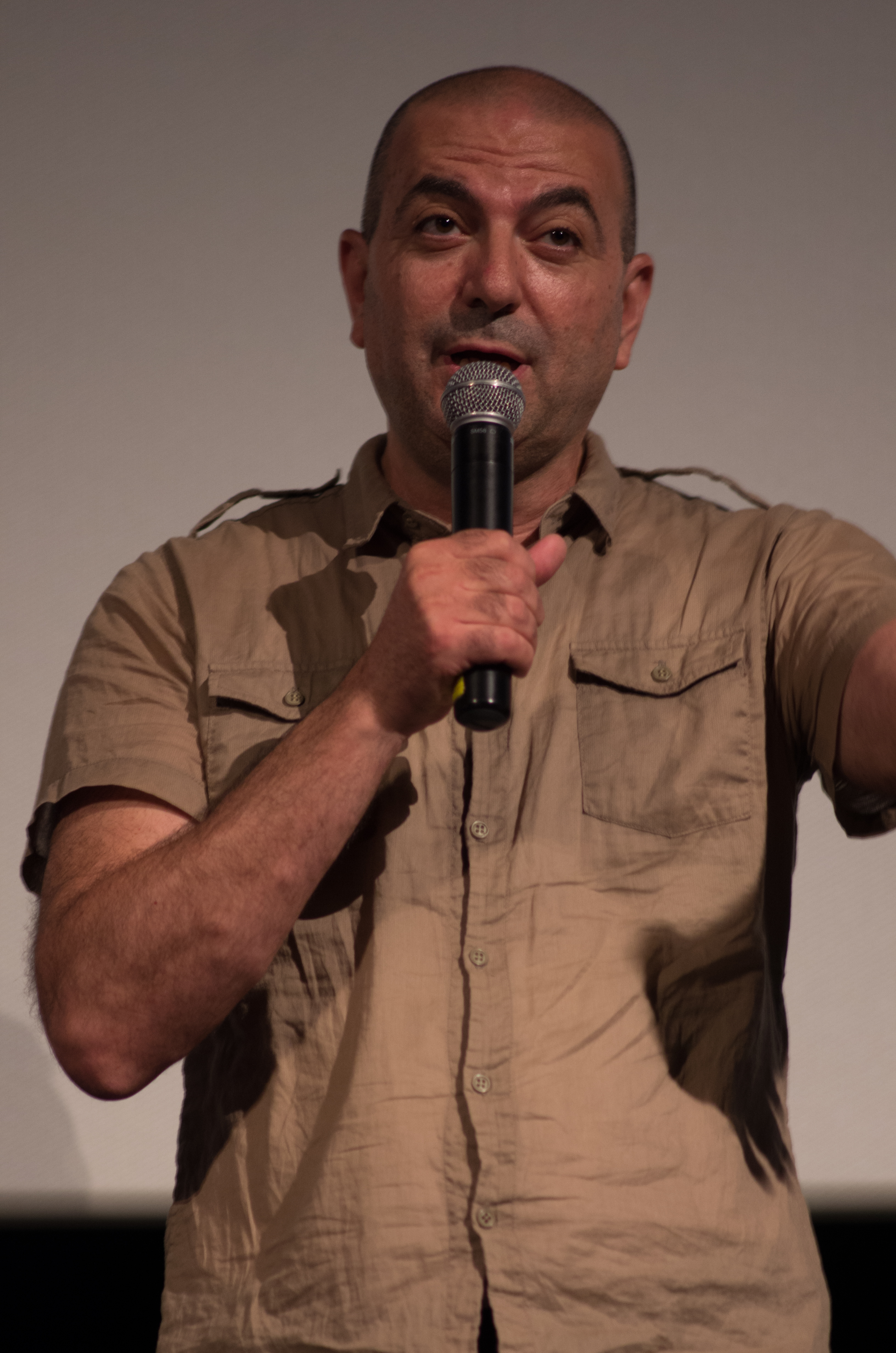
- Abu-Assad in 2013
- Born: 11 October 1961 (age 64); Nazareth
- Occupations: Film director; screenwriter

Hany Abu-Assad (Arabic: هاني أبو أسعد; born 11 October 1961) is a Palestinian and Dutch filmmaker, twice nominated for Academy Awards, in 2006 for the psychological drama Paradise Now, and in 2013 for the drama Omar. Nominated more for more than 50 international film awards, he has won 21 prizes, including a Golden Globe, Cannes Special Jury Prize and best film at the Asia Pacific Screen Awards.

== Early life ==
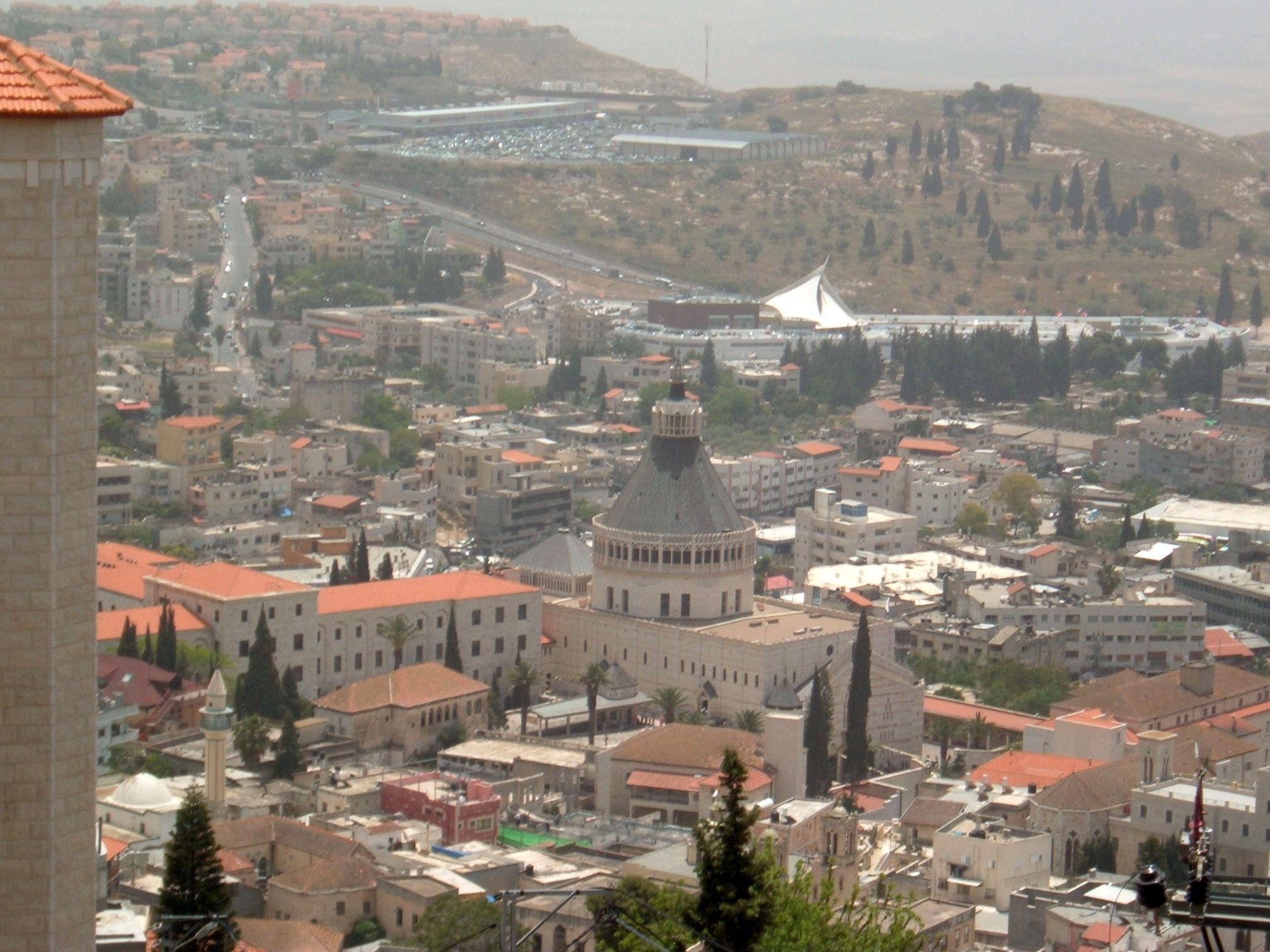
Panoramic view of Nazareth, Abu-Assad's birthplace

Abu-Assad was born into a Palestinian family on 11 October 1961 in Nazareth. In 1981, he moved to the Netherlands, where he studied aerodynamics in Haarlem and worked as an airplane engineer for several years. Abu-Assad holds dual Israeli and Dutch citizenship but identifies as a Palestinian from Palestine.

Abu-Assad was inspired to pursue a career in cinema after watching a film by Palestinian filmmaker Michel Khleifi. He initially started as a television producer working on commissions for Channel 4 and the BBC. In 1990, he co-founded Ayloul Film Productions with Palestinian filmmaker Rashid Masharawi.

== Film career ==
Abu-Assad's Palestinian identity and the struggle for justice are central to his body of work, but his journey in the world of film began in the Netherlands. He wrote and directed his first short film, Paper House in 1992 for NOS Dutch television. It depicted the efforts of a young Palestinian boy to build a dreamhouse after his own family home had been destroyed, and won several international film festival awards.

The first feature film he directed was in Dutch, Het 14de kippetje (The Fourteenth Chick), in 1998. He co-wrote the script based on a story by writer Arnon Grunberg.

He went on to direct two documentaries focused on his native Palestine: Nazareth 2000 (2000) for Dutch TV and Ford Transit (2002). The latter, which blurred the lines between documentary and fiction, won several awards at human rights and international film festivals, including the Jury Prize at the Thessaloniki Film Festival. It followed a Palestinian taxi driver picking up passengers between checkpoints in the West Bank, including Hanan Ashrawi. Abu-Assad went on to direct the feature film, Rana's Wedding (2002), produced as a Dutch-Palestinian collaboration & filmed in Ramallah and Jerusalem. It won several awards at international film festivals for best film & actress (Clara Khoury).

In 2005, Paradise Now, a psychological drama film directed by Abu-Assad—who co-wrote the screenplay with Bero Beyer—won the Golden Calf for Best Feature Film at the Netherlands Film Festival. The same year, Abu-Assad and Beyer won the European Film Award for Best Screenwriter. The following year, Paradise Now won the Golden Globe Award for Best Foreign Language Film and received an Academy Award nomination in the same category. It was the first time a film submitted by Palestine for Best International Feature Film was nominated at the Academy Awards.

His 2013 film Omar was screened in the Un Certain Regard section at the 2013 Cannes Film Festival where it won the Jury Prize. In 2014, Omar was the Palestinian entry for the Best Foreign Language Film at the 86th Academy Awards, and was nominated for the award. He is the only Palestinian director to achieved this distinction, and twice. The film also won the award for Best Film at the Asia Pacific Screen Awards.

In 2014, Abu-Assad was invited to join the Academy of Motion Picture Arts and Sciences. In 2018, he joined the film jury for ShortCutz Amsterdam.

== Filmography ==
- Paper House (1992, short film) - Director
- Curfew (1993) - Producer
- The 13th (1997, short film) - Director
- The Fourteenth Chick (1998) - Director
- Rana's Wedding (2002) - Director
- Paradise Now (2005) - Director
- The Courier (2012) - Director
- Omar (2013)
- The Idol (2015)
- The Mountain Between Us (2017)
- Huda's Salon (2021)

== Documentaries ==
- Dar 0 Dour (1990) - Producer
- Long Days in Gaza (1991) - Producer
- De Arabieren van 2001 (1999) - Director
- Het Spijkerkwartier (2000) - Director
- Nazareth 2000 (2000) - Director
- Ford Transit (2002) - Director

== See also ==
- List of Palestinian submissions for the Academy Award for Best Foreign Language Film
