= A Borrowed Identity =

- Film poster
- Directed by: Eran Riklis
- Written by: Sayed Kashua
- Starring: Tawfeek Barhom; Yael Abecassis; Michael Moshonov; Ali Suliman; Danielle Kitsis; Marlene Bajali; Laëtitia Eïdo; Razi Gabareen
- Release date: 27 November 2014 (Israel)
- Running time: 105 minutes
- Country: Israel
- Languages: Arabic; Hebrew
- Box office: $281,540

A Borrowed Identity (Arabic: العرب الراقصون; Hebrew: זהות שאולה) is a 2014 Israeli drama film directed by Eran Riklis. It is based on Sayed Kashua's book Dancing Arabs (2002). In Canada the film was released under the title Dancing Arabs, which was the film's English-language title at its world premiere (one reviewer noted that the title "will prove tricky in marketing campaigns"). The film was considered a flop in Israel, with only 48,000 views, despite an $11 million budget.

The film tells the story of Eyad, an Israeli-Palestinian teenager from Tira who moves to Jerusalem to attend an elite Jewish high school, where he meets Naomi, a Jewish student, and falls in love with her. As part of his school-mandated community service, he meets Yonatan, who has muscular dystrophy, and his mother Edna.

In May 2014, the film was selected to open the Jerusalem Film Festival. However, the beginning of the IDF's Operation Protective Edge in the Gaza Strip in July 2014 and the tense security situation at the time delayed the film's completion by an additional four months. Its title was also slightly changed, with the addition of a subtitle, "A Borrowed Identity", to avoid provocations. The film was also chosen for screening at the Locarno Film Festival in Switzerland.

== Plot ==
Eyad is a gifted Palestinian teenager who is accepted to an elite Israeli school. His father drives him to Jerusalem and drops Eyad off at the new school. Before entering the school, Eyad's father tells him that the Palestinian people once longed to defeat their Jewish enemies, but will now settle for being able to live side by side with dignity. At school, he struggles to adapt. His Israeli peers refer to him as "Ayid" and he is looked down upon by the others. Things change once he meets Naomi; he helps her with her chemistry schoolwork and the two start to meet at a cafe.

Yonatan is a disabled Israeli teen whom Eyad is assigned by the school to visit. Eyad and Yonatan develop a strong bond, as they are both considered outsiders. Back in school, Eyad and Naomi fall in love and meet up constantly, however, things begin to get complicated. Eyad excels in the classroom and begins to earn the trust and respect of his Jewish peers. He begins to sell falafel and bagels and starts to finally feel comfortable at the school. One day, as Eyad and Naomi are walking in the streets, Naomi asks Eyad to tell her he loves her in Arabic, whereupon an Israeli soldier overhears Eyad, asks to see his ID card, and aggressively questions him.

In English class, Eyad and Naomi declare their love to the others and want to tell the world about their relationship. Once Naomi tells her parents about her Palestinian boyfriend, she is no longer allowed to go back to school. Eyad also drops out of school and asks the principal to inform Naomi's parents that she can now go back to school as he is no longer there. The decision angers Eyad's father and he is no longer welcome at home, so he moves to a flat in East Jerusalem and begins to seek work as a waiter. After many unsuccessful attempts, he lands a job as a dishwasher.

By this point, Yonatan's health has deteriorated significantly and he is no longer able to move. Yonatan's mother asks Eyad to move in with them, as she trusts him and cannot take care of Yonatan by herself.

Eyad realizes that he and Yonatan resemble each other, takes Yonatan's Israeli ID, and becomes a waiter. Yonatan's mother finds out, but allows Eyad to continue as long as no one ever finds out. Using Yonatan's ID, Eyad takes Yonatan's final exams and scores highly for both of them. Naomi serves in the IDF and tells Eyad that she is sick of lying and chooses to break things off. A while later, Yonatan dies, while Eyad (posing as Yonatan) informs the Muslim authorities that the Muslim Eyad has died. Eyad and Yonatan's mother attend the funeral and the screen goes white.

== Cast ==
- Tawfeek Barhom as Eyad
- Michael Moshonov as Yonatan
- Yael Abecassis as Edna, Yonatan's mother
- Danielle Kitsis as Naomi
- Ali Suliman as Salah, Eyad's father
- Marlene Bajali as Aisha, Eyad's grandmother
- Laëtitia Eïdo as Fahima, Eyad's mother
- Keren Tzur as History Teacher

== Reception ==
Godfrey Cheshire of the RogerEbert.com gave A Borrowed Identity 3 out of 5, while Stephanie Merry of The Washington Post gave it 3 out of 4 stars. Metacritic gave the film an approval of 73%, based on 14 reviews while Rotten Tomatoes gave Dancing Arabs 93%, based on 30 reviews. John Anderson of Newsday who called the film A Borrowed Life, gave it 3 out of 4 stars and compared it to Zaytoun. He also praised its camerawork, music, and characters. Michael Nazarewycz gave A Borrowed Identity 9 out of 10 and called it a "must see indie".

A Borrowed Identity was released on DVD on 29 October 2015.
