= Aviya Kopelman =

Israeli composer and pianist (born 1978)

Aviya Kopelman (Hebrew: אביה קופלמן; born in Moscow 1978) is an Israeli composer and pianist, and music educator.

She is one of the youngest-ever recipients of the Prime Minister's Prize for Composition and served as composer-in-residence of the Jerusalem Symphony Orchestra from 2013 to 2020.

== Biography ==
Kopelman's musical education started with piano lessons. She is listed as a "notable alumna of Israel Arts and Science Academy," where she studied with Prof. Andre Hajdu, prof. Bat-Sheva Rubinstein and Prof. Michael Wolpe. She holds degrees in composition from Jerusalem Music and Dance Academy, Bar-Ilan University (MA Summa Cum Laude, PhD in progress).

She was a lecturer at Hed College of Music from 2003–2007 and a senior lecturer, as well as an academic advisor and master-classes curator in Rimon School of Jazz and Contemporary Music from 2006–2014. She gives lectures and courses in major educational institutions in Israel, including Jerusalem Music and Dance Academy, Buchmann-Mehta School of Music of Tel Aviv University, Haifa University, Levinsky College, Musrara College, Bar-Ilan University Music Department, Van Leer Jerusalem Institute.

As a Composer-in-Residence of the Jerusalem Symphony, Kopelman enlarged (at least doubled) and significantly widened the Israeli music repertoire performed by the orchestra, allowing many young composers and female composers to be performed by a professional symphony orchestra for the first time.

In 2019-2020, she was a recipient of two prestigious residencies: one was six months residency in Cite Internationale des Arts in Paris, and the one was at the Magnes Collection of Jewish Art and Life of the University of California, Berkeley, and the Israel Institute.

== Selected concert works ==
=== Orchestral and Symphonic ===
- May They Rest in Peace (2002) – Symphonic work addressing political conflict and memory.
- Kan Ya Ma Kan — Once Upon a Time (2004) – Concerto for oud, violin, and string orchestra.
- Landscape in Fume – Originally composed in 2004 for cello octet in memory of the Warsaw Ghetto Uprising; arranged for full orchestra in 2024 and given its German premiere at the Konzerthaus Berlin by the Berlin Academy of American Music (BAAM), conducted by Garrett Keast.
- Between Gaza and Berlin (2014) – Symphonic piece reflecting on complex cultural and political themes.
- Concerto for Flute (2017) – For flute and full symphony orchestra.
- Ode to Jerusalem (2019) – Symphonic overture.
- [Not] Letting Go (2023) – Concerto for an improvising saxophone soloist and orchestra combining contemporary classical writing and jazz idioms; premiered by Idit Shner at the North American Saxophone Alliance (NASA) conference.
- Bring Them Home (2024) – Orchestral piece dedicated to the Israeli hostages in Gaza.
- Hope for Hope (2024) – Scored for solo violin and string orchestra; written for violinist Michael Guttman and the Brussels Chamber Orchestra.

=== Chamber and Instrumental ===
- Widows & Lovers (2007) – Commissioned by the Kronos Quartet as part of the "Kronos: Under 30" project. Premiered at Carnegie Hall and subsequently workshopped and performed by the Ragazze Quartet and various ensembles. The third movement, "Black Widow," is performed as an independent work and was arranged for string orchestra by the Swedish ensemble Kvinnoorkestern.
- Additional Chamber Repertoire – Instrumental works commissioned and performed by the Arthur Rubinstein International Piano Competition, Cremona Quartet, Jerusalem Trio, Conjunto Ibérico Octet, Israel Camerata Jerusalem, Israeli Chamber Orchestra, Ra'anana Symphonette, Israel Sinfonietta Beer Sheva, Carmel Quartet, and the Waterloo Soloists.

=== Vocal and Choral ===
- Hebrew Magnificat (2005; re-orchestrated 2017) – For SATB choir and symphony orchestra; setting Latin, German, and Hebrew texts.
- Belong Not (2019) – Set to Khalil Gibran's poem On Children, co-commissioned by the San Francisco Girls Chorus and the Israel Institute. Premiered at the Yerba Buena Center for the Arts with choreography by Chuck Wilt and Robert Dekkers for the U.S. 19th Amendment centennial.
- Sooner and Later (2019) – Scored for soprano, string orchestra, percussion, and drums on poems by Leah Goldberg; commissioned by the Israel Chamber Orchestra marking 50 years since Goldberg's passing.
- Grief Measure – Commissioned by Carnegie Hall for the Dawn Upshaw Professional Training Workshop; scored for voice, drums, bass, and electronics.
- Songs of Love and Distress – Song cycle for voice and piano or string quartet, setting poetry by Anna Akhmatova, Yona Wallach, David Avidan, and Kopelman.

== Cross-Genre, Jazz, and Experimental Work ==
Kopelman frequently incorporates elements of rock, pop, jazz, and electronic music into her artistic projects:

- Minority (2021) – Art-pop and string album featuring New York-based vocalist Ella Joy Meir, reviewed alongside other classical-pop crossover work in Haaretz. Kopelman later re-arranged the album for string quartet, piano, and electronic drums, performing it with metal vocalist David-avi Dolev at the Israel Music Showcase Festival.
- Turquoise Project: Jazz-fusion ensemble (brass and rhythm section) for which Kopelman composed, performed, and recorded.
- Collaborations: Cross-genre artistic collaborations with non-classical and improvising musicians, including saxophonists Idit Shner and Matan Chapnitzky, oud players Yair Dalal and Sameer Makhoul, rock-blues singer Ruth Dolores Weiss, guitarist Yonatan Albalak, electronic artist Sacha Terrat, and jazz flutist Ilan Salem.
