= Arab Labor =

- Also known as: Avoda Aravit
- Genre: Comedy-drama
- Written by: Sayed Kashua
- Directed by: Ronnie Ninio (season 1); Shai Kapon (season 2–4)
- Starring: Norman Issa, Clara Khoury, Salim Daw, Salwa Nakra, Fatma Yihye, Mariano Idelman, Mira Awad
- Opening theme: Ng'ayer Bukra (Change Tomorrow) by DAM
- Country of origin: Israel
- Original languages: Arabic; Hebrew
- No. of seasons: 4
- No. of episodes: 43 (+ Independence Day special)

Production
- Executive producer: Daniel Paran
- Producer: Yoni Paran
- Production location: Israel
- Editors: Udi Leon, Michal Cohen
- Running time: 48 minutes

Original release
- Network: Channel 2 (Keshet)
- Release: 2007 – 2013

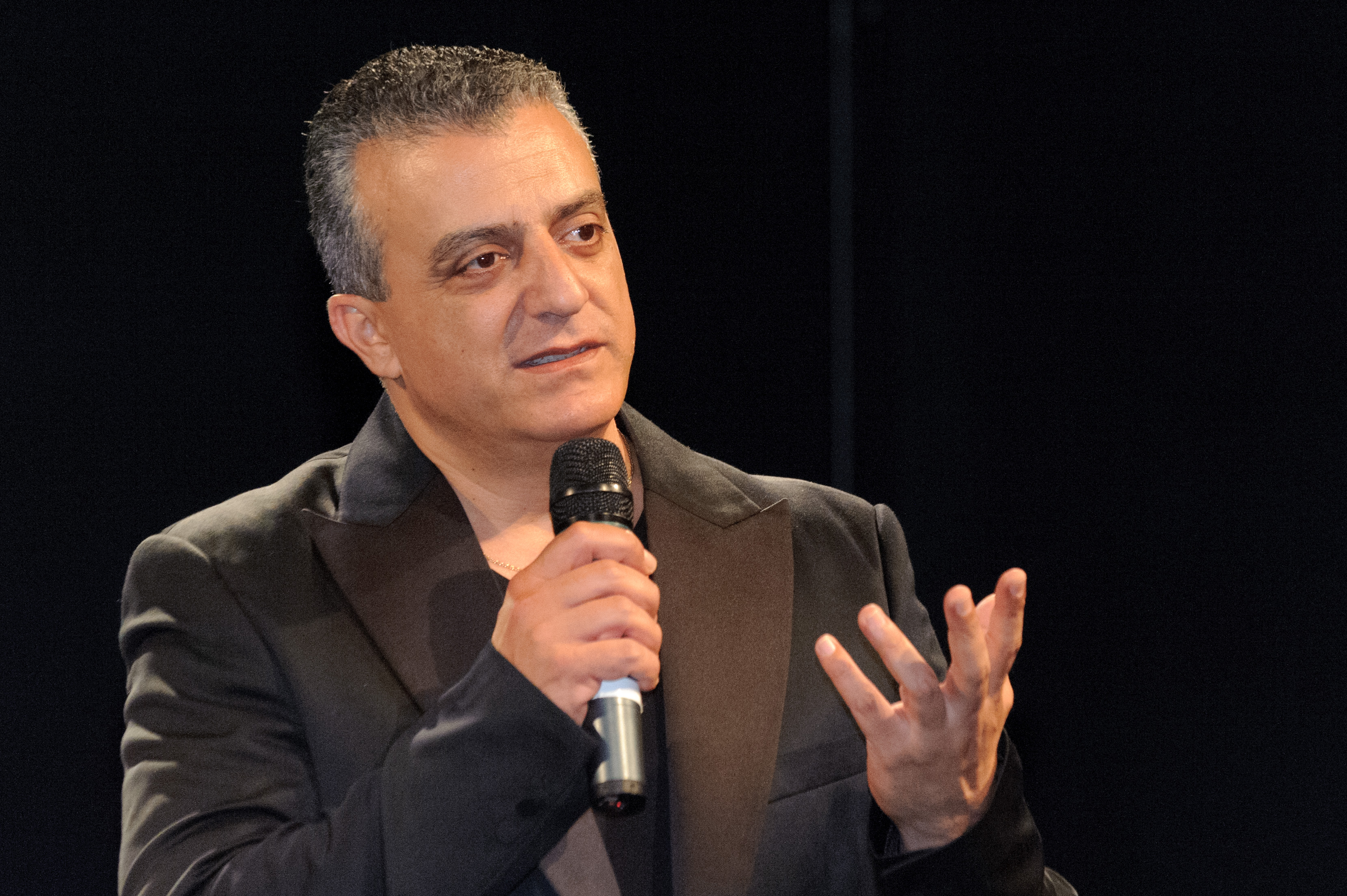
Norman Issa portrays the main character Amjad

Arab Labor (Hebrew: עבודה ערבית, Avoda Aravit; Arabic: شغل عَرَب, Shughl Arab) is an Israeli sitcom television series, created by the Arab-Israeli writer and journalist Sayed Kashua.

== History ==
The series premiered on Keshet Channel 2 in Israel in 2007. The second season was broadcast in 2008 and the third season in 2012. The series, whose title in colloquial Hebrew carries the implication of "shoddy or second-rate work", focuses on the family and work situations of Amjad, an Arab-Israeli journalist. Much of the comedy is derived from the paradox of Amjad's love-hate relationship with his Arab identity and his simultaneous wish to integrate comfortably into Israeli society.

Poking fun at the cultural divide, Kashua's characters play on religious, cultural and political differences to depict the mixed society prevalent in Israel.

In the United States, the program aired nationally on Link TV. It also appeared on KCET in Los Angeles in 2014.

The show has won two consecutive Awards of the Israeli Television Academy for Best Comedy Series.

== Cast ==
- Amjad Alian (Norman Issa) – An Arab-Israeli journalist working in Jerusalem
- Meir Cohen (Mariano Idelman) – photojournalist, Amjad's Jewish-Israeli coworker at the magazine
- Bushra Alian (Clara Khoury) – Amjad's wife
- Amal (Mira Awad) – An Arab-Israeli attorney to whom Meir is attracted
- Ismael, Abu Amjad (Salim Daw) – Amjad's father
- Umm Amjad (Salwa Nakra -Seasons 1–3), (Alham Araff - Season 4)) – Amjad's mother
- Maya Alian (Fatma Yihye) – Amjad and Bushra's daughter
- Natan (Dov Navon) and Timna (Rona Lipaz-Michael) - Joined in Season 2, neighbors of Amjad and Bushra
- Yoske (Aryeh Moskona) and Yocheved (Sandra Sade) - Seasons 2 and 3 only, neighbors of Amjad and Bushra
- Ami Schuster (Menashe Noy) - Joined in Season 3, Amjad's agent

== Reception ==
The Chicago Tribune described it as "... a groundbreaking TV show that finds humor in sharing a homeland." The New York Times commented, "Kashua has managed to barge through cultural barriers and bring an Arab point of view ... into the mainstream of Israeli entertainment."

== Reviews ==
- Mary McNamara (15 November 2008). "Finding humor and truth amid conflict". Los Angeles Times.
- Jonathan Curiel (13 November 2008). "Meet the Palestinian Seinfeld. Who knew?". San Francisco Chronicle.
- Ali Jaafar (1 February 2008). "Israeli sitcom about Arabs a hit". Variety.
- Isabel Kershner (7 January 2008). "TV comedy depicts world of the Arab Israeli". International Herald Tribune.
- Anat Rosenberg (29 January 2008). "'Avoda Aravit' - breaking TV barriers". The Jerusalem Post.

== See also ==
- Television in Israel
- Arab-Israeli peace projects
