= Dancing Arabs (novel) =

Novel by Palestinian writer Sayed Kashua

- First edition (Hebrew)
- Author: Sayed Kashua
- Original title: ערבים רוקדים / Aravim Rokdim
- Translator: Miriam Shlesinger
- Language: Hebrew
- Published: 2002 (Keter Publishing House) (Hebrew); 2004 (GrovePress) (English)
- Publication place: Israel
- Pages: 224
- ISBN: 0802141269

Dancing Arabs (Hebrew: ערבים רוקדים, romanized: aravim rokdim) is the 2002 debut novel of Palestinian writer Sayed Kashua. The work is considered semi-autobiographical, as it draws much on Kashua's real experiences growing up as a Palestinian citizen of Israel. He is also a screenwriter and columnist, publishing most of his work in Hebrew.

The novel tells the story of a Palestinian Israeli teenager from Tira who is admitted to an elite school in Jerusalem. The novel explores his lifelong struggle between his pride in his Palestinian identity and the desire to be a part of Israeli society.

== Plot summary ==
The novel opens with the narrator’s childhood in the Israeli Arab city of Tira. The beginning of the novel is characterized by the narrator being mostly unaware of what goes on around him due to his young age. At the beginning of the novel, he is especially close to his grandmother, who charges him with making sure to inform the rest of his family about her secret stash of items to be buried with her upon her death. This causes him to look through the stash, finding an old newspaper clipping about his father. This newspaper clipping reveals that his father was held under administrative detention and questioned by Shin Bet for 2 years in connection to a bombing in a university cafeteria. Upon release, the narrator’s father continued to be an ardent supporter of Palestinian liberation as well as communist causes, echoing the sympathies of many in Tira. The father, who often physically hits the narrator and his siblings, continuously attempts to instill a sense of national pride in his children, chiding them for not understanding what the Palestinian Liberation Organization is as well as reminding them of their grandfather who died a shahid during the war of 1948. During this same period, the oblivious narrator and his siblings witness a news report of the Sabra and Shatilla massacre, which they incorporate into their childhood games due to a lack of understanding of the events. At the same time, their father is one of the only people in the city who refuses to sell his land, as he believes that the people of the village should continue to hold on to what is rightfully theirs.

As the narrator transitions into middle school, he is abruptly hospitalized after a large fall. Subsequently, he undergoes a large change in his personality. He goes from a disruptive and ill-mannered child to a well-behaved one who excels in all of his classes. Even so, he and his classmates are often struck by teachers in school and are often exposed to unhygienic and unproductive learning conditions. It is during this time in his life that his school participates in a Seeds of Peace program. This is the first time the narrator meets an Israeli Jew, as he is paired up with another boy his age over the course of the program. He ends up being convinced that the Jewish boy loves him due to the boy’s insistence on partnering with him and only him. It is also during this time in his life that the narrator begins to prove his intelligence, as he solves a city-wide trivia competition and tests into an elite boarding school in Jerusalem. Although he is still fairly unaware of the state of his poor living conditions in Tira, his grandmother pointedly tells him that “maybe it’s good you’re going away” as this chapter of his life comes to a close.

As the narrator begins his high school career at the Jewish-majority boarding school, he has a difficult time. His roommates and classmates make fun of him for his distinctly different music taste, bedsheets, and dinner manners. However, he finds comfort in moving in with Adel, a student one year older than him who is the only other Arab student at his school. He invites Adel home, and on the way they get harassed by local Jewish kids and stopped at a checkpoint by Jewish soldiers. This causes the narrator to break down crying, vowing to himself that he would better assimilate into Jewish culture and never be recognized as an Arab again. He thus begins a rapid transformation, quickly buying himself clothes popular in the Jewish parts of Israel, learning Western songs, and generally distancing himself from his Arab family and friends. He even becomes integrated enough into his new community to be given an Uzi by his teacher. It is while he is carrying this gun on a field trip with his new class that he runs into his old class from Tira. He ignores his former classmates and refuses to acknowledge to his new Jewish friends that he knows the other Arab students. He also refuses to go home during the following school break due to his belief that his parents don’t treat him right. Instead, he goes to his Jewish friend's Passover Seder, where gets mistaken by his friend’s relative for being Jewish instead of Arab.

During his final two years of high school, he falls in love with the Jewish girl Naomi with whom he has a rocky relationship. Naomi’s father was killed serving in the Israel Defense Forces, and the narrator’s refusal to stand for the memorial siren on Yom HaZikaron causes their relationship to begin with a rough start. Nonetheless, they both confess to loving each other and begin dating until the final few days before their high school graduation. At that point, Naomi’s mother refuses to allow her daughter to date an Arab man, so Naomi breaks up with the narrator. During these final stages of the relationship, however, the narrator becomes overworked and overwhelmed, becoming dependent on pills that counteract hypertension. After he and Naomi break up, he takes 10 of these pills at once and overdoses, resulting in him being checked into the hospital and almost failing his finals.

After barely scraping through his last year of high school, the narrator enrolls in Hebrew University. There he lives as a “settler”—a type of student who lives in the dorms of the university without being eligible for university housing. During his time there, he meets another Arab student, Samia, whom he quickly begins to date. He never graduates from Hebrew University, instead ending up working as a bartender at a dive bar.

Four years after the narrator and Samia meet, he suddenly wakes up and decides to marry her. At his urging they go back to Tira and get married on the spot, resulting in the narrator’s father getting angered by the narrator not marrying in a more traditional manner. The father forces him to go through another long, expansive ceremony with extended family present. Quickly, though, the narrator comes to realize that he only loves Samia when he is in Tira. When they live their regular lives in Jerusalem he feels trapped in a loveless marriage that he would leave if not for their first child. Samia even tells him that he should find a lover, but the narrator feels like that would be impossible to do since the Arab community would judge him for his actions. Nevertheless, he does end up cheating on her with an unspecified Jewish woman, after which he shows intense remorse and lapses back into thinking of himself as an Arab man who can go on and accomplish great things in the name of his people. This episode does not last long though, as he soon reverts back to his hatred of his Arab identity. He finds a kindred soul for this hatred in Shadia, a fellow Israeli-Arab bartender who hates her identity and other Arabs just like the narrator. Unlike him, however, she is always on the move and no longer has a place that she can call home.

The novel then takes a turn to describe the narrator’s father and his job in the Israeli government’s ID office in Tira, a position he got because of his political support of a collaborator for Tira’s mayor. It first becomes a source of intense shame for his father, since he is seen as working for the government that is hated by the people of Tira. However, his ability to access old documents from the era of the British Mandate of Palestine due to this position makes him a hero, as he begins to uncover the forgotten birthdays of everyone in town to allow them to properly celebrate.

At around this same time, the people of Tira lose faith in the cause of Palestinian liberation as the Russians lose the Cold War. The narrator’s father relegates his communist books to a distant, top shelf in his library. Adel breaks up with his Russian girlfriend and instead turns to Islam, which is becoming a larger driving force for many characters in the novel. Adel attempts to get the narrator to become a true believer, taking him to Mecca to see the Kaaba. The narrator, however, does not find this trip convincing. He returns to Israel to his wife giving birth, so he has to rush her to the hospital. On the way, he is recognized multiple times as an Arab, both by soldiers who stop him at a checkpoint and also by other Arabs with whom he ends up speaking in Arabic. He blames his wife for these incidents and is deeply ashamed of this recognition of his Arab identity.

The narrator then returns to a changed Tira amid another war. This Tira is a far richer one, where the money from Jewish tourists who pass through the area is vital to the local economy. Now, the Land Day demonstrations which were prominent in the narrator’s childhood have become muted, as they would scare off the Jewish tourists that the town depends on. The narrator’s father has given up completely on the cause of Palestinian freedom, stating that he believes that the Al-Aqsa Mosque should be blown up as vengeance for the apathy of the wider Arab world towards the Palestinians. Additionally, when the first male grandchild in the new generation of the narrator’s family is born, he gets a Jewish name instead of a Russian or Arab one since it would save him problems in the future.

The narrator wakes up one morning while staying in Tira to his grandmother throwing up in the bathroom. She begins to cry, and states to him that she isn’t crying because she fears death, but because she always thought she would be buried on her own land. She then reminds the narrator about his promise to tell the rest of the family about her secret stash of items to be buried with. The novel closes with him and his grandmother crying in each others’ arms.

== Characters ==
- The Narrator: The unnamed protagonist of the novel, the narrator is an Israeli Arab from Tira who grapples with his Arab identity in a predominantly Jewish society. His experiences and struggles to find an identity and place for himself in Israeli society, drawn from Kashua’s own, are the core of the story.
- The Narrator's Father: A Palestinian activist who was jailed for 2 years by Shin Bet for a possible connection to a university cafeteria bombing. He begins the novel as an ardent supporter of Communist and Pan-Arab causes, which he tries to impress upon the narrator. However, by the end of the novel he becomes disillusioned with these causes and gives up on his activism.
- The Narrator's Grandmother: A central figure in the narrator's early life, his grandmother maintains a strong connection to traditional values and serves as a source of emotional support for the narrator.
- Naomi: A Jewish girl whom the narrator falls in love with during his time at the Jewish boarding school. Their relationship faces societal pressures and internal conflicts due to the cultural divide between them.
- Adel: Another Arab student at the Jewish boarding school whom the narrator befriends before he fits in with Jewish students. Unlike the narrator, he turns to Islam later in the novel as a solution to his issues of integrating into wider Israeli society.
- Samia: the narrator’s wife, an Arab student at Hebrew University whom the narrator marries. Ultimately, he ends up feeling trapped to her in a loveless marriage. Their relationship highlights the narrator’s struggle with the expectations of his Arab culture and his often contradictory feelings surrounding it.
- Shadia: A woman whom the narrator meets while he works at a bar in Jerusalem and shares his rejection of his Arab identity. Their relationship reflects the narrator's ongoing struggle with his Arab identity and serves as a reflection on the narrator’s privilege to have a home back in Tira to return to.

== Themes ==
=== Assimilation ===
Throughout the novel, there is a pervasive struggle between the narrator’s sense of identity as an Arab citizen of Israel and his desire to blend into the Jewish-dominated spaces that he spends most of the novel inhabiting. This intense desire is born out of his inability to navigate life outside of Tira normally as an Arab, as he is continuously ostracized and singled out by both civilians and the state of Israel itself during his childhood and adulthood. The narrator thus rejects the idea that he can exist as an Arab at all in Jewish spaces. Subsequently, he spends most of the novel attempting to hide his Arab identity and promote the idea that he is Jewish. The select instances in which this mask falls, including when his wife gives birth to their daughter, are moments of profound embarrassment for the narrator whose life view is built around denying his self-identity to be able to access Jewish spaces.

This struggle is mirrored more widely in the cultural assimilation of the city of Tira. The narrator’s childhood experiences are characterized by an underdeveloped and traditional Tira filled with overwhelming hatred for the Jewish state. This Tira, represented by several characters like the narrator’s grandmother and father, believes that the people of Tira should hold on to their land and resist Jewish rule. Several instances of major protests against the state, including one against a visit by Meir Kahane, occurred during this early part of the narrator’s childhood. However, by the end of the novel, several details pointed out by the narrator indicate that Tira is slowly assimilating into the wider Jewish-dominated culture of Israel. The wealth brought by the Jewish tourists has transformed the once-poor Tira. It has provided opportunities for the people of the city, which has led to a larger cultural impact of the liberal Jewish society onto the city, but also the sale of much of the land once owned by the Israeli-Arabs of the city. His youngest sibling’s wall at the end of the novel, which includes many references to Western and Israeli culture right alongside pictures of Keffiyehs, indicates a Tira that is beginning to assimilate just like the narrator.

=== Critique of Israeli Narratives ===
Kashua purposefully writes through the lens of the Israeli-Jewish gaze throughout the novel. This is seen not only in the fact that the novel itself is written in Hebrew, which is notably not Kashua's first language, but also in the basic tropes and sub-plots of the novel.

The novel has many parallels to the narratives of the Jewish Diaspora. There is a heavy usage in the novel of diasporic tropes, like that of the love between Naomi, who came from the majority population in a more liberal society, and the narrator, who came from a closed-off minority community. Their inability to continue their love across the cultural divide is a callback to the narrative of a Diaspora Jew falling in love with a gentile girl when their relationship could never be. Additionally, the pointed use of the word “assimilation” to describe the narrator’s cultural transformation in the novel is yet another parallel to the experiences of Jews in the diaspora. This is true especially of European Jewry, who often worked to hide their Jewish identity in favor of assuming that of their host culture.

The novel also has multiple parallels with the narratives of the Zionist movement and Israeli cultural tropes. As the narrator leaves Tira behind, he increasingly parallels several tropes associated with the Zionist movement’s depiction of Israeli-born Jews, also called Sabras. He is bent on learning Hebrew to be able to read Hebrew newspapers, begins to carry the iconically Israeli Uzi gun, and dreams of being a pilot. Additionally, his grandfather’s death as a martyr in 1948 and the resulting myth that anemones grow on where he fell strongly echoes Zionist imagery. Specifically, it evokes the famous Zionist poem “Behold, here our bodies lie” by the poet Chaim Gouri dedicated to those who died in the Israeli War of Independence.

Kashua uses these narratives and tropes from the Zionist movement and the Jewish Diaspora to critique the Israeli-Jewish gaze. The same stories and tropes in which an Israeli-Jewish reader would expect to see a Jew as the protagonist instead have an Arab starring in the main role. This creates tension between the out-of-place narrator and the protagonist the reader expects him to be. This tension arises purely due to the fact that the narrator is Palestinian and doesn't fit the mold of Jewishness that Israeli culture deems to fit those kinds of stories. Thus, Kashua highlights the dangers of accepting Israelization for Israeli-Arabs as he critiques Israeli mainstream narratives that don't leave any space for Israeli-Arab stories.

== Adaptation ==
The novel was adapted as a film, A Borrowed Identity (2014), directed by Eran Riklis. Kashua wrote the screenplay.

== Reception ==
The book’s English translation was positively received, with several news outlets and book reviews publishing positive reviews of the novel. Most reviews focused on praising the gritty realism of the novel, with The New York Times stating that:

As a portrait of a young man's drift into emotional no man's land, this novel has the feel of grim truth.

And Kirkus Reviews, a book reviewing magazine, stating that:

Life, at [the] novel’s end, remains seedy, undirected, filled with sorrow, failure, and regret. Gloomy indeed. And yet this Arab-Israeli newcomer is never once self-indulgent or sentimental, with the result that his story rings out on every page with a compelling sense of human truth.
