= Roza Eidus =

Russian pianist (1930–2018)

Roza Izyaslavovna Eidus Роза Изяславовна Эйдус
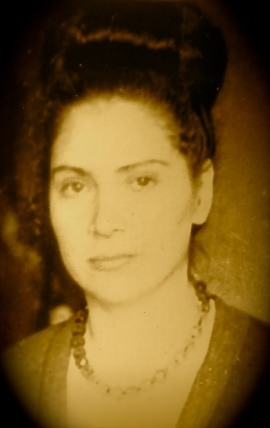

Background information
- Born: 5 November 1930; Kiev, Ukraine, USSR
- Origin: Ukraine
- Died: 6 January 2018 (aged 87) Israel
- Genre: Classical
- Occupation: Pianist
- Instrument: Piano
- Years active: 1952—2011

Roza Eidus (Russian: Роза Эйдус; 7 November 1930 – 6 January 2018) was a Russian pianist.

== Biography ==
Roza Eidus was born in Kiev, Ukraine in 1930. At the age of 10 she moved to Moscow to study at the Central Music School and continued her studies at the Moscow Tchaikovsky Conservatory, where she was a disciple of Aleksandr Goldenweiser. Her classmates included Lazar Berman and Dmitri Bashkirov. Upon graduation she appeared with orchestras in the former US, including the Kuybishev Philharmonic Orchestra and others.

In 1957, she married Russian operatic tenor and Yiddish singer Leonid Kovler and moved to Moscow Oblast, Udelnaya where she devoted herself to teaching. In 2003 she moved to Haifa, Israel where she continued to give masterclasses and perform until her death in 2018 at age 87. She is the paternal grandmother of Israeli-American composer Mátti Kovler.
