= Refqa Abu-Remaileh =

University lecturer and author

Refqa Abu-Remaileh (Arabic: رفقة أبو رميلة; born in Amman, Jordan) is a university professor and author with a focus on Modern Arabic literature and film studies. She is mainly known for her publications on the literature and films created by Palestinian people who often live as refugees and exiles, both in the Middle East and the world-wide Palestinian diaspora.

== Life and career ==
Abu-Remaileh grew up in Amman, Jordan, and graduated with an International Baccalaureate (IB) diploma in 1998. Following this, she earned her B.A. in English Literature from the University of British Columbia in 2002 and an M.St. in modern Middle Eastern Studies in 2004 from the University of Oxford. Until 2010, she pursued her PhD at Oxford, focussing on modern Arabic Literature and Film. Her thesis was dedicated to the novels of Palestinian-Israeli writer Emile Habibi and the films of Palestinian film director Elia Suleiman. From 2012 to 2020, she was consultant to the Palestinian Citizens of Israel Group, a strategic peacebuilding programme, at Oxford Research Group in London. Between 2014 and 2016, Abu-Remaileh was postdoctoral Fellow of the Alexander von Humboldt Foundation, and in May 2020, she was appointed Associate Professor for Modern Arabic Literature & Film at the Free University of Berlin. In 2025, Abu-Remaileh joined Northwestern University in Qatar as Associate Professor in Residence.

Among other studies, Abu-Remaileh has written about Elie Suleiman and Lebanese novelist Elias Khoury. In 2018, she published a chapter on the novel Children of the Ghetto by Elias Khoury for the book The Holocaust and the Nakba. In this volume, Arab and Jewish intellectuals discuss the links between the Holocaust and the Nakba, while respecting fundamental differences between them.

=== Project on mapping Palestinian literature online ===
Since 2018 Abu-Remaileh has headed "PalREAD - Country of Words: Reading and Reception of Palestinian Literature from 1948 to the Present", a research project funded by the European Research Council, that “seeks to re-trace and re-gather the scattered fragments of the story of Palestinian literature.” The goal of this project is to name and geographically situate Palestinians in literature and history since the beginning of the 20th century. Such an overview does not exist so far, and a database was specially developed for this project. Based on this, a freely accessible Internet platform will be created that not only presents written texts, interactive timelines, graphics and podcasts, but also visualize the history of literature written by Palestinians with maps and timelines. Even though much material has been lost, Abu-Remaileh found amazing cultural records: Old film rolls from movies made for the Palestine Liberation Organization, that were thought to have been destroyed in the Siege of Beirut, have turned up in a basement in Rome and in the old Russian Embassy in Jordan.

Abu-Remaileh has lectured at universities in Canada, the U.S. and Abu Dhabi on literary criticism as part of Digital Humanities. Since 2020, she has hosted a Humboldt postdoc fellowship project in Berlin named "How do you say 'trauma' in Arabic?" This project studies Palestinian writing, re-engaging with the field of Trauma Theory. Further, she is a board member of the Palestinian policy network Al-Shabaka. In a 2020 interview, she said the aim of the PalREAD project is "to tell the story of Palestinian literature across time and space, from Latin America to Palestine, the Arab world, Cyprus, Europe, the US, and beyond."

== Publications ==
- Abu-Remaileh, Refqa (2010). Documenting Palestinian Presence: A Study of the Novels of Emile Habibi and the Films of Elia Suleiman. (Dissertation) University of Oxford.
- Phillips, Amanda; Abu-Remaileh, Refqa (2010). The meeting place of British Middle East studies: emerging scholars, emergent research & approaches. Newcastle: Cambridge Scholars. ISBN 978-1-4438-1251-1. OCLC 624407581.
- Abu-Remaileh, Refqa (2013). "Narratives in Conflict: Emile Habibi's al-Waqa'i al-Ghariba and Elia Suleiman's Divine Intervention". In Matar, Dina; Harb, Zahera (eds.). Narrating Conflict in the Middle East : Discourse, Image and Communications Practices in Lebanon and Palestine. London: I.B. Tauris. ISBN 978-0-85772-241-6. OCLC 852759447.
- Abu-Remaileh, Refqa (2015). "Elia Suleiman: Narrating Negative Space (Palestine)". In Gugler, Josef (ed.). Ten Arab filmmakers : political dissent and social critique. Bloomington. ISBN 978-0-253-01658-4. OCLC 908447737.
- Abu-Remaileh, Refqa (2018). "Novel as Contrapuntal Reading: Elias Khoury's Children of the Ghetto: My Name is Adam". In Bashir, Bashir; Goldberg, Amos (eds.). The Holocaust and the Nakba: a new grammar of trauma and history. New York: Columbia University Press. pp. 295–306. doi:10.7312/bash18296. ISBN 978-0-231-54448-1. OCLC 1033549518. S2CID 219884143.
- Mahfouz Abdou, Ibrahim and Refqa Abu-Remaileh (2022). A Literary Nahda Interrupted: Pre-Nakba Palestinian Literature as Adab Maqalat. In Journal of Palestine Studies Vol.51 No. 3.

== See also ==
- Modern Arabic literature
- Palestinian literature
