= Mátti Kovler =

Israeli musical artist

Mátti Kovler מתי קובלר
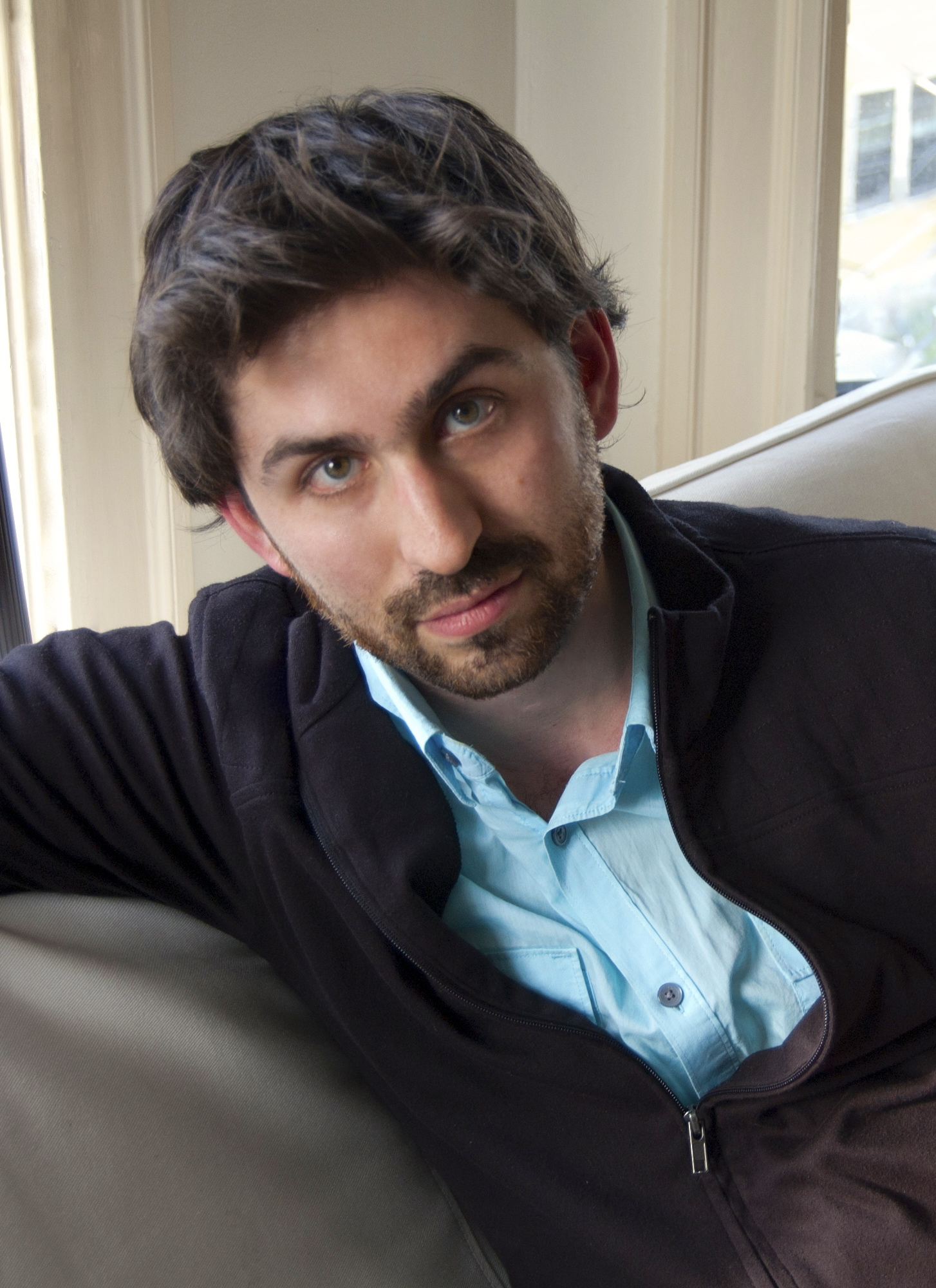
- Kovler in 2013

Background information
- Born: September 14, 1980 (age 45)
- Origin: Moscow, Russia
- Genres: Contemporary classical
- Occupation: Composer

Mátti Kovler (Hebrew: מתי קובלר; born Dmitri Konstantinovich Kovler, Russian: Дми́трий Константи́нович Ковлер; 14 September 1980, Moscow) is a Russian-born Israeli-American composer and creator of new music theatre. Called by Steve Smith of The New York Times “a potentially estimable operatic composer in the making,” his music has been compared to Leonard Bernstein's.

== Performances ==
Kovler's music, described as "intensely moving" and "by turns comic, mystical, warm, and searing" has been commissioned by the Israel Festival, the Tanglewood Music Center and the Carnegie Hall. His orchestral works have been performed worldwide by the Israel Philharmonic Orchestra, the Fox Studios Symphony (Los Angeles), the Metropole Orchestra (Amsterdam), the American Composers Orchestra (New York), the Boston Modern Orchestra Project and others.

== Awards and honors ==
Mátti was a fellow at the Tanglewood, Aspen and Accademia Chigiana Festivals, a winner of two ASCAP Morton Gould Young Composers Awards, and of the Theodore Presser Award. Mátti Kovler is a recipient of the America-Israel Cultural Foundation scholarships and holds a doctorate in Composition from the New England Conservatory. In September 2013 Mátti was recognized by the Boston Foundation as one of the six winners of the 2013 Brother Thomas Fellowships, “no strings attached” $15,000 bi-annual awards designed to support 6 talented artists making outstanding contributions to their community through excellence in their craft.

== Musical Influences ==
Kovler has mastered a range of styles from folk and jazz to those steeped in the classical tradition, and brings these together in works of considerable dramatic scope. His musical influences include folklore research, improvisation, a deep fascination with Janáček and Bartók poly-modality and the cult writings of the French theatre philosopher Antonin Artaud. Somewhat reactionary to his Soviet upbringing, Kovler's interest in bringing sacred texts or melodies from the Jewish tradition into a contemporary context was ignited by his mentor, Israeli composer André Hajdu, a student of Messiaen and Milhaud. An advocate of expanding the definition of "Jewish musical theater," over the past decade Kovler created a substantial body of work intended to propel this genre beyond wallowing in a nostalgic past. They aim to tap into a more nuanced, multi-dimensional sensibility aligned with the younger generation—a generation that is rooted in tradition but yearns for the next step, beyond Fiddler on the Roof.

== Floating Tower ==
Mátti Kovler is the artistic director of Floating Tower, based in Brooklyn, NYC. With a modular make-up of 27 multi-national actors/musicians, Floating Tower operates as a creator, producer and educator developing innovative content and new avenues for cross-cultural engagement. Since its founding in 2011, Floating Tower has created over thirty productions in the United States, Israel, China and Russia. Spanning from traditional to experimental, Floating Tower events have been staged at venues ranging from Boston's Museum of Fine Arts to the Collector Gallery, a 1000 sq. ft. underground art-cave in Moscow.

== Recent Projects ==
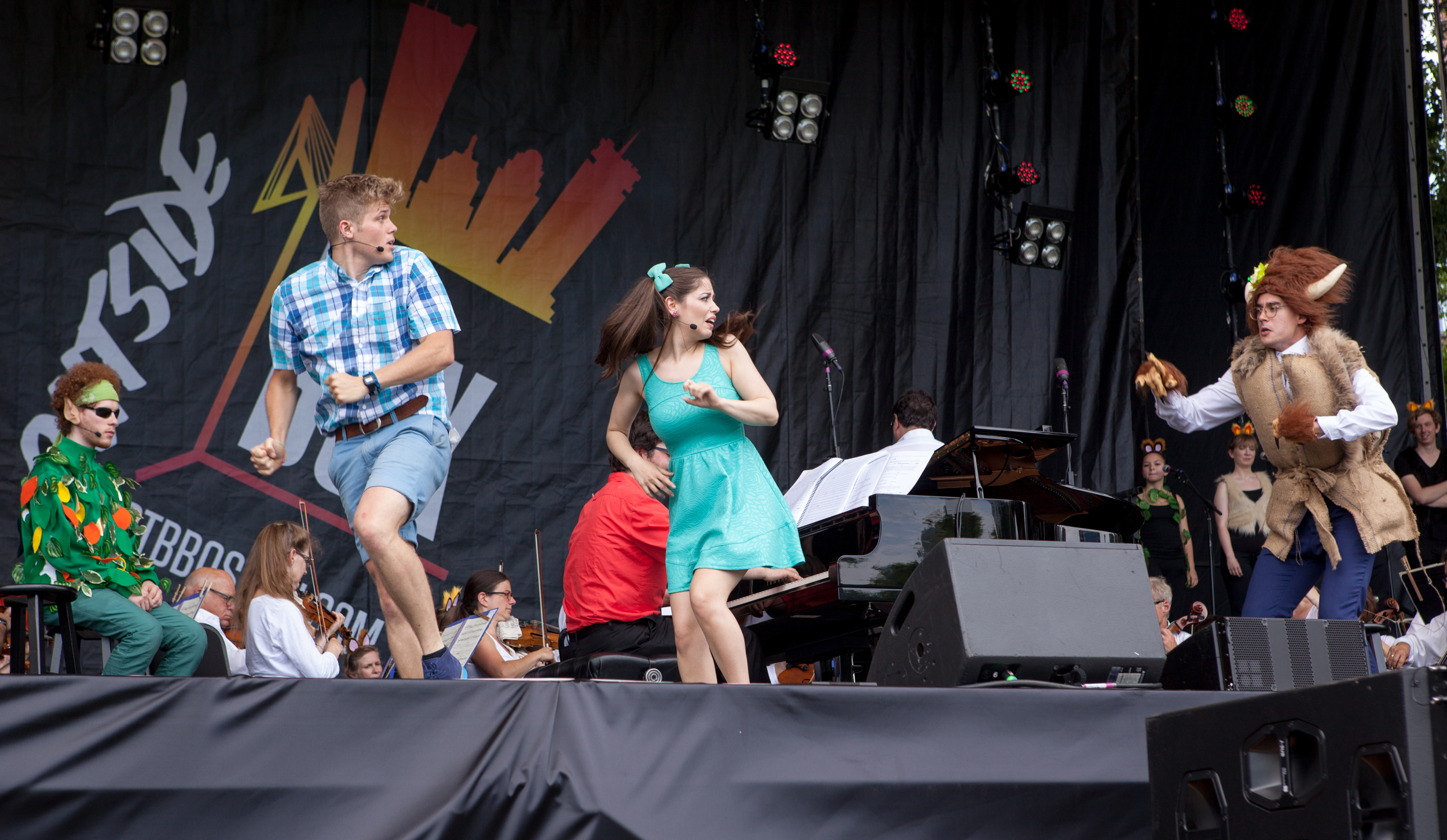
Ami and Tami in Outside The Box Festival, Boston

Ami and Tami — A musical fable for children, Ami and Tami is a contemporary twist on Hansel and Gretel. Based on an earlier piece co-written by Kovler and Aya Lavie, the piece was substantially adapted and translated to English by Spencer Garfield. World premiere took place as part of the Outside The Box Festival on Boston Common featuring Boston Landmarks Orchestra. In 2016 the production traveled to Palo-Alto. In 2017 the opera-musical was produced in NYC's Blue Building, in a makeshift immersive production directed by Doug Fitch where audience members traveled alongside the actors and orchestra across five different spaces throughout the show. In summer 2017, the production traveled to the Edinburgh Fringe Festival. In 2019, a full orchestral version of the opera, with a revised libretto by Matthew Cole Kelly, premiered in Teatro Coccia, Novara (translated to Italian by Andrea Ascari) to great critical acclaim. The Italian album recording of Ami e Tami was released in January 2022 via Floating Tower Records.
The Drumf and the Rhinegold - a political satire on Donald Trump and the 2016 presidential election of the United States. An immersive opera-theater parody of Wagner’s Ring Cycle, ‘The Drumf and the Rhinegold’, was produced during the historic 2016 election, in collaboration with Doug Fitch, Claire Chase and members of International Contemporary Ensemble, starring Ariadne Greif as Melania. The work was initially conceived in collaboration with Tasha Gordon Solmon at the BMI Lehman Engel Musical Theatre Workshop.
Quill of the Soul — A musical tribute to Elie Wiesel, the Nobel Prize winning writer, educator and Holocaust scholar. The performance, co-produced by Boston University's Elie Wiesel Center and Boston Jewish Music Festival, and hosted by the WGBH, takes the Hasidic Niggun as its point of departure, exploring the surprising parallels between the Niggun and other world incantations.
Seekers of Light — A sequel to Kovler’s Here Comes Messiah!, Seekers of Light deals with the rise and fall of the mystical Jewish messiah of the 17th century, Shabtai Zvi, and is inspired by sketches by Theodor Tezhik. Featuring Parham Haghighi (Iran) and Tutti Druyan (Israel).
Here Comes Messiah! — a monodrama for soprano and chamber ensemble, commissioned by the Carnegie Hall in 2009 for the Golijov/Upshaw Workshop, is based on a musical motto from a Hassidic chant. A tour-de-force for a soprano singer, this theatrical score follows a young woman in the process of giving birth. Most recently, a new version of the piece, for soprano and full orchestra was premiered by soprano Reut Rivka and the Ukraine State Symphony conducted by Mykola Lisenko as part of GogolFest in Kyiv.
The Escape of Jonah — an oratorio for soloists, choir and brass orchestra, is a parody on the story of the prophet Jonah, from today’s perspective. The work juxtaposes the biblical text performed by the choir with the agitated speech of Jonah, the wandering Jew, impersonated by the trumpet.
Cokboy (A Jew Among The Indians) for actor and orchestra. A monodrama based on the story of a displaced Jew—in America—in search for his cultural identity. The work is based on Jerome Rothenberg’s post-Holocaust poem Cokboy (a Yiddish mispronunciation of cowboy), comparing the extinction of two cultures—the Eastern European Jews and the Native Americans.

== Life and work ==
Born in Moscow, Kovler is the paternal grandson of Russian operatic tenor and Yiddish singer Leonid Kovler and Russian pianist Roza Eidus. Kovler immigrated to Israel in 1990 with his family. He graduated from the Israel Arts & Science Academy, and the Jerusalem Academy of Music and moved to the United States in 2006 to continue his studies. He holds a doctorate from the New England Conservatory in Boston. Kovler taught at the New England Conservatory, and the Northeastern University. In 2014-2015 he was the Elie Wiesel Center composer in residence at the Boston University. As part of this residency, Kovler created Floating Tower Series. He is a member of the advanced BMI Lehman Engel Musical Theatre workshop, the foremost training ground for new musical theatre. Mátti is married and lives in Brooklyn, NY. In 2020, Kovler founded the Floating Tower Artist Retreat for refugee and immigrant musicians in North Adams, MA.

== Media ==
- Ami & Tami, Mátti Kovler's musical fable for children on Spotify
- Cokboy, a video excerpt from the Carnegie Hall performance
- Ami e Tami on Amazon (Italian version)
- Ami e Tami on Apple Music (Italian version)
- Quill of the Soul on Apple Music
