= Lipstikka =

2011 film

- Film poster
- אודם
- Directed by: Jonathan Sagall
- Written by: Jonathan Sagall
- Produced by: Jonathan Sagall
- Starring: Clara Khoury; Nataly Attiya
- Cinematography: Xiaosu Han; Andreas Thalhammer
- Edited by: Yuval Netter
- Release dates: 17 February 2011 (Berlinale); 1 March 2012 (Israel)
- Country: Israel
- Language: English

Lipstikka (Hebrew: אודם) is 2011 Israeli drama film directed by Jonathan Sagall. The film premiered In Competition at the 61st Berlin International Film Festival and was nominated for the Golden Bear.

== Cast ==
- Daniel Caltagirone
- Clara Khoury as Lara
- Nataly Attiya
- Waleed Akhtar as Raj
- Tali Knight
- John Harley as Radio Presenter (voice)
- David Loughlin as Andy
