= Edwin Seroussi =

Israeli musicologist of Uruguayan origin (born 1952)

- אדווין סרוסי
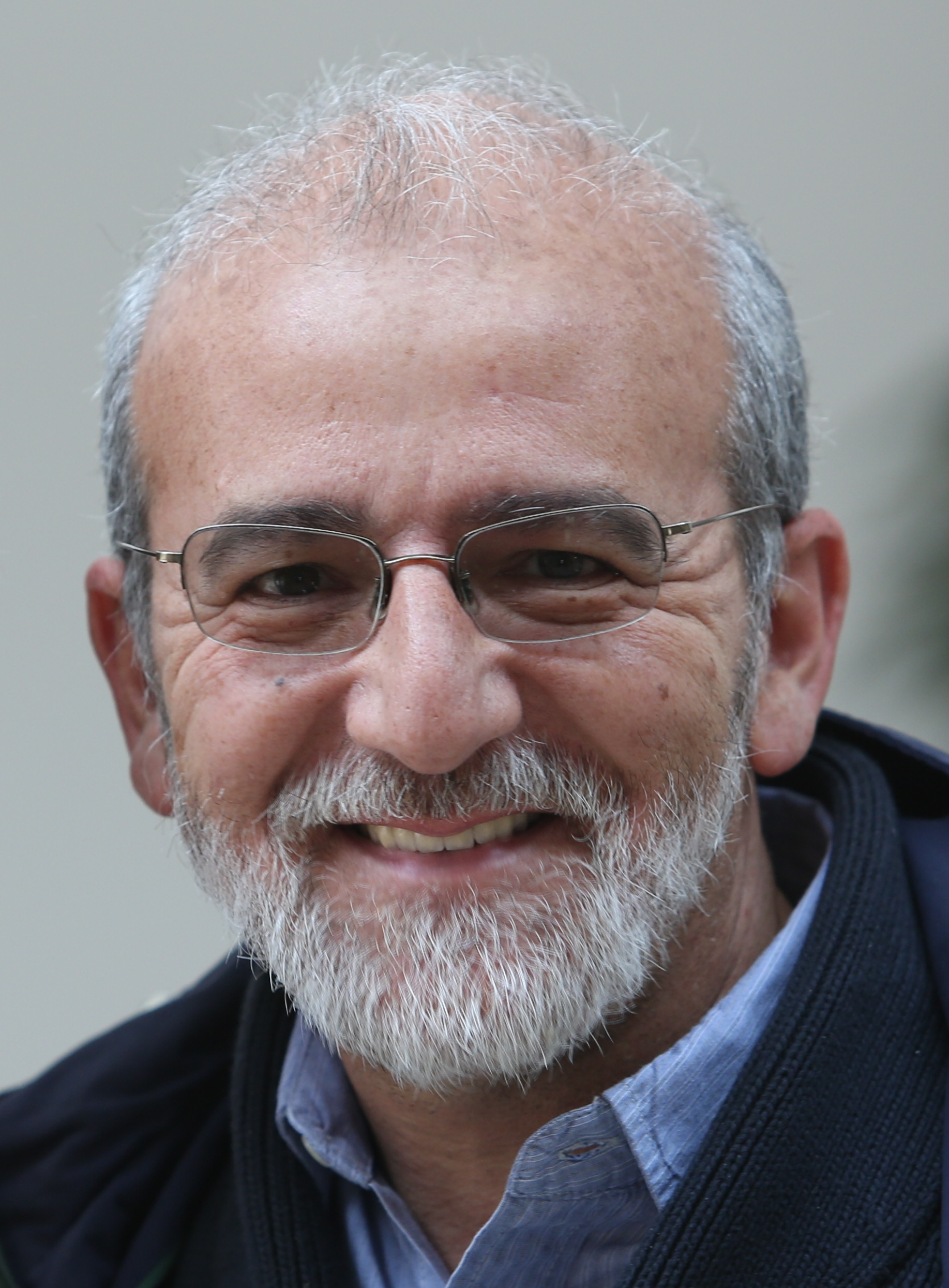
- Born: 26 December 1952 (age 73); Montevideo, Uruguay
- Occupation: Musicologist
- Awards: Israel Prize for Musicology (2018)

Edwin Seroussi Bargman (Hebrew: אדווין סרוסי; born 26 December 1952 in Montevideo) is an Israeli musicologist of Uruguayan origin. He is the Emanuel Alexandre Professor Emeritus of Musicology, chair of the Academic Committee of the Jewish Music Research Centre at the Hebrew University of Jerusalem and a visiting scholar in Jewish studies at Dartmouth College. He is the 2018 Israel Prize laureate in the field of Musicology. In 2024 he became a member of the Israel Academy of Sciences and Humanities

== Biography ==
Edwin Seroussi was born in Montevideo, Uruguay. In Montevideo he studied violin with Maestro Miguel Szilágyi Pauer and composition with Héctor Tosar Errecart. He immigrated to Israel in 1971 to study at the Department of Musicology of the Hebrew University at the undergraduate and graduate levels continuing into his doctoral studies at the Department of Music (today the UCLA Herb Alpert School of Music) of the University of California Los Angeles (1981–1987). Upon graduation he taught at Bar-Ilan University (1988–2000), transferring in 2000 to the Hebrew University. Parallel to his undergraduate studies in musicology he continued to pursue the study music composition with Prof. Andre Hajdu.

He founded and edits Yuval Music Series and is editor of the CD series Anthology of Music Traditions in Israel of the Jewish Music Research Centre (JMRC). As of 2025 he is acting as the chairman of the Centre.

== Areas of Research and Publications ==
Seroussi's earliest publications explored diverse aspects of the history and consolidation of Sephardic liturgical music (see for example: Spanish-Portuguese Synagogue Music in Reform Sources from Hamburg). At the same time, he started to explore the Judaeo-Spanish song repertoire, leading an international team in the editing of the Cancionero sefardí (1995) by Alberto Hemsi, one of the largest field collections of Sephardic songs from the pre-World War II period. Another line of historical research into the same repertoire led to the publication of Incipitario sefardí with the collaboration of Rivka Havassy. This volume records all the songs in Judaeo-Spanish mentioned as melody clues in collections of Hebrew sacred poetry in manuscript and printed. A series of articles on single Judeo-Spanish songs led to the publication of the monograph Ruinas sonoras de la modernidad: La canción popular sefardí en la era post-tradicional. A slightly updated English version of this monograph appeared as Sonic Ruins of Modernity" Judeo-Spanish Folksongs Today.

Parallel to his work on Sephardic music cultures, Seroussi turned his attention to popular music in Israel. Results of this research project appeared in the book that he co-authored with sociologist of culture Motti Regev, Popular Music and National Culture in Israel.

Beyond his specific areas of specialization, Seroussi has published essays on Jewish music in general, as well as on Judeo-Muslim relations in music.

== Digital Humanities ==
Seroussi initiated the development of Jewish Cultures Mapped, an online platform, in collaboration with computer scientist and vocal performing artist Dr. Josef Sprinzak and web graphic designer, researcher, educator and media activist Mushon Zer-Aviv (aka Shu'al). Launched by the research project Da'at Hamakom in 2017 and under the care of the Jewish Music Research Centre since late 2019. This interactive web-based map employs digital-mapping and information visualization technologies designed to explore and experience Jewish cultures in their historical development from a perspective of time and space. The map offers easy accessibility of high quality content to a wide range of publics, such as university researchers, school teachers, students and lay persons searching for information in a platform that differs from extant searching and data mining engines.

== See also ==
- Music of Israel
