= Ministry of Jerusalem Affairs (Palestine) =

Government ministry of Palestine

Agency overview
- Formed: 1996
- Jurisdiction: Government of Palestine
- Headquarters: Ramallah, Palestine
- Minister responsible: Ashraf al-Awar, Minister of Jerusalem Affairs

The Ministry of Jerusalem Affairs is a government ministry in Palestine. The Ministry of Jerusalem Affairs was established with the aim of facilitating all economic and societal means and possibilities to support the survival of the Palestinian-Arab presence within the city of Jerusalem, and to create a positive reality that stimulates an end to the Israeli occupation of Jerusalem and the establishment of a Palestinian state with East Jerusalem as its capital. The Palestine Liberation Organization (PLO) established the Jerusalem Affairs Department as one of its central departments, based on the statute, at a meeting of the Executive Committee held in Ramallah in September 2008, in order to follow up on the affairs of Jerusalem, preserve its Arabness, and support the steadfastness of its people.

== Functions ==
The Ministry of Jerusalem Affairs aims to keep the issue of Jerusalem a central and fixed item on its agenda and concerns at all national, Arab, international and negotiating levels, and works to preserve its Arabism and sanctities, affirm its status as the capital of the State of Palestine, confront the ongoing process of Judaization and ethnic cleansing in the country, and provide the necessary financial resources to protect Jerusalem and support the steadfastness of its people.

As part of its mission and vision, it works to protect Jerusalem from Israelization, Judaization and policies of ethnic cleansing, and to support the steadfastness of its citizens, by developing plans, programs and general policies within the framework of the official political position of the Palestine Liberation Organization (PLO) based on the resolutions of the Palestinian National Council, resolutions of international legitimacy and other resolutions related to Jerusalem, and working to implement them, and seeking to add Security Council Resolution 252 to all the official letters, in connection with Security Council Resolution 242 and other resolutions in all Arab and international forums. Sponsoring and protecting the interests of the people of Jerusalem through the development and activation of the relationship of the Jerusalem Affairs Department with all ministries, institutions and bodies of the Palestinian National Authority concerned with providing services to citizens, as well as developing and activating relations with national NGOs working in this field, and with donors, whether they are countries, international organizations, non-governmental organizations or popular committees, in order to urge them to provide the necessary financial assistance for Jerusalem and its institutions, preserve its identity, support the steadfastness of its children from displacement, and enhance its position and status as the capital of Palestine.

== Duties and powers ==
1. Strengthening the Palestinian identity in the school curriculum.
2. Awareness and mass mobilization to enhance the spirit of national belonging.
3. Encouraging national events.
4. Opposing the Judaization of Jerusalem.
5. Empowering institutions (youth, feminism, etc.) in steadfastness and continuity.
6. Building national capacities for various community groups.
7. Raising the level of services and support provided to Jerusalemite (logistical, legal, economic, social, and political).
8. Unifying the references (official and unofficial).
9. Strengthening accountability mechanisms for violators.
10. Monitoring and documenting Israeli violations (locally, regionally, internationally).
11. Defending religious and historical institutions (Islamic and Christian).
12. Strengthening and building a partnership relationship with countries and international organizations, regional and Arab.

== List of ministers ==
#	Name	Party	Government	Term start	Term end	Notes
Minister of Jerusalem Affairs
1	Faisal Husseini	Fatah	2, 3	17 May 1996	13 June 2002	
Minister of State for Jerusalem Affairs
—	Ziad Abuzayyad	Independent	3	9 August 1998	13 June 2002	
Minister of Jerusalem Affairs
	Vacant		4, 5, 6, 7, 8	13 June 2002	24 February 2005	
Minister of State for Jerusalem Affairs
—	Hind Khoury	Independent	9	24 February 2005	29 March 2006	
—	Khaled Abu Arafeh	Hamas	10	29 March 2006	17 March 2007	
Minister of Jerusalem Affairs
	Vacant		11, 12	17 March 2007	19 May 2009	
2	Hatem Abd al-Qader	Fatah	13	19 May 2009	30 June 2009	
	Vacant		13	30 June 2009	16 May 2012	
3	Adnan al-Husayni	Independent	14, 15, 16, 17	16 May 2012	13 April 2019	
4	Fadi al-Hadami	Independent	18	13 April 2019	31 March 2024	
5	Ashraf al-Awar	Independent	19	31 March 2024	Incumbent	

== See also ==
- Status of Jerusalem
