= Second Person Singular =

Novel by Sayed Kashua

- First edition (Hebrew)
- Author: Sayed Kashua
- Original title: גוף שני יחיד / Guf sheni yaḥid
- Translator: Mitch Ginsburg
- Language: Hebrew
- Published: 2010 (Keter) (Hebrew); 2012 (GrovePress) (English)
- Publication place: Israel
- Pages: 318 (paperback edition) (Hebrew); 352 (hardcover edition) (English)
- ISBN: 9789650718381 (Hebrew); ISBN 9780802120199 (English)

Second Person Singular (Hebrew: גוף שני יחיד, romanized: gof shani yehid) is a 2010 novel by the Palestinian writer Sayed Kashua. Kashua explores the identity of Arabs who are assimilated in Israeli culture; Arabs that speak Hebrew and had their education at Israeli institutes.

== Plot ==
Second Person Singular follows two Arab men, a successful criminal attorney and a social worker, whose fates meet in a curious way.

The lawyer has a flourishing office in West Jerusalem where he has two fellow Arabs jurists working for him: Tariq and Samaah. Tariq also works as a criminal attorney, Samaah works as his secretary. Although Samaah studied law, her diploma from the University of Jordan is not recognized in Israel. Furthermore, the lawyer thought it would be useful to have the daughter of a high ranking Fatah member working for him.

In an effort to sustain his image as a sophisticated Israeli Arab, the lawyer visits a local bookstore every Thursday to buy novels that he read about in the literary supplement of his newspaper. On one evening, he buys a second-hand copy of Tolstoy's The Kreutzer Sonata. His wife once asked him about this book, because it was mentioned all the time during her psychology lectures on Freud. Inside he finds a small white note in Arabic in his wife's handwriting that looks like a love letter. In a blind rage over the presumed betrayal the lawyer decides to hunt down the previous owner of the book. The previous owner – named Yonathan – had his name written down on the first page of the book.

Meanwhile a second plot-line unfolds about an Arab named Amir. Amir works as a social worker in Jerusalem. One day a beautiful new intern, Laila, turns up at his office. After they go to a dance together where coincidentally all his coworkers are Amir decides to quit his job. Laila left him a note in the office explaining how she enjoyed the night and asking if he would call her back.

Amir had already taken up a second job, caring for a Jewish young man named Yonathan who is in a permanent vegetative state. Since he can't afford his rent anymore with only one job, Amir moves in with Yonathan and his mother. Amir and Yonathan look similar enough for Amir to assume Yonathan's identity. Amir uses his new Jewish identity to get into the prestigious Bezalel art school. After Yonathan dies, Yonathan is buried under Amir's name and Amir keeps the identity of Yonathan.

The lawyer's research leads him to Amir and he confronts him about his assumed identity. Laila turns out to be the wife of the lawyer. Both she and Amir, tell the same story that they never met each other after the dance. This dance took place before she and the lawyer had met. The lawyer is satisfied with the explanation and resumes his normal activity.

In the epilogue, the lawyer visits an exposition of all the graduates of the Bezalel. When he finds the photographs Amir (under Yonathan's name) made there is a photograph of a naked woman who, he would swear, was Laila.

== Publication history ==
- 2010, Israel, Keter ISBN 9789650718381, Paperback
- 2012, United States, GrovePress ISBN 9780802120199, Pub date 3 April 2012, Translated by: Mitch Ginsburg, Hardback
- 2012, Netherlands, Ambo Anthos ISBN 9789041418371, Pub date May 2012, Translated by: Ruben Verhasselt Paperback
- 2013, Germany, Berlin Verlag ISBN 9783833308741, Pub date 14 January 2013, Translated by: Mirjam Pressler, Paperback
- 2013, Italy, Neri Pozza ISBN 978-88-545-0667-1, Translated by: Elena Loewenthal

== Reception ==
Second Person Singular was well received, both in the Israeli and the International press.

== Awards and nominations ==
Second Person Singular has won the Bernstein Prize in 2011. It was shortlisted for the Sapir Prize in 2010.
