= Israel Arts and Science Academy =

Coordinates: 31°45′05″N 35°10′37″E

- Hebrew: בית הספר התיכון הישראלי למדעים ולאמנויות
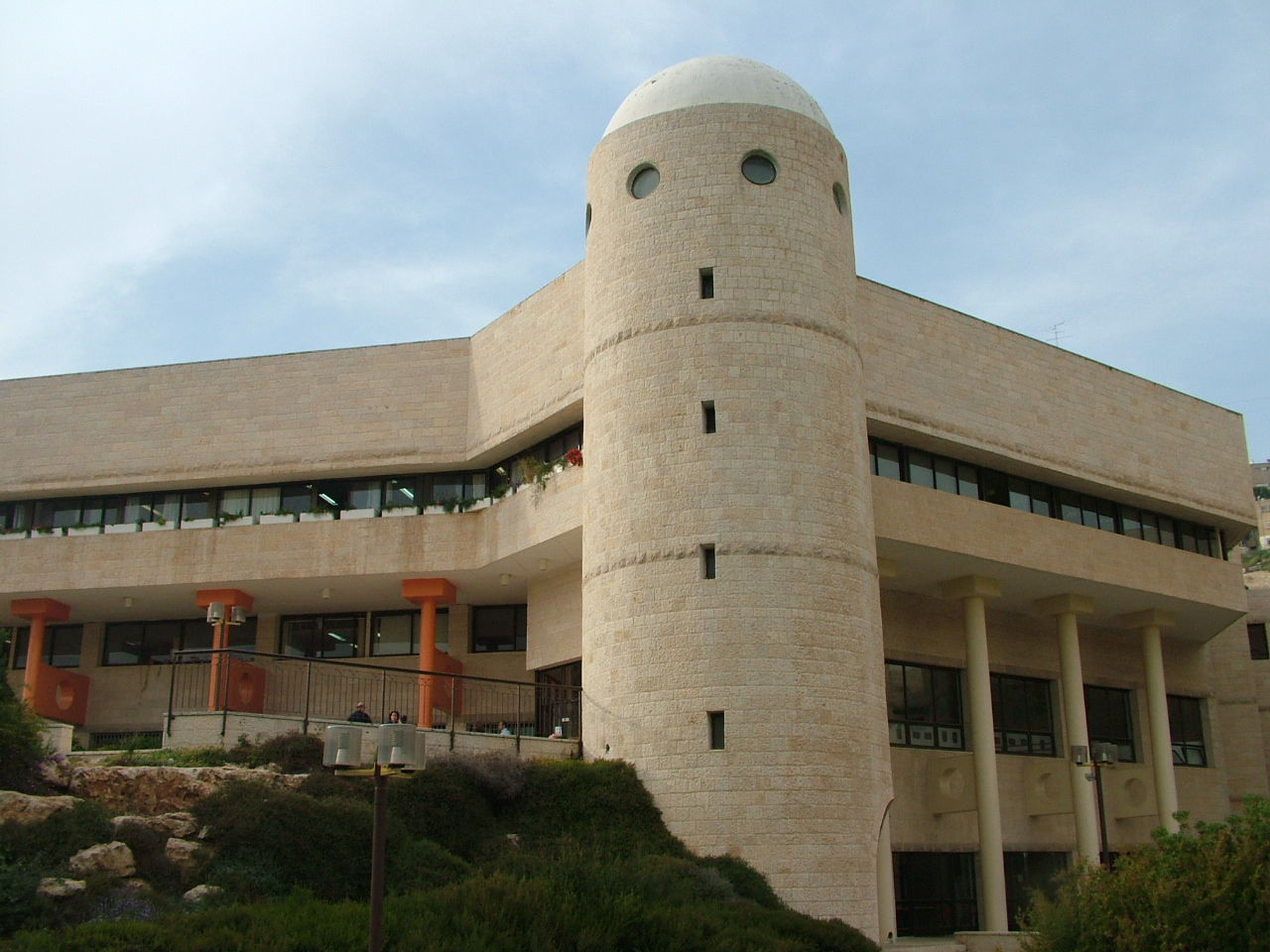

Information
- Established: 1990; 36 years ago
- Enrollment: c.300
- Website: school.iasa.org.il

Israel Arts and Science Academy (IASA) (Hebrew: בית הספר התיכון הישראלי למדעים ולאמנויות) is an Israeli boarding school for gifted high school students.

== History ==
The Israel Arts and Science Academy (Beit Hasefer Ha'tichon Hayisraeli Lemada'im Vela'omanuyot) was founded in September 1990 by Mary Jane and Robert H. Asher and Raphi Amram. The students are religious and secular Jews, Israeli Arabs, Christians and Druze. They come from over 100 communities across Israel. The student body numbers approximately 300, including day students from Jerusalem, in addition to residential students.

IASA students are accepted without regard for their financial ability; 70% receive scholarship assistance. Admission is based solely on merit. IASA's goals are excellence, leadership and community service.

Students may major in either natural sciences, music, visual arts, or humanities, though they study most subjects (those which are not related to their area of interest) in mixed classes. The science students choose one main subject, such as physics, chemistry, or biology, and they must also learn computer science and/or another subject.

IASA's Music Department was shaped by the visions of three educators: Israeli composer and ethnomusicologist Andre Hajdu (student of Zoltán Kodály, Olivier Messiaen and Darius Milhaud), composer and educator Michael Wolpe, and teacher of ear-training Bat Sheva Rubinstein. The Music Department has produced a generation of young Israeli musicians.

The studies in the Art Department consist of painting, sculpting, photography, and video art classes. Students also study the history of modern art and classic art. In their second year, students write their own academic paper about any art topic they choose. In their third year, students work on their final practical exhibit.

The Humanities Department was opened in the 2007–2008 school year. It was opened in a partial experimental format in 2006-2007. The students learn by the "Great books" curriculum, which emphasizes reading primary sources, group discussions, commentary, analysis and academic writing. The department's "Unique Program" includes several courses arranged in a chrono-historical order, from Ancient Greece to the Modern Era. Each course has a different dominant discipline, but the program is interdisciplinary in its nature. The students submit during every course several academic papers. Besides this program, the students must fulfill three other requirements:

- Study of a second foreign language: Besides the mandatory English studies in Israel's school system, The Department's students are obliged to learn Arabic, or Latin. Students with a background knowledge of another language may learn it instead.
- Enhanced studies of two subjects: The student may choose from History, Literature, Jewish thought and Philosophy. A student who wishes to study an exact science may do so within the Science Department's "secondary science" studies.
- Writing a final dissertation: The students write a thesis in any field of knowledge of the humanities. Dissertations are held to a high academic standard, and are written under the instruction of M.A.s and PhD.s from academic institutes and from the school's staff. Students often participate and win in competitions for remarkable dissertations held by the Ministry of Education and other research institutes.

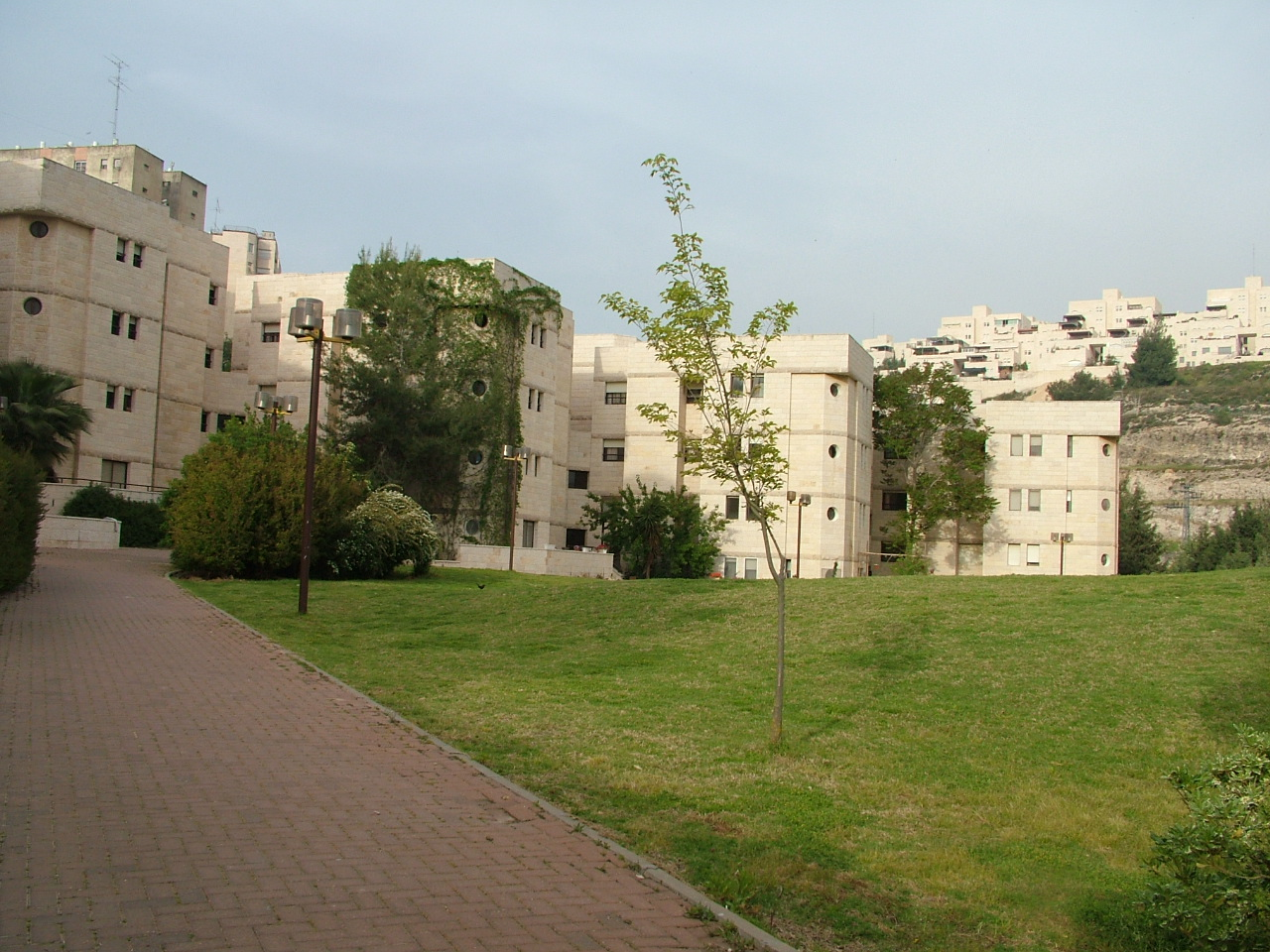
Israel Arts and Science Academy dormitories

The students often go on school trips, usually to locations which are relevant to the "Unique Program" studies (e.g. Judaean Desert, Jerusalem's Old City).

== Alumni ==
Notable alumni include the Israeli Arab journalist Sayed Kashua; composers Aviya Kopelman and Matti Kovler; historian Yair Mintzker; and Eran Shir, the founder of Dapper. Inc.

Saying that following Israel's actions in Gaza, "courageous civic activism" had become necessary, dozens of IASA graduates published a letter in December 2014 calling on Israelis to refuse serving in the IDF, become conscientious objectors and stop what they view as oppression of Palestinians. Deputy Education Minister Avi Wortzman protested the letter, saying, "The signers of the letter are using the name of the school to gain media attention, and this is a terrible act".

== See also ==
- Education in Israel
