= Andre Hajdu =

Hungarian-born Israeli composer and ethnomusicologist

André Hajdu
- אנדרה היידו
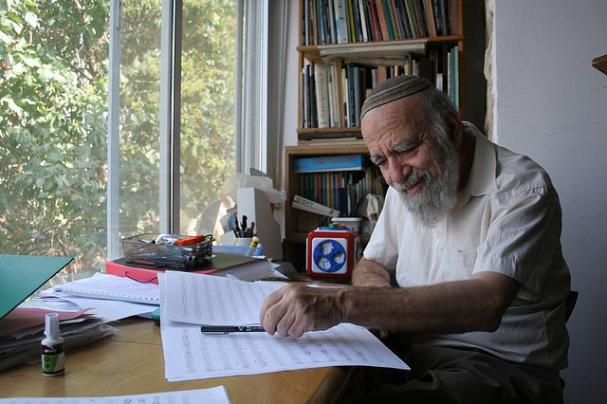
- André Hajdu at work
- Born: 5 March 1932; Hungary
- Died: 1 August 2016 (aged 84); Israel
- Occupations: Composer, Ethnomusicologist
- Awards: First prize for Gypsy Cantata, World Festival of Youth, Warsaw (1955); Israel Prize (1997)

Academic work
- Notable students: Mátti Kovler; Matan Porat; Aharon Razel; Yonatan Razel; Yoni Rechter; Edwin Seroussi; Gil Shohat

André Hajdu (Hungarian: Hajdú András; Hebrew: אנדרה היידו; 5 March 1932 – 1 August 2016) was a Hungarian-born Israeli composer and ethnomusicologist.

== Biography ==
Hajdu studied at the Franz Liszt Academy of Music in Budapest with Endre Szervánszky and Ferenc Szabó (composition), Erno Szégedi (piano), and Zoltán Kodály (ethnomusicology). As a Kodály disciple, he was involved for two years in research about Gypsy musical culture and published several articles on this subject.

After the Hungarian Revolution of 1956, Hajdu escaped to Paris and continued his studies at the Paris Conservatoire with Darius Milhaud (composition) and Olivier Messiaen (philosophy of music), obtaining the 1st prize in the discipline. Among his class mates were Gilbert Amy, William Bolcom, Philip Corner and Paul Méfano. In Paris he met a variety of stimulating people from the playwright Samuel Beckett to Prof. Israel Adler of the Hebrew University, who brought him on his first visit to Israel in 1966.

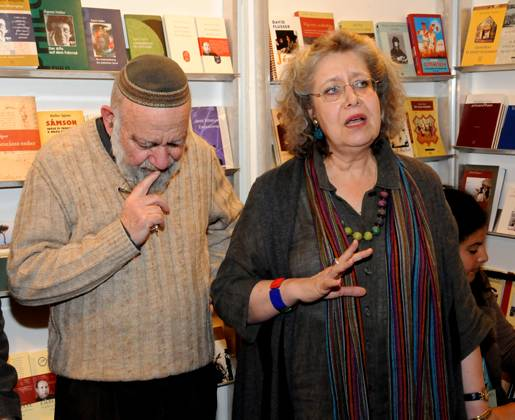
Hajdu with Mira Zakai in Jerusalem, in 2009

Hajdu took up residence in Jerusalem in 1966. He taught at the Tel Aviv Music Academy from 1966 to 1991 and at Bar-Ilan University since 1970. He served as chairman in the Music Department there and founded a composition department. His notable students have included Aharon Razel, Gil Shohat, Yonatan Razel, Yoni Rechter, Matti Kovler and Matan Porat.

Hajdu composed many pedagogical works, particularly for piano and theory through a creative approach (involving the player to the process of composing) e.g. Milky Way, Art of Piano-playing, Book of Challenges, Concerto for 10 young pianists. All this is connected with the practice of creative teaching in the Israel Arts & Science Academy in Jerusalem, an experimental school for a new approach to music teaching. He also studied Jewish Klezmer and Hassidic repertories and published several articles on this subject. He was deeply involved in Jewish topics, not only on the usual folkloristic or liturgical levels, but also confronted more abstract subjects of Jewish thought (Oral Law, philosophical books of the Bible) as well as Jewish History. In 2005 he received the title of Doctor Honoris Causa of Jerusalem Hebrew University.

Hajdu died in Jerusalem at age 84.

== Awards ==
- In 1955, Hajdu won the first prize with his Gypsy Cantata at the competition of the World Festival of Youth in Warsaw.
- In 1997, he was awarded the Israel Prize, for music.

== Selected works ==
For the Stage

- Ludus Paschalis, a medieval passover play (1970)
- The Story of Jonas, Opera for children's choir (1985–1987)
- Koheleth (Ecclesiaste), a biblical recitation with 4 celli

Orchestral

- Petit enfer (1959)
- The Unbearable Intensity of Youth (1976)
- Bashful Serenades for clarinet and orchestra (1979)
- On Light and Depth (1983–1984)
- Concerto for an Ending Century for piano and orchestra (1990)
- Continuum for 15 players and piano (1995)

Strings

- Truath Melech (Rhapsody on Jewish Themes) for clarinet and string orchestra (1974)
- The False Prophet for narrator and string orchestra (1977)
- Divertimento (1988)
- Overture in Form of a Kite (1985)

Chamber

- 5 Sketches in Sentimental Mood for piano quartet (1976)
- Instants suspendus for violin, viola or cello solo (1978)
- Sonatine à la française (Sonatina in French Style) for flute and cello (1990)
- Variations for string quartet (1997)
- Birth of a Niggun for flute, clarinet and piano (1998)
- Mishna-Variations for string quartet (1998)
- Music for Three for violin, cello and piano (1999)

Piano

- Plasmas (1957)
- Diary from Sidi-Bou Said (1960)
- Journey around My Piano (1963)
- Noir sur blanc (1988)
- Metamorphoses (1997)
- 5 Inventions for piano 4-hands (1983)

Songs

- The Floating Tower (Mishnayoth) (1972–1973)
- Bestiary (Ted Hughes) (1993)
- Merry Feet (1998)
- Nursery Songs

Vocal-orchestral

- Cycles of Life, Cantata (1985)
- Dreams of Spain (1991); about the expulsion of the Jews from Spain
- Job and His Comforters, Biblical and Historical Oratorio (1995)

Choral

- House of Shaul for mixed chorus (1974)
- The Question of the Sons (1974)
- Bitzinioth Nov (Song of the Sea) (1973)
- Mishnayoth (1972–1973)
- Proverbs of Solomon for choir and percussion (1978)

== Discography ==
- On Light and Depth. I.M.I. (Israel)
- Ecclesiaste R.C.A. Victor (France)
- Dreams of Spain – Hungaroton (Budapest, HCD31872). Tzveta Hristoforou (alto), Vesselin Hristov (tenor), Hristo Tschemedjiev (narrator), Sofia Festival Orchestra, Sofia Festival Choir, Sofia Boy's Choir; Nayden Todorov, conductor.
- Concerto for an ending century – Hungaroton (Budapest, HCD31872). Omer Arieli (piano), Sofia Festival Orchestra; Nayden Todorov, conductor.
- Truath Melech. Plane (Germany)
- Book of Challenges (Israel)
- Retro-Portrait (Israel)
- Music For Chamber Ensembles (Israel)
- Jewish Rhapsody (Teru'at Melekh) for Clarinet and Orchestra. Orit Orbach (clarinet & bass clarinet), Plovdiv Philharmonic Orchestra; Nayden Todorov, conductor. Music Minus One.

== See also ==
- Music of Israel
- Orit Wolf

== Sources ==
- Kennedy, Michael (2006). The Oxford Dictionary of Music, second edition. Oxford and New York: Oxford University Press. ISBN 0-19-861459-4
- Schleifer, Eliyahu (2001). "Hajdu, André". The New Grove Dictionary of Music and Musicians, second edition, edited by Stanley Sadie and John Tyrrell. London: Macmillan Publishers.

== See also ==
- List of Israel Prize recipients
