= Bero Beyer =

Dutch film producer

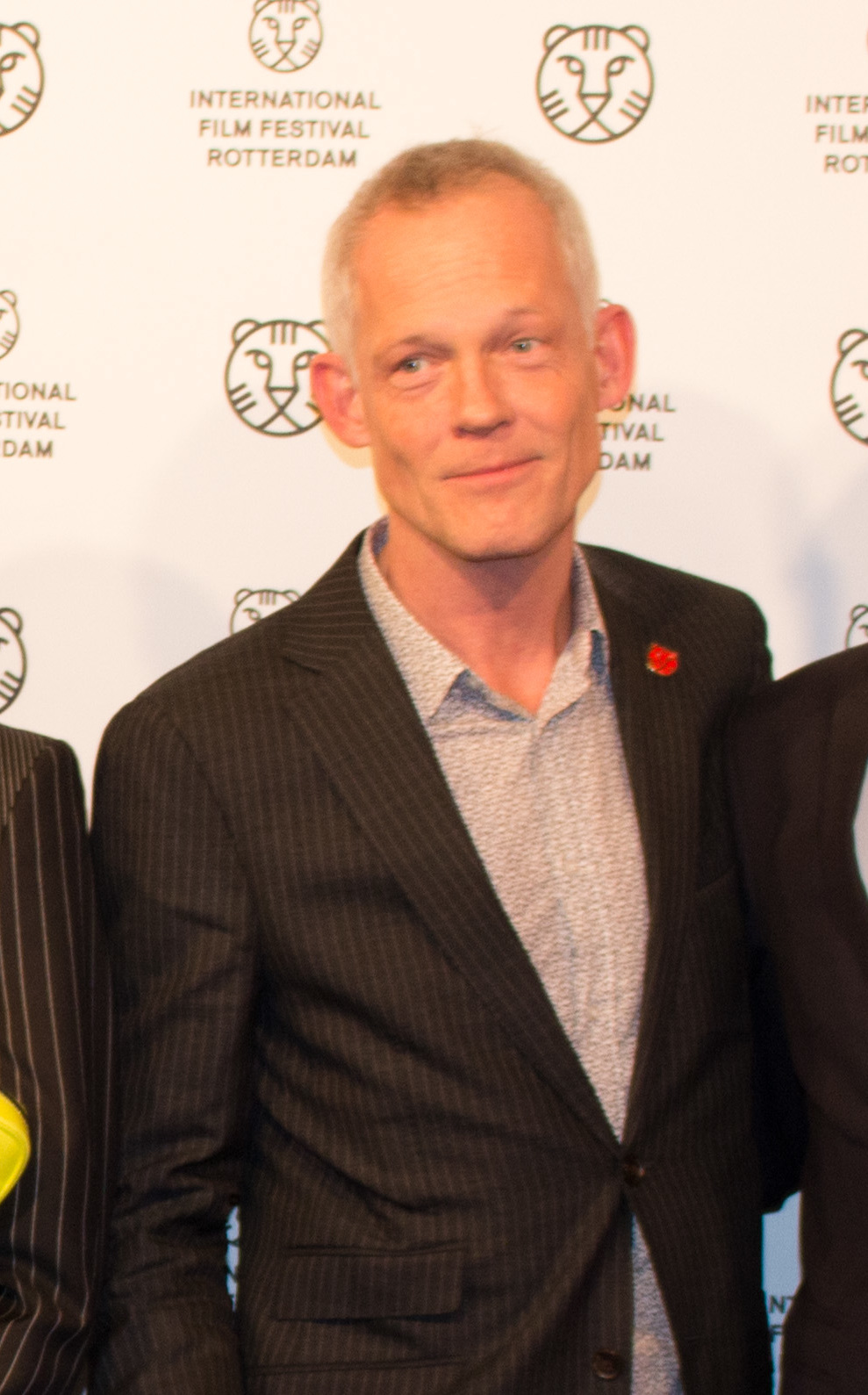
- Bero Beyer at the 49th International Film Festival Rotterdam, 2020
- Born: 12 November 1970 (age 55); Bremerhaven, Germany
- Occupation: Film producer
- Years active: 2005–present
- Known for: Former festival director of IFFR

Bero Beyer (born 12 November 1969) is a Dutch film producer.

Born to a Dutch seafaring captain and a German mother, he moved with his family to Capelle aan den IJssel when he was six months old and grew up in Berkel en Rodenrijs. In 1993 he graduated from the Art Academy Rotterdam. In 2005 he was the co-writer and co-producer of Paradise Now, for which he won a European Film Award for Best Screenwriter. He was the director of the International Film Festival Rotterdam between 2015 and 2020.
