= Sayed Kashua =

Palestinian author and journalist (born 1975)

- سيد قشوع סייד קשוע
- Born: 1975 (age 50–51); Tira, Israel
- Education: Hebrew University of Jerusalem; Washington University in St. Louis
- Occupations: author and journalist
- Employer(s): University of Illinois Urbana-Champaign; Washington University in St. Louis

Sayed Kashua (Arabic: سيد قشوع, Hebrew: סייד קשוע; born 1975) is an author and journalist. He is a Palestinian citizen of Israel, born in Tira, Israel. He is known for his books and humorous columns in Hebrew and English.

== Early life ==
Kashua was born in Tira in the Triangle region of Israel to Palestinian Muslim-Arab parents. In 1990, he was accepted to a prestigious boarding school in Jerusalem – Israel Arts and Science Academy. He studied sociology and philosophy at the Hebrew University of Jerusalem. Kashua was a resident of Beit Safafa before moving to a Jewish neighborhood of Jerusalem with his wife and children.

Kashua became a journalist, columnist and screenwriter, especially of TV series. In 2002 he published his first novel, Dancing Arabs.

His Haaretz column of July 4, 2014 was titled "Why Sayed Kashua is Leaving Jerusalem and Never Coming Back: Everything people had told him since he was a teenager is coming true. Jewish–Arab co-existence has failed." It was published at a volatile time in the country's intergroup relations, involving the kidnapping/murders of Jewish students in the West Bank and an Arab youth in East Jerusalem, though prior to the July 8 outbreak of the 2014 Israel–Gaza conflict. His declaration elicited numerous responses in the Israeli press from colleagues and readers who were concerned by the issues he raises. Kashua's concern for his family and despair at the Jewish-Israeli community's continued rejection of Arab-Israelis despite his 25 years of writing motivated his move to the United States. In his Haaretz newspaper column, he wrote that "I'd lost my small war" and that he saw no hope of a world for his children where Arab- and Jewish-Israelis could coexist.

== Academic career ==
Kashua accepted teaching positions in Champaign-Urbana, Illinois and Chicago, moving there with his wife and three children for the 2014/15 academic year. Kashua began teaching at the University of Illinois through the Israeli Studies Project, a sponsorship program for Israeli writers and scholars run by Illinois and the Jewish Federation of Metropolitan Chicago. He served as a visiting clinical professor from 2014 to 2018. He participated in the Creative Writing program's bilingualism workshop at the University of Chicago, and was a clinical professor in the Israel Studies program.

In the summer of 2018, Kashua and his family moved to St. Louis, Missouri, for Kashua to enroll in the PhD program of Comparative Literature in Arts and Sciences at Washington University in St. Louis, and also taught Hebrew for the Department of Jewish, Islamic, and Near Eastern Languages & Cultures.

As of 2026, Kashua is a professor of the practice at Boston University's college of communication.

== Literary career ==
Kashua's exposure to literature began at the Israel Arts and Science Academy when he was 14 years old. After reading The Catcher in the Rye, he discovered a passion for books and began writing himself, primarily about the Arabic narrative in a Jewish country. Kashua wrote with the goal of creating a more equal Israel. His first novel, Dancing Arabs (2002), tells the story of a nameless Arab-Israeli attending an elite Jewish boarding school and code-switching between Arab and Jewish identities in an attempt to fit in. These semi-autobiographical themes of identity and in-betweenness, often packaged in the tragic comedy genre, became hallmarks of Kashua's writing. Throughout the years, Kashua's fiction often uses stereotypical characters – caricatures of Jewish- and Arab-Israelis – to both foster familiarity with his audience and subvert the perception of these identities in real life.

From the beginning of his career as a writer, Kashua wrote exclusively in Hebrew, although he had grown up speaking exclusively Arabic. This was an intentional choice on his part in reaction to the poor representation of Palestinian characters in Hebrew books at his school library. Kashua wanted to "tell the Israelis ... the Palestinian story", and he does this by using "humor, sarcasm, and absurdity to appeal to readers and utilizes popular media such as television and journalism".

His primary vehicle of communication was a personal weekly column in Hebrew for Haaretz and a local Jerusalem weekly, Ha'Ir. In a humorous, tongue-in-cheek style, his column embedded political and social commentaries about problems faced by Arab-Israelis into anecdotes about parenting and day-to-day life. In one such piece, Kashua pondered one's ability to truly integrate into a new culture while recounting mundane yet familiarly realistic conversations between family members. He uses the perspective of his children to highlight the absurdity of social norms, such as his daughter's sad confession that she knows she will "always be an Arab" to the rest of Israeli society. By writing in Hebrew for a mainstream news platform, Kashua exposed a Jewish-Israeli audience to the Arab-Israeli experience.

In his Haaretz article announcing his move to the United States, Kashua anticipated having to switch again to writing in English "about a far-off land in which children are shot, slaughtered, buried and burned", although "the readers will probably think I am a fantasy writer". He did not think Hebrew speakers would care to read his work for much longer. While he has begun to publish in English, beginning two weeks later with an article for The Observer about his leaving Israel, he continued his Haaretz column. He also wrote his most recent novel, Track Changes, in Hebrew; an English translation was published in 2020.

Kashua ended his Haaretz column in November 2017, announcing his hiatus in a final column entitled "Sayed Kashua Bids Adieu: The Perils of Being an Arab-Israeli Writer”. It detailed his view of the role of a Palestinian writer and his hopes for Israel's future. Today, Kashua continues to publish opinion pieces through various platforms, including The Guardian, The New Yorker, and The New York Times.

== Media career ==
=== Television ===
Avoda Aravit (2007), or in English, Arab Labor, is a satirical sitcom written by Kashua and aired on Israel's Channel 2. A large part of the dialogue is in Arabic with Hebrew subtitles. The show is about a young Arab couple, Amjad (Norman Issa) and Bushra (Clara Khoury), and their young daughter, who live in an Arab village on the outskirts of Jerusalem. Amjad is a journalist working for a Hebrew newspaper (much like Haaretz) who desperately seeks to assimilate into the prevailing Israeli Jewish cultural milieu with mixed and hilarious results. The show holds a mirror up to the racism and ignorance on both sides of the ethnic divide and has been compared with the All in the Family series in the United States. The show received overwhelmingly positive reviews, winning awards for Best Comedy, Best Lead Actor in a Comedy, Best Lead Actress in a Comedy, Best Director, and Best Screenplay at the 2013 Israeli Academy of Film and Television awards.

In the auto-fictional drama The Writer (2015), the character Kateb draws on his own experiences for his depiction of the turbulent daily life of a young Arab and his family living in Israel. However, the more successful his satirical TV series becomes, the more Kateb feels alienated from his alter ego.

Madrasa (2023) is a comic series taking place at an Arabic-Hebrew bilingual school in Jerusalem.

=== Film ===
- Dancing Arabs (2014)
- A film adaptation of Kashua's second novel, Let It Be Morning, was slated to begin production in early 2017. The film was completed and released in 2022. The screenplay was written and the film was directed by Eran Kolirin. Most of the cast are Palestinian and the film is mostly in Arabic.

== Reception ==
=== Praise ===
Kashua is highly acclaimed internationally, often praised for his frankness and "striking satire". Reviews of Native, his 2016 collection of personal essays, commend the universality of his human message and its artful presentation through comedy. The winner of many international awards, Kashua has been lauded as the "greatest living Hebrew writer".

=== Criticism ===
Critics of Kashua accuse him of hypocrisy and cynicism. One article in The Jerusalem Post lambasted him for being unappreciative of the freedoms offered to Arabs in Israel. Track Changes has been criticized as "rambling" and "self-pity[ing]". His choice to write exclusively in Hebrew has also garnered him criticism, estranging him from Israeli Arabs who see the Arabic language as the primary means with which to preserve their Arabic identity; Kashua lamented in an interview that he is no longer welcome in his hometown of Tira. The content of Kashua's Haaretz column has also led to controversy. In one such instance, after director Maysaloun Hamoud became victim to threats and verbal abuse, Kashua issued an apology column for his column criticizing the director's film and emphasized the importance of engaging with thought-provoking material and standing with the filmmakers to "silence the violence".

== Published works ==
- Dancing Arabs (2002)
- Let it be Morning (2006)
- Second Person Singular (2010) (also published as Exposure (2013))
- Native: Dispatches from an Israeli-Palestinian Life (2016), was shortlisted for the Grand Prix of Literary Associations 2017, Research Category.
- Track Changes (2017)

== Documentaries ==
A 2009 documentary film (directed and written by Dorit Zimbalist, produced by Barak Heymann and Dorit Zimbalist), Sayed Kashua — Forever Scared, documents the upheavals and events that changed Kashua's life over a period of seven years.

== Awards and recognition ==
- 2004 – Prime Minister's Prize for Hebrew Literary Works
- 2004 – Grinzane Cavour Prize for First Novel (Italy) for his novel Dancing Arabs
- 2006 – Lessing Prize for Critics (Germany).
- 2010 – Kugel Prize for literature, awarded by the Municipality of Holon
- 2010 – Freedom of Expression Award of the San Francisco Jewish Film Festival (USA)
- 2011 – Award for Best Television Series at the Jerusalem Film Festival for Arab Labor
- 2011 – Bernstein Prize for the novel Second Person Singular
- 2012 – Prix des lecteurs du Var readers' prize at the Var Book Fair (Toulon, Var department, France), for Second Person Singular
