= Israelization =

Assimilation processes among minority groups in Israel

Israelization or Israelisation (Hebrew: ישראליזציה, romanized: Yisraelizátzya), also called Israelification, is a sociological term for the process in which minority groups in Israel adopt the lifestyle, language, culture, political and other characteristics of the dominant population in Israel.

== Overview ==
The term is often used to describe the changes in the lifestyle and culture of the Arab citizens of Israel since Israel's creation. In this context, the term "Palestinization" describes the opposite process – resistance to Israelization and strengthening political and cultural ties with Palestinians. However, sociologist Majid Al-Haj suggests these are not contradictory processes, and that there is an emergence of two parallel identities among Palestinian citizens of Israel which he called "Politicization". The equivalent term in Arabic is "Asralah" (أسرلة) derived from the name of "Israel" in Arabic (إسرائيل - Aisraail).

Israelization has been noted amongst the Druze community in Israel. One study noted a trend whereas the post-1950 Druze generation the younger the generation is, the likelier that there is a preference for Hebrew instead of Arabic with many younger Druze using social media having a near absence of Arabic usage amongst other Druze peers.

The term "Israelization" is also used occasionally to describe the social and political changes in Haredi society in Israel, in particular to describe integration into the Israeli political system, their increasing use of the general media in the Hebrew language, integration into the Israeli labor market etc. In addition, it is sometimes used to describe the assimilation of Jewish immigrants to Israel (Aliyah) among the native-born Israelis and amongst the veterans Jewish immigrants.
