= Paradise Now =

2005 film by Hany Abu-Assad

- Theatrical release poster
- Directed by: Hany Abu-Assad
- Written by: Hany Abu-Assad; Bero Beyer; Pierre Hodgson
- Produced by: Bero Beyer
- Starring: Kais Nashef; Ali Suliman; Lubna Azabal; Hiam Abbass
- Cinematography: Antoine Héberlé
- Edited by: Sander Vos
- Music by: Jina Sumedi
- Distributed by: A-Film Distribution (Netherlands); Constantin Film (Germany and Austria); Haut et Court (France)
- Release date: 14 February 2005
- Running time: 91 minutes
- Countries: Netherlands; Palestine; Germany; France
- Languages: Palestinian Arabic; English
- Budget: $2 million
- Box office: $3.5 million

Paradise Now (Arabic: الجنّة الآن, romanized: al-Janna al-Laan) is a 2005 psychological drama film directed by Hany Abu-Assad. It follows the story of two Palestinian men preparing for a suicide attack in Israel. The film won the Golden Globe Award for Best Foreign Language Film and received an Academy Award nomination in the same category.

According to Abu-Assad, "The film is an artistic point of view of that political issue. The politicians want to see it as black and white, good and evil, and art wants to see it as a human thing."

== Plot ==
Paradise Now follows Palestinian childhood friends Said and Khaled who live in Nablus and have been recruited for suicide attacks in Tel Aviv. It focuses on what would be their last days together.

Their handlers from an unidentified militant group tell them the attack will take place the next day. The pair record videos glorifying God and their cause, and bid their unknowing families and loved ones goodbye, while trying to behave normally to avoid arousing suspicion. The next day, they shave off their hair and beards and don suits in order to look like Israelis. Their cover story is that they are going to a wedding.

An explosive belt is attached to each man; the handlers are the only ones with the keys needed to remove the belts without detonating them. The men are instructed to detonate the bombs at the same place, a military checkpoint in Israel, with a time interval of 15 minutes so that the second bomb will kill police arriving after the first blast.

They cross the Israeli border but have to flee from guards. Khaled returns to their handlers, who fled by the time Said arrives. The handlers remove Khaled's explosive belt and issue a search for Said. Khaled believes he is the best person to find Said since he knows him well, and he is given until the end of that day to find him.

After Said escapes from the guards, he approaches an Israeli settlement. At one point, he considers detonating the bomb on a commercial bus, but he decides not to when he sees a child on board. Eventually, Said reveals his reason for taking part in the suicide bombing. While in a car with Suha (Lubna Azabal), a woman he has fallen in love with, he explains that his father was an ameel (a "collaborator", or Palestinian working for the Israelis), who was executed for his actions. He blames the Israelis for taking advantage of his father's weakness.

Khaled eventually finds Said, who is still wearing the belt and about to detonate it while lying on his father's grave. They return to the handlers, and Said convinces them that the attack need not be canceled, because he is ready for it. They both travel to Tel Aviv. Influenced by Suha, who discovered their plan, Khaled cancels his suicide attack. Khaled tries to convince Said to back off as well. However, Said manages to shake Khaled by pretending to agree.

The film ends with a long shot of Said sitting on a bus carrying Israeli soldiers, slowly zooming in on his eyes before suddenly cutting to white. The screen then fades to black.

== Cast ==
- Kais Nashef as Said
- Ali Suliman as Khaled
- Lubna Azabal as Suha
- Hiam Abbass as Said's mother
- Amer Heihel as Jamal
- Hamza Abu-Aiaash as Checkpoint Soldier
- Ashraf Bahroom as Abu-Karem
- Mohammad Bustami as Abu-Salim
- Olivier Meidinger as Abu-Shabaab
- Lutuf Nouasser as Car Onwer
- Jamel Daher as Car Onwer
- Dirar Sliman as Taxidriver Said
- Abdulrahman Daher as Mechanic
- Salwa Ibrahim as Khaled's mother

== Production ==
Hany Abu-Assad and co-writer Bero Beyer started working on the script in 1999, but it took them five years to get the story before cameras. The original script was about a man searching for his friend, who is a suicide bomber, but it evolved into a story of two friends, Said and Khaled.

The filmmakers faced great difficulties making the film on location. A land mine exploded 300 meters away from the set. While filming in Nablus, Israeli helicopter gunships launched a missile attack on a car near the film's set one day, prompting six crew members to leave the production indefinitely. Paradise Now's location manager was kidnapped by a Palestinian faction during the shooting and was not released until Palestinian president Yasser Arafat's office intervened. In an interview with the Telegraph, Hany Abu-Assad said, "If I could go back in time, I wouldn't do it again. It's not worth endangering your life for a movie."

== Statements by the filmmakers ==
In Hany Abu-Assad's Golden Globe acceptance speech he made a plea for a Palestinian state, saying he hoped the Golden Globe was “a recognition that the Palestinians deserve their liberty and equality unconditionally."

In an interview with Jewish American Tikkun magazine, Hany Abu-Assad was asked, "When you look ahead now, what gives you hope?", "The conscience of the Jewish people," he answered. "The Jews have been the conscience of humanity, always, wherever they go. Not all Jews, but part of them. Ethics. Morality. They invented it! I think Hitler wanted to kill the conscience of the Jews, the conscience of humanity. But this conscience is still alive.… Maybe a bit weak.… But still alive. Thank God." In an interview with the Tel Aviv-based newspaper Yedioth Ahronoth, Abu-Assad stated he views Palestinian suicide attacks as counter-terrorism, and that had he been raised in the Palestinian territories instead of in his Arab-Israeli home city of Nazareth, he would have become a suicide bomber himself.

Israeli-Jewish producer Amir Harel told reporters that "First and foremost the movie is a good work of art", adding that "If the movie raises awareness or presents a different side of reality, this is an important thing."

== Oscar controversy ==
Paradise Now was the first Palestinian film to be nominated for the Academy Award for Best Foreign Language Film. An earlier Palestinian film, Divine Intervention (2002), had controversially failed to gain admission to the competition, allegedly because films nominated for this award must be put forward by the government of their country, and Palestine's status as a sovereign state is disputed.

Paradise Now was submitted to the academy and to the Golden Globes as a film from 'Palestine'. It was referred to as such at the Golden Globes. However, Israeli officials, including Consul General Ehud Danoch and Consul for Media and Public Affairs Gilad Millo, tried to extract a guarantee from the Academy of Motion Picture Arts and Sciences that Paradise Now would not be presented in the ceremony as representing the state of Palestine, despite the fact it was introduced as such in the Academy Awards' official website. The Academy Awards began to refer to the film's country instead as "the Palestinian Authority". This decision angered director-writer Hany Abu-Assad, who said it represented a slap in the face for the Palestinian people and their national identity. The academy subsequently referred to it as a submission from the "Palestinian Territories".

On 1 March 2006, a group representing Israeli victims of suicide bombings asked the Oscar organizers to disqualify the film. These protesters claimed that showing the film was immoral and encouraged killing civilians in terror acts.

== Reception ==
Paradise Now
Awards and nominations
Award	Wins	Nominations
Academy Awards	0	1
Berlin International Film Festival	5	5
European Film Awards	1	2
German Film Awards	1	1
Nederlands Film Festival	0	3
Durban International Film Festival	1	1
Tallinn Black Nights Film Festival	1	1
Film Independent Spirit Awards	1	1

=== Critical response ===
Paradise Now has an 89% rating on the review compendium website Rotten Tomatoes, based on 103 reviews, and an average rating of 7.48/10. The site's consensus states: "This film delves deeply into the minds of suicide bombers, and the result is unsettling." Metacritic assigned the film a weighted average score of 71 out of 100, based on 32 critics, indicating "generally favorable reviews".

Stephen Holden, in his 28 October 2005 article in the New York Times, applauded the suspense and plot twists in the film, and the risks involved in humanizing suicide bombers, saying "it is easier to see a suicide bomber as a 21st-century Manchurian Candidate – a soulless, robotic shell of a person programmed to wreak destruction – than it is to picture a flesh-and-blood human being doing the damage." In contrast, in a 7 February 2006 article for Ynetnews entitled "Anti-Semitism Now", Irit Linor criticized the movie as a "quality Nazi film".

=== Top ten lists ===
The film appeared on three critics' top ten lists of the best films of 2005.

- 2nd
  - Kenneth Turan, Los Angeles Times
- Listed alphabetically
  - Steven Rea, The Philadelphia Inquirer
  - Carrie Rickey, The Philadelphia Inquirer

== Accolades ==
=== Academy Award ===
- On 31 January 2006, the film was nominated in the Best Foreign Language Film category.

=== Golden Globe ===
- Paradise Now won "Best Foreign Language Film" for the 63rd Golden Globe Awards, the first time a Palestinian film was nominated for such an award.

=== Other awards won ===
- 2005 Berlin International Film Festival:
  - Amnesty International Film Prize
  - AGICOA 2005 Blue Angel Award
  - Reader Jury of the "Berliner Morgenpost"
- 2005 European Film Awards:
  - Best Screenplay
- 2005 Independent Spirit Awards:
  - Best Foreign Film
- 2005 National Board of Review Awards (USA) :
  - Best Foreign Language Film
- 2005 Netherlands Film Festival:
  - Best Feature Film (Beste Lange Speelfilm)
  - Best Editing (Beste Montage)
- 2005 Durban International Film Festival (South Africa)
  - Best Director
- 2005 Dallas-Fort Worth Film Critics Association Awards
  - Best Foreign Language Film
- 2005 Vancouver Film Critics Circle Awards
  - Best Foreign Film

== See also ==
- List of Palestinian submissions for the Academy Award for Best Foreign Language Film

== Notes ==
- Greer, Darroch (1 December 2005). "Fade to Black: Hany Abu-Assad, Director". digitalcontentproducer.com (Creative Planet Network). Archived from the original on 2 December 2008.

Awards
Preceded by Simon	Golden Calf for Best long feature film 2005	Succeeded by Black Book
