= List of films about the Arab–Israeli conflict =

Below is an incomplete list of feature films, television films or television series which include events of the Arab–Israeli conflict. This list does not include documentaries, short films.

== Intercommunal conflict in Mandatory Palestine ==
Not all films about Intercommunal conflict in Mandatory Palestine are in this section, see also the section #Arab–Israeli conflict.

=== Films ===
Year	Country	Main title (Alternative title)	Original title (Original script)	Director	Subject
1933	Poland; Palestine	Sabra		Aleksander Ford	Drama. HeHalutz, Aliyah Bet
1948	Italy	The Earth Cries Out	Il grido della terra	Duilio Coletti	Drama, War. Aliyah Bet
1949	United States	Sword in the Desert		George Sherman	Action, Drama, History, War. Aliyah Bet
1949	France	Manon		Henri-Georges Clouzot	Crime, Drama. Based on the novel Manon Lescaut. Aliyah Bet
1952	Israel; United States	The Faithful City		Józef Lejtes	Drama, History, War. Aliyah Bet
1955	Israel	Every Mile a Stone	אבן על כל מיל	Aryeh Lahola	Drama. Haganah
1956	Israel	Without Home	באין מולדת	Nuri Habib	Drama. Aliyah Bet
1960	United States; Israel	Exodus		Otto Preminger	Action, Drama, War. Based on the novel Exodus. Aliyah Bet
1962	United Kingdom; United States	The Inspector		Philip Dunne	Drama, History, Romance, Thriller. Aliyah Bet
1966	United Kingdom; Israel; United States	Judith		Daniel Mann	Drama, War. Based on the novel Judith.
1980	Israel	Hide and Seek	מחבואים	Dan Wolman	Drama. Haganah
1984	Israel	Rage and Glory	זעם ותהילה	Avi Nesher	Drama, History. Lehi, Avraham Stern
1985	France; Israel	Dawn	L'Aube	Miklós Jancsó	Drama. Based on the novel Dawn. Irgun
1987	Israel	Unsettled Land	החולמים	Uri Barbash	Drama. Aliyah Bet
2001	Italy; Israel; France	Eden	עד	Amos Gitai	Drama, Romance, War. Based on the novel Homely Girl, A Life. Aliyah Bet
2002	France; Israel; Italy	Kedma		Amos Gitai	Drama, History, War. Aliyah Bet, Palmach
2007	Israel; United States	The Little Traitor		Lynn Roth	Drama. Based on the novel Panther in the Basement.
2014	Switzerland; United Kingdom; Germany; Israel	Dawn		Romed Wyder	Drama. Based on the novel Dawn. Haganah, Aliyah Bet
2023	United Kingdom; Italy	Shoshana		Michael Winterbottom	Action, Drama, History, Romance, Thriller. Shoshana Borochov, Geoffrey J. Morton, Avraham Stern, Haganah, Tower and Stockade, Shlomo Ben-Yosef, Irgun, David Raziel, Thomas James Wilkin, Benjamin Zeroni, Shlomo Schiff, Ya'akov Eliav, Moshe Sabourai
2025	State of Palestine; United Kingdom; Qatar; France; United States; Denmark; Jordan; United Arab Emirates; Saudi Arabia; Italy; Turkey; Sweden; Australia; Norway	Palestine 36	فلسطين ٣٦	Annemarie Jacir	Drama, History, War. 1936–1939 Arab revolt in Palestine

=== Television series ===
Year	Country	Main title (Alternative title)	Original title (Original script)	Director	Subject
1981	Syria	Izz ad-Din al-Qassam	عز الدين القسام	Haitham Hakki	History. Izz ad-Din al-Qassam, Black Hand (Mandatory Palestine)
1995	Syria		نهارات الدفلي	Muhammad Zaher Suleiman	
2009	France; Israel	Revivre	לחיות מחדש	Haim Bouzaglo	Drama, History. Aliyah Bet, Migration of Moroccan Jews to Israel, Cyprus internment camps
2020-2022	Israel	Rising	פלמ"ח	Omer Goldman; Yonatan Bar-Ilan; Noa Gusakov	Drama. Palmach, Aliyah Bet, Jewish Resistance Movement, Operation Agatha, Night of the Bridges, King David Hotel bombing, Acre Prison break
2021-2023	Israel	The Beauty Queen of Jerusalem	מלכת היופי של ירושלים	Oded Davidoff; Oded Lotan	Drama. Based on the novel The Beauty Queen of Jerusalem.
2022-2023	Israel	Carthago	קרתגו	Tomer Shani	Comedy, Drama, History, Thriller. Irgun and Lehi internment in Africa, Carthage Detention Camp

== 1948 Palestine war ==
Not all films about the 1948 Palestine war are in this section, see also the section #Arab–Israeli conflict.

=== Films ===
Year	Country	Main title (Alternative title)	Original title (Original script)	Director	Subject
1948	Egypt	A Girl from Palestine	فتاة من فلسطين	Mahmoud Zulfikar	
1950	Israel	Ceasefire	הפוגה	Amram Amar	Drama, War.
1953	Egypt	Land of Heroes	أرض الأبطال	Niazi Mostafa	
1955	Israel	Hill 24 Doesn't Answer	גבעה 24 אינה עונה	Thorold Dickinson	Adventure, Drama, Romance, War. Based on stories by Zvi Kolitz.
1955	Egypt	God Is on Our Side	الله معنا	Ahmed Badrakhan	Drama, History, Thriller, War. Free Officers movement, Egyptian revolution of 1952
1956	Israel	Don Quixote and Sa'ad Pancha	דן וסעדיה	Nathan Axelrod	Drama.
1959	Israel	Pillar of Fire	עמוד האש	Larry Frisch	Drama, War.
1960	Egypt	The River of Love	نهر الحب	Ezz El-Dine Zulficar	Drama, Romance. Based on the novel Anna Karenina.
1961	Egypt	The Way of Heroes	طريق الأبطال	Mahmoud Ismail	Drama, Romance, War.
1966	United States; Israel	Cast a Giant Shadow		Melville Shavelson	Adventure, Drama, History, War. Mickey Marcus, Burma Road, Battle for Jerusalem
1987	Israel	Himmo, King of Jerusalem	חימו מלך ירושלים	Amos Guttman	Drama, History, War. Based on the novel Himmo, King of Jerusalem. Battle for Jerusalem
1996	Iran; Syria	The Survivor	بازمانده	Seifollah Dad	Drama, History. Based on the novel Returning to Haifa.
2003	Israel	Islands on the Shore	איים בחוף	Yeud Levanon	Drama. Tantura massacre
2006	France; United Kingdom; Italy; Greece; Israel; United States	O Jerusalem		Élie Chouraqui	Drama, History. Based on the book O Jerusalem!. Aliyah Bet
2014	Israel	Tuviansky	טוביאנסקי	Riki Shelach Nissimoff	Drama, History, Thriller. Meir Tobianski, Binyamin Gibli, David Shaltiel
2014	Israel	Love Letters from the War		Boaz Armoni	Drama, History, War. Kfar Etzion massacre
2015	Israel; United States	A Tale of Love and Darkness	סיפור על אהבה וחושך	Natalie Portman	Biography, Drama, History, Mystery, Romance, War. Based on the memoirs of A Tale of Love and Darkness. Amos Oz
2015	Israel	Kapo in Jerusalem	קאפו בירושלים	Uri Barbash	Drama, History. Eliezer Gruenbaum, Battle of Ramat Rachel
2018	Israel	Bravery	גבורות	Yoav Arazi; Amit Ruderman	Action, Drama, History, War. Battles of the Kinarot Valley
2021	Jordan; Saudi Arabia; Sweden	Farha	فرحة	Darin J. Sallam	Drama. Nakba
2021	Israel	Image of Victory	תמונת הניצחון	Avi Nesher	Drama, History, War. Battle of Nitzanim

=== Television films ===
Year	Country	Main title (Alternative title)	Original title (Original script)	Director	Subject
1978	Israel	Khirbet Khizeh	חרבת חזעה	Ram Loevy	Drama, War. Based on the novel Khirbet Khizeh. Nakba

=== Television series ===
Year	Country	Main title (Alternative title)	Original title (Original script)	Director	Subject
2003	Israel	Battle on the Way to Jerusalem	קרב בדרך לירושלים	Isaac Zepel Yeshurun	Drama, War. Palmach

== Suez Crisis ==
Not all films about the Suez Crisis are in this section, see also the section #Arab–Israeli conflict.

=== Films ===
Year	Country	Main title (Alternative title)	Original title (Original script)	Director	Subject
1957	Egypt	Prisoner Abu Zaabal	سجين أبو زعبل	Niazi Mostafa	
1957	Egypt	Port Said	بورسعيد	Ezz El-Dine Zulficar	Drama, War.
1960	United Kingdom	The Entertainer		Tony Richardson	Drama. Based on the play The Entertainer.
1960	Egypt	Giants of the Sea	عمالقة البحار	El Sayed Bedeir	History, War.
1961	Egypt	The Sun Will Never Set	لا تطفئ الشمس	Salah Abu Seif	Drama, Romance.
1961	Egypt	Tomorrow Will Be Another Day	غدا يوم آخر	Albert Najib	
1962	United Kingdom	A Prize of Arms		Cliff Owen	Crime, Drama.
1962	Israel	Clouds Over Israel	סיניה	Ilan Eldad	Drama, War.
1963	United Kingdom	Sammy Going South (A Boy Ten Feet Tall)		Alexander Mackendrick	Adventure. Based on the novel Sammy Goes South.
1975	Syria; Lebanon	The Massacre of Kafr Kassem	كفر قاسم	Borhane Alaouié	Drama, History. Kafr Qasim massacre
1983	United Kingdom	The Ploughman's Lunch		Richard Eyre	Drama.
1984	Egypt		ليلة القبض على فاطمة	Henry Barakat	Crime, Drama.
1985	United Kingdom; United States	Plenty		Fred Schepisi	Drama. Based on the play Plenty.
1996	Egypt	Nasser 56	ناصر 56	Mohammed Fadel	Biography, Drama, History, War. Gamal Abdel Nasser

=== Television films ===
Year	Country	Main title (Alternative title)	Original title (Original script)	Director	Subject
1979	United Kingdom	Suez 1956		Michael Darlow	Drama, History, War. Anthony Eden

=== Television series ===
Year	Country	Main title (Alternative title)	Original title (Original script)	Director	Subject
1993	United Kingdom	Lipstick on Your Collar		Dennis Potter	Comedy, Drama, Musical, War.

== Six-Day War ==
Not all films about the Six-Day War are in this section, see also the section #Arab–Israeli conflict.

=== Films ===
Year	Country	Main title (Alternative title)	Original title (Original script)	Director	Subject
1967	Israel	Is Tel Aviv Burning? (60 Hours to Suez)	האם תל אביב בוערת? 60 שעות לסואץ	Kobi Jaeger	Drama, War.
1968	Italy; Israel	The Battle of Sinai (Five Days in Sinai)	חמישה ימים בסיני; La battaglia del Sinai	Maurizio Lucidi	Action, Drama, War.
1968	Israel; Denmark	Every Bastard a King	כל ממזר מלך	Uri Zohar	Drama, War.
1968	Israel; West Germany; United States	Sinai Commandos	Kommando Sinai; Schatten über Tiran; Sechs Tage Krieg המטרה טיראן	Raphael Nussbaum	Drama, Action, Adventure, War.
1968	Israel	Iris	איריס	David Greenberg	Drama, Romance.
1969	Israel	Siege	מצור	Gilberto Tofano	Drama.
1969	Italy; Israel; France	Death of a Jew	מותו של יהודי; Israël Sabra; Sabra; La mort est à la frontière	Denys de La Patellière	Drama.
1971	Egypt	Chitchat on the Nile (Adrift on the Nile)	ثرثرة فوق النيل	Hussein Kamal	Drama. Based on the novel Adrift on the Nile.
1972	Egypt; Algeria	The Sparrow	العصفور	Youssef Chahine	Drama.
1972	Egypt	A Song on the Passage	أغنية على الممر	Ali Abdel-Khalek	Drama, War. Based on the play Song on the Passageway.
1976	Egypt	The Return of the Prodigal Son	عودة الابن الضال	Youssef Chahine	Crime, Drama, Musical.
1986	Israel	Avanti Popolo	אוונטי פופולו	Rafi Bukai	Drama, War.
1991	France	For Sacha	Pour Sacha	Alexandre Arcady	Drama, Romance, War.
1992	Spain	Club Virginia Orchestra	Orquesta Club Virginia	Manuel Iborra	Comedy, Music. Santi Arisa
1996	Tunisia; France; Belgium	A Summer in La Goulette	صيف حلق الوادي; Un été à La Goulette	Férid Boughedir	Comedy, Drama.
2006	Bahrain	A Bahraini Tale	حكاية بحرينية	Bassam Al-Thawadi	Drama.
2017	Israel; United States	Azimuth	אזימוט	Mike Burstyn	Action, Drama, War.
2018	Israel	Beneath the Silence	הלומים	Erez Mizrahi; Sahar Shavit	Drama, History, War.
2023	Israel	Air War	קרב אוויר	Roy Hornshtein	Drama, War.
2023	Ukraine; Israel	Victory	המנצחים	Eliran Peled	Drama, Musical.
2026	Israel; United States	Jerusalem '67		Oded Raz	Drama, History, War. The Battle for Jerusalem in the Six-Day War

== War of Attrition ==
Not all films about the War of Attrition are in this section, see also the section #Arab–Israeli conflict.

=== Films ===
Year	Country	Main title (Alternative title)	Original title (Original script)	Director	Subject
1971	Israel	The Rooster	התרנגול	Uri Zohar	Comedy.
1978	Israel	The Band (The Troupe)	הלהקה	Avi Nesher	Comedy, Drama, Musical.
1979	Egypt; Iran	The Lion of Sinai	أسود سيناء	Fathollah Manoochehri	War.
1994	Egypt	Road to Eilat	الطريق إلى إيلات	Inaam Mohamed Ali	Drama, History, Thriller. Egyptian raids on the port of Eilat
1998	Egypt	Wall of Heroism	حائط البطولات	Mohamed Radi	History, War.
2004	Egypt	Dignity Day	يوم الكرامة	Ali Abdel-Khalek	Action, War. Sinking of the destroyer Eilat

=== Television series ===
Year	Country	Main title (Alternative title)	Original title (Original script)	Director	Subject
1996	Egypt		الحفار	Wafik Wajdi	General Intelligence Service (Egypt), Operation Digger

== Yom Kippur War ==
Not all films about the Yom Kippur War are in this section, see also the section #Arab–Israeli conflict.

=== Films ===
Year	Country	Main title (Alternative title)	Original title (Original script)	Director	Subject
1974	Israel	Day of Judgment	יום הדין	George Ovadiah	Drama.
1974	Egypt	Great Fulfillment	الوفاء العظيم	Helmy Rafla	Drama.
1974	Egypt	Bedur	بدور	Nader Galal	Drama.
1975	Israel	Three and One	שלושה ואחת	Mikhail Kalik	Drama. Based on the story Mallow.
1975	Egypt	Until the end of life	حتى آخر العمر	Ashraf Fahmy	Drama. Operation Badr
1975	Syria	Opposite Direction	الاتجاه المعاكس	Marwan Haddad	
1981	Israel	The Vulture	העיט	Yaky Yosha	Drama. Based on the novel The Last Jew.
1982	Iraq; Egypt	Motaw'ie and Bahiya	مطاوع وبهية	Saheb Haddad	Drama.
1984	United States; Israel	The Last Winter	החורף האחרון	Riki Shelach Nissimoff	Drama, War.
1984	Israel	Atalia	עתליה	Akiva Tevet	Drama, Romance. Based on the story Atalia.
1986	Israel	The Lover	המאהב	Michal Bat-Adam	Drama. Based on the novel The Lover.
1988	Israel	Shell Shock	בצילו של הלם קרב	Yoel Sharon	Drama.
1989	Egypt	Execution Squad	كتيبة الإعدام	Atef El Tayeb	Drama, Mystery, Thriller. Battle of Suez
1991	Egypt	War in the Land of Egypt	المواطن مصرى	Salah Abu Seif	Drama. Based on the novel War in the Land of Egypt.
1991	Israel	The War After	זמן אמת	Uri Barbash	Drama. Based on the novel The Great Awakening.
1995	Israel	There Was No War in 72	ב-72 לא הייתה מלחמה	David Kreiner	Drama, War.
1999	Israel	Vulcan Junction	צומת וולקן	Eran Riklis	Drama, Music.
2000	Israel; France	Kippur	כיפור	Amos Gitai	Drama, War. Amos Gitai, Unit 669, Walnut Patrol
2002	United States; Germany; Canada	The Sum of All Fears		Phil Alden Robinson	Action, Drama, Thriller, War. Based on the novel The Sum of All Fears.
2002	Egypt	Prince of Darkness	أمير الظلام	Ramy Imam	Action, Comedy, Romance.
2003	Israel	InSight	תיאום כוונות	Eyal Halfon	Drama, War. Based on the book Adjusting Sights.
2006	Israel	Touch Wood	טאץ' ווד	Samuel Calderon	Based on the play Touch Wood.
2016	Egypt		أسد سيناء	Hassan Al Sayed	Drama, War. Sayyid Zakariya Khalil
2023	United Kingdom; United States	Golda		Guy Nattiv	Biography, Drama, History, War. Golda Meir
2023	Israel	The Stronghold	המזח	Lior Chefetz	Drama, War. The pier is located

=== Television films ===
Year	Country	Main title (Alternative title)	Original title (Original script)	Director	Subject
1978	Israel	Overlap	חפיף	Ian McNaughton	
2003	Israel	Silence of the Sirens	שתיקת הצופרים	Ori Inbar	Drama. Based on the book The viewer who fell asleep. Research Department (Aman), Agranat Commission

=== Television series ===
Year	Country	Main title (Alternative title)	Original title (Original script)	Director	Subject
1983	United States	Sadat		Richard Michaels	Biography, Drama, History, War. Anwar Sadat
2020	Israel	Valley of Tears	עֵמֶק הַבָּכָא	Yaron Zilberman	Drama, War. Valley of Tears
2025	Israel	The Stronghold	המזח	Lior Chefetz	Drama, War. The pier is located

== 1982 Lebanon War ==
Not all films about the 1982 Lebanon War are in this section, see also the section #Arab–Israeli conflict.

=== Films ===
Year	Country	Main title (Alternative title)	Original title (Original script)	Director	Subject
1986	Israel	Ricochets	שתי אצבעות מצידון	Eli Cohen	Drama, War.
1987	Israel; United States; West Germany	Deadline		Nathaniel Gutman	Action, Drama, Mystery, War. Sabra and Shatila massacre
1989	Israel	Burning Memory	רסיסים	Yossi Somer	Drama.
1991	Israel	Cup Final	גמר גביע	Eran Riklis	Drama, War. 1982 FIFA World Cup
1991	Israel	Time for Cherries	עונת הדובדבנים	Haim Bouzaglo	Drama, War.
2004	Israel	Summer Story	סיפור קיץ	Shmuel Haimovich	Drama.
2004	Israel	Delayed Reaction	תגובה מאוחרת	Samuel Calderon	Drama.
2009	Israel; France; Germany; United Kingdom	Lebanon	לבנון	Samuel Maoz	Drama, War.
2012	Canada	The Valley of Tears	La Vallée des larmes	Maryanne Zéhil	Drama. Sabra and Shatila massacre
2012	United Kingdom; Israel; France	Zaytoun	זייתון زيتون	Eran Riklis	Adventure, Drama, Thriller, War.
2019	Lebanon; Norway; France; Qatar	1982		Oualid Mouaness	Drama, History, Romance, War.
2024	France; Luxembourg; Belgium	The Fourth Wall	Le Quatrième Mur	David Oelhoffen	Drama, History, War. Based on the novel Le Quatrième Mur. Antigone, Sabra and Shatila massacre

== South Lebanon conflict (1985–2000) ==
Not all films about the South Lebanon conflict (1985–2000) are in this section, see also the section #Arab–Israeli conflict.

=== Films ===
Year	Country	Main title (Alternative title)	Original title (Original script)	Director	Subject
2002	Israel	Yossi & Jagger	יוסי וג'אגר	Eytan Fox	Drama, History, Romance, War.
2003	Lebanon; France	The Kite	طيّارة من ورق; Le Cerf-volant	Randa Chahal Sabag	Drama.
2007	Israel	Beaufort	בופור	Joseph Cedar	Action, Drama, War. Based on the novel Beaufort. Beaufort Castle
2015	Iran; Lebanon	The Buried Secret	السر المدفون	Ali Ghaffari	Action, War.
2016	Israel	The Last Band in Lebanon	הלהקה האחרונה בלבנון	Ben Bachar; Itzik Kricheli	Comedy.
2026	United States	Monument		Bryan Singer	Drama. Amnon Rechter, Yaakov Rechter

=== Television films ===
Year	Country	Main title (Alternative title)	Original title (Original script)	Director	Subject
2003	Israel	Valley of Dreams	עמק החלומות	Omri Givon	Drama, War.

=== Television series ===
Year	Country	Main title (Alternative title)	Original title (Original script)	Director	Subject
2010-2012	Israel	Prisoners of War	חטופים	Gideon Raff	Drama, Mystery, Thriller.

== First Intifada ==
Not all films about the First Intifada are in this section, see also the section #Arab–Israeli conflict.

=== Films ===
Year	Country	Main title (Alternative title)	Original title (Original script)	Director	Subject
1989	Israel	Greenfields	שדות ירוקים	Isaac Zepel Yeshurun	Drama.
1993	Israel; France; State of Palestine; Germany; Netherlands	Curfew	حتى إشعار آخر	Rashid Masharawi	Drama.
1993	Israel	Life According to Agfa	החיים על פי אגפא	Assi Dayan	Drama.
1995	Belgium; Spain; State of Palestine; United Kingdom	The Tale of the Three Lost Jewels	حكاية الجواهر الثلاثة; Le Conte des trois diamants	Michel Khleifi	Drama, Romance, War.
2012	Israel; France	Rock the Casbah	רוק בקסבה	Yariv Horowitz	Action, Drama, History, War.

== Second Intifada ==
Not all films about the Second Intifada are in this section, see also the section #Arab–Israeli conflict.

=== Films ===
Year	Country	Main title (Alternative title)	Original title (Original script)	Director	Subject
2001	Egypt	Friends or Business	أصحاب ولا بيزنس	Ali Idris	Action, Comedy, Drama, Romance. Based on the movie I Love Trouble.
2004	Israel; Sweden	Walk on Water	ללכת על המים	Eytan Fox	Drama, Mystery, Thriller.
2005	Israel; Netherlands; State of Palestine; Germany; France	Paradise Now	الجنّة الآن	Hany Abu-Assad	Crime, Drama, Thriller, War. Palestinian suicide attacks
2005	France; Israel	Distortion	דיסטורשן	Haim Bouzaglo	Drama.
2006	Israel	The Bubble	הבועה	Eytan Fox	Comedy, Drama, Romance.
2011	Israel	Testimony	עדות شهادة	Shlomi Elkabetz	Drama.
2012	Israel	Present Continuous	החיים בינתיים	Aner Preminger	Drama, War.
2013	State of Palestine; Italy; Germany; France	Giraffada (Girafada)		Rani Massalha	Drama. Qalqilya Zoo
2014	State of Palestine; France; Algeria	Eyes of a Thief	عيون الحرامية	Najwa Najjar	Drama. 2002 Wadi al-Haramiya sniper attack
2024	Italy; United States; Belgium	How Kids Roll	I bambini di Gaza – Sulle onde della libertà	Loris Lai	Drama. Based on the novel Sulle onde della libertà.

=== Television films ===
Year	Country	Main title (Alternative title)	Original title (Original script)	Director	Subject
2002	Italy		Il bambino di Betlemme	Umberto Marino	Drama, Romance. Siege of the Church of the Nativity, Operation Defensive Shield
2008	United Kingdom	The Shooting of Thomas Hurndall		Rowan Joffé	Biography, Drama, History. Tom Hurndall

=== Television series ===
Year	Country	Main title (Alternative title)	Original title (Original script)	Director	Subject
2005-2007	Israel	Reserve Duty	מילואים	Uri Barbash	Drama.
2023	Israel	Red Skies	שמים אדומים	Alon Zingman	Drama, Thriller. Based on the novel Red Sky. Operation Defensive Shield

== 2006 Lebanon War ==
Not all films about the 2006 Lebanon War are in this section, see also the section #Arab–Israeli conflict.

=== Films ===
Year	Country	Main title (Alternative title)	Original title (Original script)	Director	Subject
2007	Israel; France	Strangers	זרים	Guy Nattiv; Erez Tadmor	Drama, Romance. Based on the short film Strangers. 2006 FIFA World Cup
2007	France; Lebanon; United Kingdom	Under the Bombs	Sous les bombes تحت القصف	Philippe Aractingi	Drama, Romance, War.
2008	France; Lebanon	I Want to See	Je veux voir	Joana Hadjithomas and Khalil Joreige	Drama.
2008	Israel	Lost in the Jungle	ממעמקי הג'ונגל	Yehuda Grovais	Drama.
2008	Israel	Next Door	דלת מול דלת	Haim Bouzaglo	Drama.
2008	Israel	The Other War		Tamar Glezerman	Drama.
2010	Israel	The Matchmaker	פעם הייתי	Avi Nesher	Drama. Based on the novel Heroes Fly to Her.
2011	Israel; France	Off White Lies	אורחים לרגע	Maya Kenig	Drama.
2013	Israel	Haven	עיר מקלט	Amikam Kovner	Drama.
2018	Israel	The Dive	הצלילה	Yona Rozenkier	Drama, War.

=== Television films ===
Year	Country	Main title (Alternative title)	Original title (Original script)	Director	Subject
2008	Israel	Secure Space	מרחב מוגן	Oren Gvili	Drama, Romance, War.

=== Television series ===
Year	Country	Main title (Alternative title)	Original title (Original script)	Director	Subject
2018	Israel	When Heroes Fly	בשבילה גיבורים עפים	Omri Givon	Action, Drama. Based on the novel Heroes Fly to Her.

== Gaza war ==
=== Films ===
Year	Country	Main title (Alternative title)	Original title (Original script)	Director	Subject
2024	Israel	Red Flower	פרח אדום	Haim Bouzaglo	Drama. October 7 attacks, Battle of Sderot
2024	Israel; Italy	Of Dogs and Men	על כלבים ואנשים	Dani Rosenberg	Drama. Nir Oz attack, October 7 attacks
2024	Israel	Jewish Revenge 6: Gaza in Focus	נקמה יהודית 6	Yehuda Grovais	Action, Drama, War. October 7 attacks, Israeli airstrike on the Iranian consulate in Damascus, April 2024 Iranian strikes on Israel, Israeli hostage deal protests, Battle of Beit Hanoun, Tunnel warfare in the Gaza Strip, Observational warnings
2025	Israel; United States	Stay Forte	תהיה חזק	Doron Eran	Drama, War. Killing of Alon Shamriz, Yotam Haim, and Samer Talalka, Gaza war hostage crisis, October 7 attacks
2025	Tunisia; France; State of Palestine; United Kingdom; Saudi Arabia; United States; Italy; Cyprus	The Voice of Hind Rajab	صوت هند رجب	Kaouther Ben Hania	Biography, Drama, War. Killing of Hind Rajab, Palestine Red Crescent Society
2025	France; Israel; Cyprus; Germany	Yes	כן!	Nadav Lapid	Comedy, Drama. October 7 attacks
2025	United States; Israel	12 Hours in October	12 שעות באוקטובר	Danny Abeckaser	Drama. October 7 attacks
2026	Israel; United States	Our Loves	האהבות שלנו	Avi Nesher	Drama, War. October 7 attacks
2026	State of Palestine; Qatar	Thirteen in Gaza	غزة 13	Hosam Abu Dan	Drama, War.
202X	Israel	Tankistas: Wild Company	הטנקיסטיות: פלוגת פרא	Ayelet Menahemi	War. 2023 Israeli female tank crew fight

=== Television series ===
Year	Country	Main title (Alternative title)	Original title (Original script)	Director	Subject
2024	Israel		שישה באוקטובר	Or Mazza	October 7 attacks
2024	Israel	Remnants		Roman Shumunov	Drama. October 7 attacks
2024-2025	Israel	One Day in October	שחר אדום	Oded Davidoff	Drama. October 7 attacks
2025	Israel; United States	Red Alert	אור ראשון	Lior Chefetz	Drama, History. October 7 attacks

== Arab–Israeli conflict ==
This section contains films that do not specify a specific war or films that tell the story of more than one war.

=== Films ===
Year	Country	Main title (Alternative title)	Original title (Original script)	Director	Subject
1962	Egypt	Struggle of Giants	صراع الجبابرة	Zoheir Bakir; Raymond Nassour	Drama, History, Thriller, War.
1966	Egypt	My Beloved	من أحب	Magda el-Sabahi	Drama, Romance. Based on the novel Gone with the Wind. 1948 Palestine war, Egyptian revolution of 1952, Suez Crisis
1967	Israel	Scouting Patrol	סיירים	Micha Shagrir	Drama, War.
1969	United States	The Harem Bunch		Paul Hunt	Adventure, Comedy.
1970	Israel	Attack at Dawn	הפריצה הגדולה	Menahem Golan	Drama, War.
1971	Israel	Fishke Goes to War	פישקה במילואים	George Ovadiah	Comedy, Drama.
1973	Israel	The House on Chelouche Street	הבית ברחוב שלוש	Moshé Mizrahi	Drama. Moshé Mizrahi, Lehi, Irgun, Intercommunal conflict in Mandatory Palestine, 1948 Palestine war
1974	Egypt	The Bullet is Still in My Pocket	الرصاصة لا تزال في جيبي	Houssam El-Din Mustafa	Drama, Romance, War. Six-Day War, War of Attrition, Yom Kippur War
1974	Egypt	Sons of Quiet	أبناء الصمت	Mohamed Radi	War. Sinking of the destroyer Eilat, War of Attrition, Bar Lev Line, Operation Badr, Yom Kippur War
1975	Egypt	Karnak	الكرنك	Ali Badrakhan	Drama. Based on the novel Karnak Café.
1976	Israel	Halfon Hill Doesn't Answer	גבעת חלפון אינה עונה	Assi Dayan	Comedy.
1977	Italy	Charleston		Marcello Fondato	Comedy, Crime.
1978	Egypt	Life Is a Second	العمر لحظة	Mohamed Radi	Drama, War. War of Attrition, Yom Kippur War
1979	Egypt	We Are the Bus People	إحنا بتوع الأتوبيس	Hussein Kamal	Drama, History, Thriller. Based on the book Dialogue Behind Bars.
1982	Israel	Repeat Dive	צלילה חוזרת	Shimon Dotan	Drama.
1982	Egypt		وضاع حبي هناك	Ali Abdel-Khalek	Remake of the movie Sunflower. Six-Day War, Yom Kippur War
1984	Lebanon; United Kingdom; Belgium; Netherlands	Leila and the Wolves	ليلى والذئاب	Heiny Srour	Drama, History, War. 1936–1939 Arab revolt in Palestine, Intercommunal conflict in Mandatory Palestine, Deir Yassin massacre, 1948 Palestine war, Lebanese Civil War
1989	Israel	The Valley Train	רכבת העמק	Jonathan Paz	Drama. Jonathan Paz, 1948 Palestine war, Qibya massacre, Palestinian Fedayeen insurgency, Six-Day War
1989	Israel	Crossfire	אש צולבת	Gideon Ganani	Drama, Romance, War. Chaya Seidenberg, Lehi, Intercommunal conflict in Mandatory Palestine, 1948 Palestine war
1990	Israel; United States	Torn Apart		Jack Fisher	Drama, Romance, War. Based on the novel A Forbidden Love. Six-Day War, Yom Kippur War
1992	Syria	The Night	الليل	Mohammad Malas	Drama, History, War. The Sixty-Day Strike, 1948 Palestine war, Six-Day War
1993	Germany; Egypt	Little Dreams	أحلام صغيرة	Khaled El Hagar	Drama, History. Suez Crisis, Six-Day War, War of Attrition
1999	Egypt		فتاة من إسرائيل	Ihab Radhi	Drama, Romance, War.
2001	Egypt	The Days of Sadat	أيام السادات	Mohamed Khan	Biography, Drama, History. Anwar Sadat, Free Officers movement, Egyptian revolution of 1952, Iron Guard of Egypt, Suez Crisis, Six-Day War, Corrective revolution, Yom Kippur War
2004	Israel; France; Germany	The Syrian Bride	הכלה הסורית	Eran Riklis	Comedy, Drama.
2004	France; Egypt; Morocco; Denmark; Belgium	The Gate of Sun	باب الشمس; La Porte du soleil	Yousry Nasrallah	Romance, Drama, War. Based on the novel The Gate of Sun.
2005	Egypt	The Embassy in the Building	السفارة في العمارة	Amr Arafa	Comedy, Drama.
2008	Morocco	Goodbye Mothers	وداعا أمهات; Adieu Mères	Mohamed Ismaïl	Drama. Pisces Affair, Migration of Moroccan Jews to Israel
2009	Egypt; Italy	The Traveller	المسافر	Ahmad Maher	Drama. Nakba, Yom Kippur War
2010	France; Israel; Italy; India; United States	Miral		Julian Schnabel	Drama, History. Based on the novel Miral. Hind al-Husseini, Deir Yassin massacre, 1948 Arab–Israeli War, First Intifada
2011	Turkey	Valley of the Wolves: Palestine	Kurtlar Vadisi: Filistin	Zübeyr Şaşmaz	Action, Drama, War. 2010 Gaza flotilla raid
2012	France; Israel	Inheritance	Héritage	Hiam Abbass	Drama. Israeli–Lebanese conflict
2013	Israel	A Place in Heaven	מקום בגן עדן	Yossi Madmoni	Drama. Yom Kippur War
2013	Israel	Farewell Baghdad	מפריח היונים مطير الحمام	Nissim Dayan	Drama. Based on the novel The pigeons bloom. Operation Ezra and Nehemiah
2014	South Africa	Bordering on Bad Behavior		Jac Mulder	Action, Comedy, Drama, War. Israeli–Lebanese conflict
2014	Israel; France	Operation Sunflower	מבצע חמניה	Avraham Kushnir	Drama, History. Shimon Peres Negev Nuclear Research Center
2015	Israel; New Zealand; Germany	Atomic Falafel	פלאפל אטומי	Dror Shaul	Comedy, Drama.
2016	Indonesia	I Leave My Heart in Lebanon		Benni Setiawan; T. B. Silalahi	Action, Drama, War. United Nations Interim Force in Lebanon
2019	Canada; United States	The Red Sea Diving Resort		Gideon Raff	Drama, History, Thriller. Ferede Aklum, Operation Moses, Operation Joshua
2019	United States	Golda's Balcony		Scott Schwartz	Biography. Based on the play Golda's Balcony. Golda Meir
2019	Egypt	The Passage	الممر	Sherif Arafa	Action, Biography, Drama, War. Operation Focus, Six-Day War, War of Attrition
2019	Israel; United States	Jarhead: Law of Return		Don Michael Paul	Action, Drama, War.
2022	Cyprus; France; Germany	Tel Aviv/Beirut	Tel Aviv - Beyrouth	Michale Boganim	Drama. 1982 Lebanon War, 2000 Israeli withdrawal and collapse of South Lebanon Army, 2006 Lebanon War
2025	Germany; Cyprus; State of Palestine; Jordan; Greece; Qatar; Saudi Arabia; United States; Egypt	All That's Left of You	اللي باقي منك	Cherien Dabis	Drama, Romance. 1948 Palestine war, Nakba, First Intifada
2025	Egypt; Austria; Sweden; United Kingdom	The Stories	القِصَص	Abu Bakr Shawky	Drama. Six-Day War, Yom Kippur War
2025	Israel	Oxygen		Netalie Braun	Drama. Hezbollah–Israel conflict (2023–present)

=== Science fiction, fantasy and horror films ===
Year	Country	Main title (Alternative title)	Original title (Original script)	Director	Subject
1975	Italy	Mondo candido		Gualtiero Jacopetti; Franco E. Prosperi	Adventure, Comedy, Fantasy. Based on a novel Candide.
2013	Israel	Cannon Fodder	בשר תותחים	Eitan Gafny	Action, Horror. Israeli–Lebanese conflict

=== Television films ===
Year	Country	Main title (Alternative title)	Original title (Original script)	Director	Subject
1973	United States	The Going Up of David Lev		James F. Collier	Drama, Family.
1992	Egypt		حكايات الغريب	Inaam Mohamed Ali	Drama, War. Six-Day War, Yom Kippur War
1994	United Kingdom; United States	Doomsday Gun		Robert Young	Action, Drama, History, Thriller. Supergun affair, Gerald Bull, Project Babylon
2004	Israel	Real Time	בזמן אמת	Ori Inbar	Action, Drama.

=== Television series ===
Year	Country	Main title (Alternative title)	Original title (Original script)	Director	Subject
1989	United Kingdom; Yugoslavia; United States	Twist of Fate		Ian Sharp	Drama. Based on the novel Pursuit. Intercommunal conflict in Mandatory Palestine, spies
1998-2001	Israel	Basic Training	טירונות	Uri Barbash	Drama.
1999	Israel	Egoz	אגוז	Eli Cohen	Drama. Pisces Affair, Migration of Moroccan Jews to Israel
2004	Syria	The Palestinian Alienation	التغريبة الفلسطينية	Hatem Ali	Drama, History, War. 1936–1939 Arab revolt in Palestine, Intercommunal conflict in Mandatory Palestine, 1948 Palestine war, Six-Day War, Nakba
2010	Syria	I am Jerusalem	أنا القدس	Basil Al-Khatib	Drama, History. Jerusalem, Intercommunal conflict in Mandatory Palestine, 1948 Palestine war, Six-Day War, Nakba
2011	United Kingdom	The Promise		Peter Kosminsky	Drama, Mystery, War. Aliyah Bet, Intercommunal conflict in Mandatory Palestine, King David Hotel bombing, The Sergeants affair, Tilhas Tizi Gesheften, Battle of Haifa (1948), 1948 Palestine war, Nakba, Second Intifada
2016/20	Israel	Charlie Golf One	תאג"ד	Zion Rubin	Drama. Israel and the Syrian civil war
2020	Kuwait	Um Harun	ام هارون	Mohamed Gamal El-Adl	Drama. Nakba
2023	Israel; United States	Ghosts of Beirut		Greg Barker	History, Thriller. Imad Mughniyeh, 1982 Lebanon War, 1983 US embassy bombing in Beirut, 1983 Beirut barracks bombings, William Francis Buckley, Lebanon hostage crisis, Karbala provincial headquarters raid, Assassination of Imad Mughniyeh
2024	Israel	Northern Wind	רוח צפונית	Assaf Bernstein	Drama. Unit 8200
2025	Israel		תחריר	Ariel Benbaji	Action, Drama, Thriller. 2011 attack on the Israeli Embassy in Egypt

== Israeli–Palestinian conflict ==
=== Films ===
Year	Country	Main title (Alternative title)	Original title (Original script)	Director	Subject
1957	Egypt	Land of Peace	أرض السلام	Kamal El Sheikh	Drama, History, Romance, War.
1969	Pakistan	Zarqa	زرقا	Riaz Shahid	Drama. Neelo
1972	Israel; United States	The Jerusalem File		John Flynn	Action, Drama, Thriller.
1972	Syria	The Knife	السكين	Khaled Hadadi	Drama. Based on the novel What remains for you.
1972	Israel	Azit the Paratrooper Dog	עזית הכלבה הצנחנית	Boaz Davidson	Action, Drama. Based on the novel Azit the Paratrooper Dog.
1975	United Kingdom; Italy; Israel	Children of Rage		Arthur Allan Seidelman	Drama.
1977	United States; Mexico	Sorcerer		William Friedkin	Adventure, Drama, Thriller. Based on the novel The Wages of Fear.
1977	Syria	Heroes Are Born Twice	الأبطال يولدون مرتين	Salah Dehny	
1979	Israel; West Germany	Worlds Apart	אל תשאלי אם אני אוהב	Barbara Noble	Drama. Based on the novel Don't ask if I like it.
1982	Israel	Eastern Wind	חמסין	Daniel Wachsmann	Drama.
1983	France; Israel	Hanna K.		Costa-Gavras	Drama.
1984	Israel	Beyond the Walls	מאחורי הסורגים	Uri Barbash	Drama.
1984	United States	The Ambassador		J. Lee Thompson	Action, Drama, Thriller, War.
1985	Israel	On a Narrow Bridge	גשר צר מאד	Nissim Dayan	Drama, Romance.
1986	Israel	The Smile of the Lamb	חיוך הגדי	Shimon Dotan	Drama. Based on the novel The Smile of the Lamb.
1987	Belgium; France; West Germany; State of Palestine	Wedding in Galilee	عرس الجليل; Noce en Galilée	Michel Khleifi	Drama.
1989	Israel	One of Us	אחד משלנו	Uri Barbash	Drama.
1989	West Germany; Israel; United Kingdom	Streets of Yesterday	רחובות האתמול	Judd Ne'eman	Drama.
1991	Israel; Belgium; France; United Kingdom; State of Palestine	Canticle of the Stones	نشيد الحجر	Michel Khleifi	Drama.
1992	Israel; United States	Double Edge	להב חצוי	Amos Kollek	Drama, Thriller.
1992	Egypt		ناجي العلي	Atef El Tayeb	Biography, Drama, History. Naji al-Ali
1994	France; Tunisia	Swallows Never Die in Jerusalem	Les hirondelles ne meurent pas à Jérusalem	Ridha Behi	Drama.
1996	State of Palestine; Germany; Netherlands	Haifa	حيفا; Haïfa	Rashid Masharawi	Drama, War.
1998	Israel	Circus Palestine	קרקס פלשתינה	Eyal Halfon	Drama.
1999	Israel	Last Resort	הגרעין הקשה	Aner Preminger	Drama.
2000	Israel	Time of Favor	ההסדר	Joseph Cedar	Drama.
2000	Israel		דג מלוח	Moti Gal; Yehousha Ben-Porat; Paulina Levinstein	
2001	United Kingdom; France; Egypt; Japan; Mexico; United States; Iran	11′09″01 September 11		Youssef Chahine; Amos Gitai; Shōhei Imamura; Alejandro González Iñárritu; Claude Lelouch; Samira Makhmalbaf; Mira Nair; Idrissa Ouédraogo; Sean Penn; Danis Tanović; Ken Loach	Drama.
2002	France; Morocco; Germany; State of Palestine	Divine Intervention	يد إلهية	Elia Suleiman	Drama, Romance, War, Comedy.
2002	State of Palestine; Netherlands; United Arab Emirates	Rana's Wedding (Jerusalem, Another Day)	القدس في يوم آخر	Hany Abu-Assad	Drama, Comedy.
2002	Egypt	Volcano of Rage	بركان الغضب	Mazen Al Gably	Drama.
2002	Netherlands; State of Palestine; France; Australia		Ticket to Jerusalem	Rashid Masharawi	Drama.
2004	Italy	Private		Saverio Costanzo	Drama, War.
2004	France; Switzerland	Our Music	Notre musique	Jean-Luc Godard	Drama.
2004	Israel; France	Promised Land	הארץ המובטחת	Amos Gitai	Drama, Thriller.
2005	Israel	Close to Home	קרוב לבית	Vidi Bilu; Dalia Hager	Drama. Israel Border Police
2005	Israel; Belgium; France; Spain	Free Zone		Amos Gitai	Comedy, Drama.
2005	State of Palestine; France	Waiting	انتظار; Attente	Rashid Masharawi	Drama.
2006	Israel; United States	Forgiveness		Udi Aloni	Drama.
2006	Israel	Different Sky	בשמים אחרים	Ariel Talpalar	Drama, Romance.
2007	Israel; Germany; France; Italy	Disengagement	Désengagement	Amos Gitai	Drama. Israeli disengagement from the Gaza Strip
2007	Israel	Wild Dogs	רק כלבים רצים חופשי	Arnon Zadok	Drama.
2008	United States; Israel; Mexico	You Don't Mess with the Zohan		Dennis Dugan	Action, Comedy.
2008	State of Palestine; Switzerland; Belgium; United States; United Kingdom; Spain; France	Salt of this Sea	ملح هذا البحر	Annemarie Jacir	Drama, Romance.
2008	Israel; Germany; France	Lemon Tree	עץ לימון شجرة ليمون	Eran Riklis	Drama, War. Shaul Mofaz
2008	United States	David & Fatima		Alain Zaloum	Drama, Romance, War. Based on the play Romeo and Juliet.
2008	State of Palestine; Tunisia; Netherlands	Laila's Birthday	عيد ميلاد ليلى	Rashid Masharawi	Drama.
2008	Israel; Germany; France; Canada; Belgium	Restless	חסר מנוחה	Amos Kollek	Drama.
2008	Israel	Seven Minutes in Heaven	שבע דקות בגן עדן	Omri Givon	Drama.
2008	United States	Language of the Enemy		Mitch Davis	Drama.
2009	Israel; Germany; France	Jaffa	כלת הים يافا	Keren Yedaya	Drama.
2009	France; Belgium; Italy; United Arab Emirates	The Time That Remains		Elia Suleiman	Drama, History.
2009	United States; United Arab Emirates; Canada; Kuwait; Jordan	Amreeka		Cherien Dabis	Drama.
2009	Israel; Germany; United Kingdom	Ajami	عجمي עג'מי	Scandar Copti; Yaron Shani	Crime, Drama.
2011	France; Israel; Canada	A Bottle in the Gaza Sea	Une bouteille à la mer	Thierry Binisti	Drama. Based on the novel Une bouteille dans la mer de Gaza.
2011	France; Germany; Belgium	When Pigs Have Wings	Le Cochon de Gaza	Sylvain Estibal	Comedy.
2011	Israel; United Kingdom	Lipstikka	אודם	Jonathan Sagall	Drama, Thriller.
2011	Israel	All the Time in the World	כל הזמן שבעולם وقت العالم كله	Rani Magar	Drama.
2012	Canada; France	Inch'Allah		Anaïs Barbeau-Lavalette	Drama.
2012	Israel; United States; Germany	Out in the Dark	עלטה	Michael Mayer	Crime, Drama, Romance, Thriller.
2012	France	The Other Son	Le Fils de l'Autre	Lorraine Lévy	Drama.
2012	Lebanon; France; Qatar; Belgium; Egypt	The Attack		Ziad Doueiri	Crime, Drama, Mystery, War. Based on the novel L'Attentat.
2012	Israel	The Glow of Heavens	זוהר הרקיע	Eliyahu Binyamin	Drama. Israeli disengagement from the Gaza Strip
2012	Israel	Room 514	חדר 514	Sharon Bar-Ziv	Drama.
2013	State of Palestine	Omar	عمر	Hany Abu-Assad	Crime, Drama, Romance, Thriller, War.
2013	Israel; Germany; Belgium	Bethlehem	בית לחם	Yuval Adler	Drama, Thriller, War.
2013	France; Israel	Kidon	כידון	Emmanuel Naccache	Action, Comedy. Assassination of Mahmoud Al-Mabhouh
2013	Israel	Ana Arabia		Amos Gitai	Drama.
2013	Israel; France; Germany	Paradise Cruise	פרדייס קרוז	Matan Guggenheim	Drama, Thriller.
2014	Israel	Road 40 South	כביש 40 דרום	Eldad Bouganim	Drama, War.
2015	United Kingdom; Israel	A.K.A Nadia	נדיה - שם זמני	Tova Ascher	Drama.
2015	State of Palestine; France; Jordan; Lebanon; Qatar; United Arab Emirates	3000 Nights	3000 ليلة	Mai Masri	Drama.
2015	Israel	Wounded Land	ארץ פצועה	Erez Tadmor	Drama.
2016	Israel; Germany; Belgium	Beyond the Mountains and Hills	מעבר להרים ולגבעות	Eran Kolirin	Drama.
2016	Israel	The Road to Where	הדרך לאן	Michal Bat-Adam	Drama. Nakba
2017	Israel; Germany; France; Switzerland	Foxtrot	פוֹקְסטְרוֹט	Samuel Maoz	Drama, War.
2017	Israel	The Cousin	הבן-דוד	Tzahi Grad	Comedy, Drama.
2017	Israel	Between Worlds	בין העולמות	Miya Hatav	Drama.
2018	United States	Beirut		Brad Anderson	Action, Adventure, Crime, Drama, Mystery, Thriller. Lebanon hostage crisis
2018	State of Palestine; Germany; Netherlands; Mexico	The Reports on Sarah and Saleem	التقارير حول سارة وسليم	Muayad Alayan	Crime, Drama, Mystery, Romance, War.
2018	Israel; Luxembourg; France; Belgium	Tel Aviv on Fire	תל אביב על האש	Sameh Zoabi	Comedy, Drama, Romance.
2018	State of Palestine; United States; Qatar	Screwdriver	مفك	Bassam Jarbawi	Drama.
2019	Israel	The Dead of Jaffa	המתים של יפו	Ram Loevy	Drama.
2019	United States; Brazil	Abe		Fernando Grostein Andrade	Comedy, Drama.
2019	Germany	Crescendo		Dror Zahavi	Drama, Music. Daniel Barenboim, West–Eastern Divan Orchestra
2020	State of Palestine; Italy; Turkey; Sweden; Jordan	200 Meters	200 متر	Ameen Nayfeh	Adventure, Drama.
2020	Israel; France	Laila in Haifa	לילה בחיפה	Amos Gitai	Comedy, Drama.
2020	State of Palestine; France; Germany; Portugal; Qatar; Israel	Gaza mon amour	غزة مونامور	Tarzan and Arab Nasser	Comedy, Drama.
2021	Israel; France	Let It Be Morning	ויהי בוקר فليكن صباحا	Eran Kolirin	Drama. Based on the novel Let It Be Morning.
2021	Egypt; Jordan; United Arab Emirates	Amira	أميرة	Mohamed Diab	Drama.
2022	France; Saudi Arabia; Tunisia; Qatar; State of Palestine	Alam	علم	Firas Khoury	Drama.
2022	Israel	My Dearest Enemy	אויבת יקרה שלי	Tzipi Trope	Drama.
2023	United Kingdom; Qatar; State of Palestine	The Teacher	الأستاذ	Farah Nabulsi	Drama, Thriller, War.
2023	Israel	Kissufim	כיסופים	Keren Nechmad	Drama.
2023	Israel	The Vanishing Soldier	החייל הנעלם	Dani Rosenberg	Drama, Thriller, War.
2024	State of Palestine; Germany; France; Italy; Qatar	Happy Holidays	ينعاد عليكو	Scandar Copti	Drama.
2025	Israel	The Sea	הים البحر	Shai Carmeli-Pollak	Drama.
2026	Iran	Land of Angels	سرزمین فرشته ها	Babak Khajehpasha	

=== Television films ===
Year	Country	Main title (Alternative title)	Original title (Original script)	Director	Subject
1988	United Kingdom	A Dinner of Herbs		Michael Darlow	Drama.
2021	United States	Oslo		Bartlett Sher	Drama, History, Thriller. Based on the play Oslo. Oslo Accords

=== Television series ===
Year	Country	Main title (Alternative title)	Original title (Original script)	Director	Subject
2005	Israel	War Room	חדר מלחמה	Ronny Kay-Shefer	Drama.
2007-2013	Israel	Arab Labor	עבודה ערבית شغل عَرَب	Ron Ninio; Shay Capon	Comedy, Drama.
2014	State of Palestine		الروح	Ammar Al-Talawi	
2016-2017	State of Palestine		الفدائي	Mohammed Khalifa	
2017	State of Palestine		بوابة السماء	Zoheir Mohamed El Efrangy	
2017-2018	Israel	Commandments	כיפת ברזל	Alon Zingman	Drama.
2019	Israel	Muna	מונא	Ori Sivan	Drama.
2019	Israel; United States	Our Boys	הנערים فتیان	Hagai Levi; Joseph Cedar; Tawfik Abu Wael	Drama. 2014 kidnapping and murders of Israeli teenagers, Kidnapping and murder of Mohammed Abu Khdeir
2020	United States	Messiah		Kate Woods; James McTeigue	Drama, Mystery, Thriller.
2022	Israel	The Lesson	שעת אפס	Eitan Zur	Drama.
2025	Israel		החמאם	Michael Alalu	Drama, Thriller.
2025	Israel	Disengagement	התנתקות	Laizy Shapiro	Drama, History. Israeli disengagement from the Gaza Strip, Implementing the disengagement plan

== Terrorism outside Israel/Palestine ==
=== Films ===
Year	Country	Main title (Alternative title)	Original title (Original script)	Director	Subject
1975	United States	Rosebud		Otto Preminger	Action, Adventure, Drama, Thriller.
1977	United States	Black Sunday		John Frankenheimer	Adventure, Crime, Drama, Thriller. Based on the novel Black Sunday.
1977	Israel	Operation Thunderbolt	מבצע יונתן	Menahem Golan	Action, Drama, History. Entebbe raid
1977	Israel; United States	Warhead		John O'Connor	Action, Adventure, War.
1981	United Kingdom; Nigeria; Kenya	Rise and Fall of Idi Amin		Sharad Patel	Biography, Crime, Drama, History, Thriller, War. Idi Amin, Entebbe raid
1986	United States; Israel	The Delta Force		Menahem Golan	Action, Adventure, Drama, Thriller, War. TWA Flight 847
1997	Canada	The Assignment		Christian Duguay	Action, Crime, Thriller. Carlos the Jackal, OPEC siege
1997	United States	Prefontaine		Steve James	Biography, Drama, Romance, Sport. Steve Prefontaine, Bill Dellinger, Munich massacre
2004	Germany; Canada	The Raspberry Reich		Bruce LaBruce	Comedy, Drama, Romance.
2005	France; Canada; United States	Munich		Steven Spielberg	Drama, History, Thriller. Based on the book Vengeance. Munich massacre, Mossad assassinations following the Munich massacre
2006	United Kingdom; Germany; United States	The Last King of Scotland		Kevin Macdonald	Biography, Drama, History, Thriller. Based on the novel The Last King of Scotland. Idi Amin, Entebbe raid
2018	United Kingdom; France; Malta; United States	Entebbe		José Padilha	Action, Drama, History, Thriller. Entebbe raid
2024	Germany; United States	September 5		Tim Fehlbaum	Drama, History, Thriller. Munich massacre, ESPN on ABC

=== Television films ===
Year	Country	Main title (Alternative title)	Original title (Original script)	Director	Subject
1976	United States	Victory at Entebbe		Marvin J. Chomsky	Action, Drama, History, Thriller. Entebbe raid
1976	United States	21 Hours at Munich		William Graham	Drama, History, Sport, Thriller. Based on a non-fiction book The Blood of Israel. Munich massacre
1977	United States	Raid on Entebbe		Irvin Kershner	Action, Drama, History. Entebbe raid
1986	Canada; United States; France	Sword of Gideon		Michael Anderson	Action, Drama, Thriller. Based on the book Vengeance. Munich massacre, Mossad assassinations following the Munich massacre
1988	United States	The Taking of Flight 847: The Uli Derickson Story		Paul Wendkos	Drama. Uli Derickson, TWA Flight 847
1989	United States	The Hijacking of the Achille Lauro		Robert L. Collins	Drama. Leon Klinghoffer, Achille Lauro hijacking
2012	Germany		München 72 – Das Attentat	Dror Zahavi	Crime, Drama, History. Munich massacre

=== Television series ===
Year	Country	Main title (Alternative title)	Original title (Original script)	Director	Subject
1990	Italy; France; United States; West Germany; United Kingdom	Voyage of Terror: The Achille Lauro Affair		Alberto Negrin	Drama, History, Thriller. Achille Lauro hijacking
2010	France; Germany	Carlos		Olivier Assayas	Biography, Crime, Drama, Thriller. Carlos the Jackal, Popular Front for the Liberation of Palestine, OPEC siege, Rue Toullier shootout
2025	Argentina; Israel	AMIA	המטרה: אמיא; Amia: el fin de la verdad	Guillermo Rocamora	Drama, Thriller. 1992 Buenos Aires Israeli embassy bombing, AMIA bombing
2025	Israel	Band of Spies	רשת מרגלים	Szentgyörgyi Bálint; Lawrence Gough	History, Thriller. Munich massacre, Mossad assassinations following the Munich massacre

== Spies ==
=== Films ===
Year	Country	Main title (Alternative title)	Original title (Original script)	Director	Subject
1964	Egypt	The Spy	الجاسوس	Niazi Mostafa	Thriller.
1965	Israel; West Germany	Trunk to Cairo	Einer spielt falsch	Menahem Golan	Crime, Drama, Thriller.
1973	France	Man in the Trunk	La Valise	Georges Lautner	Adventure, Comedy.
1974	United Kingdom; West Germany	The Odessa File		Ronald Neame	Drama, Thriller. Based on the novel The Odessa File.
1978	West Germany; Israel; Italy	The Uranium Conspiracy	Agenten kennen keine Tränen; A chi tocca, tocca...! קשר האורניום	Gianfranco Baldanello; Menahem Golan	Action, Drama, Thriller.
1978	Egypt	Climbing to the Bottom	الصعود إلى الهاوية	Kamal El Sheikh	Biography, Drama. Heba Selim
1978	Egypt	I Want Love and Tenderness	أريد حبا وحنانا	Nagdi Hafez	Drama, Romance, Thriller.
1982	United States	The Soldier		James Glickenhaus	Action, Adventure, Thriller.
1984	United States	The Little Drummer Girl		George Roy Hill	Drama. Based on the novel The Little Drummer Girl.
1985	Egypt	Execution of a Dead Man	إعدام ميت	Ali Abdel-Khalek	Drama, Thriller. Shimon Peres Negev Nuclear Research Center
1987	Egypt	Well of Treason	بئر الخيانة	Ali Abdel-Khalek	Drama, Thriller.
1992	Egypt	Mission in Tel Aviv	مهمة في تل أبيب	Nader Galal	Action, Thriller.
1992	Egypt	Spy Trap	فخ الجواسيس	Ashraf Fahmy	Drama, Thriller.
1994	France	The Patriots	Les patriotes	Éric Rochant	Drama, Thriller.
1997	United States; Israel	Minotaur	מינוטאור	Jonathan Tammuz	Romance, Thriller. Based on the novel Minotaur.
1998	Egypt		48 ساعة في إسرائيل	Nader Galal	Drama, Thriller.
1999	Egypt		الكافير	Ali Abdel-Khalek	
1999	Egypt		أمن دولة	Nader Galal	Action, Drama.
2005	Israel	Jewish Revenge 3: Mission in Nepal	הנקמה היהודית 3: משימה בנפאל	Yehuda Grovais	Action.
2008	Israel	Chameleon Power 1: Danger at Sea	כח זיקית 1: סכנה בלב ים	Maor Harush; Ofer Ben-Shabat; Ariel Cohen	
2009	Egypt	Escaping Tel Aviv	ولاد العم	Sherif Arafa	Action, Adventure, Drama, Thriller.
2009	Israel	Chameleon Power 2: The Crystal	כח זיקית 2: הגביש	Maor Harush; Ofer Ben-Shabat; Ariel Cohen	
2009	Israel	Chameleon Power 3: The Moment of Truth	כח זיקית 3: רגע האמת	Maor Harush; Ofer Ben-Shabat; Ariel Cohen	
2010	Israel	Chameleon Power 4: Reveal the Shadow Vertex	כח זיקית 4: לחשוף את קודקוד צל	Maor Harush; Ofer Ben-Shabat; Ariel Cohen	
2011	Egypt		الفيل في المنديل	Ahmed Elbadry	Comedy, Drama.
2011	Egypt		أمن دولت	Khorm Farid	Comedy. Based on the movie The Pacifier.
2017	United Kingdom	Damascus Cover		Daniel Zelik Berk	Mystery, Thriller. Based on the novel Damascus Cover.
2018	Israel; United Kingdom; Egypt	The Angel		Ariel Vromen	Action, Biography, Drama, Thriller. Based on the book The Angel: The Egyptian Spy Who Saved Israel. Ashraf Marwan
2019	France; Israel; Germany; United States; United Kingdom	The Operative		Yuval Adler	Action, Drama, Mystery, Thriller. Based on the novel The English Teacher.
2019	Israel; United States; Japan; United Kingdom; Russia	Mossad	המוסד	Alon Gur Arye	Action, Comedy.
2025	India	Tehran		Arun Gopalan	Action, Thriller. 2012 attacks on Israeli diplomats

=== Television films ===
Year	Country	Main title (Alternative title)	Original title (Original script)	Director	Subject
1987	United Kingdom; United States	The Impossible Spy		Jim Goddard	Biography, Drama, Thriller. Eli Cohen
1988	United States	Steal the Sky		John D. Hancock	Action, Romance, War. Operation Diamond

=== Television series ===
Year	Country	Main title (Alternative title)	Original title (Original script)	Director	Subject
1980	Egypt	Tears on Bold Eyes	دموع في عيون وقحة	Yehia El Alami	Drama, History, War. General Intelligence Service (Egypt), Mohamed Abdul Salam Mahgoub, Shimon Peres, Gumaa Al-Shawan
1982	Egypt	Dalia the Egyptian	داليا المصرية	Refaat Qaldas	Drama.
1988/1990/1992	Egypt		رأفت الهجان	Yehia El Alami	Drama, History, War. General Intelligence Service (Egypt), Refaat Al-Gammal
1993	Egypt		الثعلب	Ahmed Khedr	General Intelligence Service (Egypt), Rifaat Jibril
1994	Egypt	Falling in Sabei Well	السقوط في بئر سبع	Nour El-Demerdash	Drama, History, War. Based on the novel Ibrahim and Inshirah. General Intelligence Service (Egypt), Ibrahim Shaheen and Inshirah Moussa
1996-1997	Israel; Argentina		המוסד	Uncle Moore	Drama.
1999	Egypt		وادي فيران	Alaa Karim	Drama.
2002	Egypt		وحلقت الطيور نحو الشرق	Hany Ismail	
2005	Egypt	Agent 1001	العميل 1001	Shereen Adel	Biography, Drama, History, Thriller.
2009	Syria		رجال الحسم	Najdat Anzour	Action, Drama, War.
2009	Egypt		حرب الجواسيس	Nader Galal	Thriller.
2011	Egypt		عابد كرمان	Nader Galal	Thriller. Based on the book I was a friend of Dayan. Abdelrahim Qarman
2012	Egypt		الصفعة	Magdy Abu Emeira	Drama.
2014	United Kingdom; United States	The Honourable Woman		Hugo Blick	Drama, Thriller.
2015-2022	Israel	False Flag	כפולים	Oded Ruskin; Oded Raz	Drama, Thriller.
2015-now	Israel	Fauda	פאודה	Assaf Bernstein; Rotem Shamir; Omri Givon	Action, Crime, Drama, Thriller, War.
2017	Egypt	The Mercury	الزيبق	Wael Abdallah	Action.
2018	United Kingdom; United States	The Little Drummer Girl		Park Chan-wook	Drama, Thriller. Based on the novel The Little Drummer Girl.
2019	France; United States	The Spy		Gideon Raff	Biography, Drama, History, Thriller. Based on the book L'espion qui venait d'Israël. Eli Cohen
2020-now	Israel; United States; United Kingdom; Greece	Tehran	טהרן	Daniel Syrkin	Action, Crime, Drama, Thriller. Israel and the nuclear program of Iran
2022-2023	Argentina	Yosi, the Regretful Spy	Iosi, el espía arrepentido	Daniel Burman; Sebastián Borensztein; Martín Hodara	Drama, History, Thriller. Based on the book Iosi, el espía arrepentido: la confesión del policía federal infiltrado en la comunidad judía. Andinia Plan, 1992 Buenos Aires Israeli embassy bombing, AMIA bombing

== Nakba ==
=== Films ===
Year	Country	Main title (Alternative title)	Original title (Original script)	Director	Subject
1973	Syria	The Dupes	المخدوعون	Tewfik Saleh	Drama. Based on the novel Men in the Sun.
1977	Syria	Red, White and Black	الأحمر والأبيض والأسود	Bashir Safiya	Drama.
1993	Syria	Something Is Burning	شيء ما يحترق	Ghassan Shamit	Drama.
2000	Egypt		الشرف	Mohamed Shaban	Crime. Based on the story Houses Behind the Trees.
2012	State of Palestine; Jordan; Greece; United Arab Emirates	When I Saw You	لما شفتك	Annemarie Jacir	Drama.
2018	France; Sweden; Norway	The Tower	Tårnet	Mats Grorud	Animation, Drama.
2023	Germany; State of Palestine; Netherlands; United Kingdom	A House in Jerusalem		Muayad Alayan	Drama.

== Uncategorized ==
=== Films ===
Year	Country	Main title (Alternative title)	Original title (Original script)	Director	Subject
1987	Israel	I Don't Give a Damn	לא שם זין	Shmuel Imberman	Drama, War. Based on the novel I Don't Give a Damn.
1991	Israel; France	The Deserter's Wife	La femme du déserteur	Michal Bat-Adam	Drama. Gulf War
2001	United States; Germany	The Body		Jonas McCord	Drama, Mystery, Romance, Thriller. Based on the novel The Body.
2005	France; Israel; Belgium; Italy	Live and Become	Va, vis et deviens	Radu Mihăileanu	Drama. Operation Moses
2010	United States; United Kingdom	The Imperialists Are Still Alive!		Zeina Durra	Drama.
2015	United States	Four Blood Moons		Kieth Merrill	Drama, History.
