= Mohamed Rafie =

Egyptian writer

- Born: 16 July 1972 (age 53) Al-Zaher district, Cairo
- Citizenship: Egypt
- Occupations: Journalist and writer

Mohamed Ali Rafie (Arabic: محمد علي رفيع) is an Egyptian novelist, screenwriter and writer, born in Al-Daher neighborhood in Cairo in 1972. He has a number of printed story collections, the most famous of which are Honey Noun and The Possessiveness of Water. He wrote his first book in collaboration with two friends, entitled “The Path of the Pavements”. Later, he wrote a collection of short stories entitled “Ibn Bahr” and a few years later another collection of short stories entitled “The Pomp of Water”. He formed many literary groups with his writer friends.

He holds a bachelor's degree in computers from the Faculty of Science from Suez Canal University, but he was inclined to theatre, so he established a theater group with his friends in the college. Then he turned to writing after several workshops and seminars he attended and studied at the Academy of Modern Film Technology of Arts, script department until he graduated in 2003.

== Foundation ==
He was born in Al-Zahir neighborhood in the heart of Cairo in 1972 and lived his study life in Ras Ghareb, the oil city in the Egyptian Red Sea Governorate, after his father moved to work as an English language teacher in the city, but he was interested in the idea of the city's future if the oil ran out of it, so he headed to the desert in search of Mining times and searching for farming times.

Mohamed lived with his father those exploratory tours in the desert, which eventually led to the discovery of a new city between Ras Ghareb and Hurghada called Wadi Dara as the first agricultural city in the governorate, but it did not grow on the ground in a real way until after the father's departure. Mohamed inherited from his father the spirit of adventure and a holistic view of the world. He loved reading and contemplation, and his presence in that remote area helped him. A special relationship developed between him and the sea. He roamed the coasts and spent the sea day and night fishing once and diving once until the sea became his only hobby, as he lived with his parents directly on the sea.

He studied computer science at the Faculty of Science at Suez Canal University in 1995 and graduated from it, in which he created with his friends a theater group representing the Faculty of Science and set out with the Ismailia Troupe to play small roles in its theater of mass culture and cultural palaces. With this group, he performed performances in Ismailia and Alexandria in which he met the director Wael Ihsan, discoverer of the character of Al-Lambi and director of youth films, but studies prevented him from continuing his theatrical journey. Mohamed returned to Hurghada, the tourist city with his parents. He works in several fields and writes short stories and diligently sends them on the Internet, as studying the computer allowed him to work on the Internet. Early, however, he moved to Cairo in search of a living in 1997, after two years he spent in Hurghada, working in tourism once and fishing in Cairo, the capital of culture. He got acquainted with the cultural center. He attended various seminars in Cairo as a seminar for the writer Mohamed Jibril and the symposium of the novelist Alaa Al-Aswany and the olive workshop with the poet Shaaban Youssef, and he issued the first joint book with two friends of his entitled “Bahr Al-Rasef” and then followed it with a collection of short stories entitled “Ibn Bahr” and a few years later another collection of stories entitled “The Pomp of Water” and in the meantime many of the Literary groups with his book friends, such as Risha and Kartas, the Civilized Observatory for Cultural Development, and the International Novel Group that specialized in Nobel novels such as Naguib Mahfouz and Marquis, the Turkish Orhan Pamuk and other writers such as Patrick Suskind and Milan Kundera.

He got acquainted with the script craft for the first time at the hands of the director Hussein Helmy Al-Mohandes, and here he realized that the image's power over the formation of people's awareness, so he went to study the script, which is the branch attached to writing by the director Raafat Al- Mihi, to find himself a student at the hands of the philosopher of cinema and the founder of fantasy in cinema. His knowledge and noted a convergence intellectually between him and his father Professor "high" to discover later that they graduate at one time with Mr. Hamdi Alkanese and drink from the bar and one in the sixties of the last century, the study lasted two books in which short films scenarios taken from literature Naguib Mahfouz, such as Taoist "kidnapped dish And a "miracle" and graduated from the academy with a scenario of Giftun inspired by the life of fishermen in Hurghada.

Then wrote articles in film criticism in Crescent monthly magazine for two years, most notably the study of poetry and art VII published in the special issue prepared by Crescent magazine on the occasion of 100 years Cinema, known as Ahmed Alhawan known as collecting Shawan during the preparation of a documentary film about it in 2008 and established With him, the so-called affiliation caravan roams the Egyptian cities and villages to promote the spirit of belonging among the Egyptian youth.

Mohamed Rafie says, “When I met thousands of young people from villages and universities and saw their enthusiasm, I realized that the youth of Egypt will create its future, and they did not and will not falter in their patriotic hearts as I thought, and the 2011 revolution did not stop and prove this clearly.” After the revolution, I finished my novel, The Coast of Seduction, and published it in the midst of raging events. The novel did not deal with the revolution as a political act, but rather with human rebellion against all forms of restrictions.

== Business and publications ==
=== In the field of literature ===
- Bouh the sidewalks "story collection", 2003
- Ibn Bahr "story collection", 2005
- The Pomp of Water “story collection", 2009
- The Coast of Seduction "Novel", 2011
- Honey Noon "Story Collection", 2015

=== In the field of film script ===
He wrote many scripts, including:

- "The Container Kidnapped the Dish"
- "Miracle" about the stories of the great writer Naguib Mahfouz.
- "Gavon" is a story made specifically for the cinema.
- Wrote the script for the documentary film "Secrets of Life"
- The short feature film "Madad Ya Tahira"
- The feature film Karma directed by Khaled Youssef

He has had a script-teaching workshop in central Cairo for ten years, from which many film and literature professionals graduated, including Mohamed Sadek, owner of the movie “Hepta”, and Enas Lotfy, author of “Bushri Ragel” and Shaima Al Maryah, the novelist and screenwriter, among others.

=== In the field of film criticism ===
He publishes film criticism and general articles on the art of cinema in the monthly Al-Hilal magazine, Black and White magazine, the Film magazine, and other Egyptian and Arab magazines and newspapers.

=== Memberships ===
Member of the Egyptian Film Syndicate, Screenplay Department.

Member of the Story Club in Cairo, the Egyptian Writers Union and Cairo Atelier, the Syndicate of Film Professions.

== Awards and honors ==
- He received the Sawiris Literary Foundation award for the best short story collection for the youth branch for the year 2012, which is the Pomp of Water.
- His short-listed collection of short stories, Honey Noon, was shortlisted for the Arab Forum Award in Kuwait 2016.
- He was honored at the Egyptian Writers Conference held in the Red Sea Governorate, the Creative Olive Workshop in Cairo and at the Amiri Palace in Kuwait for his literary product, in addition to many Egyptian literary forums.
- He was honored in Russia at the Chekhov Conference 2019 and was awarded the Conference Gold Medal.
