= Amir Gutfreund =

Israeli writer (1963–2015)

- אמיר גוטפרוינד
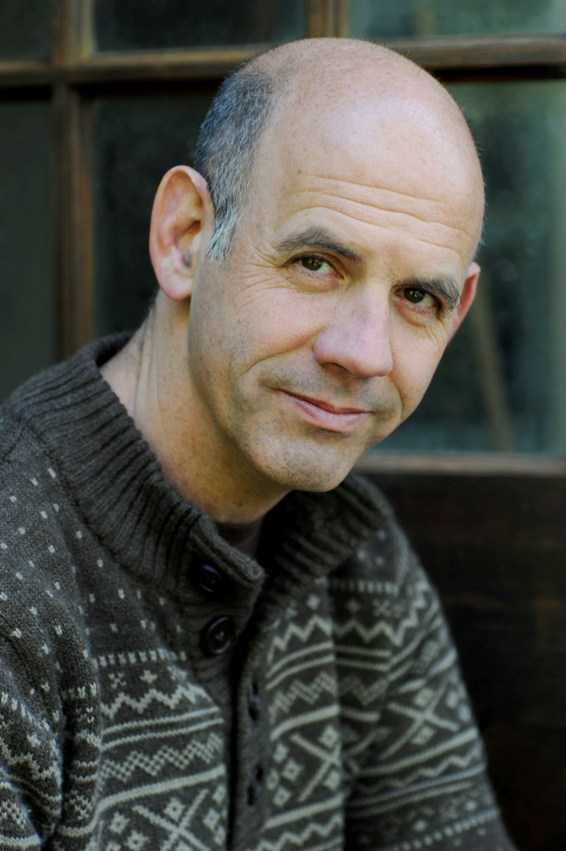
- Gutfreund in February 2013
- Born: 23 July 1963; Haifa, Israel
- Died: 27 November 2015 (aged 52); Haifa, Israel
- Occupation: Columnist
- Writing career
- Language: Hebrew
- Notable works: Our Holocaust, The World, a Little Later, When Heroes Fly
- Notable awards: Buchman Prize (2001), Sapir Prize (2003), Jewish Quarterly-Wingate Prize (2009), Ramat Gan Prize for Literature (2015)

Amir Gutfreund (Hebrew: אמיר גוטפרוינד; 23 July 1963 – 27 November 2015) was an Israeli writer and columnist for the Maariv newspaper.

== Books ==
- 2000: Our Holocaust (novel, translated into German, English, French, Czech and Hungarian)
- 2002: אחוזות החוף Ahuzot HaHof or The Shoreline Mansions (short story collection)
- 2005:העולם, קצת אחר כך The World, a Little Later (novel)
  - In English: The World a Moment Later (translated by Jessica Cohen, Toby Press)
- 2008: בשבילה גיבורים עפים Heroes Fly to Her / When Heroes Fly (novel)
- 2013: מזל עורב Crow
- 2014: אגדת ברונו ואדלה (Agadát Bruno VeAdela), The Legend of Bruno and Adela
- 2016: הר האושר Mount of Happiness / Mount of Beatitudes (unfinished, posthumous)

== Awards ==
- 2001: Buchman Prize for Our Holocaust
- 2003: Sapir Prize for Ahuzot HaHof
- 2009: Jewish Quarterly-Wingate Prize for The World a Moment Later
- 2015: Ramat Gan Prize for Literature for The Legend of Bruno and Adela

== Influence ==
- When Heroes Fly, Israeli drama TV series based on the novel Heroes Fly to Her. The series won Best Series at the first Canneseries Festival in April 2018.
  - Echo 3, an English-language TV series based on the Israeli series
- The Matchmaker (2010 film) (Hebrew: פעם הייתי, lit. "Once I Was", Once Upon a Time I Was), inspired by the novel When Heroes Fly
