= Our Holocaust =

Non-fiction book

- Author: Amir Gutfreund
- Publication date: 2000

Our Holocaust is the first book published by the Israeli author Amir Gutfreund. The book was published in the year 2000 and was awarded the Buchman Award in 2001.

The book describes the story of the Holocaust as it slowly unfolds for two Israeli youngsters: Amir (based on the author) and his girlfriend Efi. Although some of the stories are true and some of the characters are based on people the author knew, some of the Jewish and German characters are fictional, so this is not an autobiographical novel.

Amir Gutfreund's novel Our Holocaust (Sho'a Shelanu) has been translated into five languages: The book is recommended as part of a bibliography for Holocaust studies and remembrance.

== Plot summary ==
In a small neighborhood, on the edge of the northern Israeli suburb of Kiryat Haim, Holocaust survivors gather. Everyone has difficult Holocaust stories and are at different levels of mental and emotional stability. The thing that unites them is the Holocaust, and young couples who tried to live in the neighborhood abandoned it in a short time. Whoever lost more in the Holocaust is valued higher; the loss of one's spouse does not count, the loss of one's child is not enough. Katzenelson Street runs through the center of the neighborhood and the residents are convinced that the reference is to the Holocaust poet Yitzhak Katzenelson rather than a noted Labor Zionist leader.

Amir's parents also went through the Holocaust and most of their family perished. They apply the so-called "rule of compression", and adopt their distant relatives and give them the title of grandfather. Among the grandfathers are:

- Grandpa Lolek, who fled the Germans to the Soviet Union, enlisted in Anders' army and survived the Battle of Monte Cassino.
- Grandpa Yosef, who survived 12 concentration and extermination camps and after the war found his fiancée Feige. They got married and had a son, Moshe, who was autistic.
- Attorney Perl, who was a well-known attorney in Lviv before the war. After surviving the Holocaust, he came to the neighborhood and opened a plumbing supplies store. He dedicates his life to tracking down Nazi criminals, most of whom were not brought to justice or died with light sentences.
- Lebertov, a Holocaust survivor who is addicted to "Formacyl" pills.

The younger generation had a rule that "food is not thrown away." At first, they didn't explain why, but later it turned out that the reasons were "because people died for one potato" or "people betrayed their parents for a bit of cabbage."

There was an unwritten agreement not to tell children about the horrors of the Holocaust, and in response to the children's questions, they were told that they "need to come of age."

The first to break the taboo on Holocaust stories is Lebertov, thanks to the "Formacyl" pills that Amir and Efi steal from Feiga and give to him. He tells them about his time in Treblinka and introduces them to the deputy commander of the camp, the sadistic SS Unterstrumpführer Frank Kurt, known as "Bubba." To speed up the old men on their way to the gas chambers, he built a device at the beginning of the route with a Red Cross symbol on it. Inside the device was only a pit. "Bubba" would convince the old man to come with him to the device, where he would shoot him and throw him into the pit. Sometimes he could not resist his murderous urge and would strangle the old man on the way to the device. He enjoyed going to the cesspools, shooting Jews there and watching them fall into the cesspool.

Over time, the other survivors also "open up," and Amir begins to document them, including his father. The Holocaust he discovers is different from what is recognized every year on Holocaust Memorial Day with sirens and school ceremonies.

There were also good and bad Jews. There were those who supported their comrades during the difficult times in the extermination camps, and on the other hand there were sadistic Kapos. Amir gets to know Kapo Hermann Donewitz (a fictional character, based on real events) who was no less a murderer and sadist than the SS men. To his horror, he finds out that Donewitz fled to Canada after the war and that he was the grandfather of his wife Anat.

Another character in the book is a German named Hans Odermann, who is doing research on orphans and Grandpa Josef agrees to host him in his home. It turns out that Hans's father is a Levensborn boy who does not know his origins and has suffered greatly from it, like hundreds of thousands of children born according to Himmler's diabolical plan that promised his Führer one hundred and twenty million Aryan Germans by 1980.

== Reviews ==
The book has received a range of reviews, with reviewers noting the writing as excellent, and the story as moving.

The novel has won recognition for its literary merit. It received the 2001 Buchman Prize for Holocaust literary works from Yad Vashem and was a runner-up for the 2007 Sami Rohr Prize for Jewish Literature.
