= Refaat Al-Gammal =

Egyptian spy (1927–1982)

Raafat al-Haggan
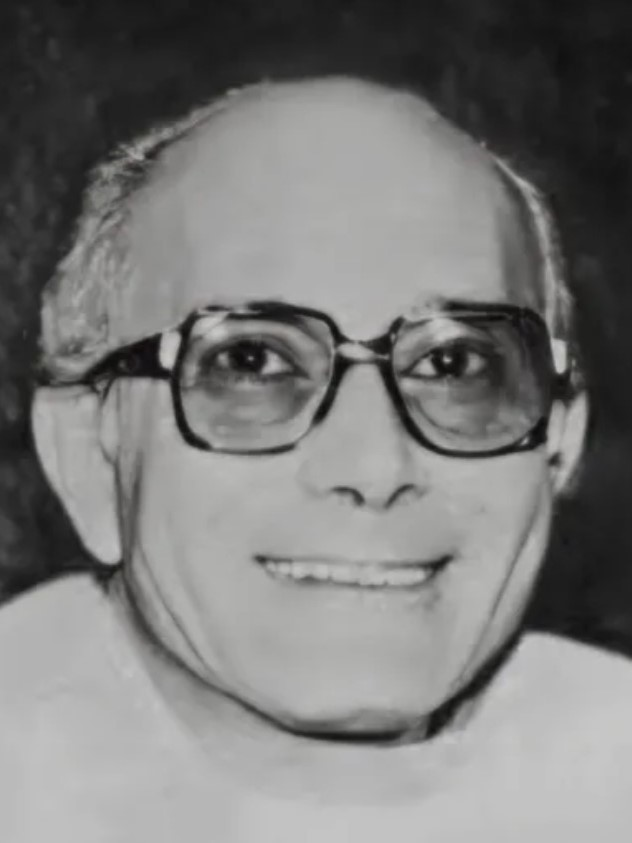
- Raafat Al-Haggan in the 1970s
- Born: Refaat Ali Suleiman Al-Gammal; July 1, 1927; Damietta, Kingdom of Egypt
- Died: January 30, 1982 (aged 54); Götzenhain, Hesse, West Germany
- Burial place: Darmstadt, Hesse, West Germany
- Other names: Jack Bitton, Charles Denon, Daniel Caldwell, Ali Mostafa
- Occupations: Spy, Businessman, former Actor
- Known for: Infiltrating Israeli society for 17 years as an Egyptian intelligence agent
- Criminal charges: None (officially); arrested for identity fraud before recruitment
- Criminal status: Cleared and recruited by Egyptian intelligence
- Spouse: Waltraud Bitton (m. 1963–1982)
- Espionage activity
- Country: Egypt
- Allegiance: Egypt
- Service branch: Egyptian General Intelligence Directorate
- Agency: Egyptian Intelligence Service
- Service years: 1956–1973
- Codename: Raafat Al-Haggan
- Israeli identity: Jack Bitton
- Alias: Charles Denon
- Alias: Daniel Caldwell
- Alias: Ali Mostafa
- Operations: Long-term infiltration of Israeli society
- Other work: Provided crucial intel to Egypt before the Six-Day War and Yom Kippur War; linked to the exposure of Eli Cohen

Refaat Ali Suleiman al-Gammal (Arabic: رفعت علي سليمان الجمال; born on July 1, 1927 — died on January 30, 1982), better known for his code name "Raafat al-Haggan" (Arabic: رأفت الهجّان), was an Egyptian intelligence officer regarded as one of the most prominent agents of the Egyptian General Intelligence Directorate (EGID). He was operating under the alias "Jacques Bitton" (Hebrew: ג'ק ביטון), and he lived in Israel for 17 years and embedded himself in local society. Egyptian intelligence selected the surname "Bitton" because it is common among Jews of Moroccan and other North African origins, which strengthened the plausibility of his cover.

According to Israeli intelligence records, "Jacques Bitton" was regarded as a highly skilled Egyptian agent. Egypt's official account states that Refaat al-Gammal (Raafat al-Haggan) was sent to Israel in a long operation that began in 1956 and continued into the early 1970s. During this period he ran a tourism business in Tel Aviv, gained social standing, and passed intelligence to Egypt. He was credited for reporting the start date of the 1967 Six-Day War and technical details regarding the Bar Lev Line used in planning for the October 1973 War. He is treated in Egypt as a national figure. Some details of his activities remain classified.

Celebrated in Egypt as a national hero, Raafat al-Haggan's story was contested in Israel. Some Israeli accounts described him as a double agent, a claim Egyptian officials rejected as disinformation. After his mission, he retired, lived in West Germany, and died in 1982. His identity became public when Egyptian state television aired Raafat al-Haggan in 1988, with Mahmoud Abdel Aziz in the lead role. Israeli officials initially dismissed the series as fiction, later acknowledging that Jacques Bitton had spied for Egypt while contending that Israeli security suffered limited damage. Early intelligence statements characterized Egypt's version as a fabricated tale, yet former Mossad chief Isser Harel later said authorities sensed a deep penetration at high levels without suspecting Bitton.

Since 1988, Israeli media have sought to identify Bitton/Al-Haggan. The Jerusalem Post reported that he was Refaat al-Gammal, an Egyptian Jew born in Mansoura in 1919 who arrived in Israel in 1955 and left in 1973. Reports state that he cultivated ties with senior officials, including David Ben-Gurion, Golda Meir, Moshe Dayan, and Ezer Weizman, and that he even considered running for the Knesset. In a later book, The Spies: Israel's Counterintelligence Wars, Eitan Haber and Yossi Melman are cited as confirming many elements of the Egyptian account while adding the claim that he also cooperated with Israeli intelligence and served both sides.

== Early life ==
According to the EGID, Refaat Ali Suleiman al-Gammal was born on 1 July 1927 in the city of Damietta, Kingdom of Egypt (nowadays the Arab Republic of Egypt). He was born into a well-off family that worked in the wholesale coal trade. His father, Ali al-Gammal (Arabic: علي الجمال), was a coal merchant, while his mother, Rateeba Ali Abu Awad (Arabic: رتيبة علي أبو عوض), was a well-educated homemaker from an upper-class background who was fluent in both English and French. Refaat had three siblings: Sami, Labib, and Naziha. After the death of their father in 1936, his elder half-brother Sami took responsibility for supporting the family. Sami worked as a private English tutor for the brothers of Queen Farida, the consort of Egypt's King Farouk, a circumstance that allowed Refaat to be exposed to the English language from an early age. Coupled with his mother's fluency in French, he himself mastered both English and French fluently while still a school student.

After his father's death, Refaat al-Gammal and his family relocated to the Heliopolis district of Cairo, where he spent the remainder of his childhood. From a young age, he was noted for his sharp intelligence and adventurous spirit, though he showed little interest in formal education. According to accounts from those close to him, Refaat was indifferent to academic study and deeply passionate about the arts, especially cinema and theater.

At fourteen, under family pressure and because of his practical interests, he enrolled in a commercial secondary school. During the mid-1940s he followed news of the World War II and expressed admiration for the British war effort. He studied English to near-native fluency with a British accent and improved his French with a Parisian teacher. His interest in acting also grew. On a school visit to a film studio he entered the dressing room of the actor Bishara Wakim, imitated a scene, and received advice to complete his education before pursuing acting, which he later credited with motivating him to finish school. al-Gammal completed a commercial secondary diploma in 1946 and briefly worked in film. He appeared in small roles including in productions with Beshara Wakim. During this period he had a first serious relationship with a teenage dancer named Betty; some sources identify her as the dancer Kitty. Their relationship became serious, and al-Gammal moved in with her, a step at odds with prevailing family and social norms. The decision angered his brother Labib and strained family relations. He later left both Betty and cinema work. Biographical accounts describe him at this stage as socially bold and adept at persuasion, traits later noted in narratives about his intelligence work.

He graduated in 1946 and worked as an accountant for a Red Sea oil company before being dismissed over an allegation of theft. He then held several short-term jobs and became assistant to an accounting officer on the ship Horus, which took him abroad for the first time, with stops in Naples, Genoa, Marseille, Barcelona, Tangier and eventually Liverpool. In Liverpool he joined a tourism firm, later entering the United States without a visa and moving on to Canada and Germany. At the Egyptian consulate in Germany he was accused of selling his passport and denied travel documents, after which German authorities deported him to Egypt. Lacking both employment and identification, he obtained black-market papers under the name "Ali Mostafa" and found work with the Suez Canal company.

After the 1952 revolution, British authorities tightened controls on document fraud. Fearing exposure, al-Gammal left his job, obtained a new forged passport from a Swiss journalist, and used several aliases. In 1953 a British officer detained him en route to Libya while he was carrying a British passport in the name "Danial Caldwell". Believing he might be Israeli, the officer transferred him to Egyptian intelligence. Investigators alleged he had posed as a Jewish officer, "David Artson", and also found checks signed "Refaat al-Gammal", noting his fluent Arabic. Under questioning by officer Hassan Hosny, he disclosed his real identity and described his activities and contacts.

== Working for the EGID ==
=== Recruitment and intelligence work ===
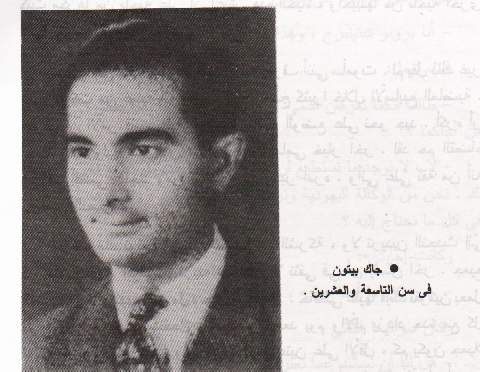
Jacques Bitton at the age of 29, 1956.

After confirming his identity, al-Gammal gave a detailed statement to Egyptian authorities. In interviews with officer Hassan Helmy, he said that while working in film he socialized with Egyptian Jews and, using his language skills and knowledge of their customs, and convinced some that he was Jewish. He also described his travel in England, France, and the United States, his repeated use of aliases, and his eventual return to Egypt.

Officer Hassan Hosni placed informants in al-Gammal's cell to learn whether Jewish inmates questioned his identity. They did not. After checking his background, the Egyptian General Intelligence Directorate concluded that he had strong skills in impersonation, cover, and social assimilation that could be used in intelligence work. Intelligence officers decided to recruit al-Gammal rather than prosecute him. They told him they needed someone with his skills to live in Israel and move within Jewish communities to gather information on activities hostile to Egypt. Officer Hassan Hosni approached him several times. Al-Gammal was given a choice between imprisonment and working for the Egyptian General Intelligence Directorate under a new identity.

In the early 1950s, Israel promoted immigration and capital inflows after its 1948 founding. Egyptian authorities alleged that some wealthy Egyptian Jews were moving large sums out of Egypt to Israel and sought an agent who could enter Jewish circles and identify the financing networks from within. Al-Gammal was told he fit the role. He asked what he would receive in return. Officials offered payment and expungement of his record. All charges linked to his aliases (Ali Mustafa, Charles Dennon, Daniel Caldwell, and others) would be dropped, his confiscated traveler's checks returned, and he would be permitted to adopt a Jewish identity without prosecution.

Al-Gammal agreed to work for the EGID and undertook training in political objectives of the revolution, basic economics and corporate practice, Jewish history and religion, social customs, surveillance photography with miniature cameras, radio communication, intelligence collection, hand-to-hand skills, and explosives. He was taught to distinguish Ashkenazi and Sephardi communities. He then assumed the cover of "Jacques Bitton", an Ashkenazi Jew said to have been born on 23 August 1919 to a French father and an Italian mother, and moved to Alexandria, where he lived in a largely Jewish neighborhood and took a job with an insurance company while building contacts in clandestine circles. Under this identity, he was issued an Israeli passport from Tel Aviv (no. 146742) and was assigned the Egyptian intelligence codename 313.

=== Infiltration into Israel ===
Accounts differ on who recruited and handled Refaat al-Gammal for insertion into Israel. Some sources credit Hassan Helmy Bulbul, with Abdel Mohsen Faqih as his assistant. Others name Major General Abdel Aziz El-Toudy, who is said to have maintained contact with al-Gammal during the mission. A third view holds that the operation was a team effort rather than the work of a single officer. He began his mission in Egypt by establishing a cover in Alexandria. He lived in a Jewish neighborhood and presented himself as a European Jew from West Germany and northern France. With support from Egyptian intelligence, he secured a position at an insurance company, which helped consolidate the credibility of his identity.

Al-Gammal received help from Levi Salama, an acquaintance from his time in prison, who introduced him to prominent members of Alexandria's Jewish community. These contacts reinforced his credibility and strengthened his cover. After his identity as a foreign Jew in Egypt was fully established, Egyptian intelligence arranged his transfer to Israel via France. He left Alexandria for Paris, then traveled to Tel Aviv on a forged foreign passport, arriving in June 1956, the date later recorded as the start of his long-term operation.

In Tel Aviv, using the name Jacques Bitton, he opened a travel and tourism agency that offered a practical cover for intelligence work. The business brought him into contact with wealthy clients and political figures and gave him legitimate reasons to travel to Europe. During those trips he met Egyptian intelligence officers, passed reports, and received new instructions.

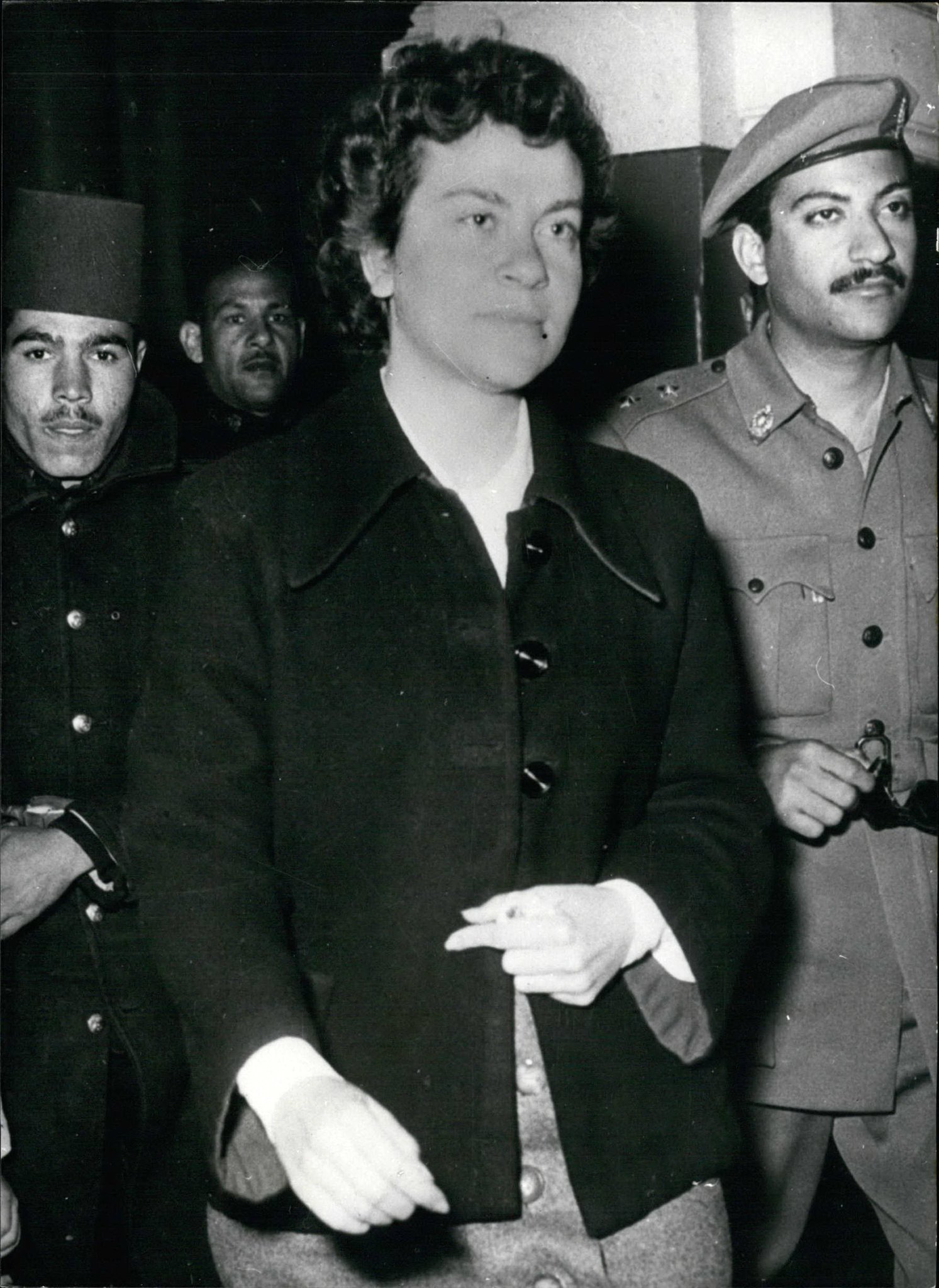
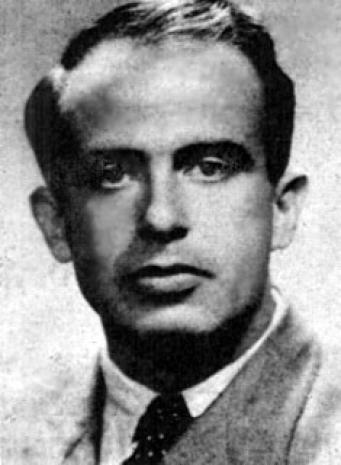
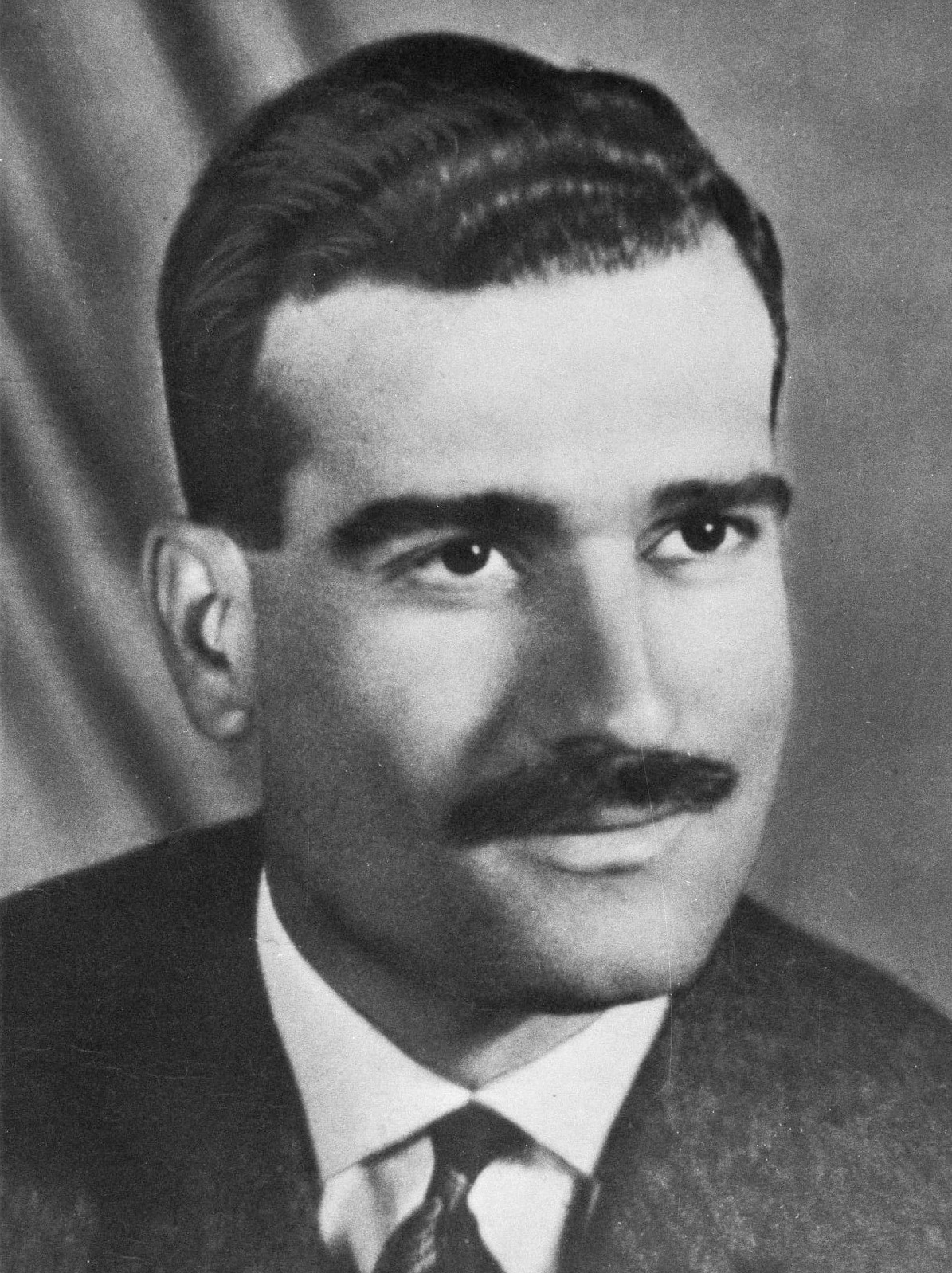
The three spies who worked for Israel and were known to al-Gammal were Marcel Nino, Meir Max Bennett, and Eli Cohen.

Before leaving for Israel, al-Gammal received $3,000 from Egyptian intelligence to establish himself and traveled via Rome, arriving in 1956 at age 28. In his memoirs, he states that while still in Alexandria he infiltrated Unit 131, a covert cell formed by Avraham Dar for Israeli military intelligence service (Aman), and that he worked with figures later known to Israeli operations, including Marcelle Ninio, Meir Max Bineth, and Eli Cohen.

Using the identity "Jacques Bitton," al-Gammal integrated into Israeli society over nearly seventeen years, from 1956 into the early 1970s. He operated a travel agency and developed contacts with high-ranking Israeli figures such as Moshe Dayan (Defense Minister), Ezer Weizman (Commander of the Air Force and later President of Israel), as well as business leaders and social elites.

According to Egyptian accounts, Bitton's social and business ties gave him access to sensitive information while sustaining his cover as a Tel Aviv travel agent. During this period he is said to have sent strategic reports to Cairo using pre-arranged encrypted channels or by meeting handlers abroad on business trips. Sources in that narrative also state that his tasks included tracking social and psychological trends within Israel, not only military matters.

Throughout his career under the cover name Jacques Bitton, al-Gammal undertook assignments in France, Italy, and Iraq. In 1965, during the presidency of Abdul Salam Arif, he was sent to Iraq within the proposed Egypt–Iraq–Syria Tripartite Union (United Arab Republic), which sought military integration through exchanges of army units and air squadrons. Egypt dispatched special forces and intelligence personnel, including al-Gammal. He later reflected on this period in his memoirs.

"Once again, I found myself at a critical turning point in my life. The idea of going into the heart of the lion's den terrified me. In Israel, there is no place to hide. If I were caught, it would be the end... They interrogate spies, then execute them. But I was already immersed in the role of Jacques Bitton. I loved the game, the performance, the thrill of espionage. I realized I had no other choice: either I would be caught and hanged, or I would succeed and deserve an Oscar."

According to the Egyptian narrative, al-Gammal's intelligence was pivotal in several major historical events. He reportedly warned Egyptian authorities in advance of the 1956 tripartite attack, though his alert was not acted upon with sufficient urgency. In May 1967, al-Gammal informed Cairo that Israel was preparing for a full-scale attack on Arab positions. However, some within the Egyptian leadership misinterpreted this as referring solely to Syria, and Sinai defenses were not adequately reinforced.

Egyptian accounts state that before the June 1967 War he warned of an imminent Israeli strike on Egyptian air bases, but the report was not acted upon amid conflicting intelligence. In later years he continued to provide information on Israeli military and technological projects. In a meeting in Milan with intelligence officer Ali Ghali, he reported Israeli plans for covert nuclear tests and the development of advanced weapons systems.

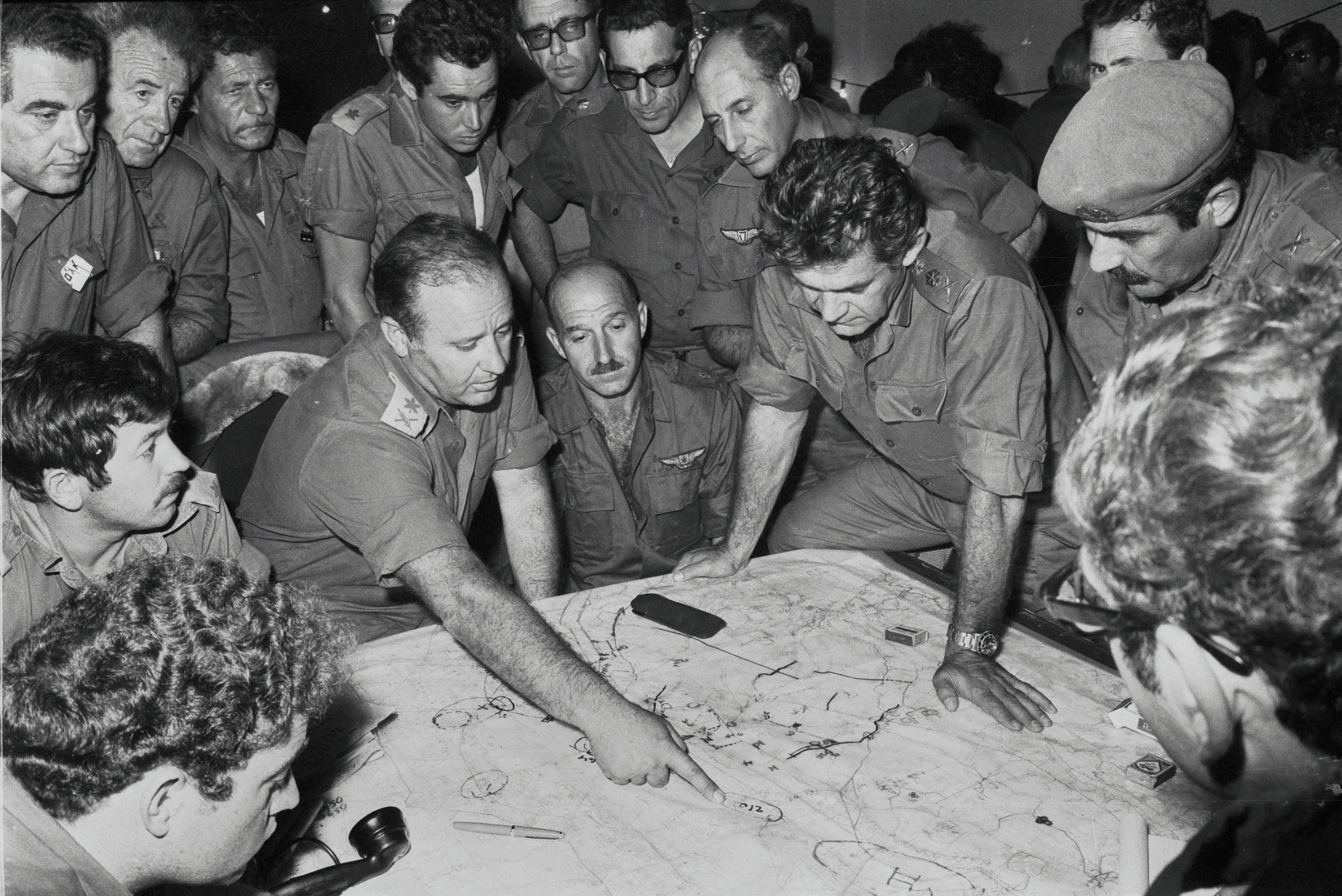
IDF Chief of Staff David Elazar with Northern Command during the Yom Kippur War. From right: Gadi Zohar; Yekutiel Adam; David Elazar; Eli Zeira; Rehavam Ze'evi (standing, dark glasses); Mordechai Hod; Yitzhak Hofi (pointing at map).

According to the same narrative, his intelligence played a crucial role in Egypt's preparation for the Operation Badr in 1973, especially in the early phase of the campaign. One of his most important contributions was providing detailed information about the Bar Lev Line, Israel's fortified defense system along the Suez Canal. His data helped the Egyptian military engineers to design the strategy that breached the line during the Yom Kippur War.

=== His role in the Lavon Affair ===
The Lavon Affair refers to the scandal over a failed Israeli covert operation in Egypt known as Operation Susannah, in which Egyptian, American and British-owned targets in Egypt were bombed in the summer of 1954. It became known as the Lavon Affair after the Israeli defense minister Pinhas Lavon, who was forced to resign because of the incident, or euphemistically as the Unfortunate Affair (Hebrew: עסק הביש Esek HaBish). Israel admitted responsibility in 2005. In his diaries, al-Gammal mentions that he joined Unit 131, which was to carry out the operation, along with many names which later proved to be of great importance, such as Eli Cohen, an Israeli spy who became an adviser to the defense minister in Syria. According to the EGID, al-Gammal had the major role in the discovery and arrest of the unit. Later, Cohen was discovered by Syrian counter-espionage experts that caught him in the act of sending a radio message after large amounts of radio interference brought attention.

=== Exposing the Eli Cohen network ===
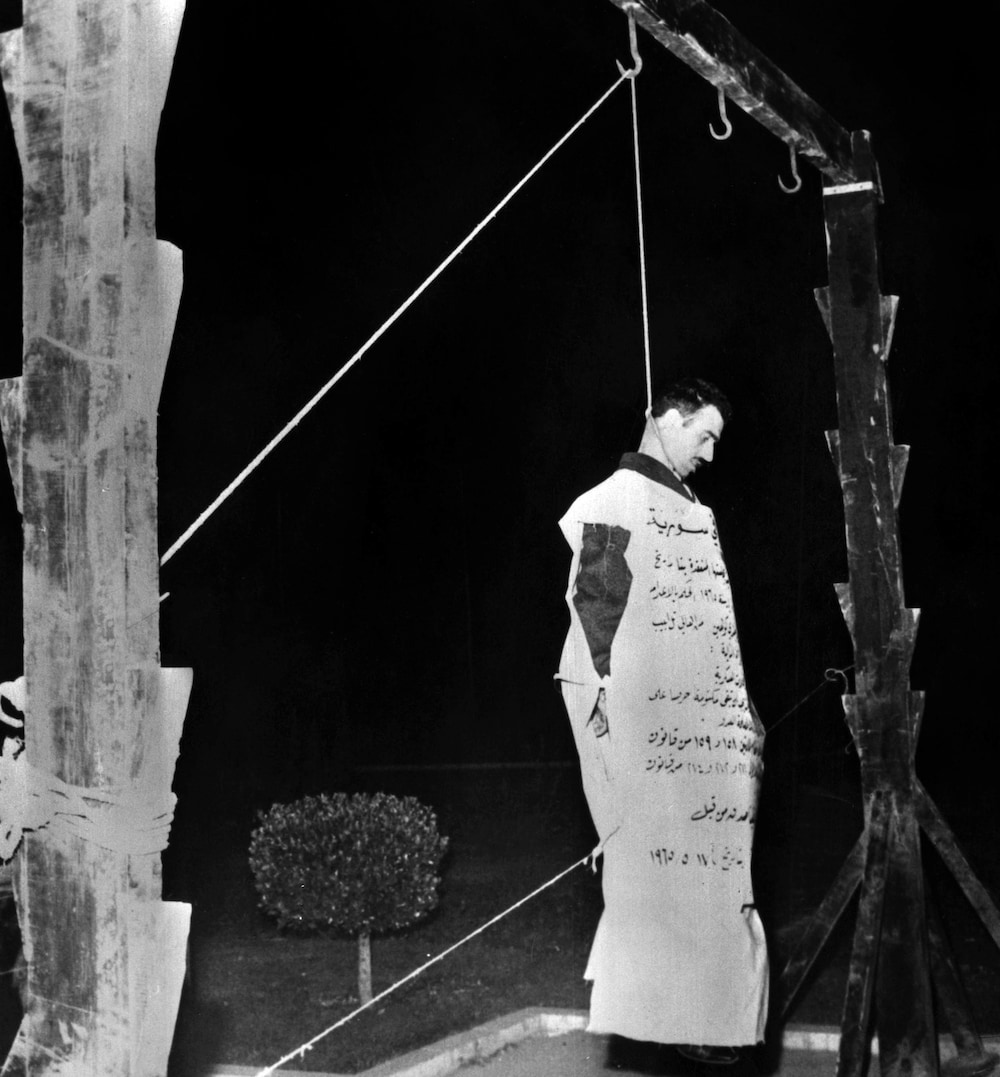
Execution of Eli Cohen by hanging at Marjeh Square, 18 May 1965.

One of the most remarkable episodes in al-Haggan's intelligence career that several accounts credited him with aiding the exposure of the Israeli agent Eli Cohen in Syria. According to his German wife who did not know that he was working for the EGID that during a trip back to Europe he saw a newspaper photo of a Syrian official named Kamel Amin Thaabet (Arabic: كامل أمين ثابت) standing with officers. Al-Gammal recognized the man as "Eli Cohen", whom he had met in an Egyptian prison in 1954 when both were detained on suspicion before being released. He reported to Egyptian intelligence that Thaabet was Cohen.

Egyptian authorities relayed the information to Syrian services, which were already watching Cohen. He was arrested in Damascus in 1965 and later executed. While Syria's official account attributes the arrest to radio interception and other technical surveillance, Egyptian sources state that al-Haggan's tip hastened the outcome.

=== End of mission and return to Egypt ===
Refaat al-Gammal continued his work in Israel into the early 1970s. As the October 1973 war drew near, Egyptian intelligence decided to wind down his operation quietly. Remaining in place had become risky, and a sudden reappearance in Cairo could attract Mossad attention and endanger other networks. Some accounts state that the solution was for "Jacques Bitton" to relocate to Europe for marriage and permanent residence. In October 1963, during a visit to Frankfurt, he met a German woman named Waltraud, and they began a relationship.

Waltraud, a 22-year-old divorcée with a daughter, knew only that her suitor was an Israeli businessman who ran a tourism company in Tel Aviv. They married soon after meeting in Frankfurt and lived in Tel Aviv for several years. By 1973, al-Gammal's mission had ended. After the October War he was no longer required to remain in Israel, and in early 1974 he left permanently for West Germany with his wife and their son, Daniel. He kept his assumed identity for security reasons.

His memoirs state that cooperation with Egyptian intelligence ceased in the mid-1970s. He later re-entered Egypt presenting himself as a foreign investor. In 1977 he received approval to explore for oil and founded Egypteco. He obtained a concession in the Western Desert. President Anwar Sadat received him and directed the petroleum minister to facilitate the project without revealing his identity. The Ministry of Petroleum granted rights to develop an abandoned field previously run by Philips Petroleum.

In January 1982, while ill with lung cancer, al-Gammal asked his wife, Waltraud, to continue her life and not wear black in mourning. After his death, his nephew, Mohamed al-Gammal, disclosed his true identity as an Egyptian intelligence operative in Israel. Waltraud had not been told of his work during their marriage.

== Controversy over his allegiance ==
In 2004, the Israeli newspaper Haaretz reported that Raafat al-Haggan (operating in Israel as Jacques Bitton) had acted as a double agent for the Mossad. The account states that Israeli security learned his identity soon after his arrival in the 1950s through suspicions raised by his business partner, Imri (or Imra) Farid, a retired security operative. According to this version, Israeli services placed him under surveillance, observed a meeting with an Egyptian agent in Europe, and detained him on his return.

Haaretz reported that he was given a choice between prison and cooperation as a controlled source who would pass to Egypt only information approved by Israel. His first test assignment was said to involve delivering photographs of selected Israeli military sites to Cairo to demonstrate compliance.

Israeli reports, including Haaretz, claim that before the 1967 Six-Day War al-Gammal misled Egyptian leaders by conveying that a future conflict would start with a ground offensive rather than a preemptive air strike, which they argue contributed to Egyptian aircraft being left exposed on runways. The same accounts say Mossad later arranged his safe exit by partnering him with an Italian businessman, and that in 2011 Israel's internal security service (Shin Bet) described his recruitment as a successful operation code-named "The Stake".

In 2002, Israeli journalists Yossi Melman and Eitan Haber published The Spies, which includes a chapter on Refaat al-Gammal. Their account departs from the Egyptian version: they write that Israeli services identified him early, recruited him as a double agent, and used his reports to disrupt Egyptian networks and to mislead Cairo ahead of the 1967 war, contributing to losses in the Egyptian Air Force. The Egyptian narrative rejects these claims, describing al-Gammal as loyal and arguing that, had he been turned, Israel would have detected preparations for Operation Badr in 1973. Egyptian commentators therefore characterize the Israeli account as propaganda aimed at diminishing his record.

According to The Spies and reporting in Yedioth Ahronoth, Egyptian intelligence recruited Refaat al-Gammal in the early 1950s after legal troubles and gave him the identity "Jacques Bitton". He entered Israel among Egyptian Jewish immigrants with instructions to settle, start a business, and collect information. Israel's internal security service, Shin Bet, is said to have flagged him for background irregularities, including unusually fluent French for a putative Egyptian Jew. A search allegedly uncovered invisible ink and a radio codebook. Senior officials from Shin Bet, Aman, and Mossad then decided to try to run him as a double agent.

The book states that in 1956 he opened a small travel agency, Sitour, on Brenner Street in Tel Aviv. Also, it was funded partly by Egyptian intelligence and partly by Shin Bet, which the authors cite as evidence of dual control. It also describes a personal life marked by frequent relationships. On a trip to Europe in October 1963 he met Waltraud, a divorced German woman with a young daughter, Andrea, and married her ten days later in a church ceremony.

Egyptian commentators rejected the Israeli account. They described it as an attempt to diminish al-Gammal's record. Major General Mohamed Rashad, a former Egyptian intelligence officer, called the claims counter-propaganda and said al-Gammal's reporting supported Egypt's preparations for the 1967 and 1973 wars. He maintained that al-Gammal was a fully controlled Egyptian asset.

Rashad further stated that al-Gammal embedded in Israeli society after systematic training and that he recruited senior military figures; other officials likewise asserted that ongoing monitoring never indicated compromise. Public discussion in Egypt largely favors this view, presenting Raafat al-Haggan as a national intelligence figure.

== Personal life ==
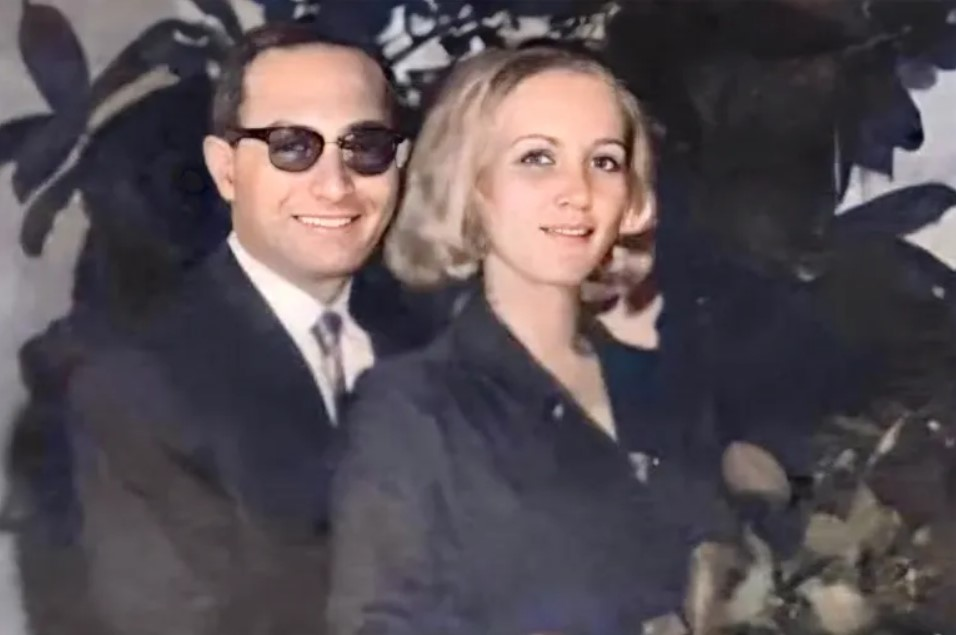
Rafat El Gammal and his wife Waltraud Beton, 1963.

In mid-October 1963, Refaat al-Gammal married Waltraud Bitton, his only documented spouse. Although he was known for several romantic relationships, he did not marry anyone else. They met in early October 1963 during a trip to Europe. Waltraud was a 22-year-old German divorcée with a four-year-old daughter, Andrea. About ten days later they held a church wedding. Although al-Gammal, under the identity "Jacques Bitton", had formally adopted Judaism in Israel, Waltraud offered to convert for the marriage and he declined. The couple remained married until his death in 1982. They had one son, Daniel Jacques Bitton, born in Germany, where al-Gammal preferred that the birth take place rather than in Israel.

Throughout the marriage, Waltraud knew her husband as Jacques Bitton, and believed he was a Jewish Israeli businessman. In late 1981 he was diagnosed with lung cancer, and his health declined rapidly. Some sources refer to a second wife named "Ally Walford", but later clarifications indicate this is another rendering of Waltraud's name and not a different person. The couple married in October 1963 and remained together until his death on 30 January 1982, a span of about 18 years and three months.

After his intelligence work ended, Refaat al-Gammal entered the petroleum sector and founded Egypteco. President Anwar Sadat instructed the petroleum minister to assist him under his alias Jacques Bitton without disclosing his identity. The ministry granted him the abandoned Mileha well, previously relinquished by Philips Petroleum. The Petroleum Authority required oil transport by pipeline rather than by tanker truck, which he could not finance. Sadat reiterated his request for support, but little changed. The company declined, and after al-Gammal's death in 1982 his wife, Waltraud Bitton, sold it to the Canadian firm Denson.

Al-Gammal had one son, Daniel, with Waltraud. He did not obtain Egyptian citizenship. As part of al-Gammal's cover, Egyptian records of his identity had been removed in the 1950s, leaving no paperwork to establish Daniel's claim. Waltraud and Daniel petitioned President Hosni Mubarak for an exception, which was denied for lack of official documentation. Daniel lived with European papers and no formal link to his father's country.

== Death and memoirs ==
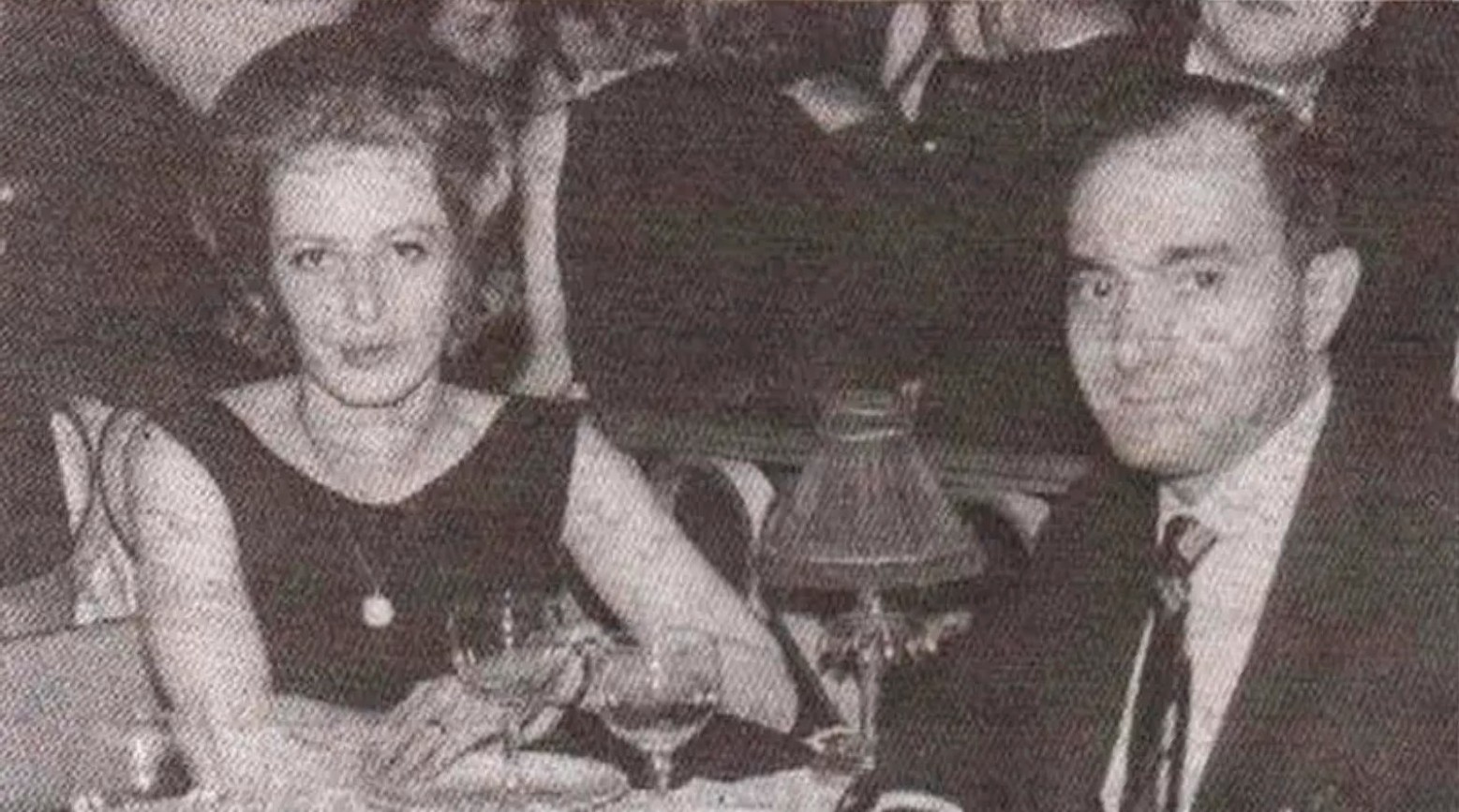
Colorized photo of Refaat al-Gammal with his wife Waltraud, Summer 1964.

Refaat al-Gammal was diagnosed with lung cancer in 1981 and began chemotherapy in October that year. He died on 30 January 1982 at age 54 in Götzenhain, near Darmstadt, close to Frankfurt, where he had lived with his family under the name Jacques Bitton since the mid-1960s. Before his death he asked his wife, Waltraud, not to have him buried in a Jewish cemetery, noting his Muslimfaith. She arranged interment in a public cemetery in Darmstadt without Jewish rites. Egyptian intelligence officers attended unofficially. At the graveside his nephew, Mohamed al-Gammal, recited al-Fātiḥa, which some attendees did not recognize. Afterward mourners gathered for a traditional German meal.

Al-Gammal did not disclose his identity to his wife before his death. In his final months he handwrote a memoir and left it with his lawyer in Germany. He told him to give it to Waltraud three years after he died. In 1985 she received a box containing the manuscript and a farewell letter in which he revealed his identity and explained his reasons for keeping it secret.

My beloved Waltraud…

By the time you read these words, a long time will have passed since I left you. You will never know the torment I endured, living a lie I was forced to carry.

Please, I beg you, don't judge me too harshly — for you know that I never loved anyone more than I loved you.

— Raafat Al-Haggan, in a letter delivered to his wife three years after his death, along with his memoirs, as per his final wish to his lawyer.

Waltraud learned of her husband's identity only after his death. In February 1982 she traveled to Egypt, visited his company in Cairo, and spoke with associates to verify the claims in his farewell letter. She later said she had forgiven him. She declared: "I would have married him all over again, even knowing the truth, despite the deception I lived through".

After details of the operation were declassified, al-Gammal's story was published widely. In 1987, Al-Ahram issued Eighteen Years of Deception Against Israel: The True Story of Refaat al-Gammal, prepared with his wife. It had the farewell letter, his notes, and her account. Also, in that year Egyptian state television began producing a dramatic series about his life.

== In popular culture ==
Raafat al-Haggan (Refaat al-Gammal) is remembered in Egypt and the Arab world as a celebrated intelligence operative. In 1988 the Egyptian service publicized his case as part of an effort to honor previously unnamed personnel, and some accounts state that a training facility adopted his codename. Egyptian media continue to mark his birth and death anniversaries. In Damietta, the alley where his family lived is still commonly called Harat al-Gammal. His story has circulated widely in print and on screen. A popular television series aired after declassification, several books appeared in multiple languages including a memoir by his wife Waltraud, and international newspapers reported on the case. Egyptian and Arab media hailed him as the "Legend of Egyptian Espionage". Israeli commentary remains divided on his role, but some former officials have described the long-running "Jacques Bitton" episode as a setback for Israeli counterintelligence because it allowed an operative to remain in place for years.

Raafat al-Haggan's story has been adapted in several Arab media works. The best-known is the three-season television series Raafat Al-Haggan (1988-1990), which drew a large audience and remains a reference point for regional espionage dramas. Other productions have echoed elements of his case like the Egyptian series Spy Wars (2009). Documentary programs have also revisited his career in relation to the Palestinian question. It featured interviews with officials who endorse parts of the televised account. In the 1990s, a documentary titled Raafat al-Haggan's Black Box used archival footage and photographs released by Egyptian intelligence.

Since the 1990s, fan groups, magazines, and online communities have circulated material on Raafat al-Haggan together with popular novels that dramatize his activities and social-media pages that share anecdotes and summaries of his case. His story has appeared in Israeli television as well, for example in the 2018 documentary series Spies in Tel Aviv, which briefly treated the affair from a Mossad perspective. In Egyptian colloquial speech, his name is sometimes used jokingly for someone who seems unusually shrewd or covert. On 4 February 1987, the writer Saleh Morsi described how he came to tell the story: after a chance meeting with a young Egyptian intelligence officer who urged him to read a case summary, he consulted Mohsen Moqtamas (ʿAbd al-Muḥsin Fāʾiq), who declined to reveal further identifying details, and then met ʿAbd al-ʿAzīz al-Tūdī (who used the pseudonym ʿAzīz al-Jabbālī); over ten handwritten chapters totaling 208 pages, al-Tūdī outlined nearly two decades of operations.

== See also ==
- Gumaa AL-Shawan
- Heba Selim
- Ibrahim Shaheen and Inshirah Moussa
