= Heroes Fly to Her =

2008 novel by Amir Gutfreund

- Author: Amir Gutfreund
- Language: Hebrew
- Genre: Historical fiction
- Publisher: Kinneret Zmora-Bitan Dvir
- Publication date: 2008
- Publication place: Israel
- Pages: 667

Heroes Fly to Her is the fourth book by Amir Gutfreund. The book was published in 2008.

The book is a broad-ranging novel that describes the relationships of five childhood friends, from their Israeli childhood in the period after the Six-Day War to the assassination of Prime Minister Yitzchak Rabin in 1995, when they are approaching their 40th birthday. Most of the novel takes place in a housing estate that is part of a workers' neighborhood in Haifa. At the center of the novel is the character of Arik, the narrator, and around him a love story slowly weaves. At the same time, the novel describes the residents of the housing estate - their characters, their relationships with each other, and the atmosphere that prevails in the housing estate. The novel constantly refers to the national events that occur in the background in parallel with the story of the five childhood friends from the housing estate: wars, politics, soccer, (Note: The hero of the story is a fan of the Hapoel Haifa football club, a recurring theme in the book) and the social and cultural changes that Israel experienced in those years. The book was translated into French in 2015, and in 2010, the film Once Upon a Time directed by Avi Nesher, based on the book, was released, and in 2018, the television series Heroes Fly to Her was released, loosely based on the last part of the book.

Upon its release, the book was a commercial success. After the release of the television series of the same name in 2018, there was a renewed increase in sales of the book.

== Plot ==
The book opens on the day the IDF embarked on the Battle of Karameh (March 1968), which the narrator, Arik (11 years old at the time), remembers as the day the new boy, Yoram, arrived at the block. Yoram stands out as a natural leader and forms a group of five friends: Yoram, Benny, Gideon, Zion, and Arik. At the age of 14, Arik discovers that he has become a handsome boy who is interested in women and is attracted to them, a trait that accompanies him throughout the book. At the same time, he accidentally introduces his father to his childhood friend, the Haredi matchmaker Yankela Braid, who was the only one of his family to survive the Holocaust. Braid hires Arik's services as an undercover agent looking for matchmaking candidates. He works this side job until the age of 18, during which he becomes acquainted with the world of prostitution and learns to fabricate lies with expertise.

The early days of the 1982 Lebanon War, in which the five friends are involved as young reservists, each in his own way, are a fault line in their lives, which affects them further down the road. One of them is killed and two of the others, including Arik, develop different types of post-traumatic stress disorder (PTSD). Arik starts and stops studying at several universities, changes occupations as he is dragged along by Yoram's opportunistic initiatives and changes new friends and lovers frequently. All this, while he continues to maintain close contact with the residents of the housing estate and especially with the family of his friend, Benny, which includes Benny's younger sister, Michal.

When Arik and his friends are already 38 years old, and the ties between them have effectively been severed as each of them has turned in a different direction in their lives, they reunite once again and fly to Chicago, United States, with the aim of rescuing Michal from the cult she has joined. The book ends when Arik returns on a flight from Chicago. As he approaches the shores of Israel on November 4, 1995, he wonders to himself whether the Peace Rally at Kings of Israel Square, in which Yitzhak Rabin is speaking, has already ended.

== Reviews ==
Unlike Amir Gutfreund's previous books, which were critically acclaimed and won literary awards, some critics were disappointed with Heroes Fly to Her. Amichai Shalev, the literary critic for ynet, divides the book into two parts, with the dividing line being the Lebanon War. About the first part, he says: "In the first part of the novel, we move through a routine, heartbreaking coming-of-age story, full of small and large dramas, but we still have the feeling that the author tried to surround us with something big, national, and we still don't know what it is," and about the second part, he writes: "In the second part, most of the supporting characters are pushed aside, they become a kind of necessary scenery, nothing more, and we begin to feel, know, and love Arik himself more." He concludes by saying that this is the author's most impressive and pretentious book, but regrets the lack of sharp statements and Gutfreund's preference to remain in the mainstream.

The critic Eric Glassner is much more emphatic. He defines the book as "disgraceful in its contempt for its readers." He claims that "the National's cover is in particular forced and devoid of content. Gutfreund simply juxtaposes seminal events in Israeli history with seminal events in the lives of the characters and rubs his hands together with pleasure: "Here is a 'canonical' work!" He adds and calls the book "a work of fake and used nostalgia, lingering at the stations of the sticky Israeli nostalgia clichés: Eurovision again, "Maccabi" again, Entebbe again." Glassner acknowledges Gottfreund's talent and sees him as "someone who has previously succeeded in presenting the Zionist worldview as the heartbreaking hope of downtrodden people, an innocent, non-predatory, legitimate utopia," but concludes his criticism by stating that it is "a whimsical novel written without inspiration or desire."

The literary critic of Haaretz, Omri Herzog, is no less emphatic. He criticizes the author for creating flat and clichéd characters that fit the stereotypes accepted in Israeli society. He states that the unifying line between all the characters and anecdotes that appear in the book is the deep contempt and even hatred for any form of difference from the consensus. He adds and writes: "And here, in the last part the book suddenly turns into a feverish action novel, which stormily celebrates the rehabilitation of the damaged male society...which aims to save a damsel in distress (who does not know that she is in distress)", but goes on to say that "it would take more than a daring military operation to restore my faith in Gottfreund's writing." He concludes his criticism by defining the novel as a lost cause and writes: "The loss of the way is expressed in the shuffling in place - a monotonous shuffling, which continues for 667 long pages.

In contrast, Tzur Erlich, in his article in Makor Rishon, also sees positive points in the book. He writes: "Gotfreund is a funny man with imagination and inventiveness, and thus he rolls the reader across the 667 pages of the book (Note: Erlich provides the numerology value for the number תרס"ז) from anecdote to anecdote and from brilliance to brilliance." He adds, "Gotfreund refreshes the literary landscape familiar to us, and expresses a Zionist, pro-Israeli point of view. He does not get entangled in unnecessary complexities in his attitude towards terrorism, refuses to ignore Arab aggression, and even tells the average reader a few things about it." But he also sees weaknesses in the book: "All of this is enough to create a fun and entertaining, exciting and immersive book, but it does not say anything new about Israeli society" and "the chain of stories and cartoons covers up the lack of a real coherent statement." He concludes: "Perhaps in this book you can't see the forest for the trees, but the trees are beautiful."
