= Ibrahim Shaheen and Inshirah Moussa =

Palestinian and Egyptian couple who were Israeli spies

Ibrahim Shaheen (Arabic: إبراهيم شاهين; 1929-1974) and Inshirah Moussa (Arabic: إنشراح موسى; 1937 – 24 November 2021) were an Egyptian married couple who worked for the Israeli intelligence service Mossad from June 1967 until their arrest in 1974. The couple provided Israel with the intelligence that led to the assassination of Chief of Staff of the Egyptian Armed Forces Abdul Munim Riad on 9 March 1969 while he was on an official visit to a position near the Bar Lev Line.

Ibrahim Shaheen, originally a low-level civil servant of Palestinian origin residing in El Arish, was demoted from his position due to disciplinary issues and faced financial hardships. Following the Israeli invasion of the Sinai Peninsula in June 1967, Shaheen approached the Israeli military authorities in the region to request a travel permit to return to Egypt, where his children resided, and sought assistance for his dire financial situation exacerbated by the ongoing war. In return for financial compensation, Shaheen agreed to provide intelligence to Israel, initially receiving US$70 per month, a sum that eventually increased to US$2,500 monthly. From 1967 to 1974, Shaheen and his spouse operated a home appliances store in Egypt, living comfortably and traveling often both domestically and internationally under assumed identities and with Israeli passports, which facilitated the concealment of their international movements.

== Arrest ==
Ibrahim Shaheen was discovered by Egyptian Intelligence on August 4, 1974, following a tip-off from the Soviets, after the signal from his transmitter was traced to his residence. He was arrested the next day, while his wife, Inshirah, was away in Israel via Italy. Inshirah was detained upon her return to Cairo on August 24, 1974, immediately after disembarking from a taxi at the airport. The couple was subsequently tried and sentenced to death by hanging. Ibrahim Shaheen was executed in Egypt in 1977. Following an appeal from Israeli authorities during his visit to Jerusalem in November 1977, President Anwar Sadat pardoned Inshirah and her three children, facilitating their relocation to Israel. Inshirah converted to Judaism along with her three children. She adopted the name Dina Ben David, and continued to live in Israel until her death on 24 November 2021, in Tel Aviv, where her funeral was conducted according to Jewish customs. Their story received extensive coverage in the Israeli media towards the end of the 1980s.

== Popular culture ==
In 1977, Inshirah Moussa made her first television appearance following her release from prison, during an interviewed by Egyptian anchor Samir Sabri. In 1995, the couple were the subject of an Egyptian 24-episode TV series called Arabic: السقوط في بئر سبع, romanized: as-Suqut fi Bi'r Sab', lit. 'Falling in Beersheba'. Saeed Saleh and Isaad Younis portrayed the couple.

== See also ==
- Refaat Al-Gammal
- Gumaa Al-Shawan
- Heba Selim
