= Heba Selim =

Egyptian spy (born 1947)

- هبة عبد الرحمن سليم عامر
- Born: 1947; Asyut, Egypt
- Died: 1974 (aged 26–27); Egypt
- Occupation: Spy for Mossad
- Known for: Espionage against Egypt for Israel
- Criminal charge: High treason
- Criminal penalty: Death
- Criminal status: Executed by hanging
- Spouse: Farouk Al-Fikki

Heba Selim (Arabic: هبة عبد الرحمن سليم عامر; 1947-1974) was an Egyptian woman who worked as a spy for Mossad along with her fiancé Farouk Al-Fikki.

== Biography ==
Heba Selim was born in Asyut Governorate in Upper Egypt. She grew up in the upper-class Cairo suburb Mohandessin. As a student in faculty of arts, she majored in French at Ain Shams University. One of her instructors, a French man, offered her the opportunity of furthering her studies in at the Sorbonne in Paris. She stayed with an Egyptian family in Paris and was a regular guest at the Egyptian ambassador's home. In a 2010 Egyptian TV program, the ambassador, Fakhry Othman, described her as attractive, cheerful, bright, and patriotic. He did note, however, that she struggled financially as she could not find work in the Egyptian Embassy in Paris.

In Paris, she met a Jewish colleague of Polish descent who invited her to a party with other Jewish friends, and convinced her of Israeli aspirations for peace, which was also an ambition of hers. After her recruitment by the Mossad, she married Farouk El Fikki, an Egyptian army engineer officer, and gathered information - through him - about the locations of anti-aircraft batteries, including the 2K12 Kub. He later became aware of and willingly participated in her spying activities. During the Yom Kippur War, intelligence provided by Selim enabled Israel to score many accurate hits against Egyptian forces, destroying many anti-aircraft missile bases at a heavy cost of men and material to Egypt.

The Israeli strikes were so accurate that the Egyptians became convinced insider informants must be involved. Eventually her husband was discovered and faced a certain death sentence. The Egyptians, however, decided to use him as a double agent for some time. Also, by not arresting him, he gave Heba Selim the impression that their spying was not compromised.

== Trial and execution ==
Heba was arrested after Egyptian intelligence lured her to Tripoli, Libya on the pretext that her father had been hospitalized there, and arrested her upon arrival, transferring her to an Egyptian aircraft to return her to Egypt, with the cooperation of Libyan authorities. The Egyptian ambassador to France, whose home she had often visited, had been instrumental in the plan. Her husband was also arrested. Selim was tried for high treason while he was court-martialled. They were both convicted and sentenced to death. After exhausting all appeals, including a petition for clemency by U.S. Secretary of State Henry Kissinger to President Anwar Sadat that was denied, Heba was executed by hanging as prescribed by law for civilian convicts, while El Fikki was executed by firing squad since he was a commissioned army officer at the time of conviction, as prescribed by Egyptian military law.

== Cultural depictions ==
Heba Selim is the basis of the Egyptian film Al sood ila al haweyah (Climbing to the abyss). One of the most famous lines in Egyptian cinema history is said at the end of the movie as Abla (Heba Selim's name in the movie), portrayed by Madiha Kamel, is flown to Egypt after her capture in Libya. As the plane approaches Cairo airport, her escorting intelligence officer points at the pyramids and the Nile and then, in a most condemning tone he says "we heya dee Masr ya abla" (and this is Egypt Abla).

== See also ==
- Refaat Al-Gammal
- Gumaa AL-Shawan
- Ibrahim Shaheen and Inshirah Moussa
- Espionage
