= The Tower (2018 film) =

- Film poster
- Norwegian: Tårnet
- Directed by: Mats Grorud
- Written by: Mats Grorud
- Produced by: Patrice Nezan; Laurent Versini; Frode Sobstad; Annika Hellström
- Starring: Pauline Ziade; Saïd Amadis; Aïssa Maïga; Mohammad Bakri; Saleh Bakri; Bouraouïa Marzouk; Mouna Hawa; Makram Khoury; Slimane Dazi; Darina Al Joundi; Lina Soualem; Raymond Hosni; Omar Yami
- Cinematography: Rui Tenreiro; Sara Sponga; Nadine Buss
- Edited by: Silje Nordseth; Karstein Meinich
- Music by: Nathanaël Bergese
- Production companies: Tenk.tv; Les Contes Modernes; Cinenic Film
- Distributed by: MAD Solutions
- Release date: June 2018 (Annecy)
- Running time: 74 minutes
- Countries: Norway; France; Sweden
- Languages: English; Arabic; Norwegian; Swedish; French

The Tower (Norwegian: Tårnet) is a Norwegian animated feature film written and directed by Mats Grorud. The film screened at the Cairo International Film Festival, Annecy International Animated Film Festival, Busan International Film Festival, Thessaloniki International Film Festival, Sevilla Film Festival and Rome Film Festival.

== Plot ==
Wardi, an 11-year-old Palestinian girl, lives with her family in a Lebanese refugee camp. She learns about her family's history through stories told by three previous generations of refugees.

== Production ==
Mad solutions is the national distributors and Jour2fête is also a distributor of the film in France.

== Awards ==
Award	Category	Recipient(s) and nominee(s)	Result	Ref.
Chicago International Children's Film Festival	Liv Ullmann Peace Prize	Mats Grorud	Won	
Chicago International Children's Film Festival	Best Animated Feature	The Tower	Won	
MONSTRA Lisbon Animated Film Festival	Best Soundtrack	The Tower	Won	
MONSTRA Lisbon Animated Film Festival	Jury Special Award	The Tower	Won	
