= Mats Grorud =

Norwegian director and animator (born 1976)

- Born: 1 August 1976 (age 50); Tønsberg, Norway
- Education: Volda University College
- Occupations: Director, Screenwriter, Animator
- Years active: 2005–present

Mats Grorud (born 1 August 1976) is a Norwegian director and animator. He is best known for his work on the films The Tower, Min Bestemor Beijing and more.

== Life and career ==
Mats was born and raised in Tønsberg, Norway. He studied animation at the Volda University College. His animated short film Min Bestemor Beijing (My Grandmother Beijing) screened at Lübeck Nordic Film Days In 2018, his debut animated feature film The Tower premiered in the Annecy International Animated Film Festival

== Filmography ==
Year	Film	Writer	Director	Notes
2018	The Tower	✓	✓	Feature Film
2010	Santa Klaus	✓	✓	Short Film
2008	Min Bestemor Beijing	✓	✓	Short Film

== Awards and nominations ==
Year	Result	Award	Category	Work
2010	Won	Nordisk Panorama Film Festival	Best Animation	Min Bestemor Beijing
2010	Nominated	Warsaw International Film Festival	Best Short	Min Bestemor Beijing
2018	Won	Chicago International Children's Film Festival	Liv Ullmann Peace Prize	The Tower
