= Gumaa Al-Shawan =

Egyptian spy/double agent

Gumaa Al-Shawan (né Ahmed Al-Hawan; 1 July 1937 – 1 November 2011) was an Egyptian spy who worked for the Israeli Mossad from 1967 until 1973. He provided the Israelis with false military information with the help of the Egyptian General Intelligence Directorate.

== Biography ==
Ahmed Al-Hawan was born and raised in Suez. He and his family left after Israel occupied the Sinai Peninsula during the 1967 War. His wife Fatima reportedly lost her eyesight due to an Israeli air strike and they moved to Cairo and joined the Egyptian intelligence and he got the highest rank as a general in the Egyptian intelligence .

== Mossad ==
When Al-Hawan couldn't find a job in Cairo, he traveled to Greece to earn his living on a ship. He met a woman with whom he fell in love, but who was reportedly a Mossad agent and who convinced him to work at her father's company. There he met an undercover Mossad agent posing as a Syrian who asked Al-Hawan to return to Egypt and gather information regarding the ships that were sailing in the Egyptian Suez Canal.

== Egyptian Intelligence ==
Al-Hawan opened a grocery store and began to collect information for his bosses but he soon developed some doubts about their intentions. He went to the headquarters of the General Intelligence Service (GIS) and met with Rais Zakariya (General Mohammed Abdul Salam Al-Mahgoub) whom he informed about his doubts about the people he worked with. The GIS recruited and gave him a rank of sergeant, to provide the Israelis with false information for the next eleven years.

The Mossad, then still convinced that Al-Hawan is a valuable asset, and after subjecting him to a polygraph test which he passed, provided him with the most advanced transmitting device at the time, believed to be a burst transmitter. Once in Egypt, and at the first scheduled transmission window, Al-Hawan sent a message using the device which reportedly read: "From Egyptian intelligence to Mossad, we thank you for your cooperation over the last eleven years with our man, Ahmed Al-Hawan, and we look forward to other operations."

== Retirement ==
In January 1976, while he was collecting information for the Mossad under the supervision of Egyptian intelligence, an army vehicle hit Al-Shawan causing him a major injury in his right leg that he says could have easily been cured, had the doctors been more competent. The injury was followed by damage to the right eye as a result of using invisible ink. He requested retirement which was approved by President Sadat in December 1977 and he was requested to join again the Egyptian intelligence as a general of national security Counslatant in 1992 till he passed away.

== Popular culture ==
His story was made into a drama series titled Tears in Insolent Eyes دموع في عيون وقحة starring Adel Emam as Gumaa Al-Shawan.

== Death ==
Gumaa Al-Shawan died on 1 November 2011 at the age of 74 after suffering from an unknown illness. For several months he was treated at a medical facility of the armed forces.

== See also ==
- Refaat Al-Gammal
- Heba Selim
- Ibrahim Shaheen and Inshirah Moussa
