= Makram Khoury =

Palestinian-Arab actor

- مكرم يعقوب خوري
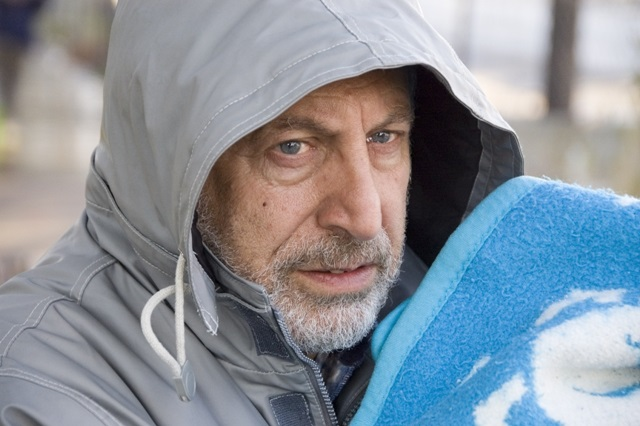
- Makram Khoury in the movie Petah Tikva By Tom Shoval.
- Born: Makram Jamil Khoury; 30 May 1945 (age 81); Jerusalem, British Mandate of Palestine
- Occupations: Actor, director
- Years active: 1970–present
- Spouse: Wadia Khoury (m. 1976)

Makram Jamil Khoury (Arabic: مكرم يعقوب خوري, Hebrew: מכרם חורי; born 30 May 1945) is a Palestinian-Arab actor. He was the youngest artist and the first Arab to win the Israel Prize, the highest civic honor in Israel.

== Biography ==
Makram J. Khoury was born into a Palestinian-Christian family, in the al-Sheikh Jarrah section of Jerusalem to his father, who was a judge, and his mother, a teacher. The Khoury family fled to Lebanon during 1948 Arab-Israeli War. A year later, they returned to what had become the new State of Israel. The family took up residence in the port city of Acre, near Haifa. Educated there and in the nearby village of Kufr Yasif, Khoury finished high school in 1963. He then entered the Hebrew University of Jerusalem but later dropped out and pursued a career as an actor.

His eldest daughter, Clara Khoury, is also an actress in Israel. She appeared in three films that garnered international attention: Rana's Wedding (2002), The Syrian Bride (she played the daughter of the character played by Makram) (2004) and Lipstikka (2011). His son Jameel Khoury is also an actor, and appeared in Ridley Scott's film Body of Lies (2008).

== Acting career ==
Khoury trained in Israel. In 1970-1973 he studied at the Mountview Academy of Theatre Arts in London, England. He later became involved with the Cameri Theater in Tel Aviv and the Haifa Municipal Theater, continuing as a member of the latter for twenty years.

Khoury returned to Haifa following a year-long tour playing Tierno Bokar in Peter Brook's 11 and 12.

== Filmography ==
=== Film ===
- 1979: Imi Hageneralit (by Joel Silberg)
- 1982: Mitahat La'af (by Jacob Goldwasser) - Detective chief inspector Ben-Shooshan
- 1983: Michel Ezra Safra U'vanav (TV Mini-Series, by Nissim Dayan) - Michel
- 1984: Kasach (by Haim Gil)
- 1985: Gesher Tzar Me'od (by Nissim Dayan)
- 1986: Hiuch HaGdi (by Shimon Dotan) - Col. Moshe Katzman
- 1987: Wedding in Galilee - The governor
- 1989: Esh Tzolevet (by Gideon Ganani) - Anton
- 1990: Torn Apart - Mahmoud Malek
- 1990: Le Cantique des Pierres (by Michel Khleifi)
- 1992: Lahav Hatzui (by Amos Kollek) - Ahmed Shafik
- 1994: Les Patriotes (by Eric Rochant) - Barak
- 1995: The Tale of the Three Lost Jewels (by Michel Khleifi) - Abu Iman
- 1997: Shvil Hahalav (by Ali Nasser) - Mukhtar
- 2001: The Body (by Jonas McCord) - Nasir Hamid
- 2003: Ha-Mangalistim (by Yossi (Joseph) Madmoni, David Ofek) - Ezra
- 2004: The Syrian Bride (by Eran Riklis) - Hammed
- 2005: Free Zone (by Amos Gitai) - Samir aka "The American"
- 2005: Munich (by Steven Spielberg) - Wael Zwaiter
- 2006: Forgiveness (by Udi Aloni) - Dr. Isaac Shemesh
- 2006: Djihad! (TV Movie) - Médecin hôpital
- 2008: Etz Limon (by Eran Riklis) - Abu Kamal
- 2009: Italians (by Giovanni Veronesi) - Hamed (first segment)
- 2009: Carmel (by Amos Gitai)
- 2010: Miral (by Julian Schnabel) - Governor Khatib
- 2012: The Inheritance (by Hiam Abbass) - Abu Majd
- 2013: Complicit (TV Movie, by Niall MacCormick) - Colonel Hazem Ashraf
- 2013: Farewell Baghdad - Nouri El Saeed
- 2013: Sukaryot - Salach
- 2013: The Physician - Imam
- 2014: Magic Men - Avraham Kofinas
- 2014: Desert Dancer (by Richard Raymond) - Mehdi
- 2014: The Cut - Omar Nasreddin
- 2014: Atlit - Mafous
- 2015: A Tale of Love and Darkness (by Natalie Portman) - Al Hilwani
- 2015: Wounded Land
- 2015: Abulele by Jonathan Geva - Hani
- 2016: Everything is Broken up and Dances - Shlomi
- 2017: Unlocked - Yazid Khaleel
- 2017: Wajib
- 2018: The Tower
- 2018: Le'at Yoter - Voice Over
- 2019: Spider in the Web - Nader
- 2020: Laila in Haifa
- 2024: The Master and Margarita - Caiaphas

=== Theater ===
Year	Title	Role	Notes
2010	11 and 12	Tierno Bokar	
2015	The Merchant of Venice	Shylock	Performed in the Royal Shakespeare Company

=== Television ===
Year	Title	Role	Notes
2004	The West Wing	Chairman Nizar Farad	6 episodes
2008	House of Saddam	Tariq Aziz	
2014	Zaguri Imperia	Superintendent Hazan	
2015	Homeland	Samir Khalil	2 episodes
2020	Messiah	Mullah Omar	3 episodes
2025	Fireflies	Hezi	

== Awards and recognition ==
- 2013: Ophir Award, Best Leading Actor in Magic Men

== See also ==
- List of Israel Prize recipients
- Palestinian Christians
