= Prisoners of War (TV series) =

Israeli television series

- Hebrew: חטופים
- Genre: Psychological thriller; Drama
- Created by: Gideon Raff
- Written by: Gideon Raff
- Directed by: Gideon Raff
- Starring: Yoram Toledano; Ishai Golan; Assi Cohen; Yael Eitan; Mili Avital; Yael Abecassis; Adi Ezroni
- Country of origin: Israel
- Original languages: Hebrew; Arabic
- No. of seasons: 2
- No. of episodes: 24

Production
- Executive producers: Gideon Raff; Liat Benasuly
- Producer: Liat Benasuly
- Cinematography: Itai Ne'eman
- Running time: 45–60 minutes
- Production company: Keshet Media Group

Original release
- Network: Channel 2
- Release: 6 March 2010 – 25 December 2012

Related
- Homeland; P.O.W. – Bandi Yuddh Ke

Prisoners of War (Hebrew: חטופים, romanized: Hatufim / Khatufim, lit. 'Hostages') is an Israeli television drama series created by Israeli director, screenwriter and producer Gideon Raff and made by Keshet. The first season aired on Israel's Channel 2 from March to May 2010, and the second season from October to December 2012. In 2013, Raff stated that a third season was planned, but in 2015, he said that a third season did not look likely. In 2010, the series won the Israeli Academy Award for Television for Best Drama Series.

The programme was acquired by 20th Century Fox Television before it aired in Israel, and was adapted into the eight-season series Homeland for Showtime in the United States from 2011 to 2020. In India, it was adapted as the 110-episode television series P.O.W. - Bandi Yuddh Ke by Nikhil Advani in 2016 and 2017, with Raff consulting for the series. In Russia, it was adapted into the TV series Rodina in 2015.

== Plot ==
The series, set in 2008, depicts three Israeli soldiers who were captured 17 years previously while on a secret mission with their unit in Lebanon and two of them have returned from their captivity in Syria.

=== Season 1 ===
The story begins with the soldiers' return home after years of negotiations for their freedom. Nimrod Klein and Uri Zach return alive, along with the remains of Amiel Ben-Horin.

The series explores the reintegration of Nimrod and Uri into a society which has made them national icons, and into an interrupted family life, while working through the trauma of having been held captive and tortured. They must deal with partners who waited or moved on, children who have grown up without them, and parents who have died.

They also have to undergo psychiatric evaluations and military debriefings. When a military psychiatrist finds discrepancies in their stories, an investigation is launched to discover what they are hiding.

=== Season 2 ===
After flashbacks to events at a school in Metula in 1990, and to the period shortly after Nimrod and Uri's release, the second season rejoins the story a few days after the events at the end of the first season.

Initially disagreeing on what to do with their discovery that Amiel may still be alive, Nimrod and Uri take the information to Haim and Iris, who start to pursue their own (unofficial) investigation into what happened to Amiel—with unanticipated consequences.

Alongside this, the series continues to follow Nimrod and Uri (and the soldiers' families) as they pick up the pieces of their lives post-release. It also depicts Amiel for the first time as a living character—rather than in the visions experienced by Amiel's younger sister, Yael—and follows his new life as Yusuf, a Muslim, in Syria.

== Cast and characters ==
=== Season 1 ===
- Yoram Toledano as Nimrod Klein, a prisoner of war, and a brave, witty and intelligent man. He has difficulty readjusting to life with his wife and two children.
  - Yael Abecassis as Talia Klein, Nimrod's wife. She campaigned tirelessly for her husband's release. Since his return, she has trouble relating to him, and she finds that her life no longer has a clear purpose.
  - Yael Eitan as Dana, Nimrod's rebellious daughter, who was two years old when her father was captured.
  - Guy Selnik as Hatzav, Nimrod's teenage son, who was born after his father was taken captive.
- Ishai Golan as Uri Zach, a shy and timid prisoner of war. He is very close to Nimrod. During Uri's captivity, his fiancée married his brother, and they had a son.
  - Mili Avital as Nurit Halevi-Zach, Uri's former fiancée. After mourning Uri's capture and becoming convinced that he was dead, she eventually grew close to and married his brother Yaki. She feels intense guilt after Uri's return.
  - Mickey Leon as Yaakov "Yaki" Zach, Uri's brother and Nurit's husband. He is concerned about the effect Uri's return might have on his marriage.
  - Adam Kenneth as Asaf, son of Yaki and Nurit.
  - Shmuel Shilo as Joseph "Yoske" Zach, Uri and Yaki's elderly father and a widower.
- Assi Cohen as Amiel Ben-Horin, a prisoner of war believed to have been killed during his captivity under mysterious circumstances.
  - Adi Ezroni as Yael Ben-Horin, Amiel's younger sister. She finds it impossible to deal with his death, and she begins to see him in visions.
- Nevo Kimchi as Ilan Feldman, an IDF liaison to the families of killed, captured and injured soldiers.
- Gal Zaid as Haim Cohen, an IDF psychiatrist. He leads the investigation of Nimrod and Uri, convinced that they are hiding something.
- Sendi Bar as Iris, an IDF operative working with Haim.
- Aki Avni as Ofer, owner of an advertising agency and a friend of Nimrod who served with him in the IDF.
- Dalik Volonitz as Dr Shmuel Ostrovsky, Dana's therapist.
- Doron Amit as Ehud, son of Dr Ostrovsky.
- Salim Daw as Jamal Agrabiya, leader of the cell that captured and imprisoned Nimrod, Uri and Amiel.
- Abdallah El Akal as young Ismail, son of Jamal.
- Said Dasuki as teenage Ismail.

=== Season 2 (additional characters) ===
- Hadar Ratzon-Rotem as Leila, wife of Yusuf (Amiel).
- Makram Khoury as Sheikh Qasab, father of Leila, and founder of the organisation responsible for the kidnapping of Nimrod, Uri and Amiel.
- Yousef Sweid as Abdullah bin Rashid, serving a prison sentence in Israel for a terrorist attack but released as part of the prisoner exchange that freed Nimrod and Uri.
- Yonatan Uziel as Yinon "Noni" Meiri, whose father was murdered by Abdullah when Noni was a child.
- Shimon Mimran as Dr Ze'ev Kaplan, an IDF psychologist.
- Sinai Peter as Atar Shorer, a former Mossad chief who was killed in an accident around the time of Nimrod and Uri's release.
- Boaz Konforty as Oren, a friend of Nimrod and a member of Nimrod and Uri's reserve unit.

== Production ==
Filming commenced on the first season of Hatufim in August 2009. First season episodes had a budget of $200,000 each.

The second season of Hatufim was filmed between May and October 2011. It was originally due to be broadcast in Israel from December 2011 but the premiere was put back to June 2012 and then October 2012 due to the state of the local advertising market.

Though Gideon Raff had stated, in 2013, that he intended to write a third season of Hatufim, but in 2015 it was announced that the plans for season three had been frozen, with Raff stating that his ongoing work with other projects meant that "There's no third season in sight".

== Reception ==
At the time of broadcast, the first season of Hatufim was Israel's highest-rated TV drama of all time. It also achieved critical acclaim and was awarded Best Drama Series of 2010 by the Israeli Academy of Film and Television. For their work on the show, Gideon Raff won Best Directing for a Drama Series, Ishai Golan won Best Actor in a Drama Series, and Yael Abecassis won Best Actress in a Drama Series.

The series was not without controversy. It was criticized by family members of soldiers held prisoner, including Miriam Groff, mother of one of the men released in the Jibril Agreement. She suggested that the series might encourage the kidnapping of soldiers.

Viewing figures for the second season of Hatufim were even higher than for the first, with an average audience share of 40% (rising to 47.9% for the final episode) making it the highest-rated drama in Israel in 2012. Online viewing reached 3 million.

At the 2013 Seoul International Drama Awards, Hatufim (season 2) was awarded the festival's Grand Prize, out of a total of 225 entries from 48 countries. Other series nominated included Homeland (season 2) and House (season 8).

At the 2013 Israeli Academy Television Awards, season 2 of Hatufim was nominated in 9 categories, including (for Drama Series) Best Series, Best Directing (Gideon Raff), Best Screenplay (Gideon Raff) and Best Actor (Assi Cohen).

In December 2009, three months before Hatufim premiered in Israel, it was reported that the rights to develop an American version of the series had been sold to 20th Century Fox Television. It was sold on the strength of the script alone, before the series had even begun shooting. The result was the series Homeland, developed in cooperation with Raff and broadcast on cable channel Showtime.

Following on from the success of Hatufim in Israel, and the worldwide success of Homeland, Keshet has sold the original series (in Hebrew with subtitles) in a number of territories internationally, including Australia, Brazil, Canada, India, the United States and several European countries. The rights to produce local versions of the series have been sold in Russia (due to start filming in March 2014), Colombia and Mexico Turkey and South Korea. A version with dubbing of the Hebrew dialogue, but undertitles for the Arabic dialogue, has been produced for the German market and broadcast by ARTE.

Author Stephen King included Hatufim (season 1) at number 8 in his top 10 TV shows of 2012.

The New York Times placed Hatufim (season 2) at number 2 in its top 12 TV shows of 2013, and in 2020 ranked it as the best show of the 2010s.

== Episodes ==
=== Season 1 (2010) ===
No. overall	No. in season	Title	Directed by	Written by	Original release date
1	1	"Homecoming" (original Hebrew title: השיבה, "The Return")	Gideon Raff	Gideon Raff	6 March 2010
2	2	"The Facility, Part 1"	Gideon Raff	Gideon Raff	13 March 2010
3	3	"The Facility, Part 2"	Gideon Raff	Gideon Raff	20 March 2010
4	4	"Letters from Mom"	Gideon Raff	Gideon Raff	27 March 2010
5	5	"Keep Your Soul"	Gideon Raff	Gideon Raff	10 April 2010
6	6	"The Journal"	Gideon Raff	Gideon Raff	17 April 2010
7	7	"A Picture from Hell" (original Hebrew title: תמונה מהשבי, "A Picture from Captivity")	Gideon Raff	Gideon Raff	24 April 2010
8	8	"Family Portrait" (original Hebrew title: 'ושבו מצרימה...', "'...And They Return to Egypt'")	Gideon Raff	Gideon Raff	8 May 2010
9	9	"Awake at Night"	Gideon Raff	Gideon Raff	15 May 2010
10	10	"The Tape" (original Hebrew title: גילוי מצבה, "Unveiling of a Monument")	Gideon Raff	Gideon Raff	22 May 2010

=== Season 2 (2012) ===
No. overall	No. in season	Title	Directed by	Written by	Original release date
11	1	"First Grade" (original Hebrew title: להתראות מתוק, "Goodbye, Sweetie")	Gideon Raff	Gideon Raff	15 October 2012
12	2	"Birthday" (original Hebrew title: חג לה שמח, "Happy Birthday")	Gideon Raff	Gideon Raff	16 October 2012
13	3	"Little Lies"	Gideon Raff	Gideon Raff	22 October 2012
14	4	"Blue"	Gideon Raff	Gideon Raff	23 October 2012
15	5	"A Ghost from the Past" (original Hebrew title: פקידה פלוגתית, "Platoon Secretary")	Gideon Raff	Gideon Raff	29 October 2012
16	6	"The Song" (original Hebrew title: חופים, "Shores")	Gideon Raff	Gideon Raff	5 November 2012
17	7	"The Picture"	Gideon Raff	Gideon Raff	12 November 2012
18	8	"The Double Agent" (original Hebrew title: מותו של סוכן, "Death of a Salesman")	Gideon Raff	Gideon Raff	26 November 2012
19	9	"Mika's Boyfriend"	Gideon Raff	Gideon Raff	3 December 2012
20	10	"The Notebook" (original Hebrew title: חלבה, "Halva")	Gideon Raff	Gideon Raff	10 December 2012
21	11	"Our Agent in Damascus" (original Hebrew title: האישה שלנו בדמשק, "Our Woman in Damascus")	Gideon Raff	Gideon Raff	17 December 2012
22	12	"The Kidnapping" (original Hebrew title: נוהל חניבעל, "The Hannibal Procedure")	Gideon Raff	Gideon Raff	18 December 2012
23	13	"Operation Judea" (original Hebrew title: מבצע יהודה, "Operation Judah")	Gideon Raff	Gideon Raff	24 December 2012
24	14	"Prisoners of War"	Gideon Raff	Gideon Raff	25 December 2012

== Songs ==
Season	Episode	Song title	Written by	Performed by	Album (year)	When featured in episode
1	2; 10	"I Have Come Home" (Hebrew: הנה באתי הביתה, romanized: Hine Bati Habaita)	Dana Berger & Itay Pearl	Dana Berger & Itay Pearl	I Have Come Home (2010)	Episode 2 – at the start, during Nimrod's early morning run. Episode 10 – during the end credits. (Although the song was released in 2010, it was not written specifically for the series.)
1	5	"Keep Your Soul – The Guard Song" (Hebrew: שמרי נפשך – שיר משמר, romanized: Shimri Nafshech – Shir Mishmar)	Nathan Alterman & Sasha Argov	Chava Alberstein	Let It Be (Hebrew: לו יהי, romanized: Lu Yehi) (1973)	After Amiel's funeral, while Yael's dogs are being walked.
1	10	"In A Dream" (Hebrew: בחלום, romanized: Bachalom)	Jaroslav Jakubovic & Michal Vered	Anat Atzmon	In A Dream (1989)	At the start, when Uri is listening to old cassette tapes, and later, in Nurit's kitchen.
2	1	"Goodbye, Sweetie" (Hebrew: להתראות מתוק, romanized: Lehitraot Matok)	Meir Goldberg & Leah Shabat	Nurit Galron	Goodbye, Sweetie (2000)	At the end, during the Nurit Galron concert.
2	6	"Shores (Are Sometimes)" (Hebrew: (חופים (הם לפעמים, romanized: Chofim (Hem Lifamim))	Natan Yonatan & Nachum Heiman	—N/a	—N/a	Hummed/sung by Abdullah at the end of prayers and while carrying out surveillance, and later by Yusuf (Amiel) in his bathroom.
2	12	"The Heart" (Hebrew: הלב, romanized: Halev)	Mirit Shem-Ur & Svika Pick	—N/a	—N/a	"Ivy" quotes lyrics from the song ("it's an autumn night and there are no stars") while on the radio to "Bird".
2	14	"The Song of the Land" (Hebrew: השיר על הארץ, romanized: Hashir Al Haaretz)	Joshua Sobol & Yoni Rechter	Nurit Galron	A Gentle Touch (Hebrew: נגיעה אחת רכה, romanized: Negia Achat Raka) (1984)	Towards the end, on the radio in Yael's living room.

== Broadcast ==
Hatufim in its original format (in Hebrew with subtitles) has been sold internationally for broadcast on network and pay television, for download via VOD, and for DVD release.

=== Season 1 ===
The first season (10 episodes) aired on Channel 2 in Israel from 6 March to 22 May 2010.

In the UK it was shown on Sky Arts from 10 May to 12 July 2012. It was Hulu's first foreign language exclusive series in the United States, with episodes released weekly from 14 July to 15 September 2012. In Australia it was broadcast from 19 January to 23 March 2013 on SBS. In Canada it was aired on Super Channel, two episodes at a time, from 10 July to 7 August 2013.

=== Season 2 ===
The second season (14 episodes) aired in Israel from 15 October to 25 December 2012. The majority of episodes were released a week in advance for online viewing (rental service) via mako VOD.

In the United States, episodes were released weekly from 28 May to 20 August 2013 on Hulu. In Canada, season 2 was shown on Super Channel immediately after the end of season 1, from 14 August to 25 September 2013 (two episodes at a time). In Australia it was broadcast on SBS from 2 October 2013 to 15 January 2014. Having initially said that it had no plans to show Season 2, Sky Arts aired it in the UK from 22 April to 22 July 2014.

== DVD releases ==
Season	Audio	Subtitles	Release dates			Episodes	Discs
Season	Audio	Subtitles	Region 1	Region 2	Region 4	Episodes	Discs
1	Hebrew	English	8 October 2013 (Canada); 8 July 2014 (United States)	16 July 2012	3 April 2013	10	3
1	Hebrew; French	French	—N/a	22 May 2013	—N/a	10	3
1	Hebrew; German	German	—N/a	8 August 2013	—N/a	10	3
2	Hebrew	English	19 August 2014 (Canada); 16 September 2014 (United States)	28 July 2014	4 December 2013	14	4
2	Hebrew; French	French	—N/a	5 November 2014	—N/a	14	5
2	Hebrew; German	German	—N/a	30 April 2015	—N/a	14	4
1 & 2	Hebrew	Hebrew; English	—N/a	20 March 2013	—N/a	24	7
1 & 2	Hebrew	English	—N/a	28 July 2014	—N/a	24	7
1 & 2	Hebrew; French	French	—N/a	5 November 2014	—N/a	24	8
