= Hostages (Israeli TV series) =

Israeli TV series

- Also known as: Bnei Aruba
- Genre: Drama; Thriller
- Created by: Rotem Shamir; Omri Givon
- Directed by: Rotem Shamir; Omri Givon
- Starring: Ayelet Zurer; Jonah Lotan; Dar Zuzovsky
- Country of origin: Israel
- Original language: Hebrew
- No. of series: 2
- No. of episodes: 22 (list of episodes)

Production
- Executive producer: Chaim Sharir
- Producer: Chaim Sharir
- Production location: Israel
- Running time: 45 minutes
- Production company: Yetzira Ivrit

Original release
- Network: Channel 10, Netflix
- Release: 13 October 2013 – 20 April 2016

Related
- Hostages (American TV series); Hostages (Indian TV series)

Hostages (Hebrew: בני ערובה, romanized: Bnei Aruba) is an Israeli drama television series that was first broadcast on Channel 10 in October 2013. The series was created by Rotem Shamir and Omri Givon and produced by Chaim Sharir.

The series originally aired on Channel 10 in Israel and has subsequently been broadcast, and later adapted, in several other countries.

== Synopsis ==
Four masked men break into the Danon family home and take the family hostage. The intruders demand that Yael (Ayelet Zurer), the family matriarch and a brilliant surgeon, kill the prime minister in what is meant to be a routine surgery. The operation is scheduled for the following day. If the prime minister does not die during the surgery, Yael's family will be killed.

== Cast ==
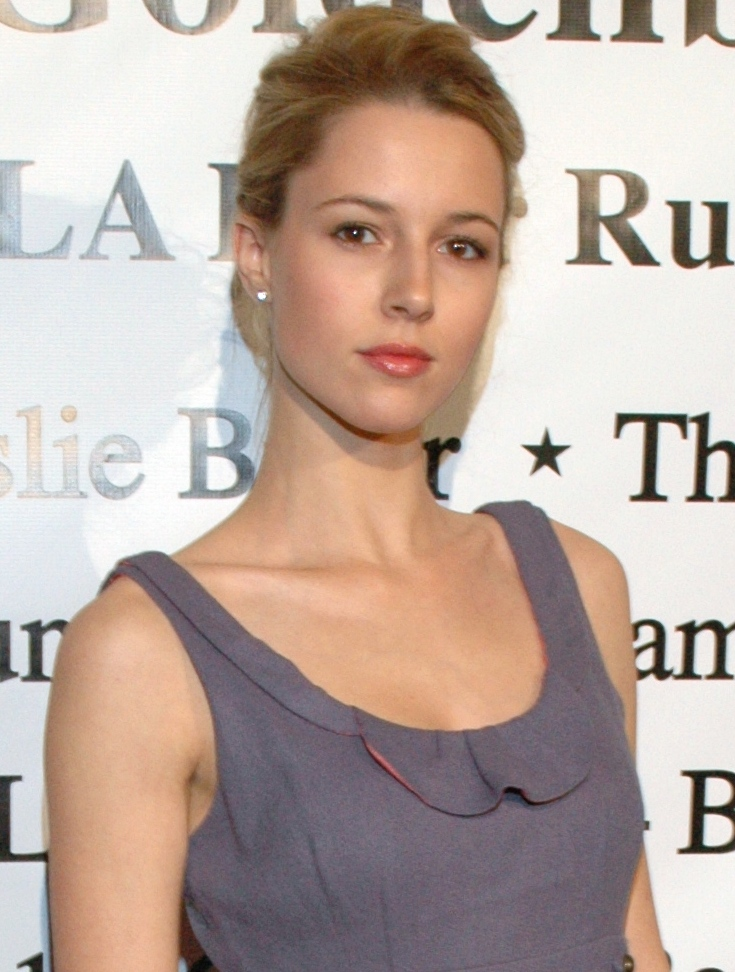
Alona Tal
- Jonah Lotan as Adam Rubin (season 1 - 2)
- Ayelet Zurer as Dr. Yael Danon (season 1)
- Tomer Kapon as Guy (season 1 - 2)
- Dar Zuzovsky as Noa Danon (season 1)
- Reymonde Amsalem as Orna (season 2)
- Alona Tal as Zohar (season 2)
- Itay Tiran as Ben (season 2)
- Kim Bodnia as Arthur (season 2)
- Soraya Torrens as Lydia Mendez (season 2)
- Yonatan Uziel as Boaz (season 2)
- Micha Celektar as Eyal Danon (season 1)
- Yoav Rotman as Assaf Danon (season 1)
- Mickey Leon as Alex (season 1 - 2)
- Hilla Vidor as Ella (season 1 - 2)
- Nevo Kimchi as Giora Avni (season 1 - 2)
- Ido Bartal as Yonatan (season 1)
- Yaakov Daniel as Tzion (season 1 - 2)
- Shmil Ben Ari as P.M. Shmuel Netzer (season 1 - 2)
- Liat Stern as Neta (season 1 - 2)
- Michal Kalman as Sara (season 1 - 2)
- Ayelet Margalit as Tova Netzer (season 1 - 2)
- Yoav Levi as Amsalem (season 1 - 2)
- Nathan Avitz as Aviv Peled (season 2)
- Eli Cohen as Zinger (season 1 - 2)
- Sharon Tal as Michal (season 2)
- Avi Yakir as Moni (season 1)

== International sales ==
The Israeli version, Bnei Aruba, was presented to international buyers at MIPCOM in October 2013, and in December 2013, BBC Four announced it had acquired the series. BBC Four started showing it on 21 February 2015, with two episodes in tandem each Saturday night.

In January 2014, Canal+ acquired the Israeli series. A DVD release followed. Due to the series success in Europe, a second season was produced and acquired by Canal+, who broadcast it in March & April 2016.

The series' first season was released on Netflix in multiple regions in September 2016 with the second season following in June 2017.

In February 2017, the second season was released in the UK as an exclusive download on BBC Store.

In the UK, Arrow films released the first series on DVD in March 2015 and the second series in May 2017.

In 2017, season 1 and 2 were shown together under the title of Die Geiseln on German channel RTL Crime.

== Soundtrack ==
The soundtrack by Roy Nassee (of electronic music group Pick Right) and Alon Cohen was met with praise. The Arts Desk website described it as containing "threatening electro-metallic throb sounds which rarely let up". The Movie Waffler said that the score "builds such incredible amounts of tension to run nicely with the developing plot. Just from the first episode the tension is piled on and the music does that a lot throughout. It seems to trickle away like a bad nightmare down the back of your neck, lifting the hairs up as the action is presented on screen. In general the music is great and it’s the quick successive beats that get the heart racing". EQ view noted that the action was underpinned by a "terrific score by Alon Cohen and Roy Nassee that features minimalist electronics and sinister percussion that ebbs and flows through high tension scenes with a persistent menacing drone".

The soundtrack has not been officially released but selections from both seasons are available on the artists respective websites.

== Reception ==
=== Critical reception ===
Maariv said "you don't even notice the time pass and you're sitting with a dry throat and eyes glued to the screen. You're already booking the next episode and setting a reminder". Haaretz, another Israeli newspaper, said it "sets a new standard for Israeli TV".
In France, the series was also well-received by critics, with the newspaper L'Express describing it as "refined" and with a "stellar cast".

=== Awards ===
- Monte-Carlo Television Festival:
  - Best International Drama Series
  - Best Actress, Ayelet Zurer

== Remakes ==
Before any Israeli broadcaster had been secured, the rights were sold to the American network CBS, which adapted it for the US market as Hostages. Toni Collette, Tate Donovan and Dylan McDermott were cast in the leading roles. The US version premiered on 23 September 2013, a month before the Israeli premiere. It was cancelled after its first season on CBS due to poor ratings.

Sameer Nair of Applause Entertainment bought the rights for an Indian adaptation in April 2018, followed by the principal shooting which started in May 2018 and completed in March 2019. Marked as Sudhir Mishra's digital debut, the series was eventually premiered on Disney+ Hotstar on 31 May 2019.
