= The Syrian Bride =

- Film poster
- הכלה הסורית
- Directed by: Eran Riklis
- Written by: Suha Arraf; Eran Riklis
- Produced by: Bettina Brokemper
- Starring: Hiam Abbass; Makram Khoury; Clara Khoury
- Edited by: Tova Ascher
- Distributed by: Koch-Lorber Films
- Release date: 2 December 2004 (Israel)
- Running time: 97 minutes
- Countries: Israel; France; Germany
- Languages: Arabic; English; Hebrew; Russian; French

The Syrian Bride (Hebrew: הכלה הסורית, romanized: HaKala HaSurit) is a 2004 film directed by Eran Riklis. The story deals with a Druze wedding and the troubles the politically unresolved situation creates for the personal lives of the people in and from the village. The film's plot looks at the Arab–Israeli conflict through the story of a family divided by political borders and how their lives are fractured by the region's harsh political realities.

The film has garnered critical acclaim and has won or been nominated internationally for several notable awards.

== Plot ==
Set in the summer of 2000, Mona (Clara Khoury), a young Druze woman living at Majdal Shams in the Golan Heights, is about to marry a successful Syrian actor. Following the hostilities between Israel and Ba'athist Syria there is now a zone occupied by UNDOF in the Golan Heights. Crossing of the zone is extremely rare as it is only granted by both sides under special circumstances. It has taken 6 months to obtain permission from the Israeli administration for Mona to leave the Golan. When Mona crosses she will not be able to return to her family on the Golan even to visit. Mona is a bit hesitant also because she doesn't know her husband-to-be.

Her father Hammed (Makram Khoury) openly supports the reunification with Syria and has just been released on bail from an Israeli prison. For this personal sacrifice, he is respected by the elders of the village—yet when there is word that his son Hattem (Eyad Sheety) who has married Evelyna (Evelyn Kaplun), a Russian doctor, breaking with Druze tradition, is returning to see his sister off, they make it clear to the father that they will shun him too if he allows Hattem to come to the wedding.

Mona's sister Amal (Hiam Abbass) is unhappily married and has two daughters who are almost grown up. She is considered a somewhat free spirit as she and her daughters wear trousers. Now she is even considering training as a social worker. Her elder daughter wants to marry the son of a pro-Israeli villager. Amal's husband feels put in an awkward position, as tradition demands that the male head of the family control the other members to act in a socially acceptable manner. Amal is seen advising her daughter not to give up her studies irrespective of whatever pressures she may face from the family or society. This gives insight into Amal's persona.

The second brother, Marwan (Ashraf Barhom), is a shady merchant doing deals in Italy and obviously a womanizer. Yet nobody seems to object to his slightly unsettled lifestyle—quite a contrast to his brother who is only greeted by his mother and siblings.

Then, after the wedding feast, the bride is escorted to the border where her emigration runs into trouble, as the Israeli government has just decided to stamp the passports of Golan residents bound for Syria as leaving Israel. The Syrian officials still regard the Golan as part of Syria under foreign occupation, and a stamp like that is viewed as an underhanded ploy by the Israelis to force the Syrian side to implicitly acknowledge the annexation.

So, the UN liaison officer Jeanne goes back and forth until the Israeli official who put the stamp into the passport in the first place finally agrees to erase it with some correction fluid. Yet just as the problem seems to have been peacefully resolved, the solution is threatened by a change of position on the Syrian side.

In the end, when it looks as if the wedding will be delayed at least for some days (which is regarded as a bad omen), the bride takes matters into her own hands. In our final view of her, she is walking with energy and determination toward the Syrian border; at the same time, Amal walks away from the group with a determined face as if she would shatter the invisible fences which prevent her from pursuing her dreams.

== Cast ==
- Hiam Abbass as Amal
- Makram Khoury as Hammed
- Clara Khoury as Mona
- Ashraf Barhom as Marwan
- Ali Suliman as Syrian officer 2
- Evelyn Kaplun as Evelyna
- Julie-Anne Roth as Jeanne
- Adnan Tarabshi as Amin

== Reception ==
2011 VOA report about Golan Druze reflecting the themes of the film

On review aggregator Rotten Tomatoes the film has a score of 86% based on reviews from 42 critics, with an average 7.1/10 rating. Based on 9 critics on Metacritic, the film has a score of 70 out of a 100, indicating "generally favorable reviews".

Ruthe Stein of the San Francisco Chronicle called the film "thoughtful and engaging", while Roger Ebert of the Chicago Sun Times wrote "The real interest in the film enters by the side door, through supporting characters".

Marjorie Baumgarten of The Austin Chronicle criticized the characters for being "difficult to warm up to", but admired The Syrian Bride's "depiction of bureaucratic frustrations and familial woe".

In a review for The Boston Globe, Ty Burr wrote "Amal becomes the heart of [the film] and Abbass its most poignant treasure".

Magazine periodicals such as Variety and Slant was also praising the film with Nick Schager of Slant for example, writing "The inability to communicate becomes, in The Syrian Bride, a problem both political and personal",

According to Kenneth Turan of the Los Angeles Times, "It is written, directed and acted with real compassion and sympathy for the humanity of its characters, no matter who they are or on what side of these multiple issues they turn out to be".

Stephen Holden of The New York Times couldn't agree more. He added: "Eran Riklis's tightly wound film is about a bride-to-be trapped between Syria and Israel".

Tasha Robinson of The A.V. Club was of another opinion. She wrote: "The Syrian Bride becomes an overtly political movie, but with all its loose threads and random directions, it feels more like the pilot for an unmade miniseries".

== Awards ==
- 2004 Montreal World Film Festival, "Grand Prix" (Best Film Award) – Eran Riklis
- 2004 Flanders International Film Festival, "Best Screenplay"
- 2004 Locarno International Film Festival, "Audience Award"
- 2005 Bangkok International Film Festival, "Golden Kinnaree Award" (Best Film Award)
- 2005 European Film Award nomination, "Best Actress" – Hiam Abbass

== See also ==
- Cup Final (1991)
- Lemon Tree (2008)
