= Lemon Tree (2008 film) =

2008 Israeli-Palestinian drama film

- International release poster
- Hebrew: עץ לימון
- Arabic: شجرة ليمون
- Directed by: Eran Riklis
- Written by: Eran Riklis; Suha Arraf
- Produced by: Eran Riklis
- Starring: Hiam Abbass; Ali Suliman; Rona Lipaz-Michael; Doron Tavory
- Cinematography: Rainer Klusmann
- Edited by: Tova Asher
- Music by: Habib Shehadeh Hanna
- Production companies: Heimatfilm; MACT Productions; Eran Riklis Productions; Riva Filmproduktion; Arte France Cinéma; ZDF; Metro Communications; United King Films; Citrus Film Investors
- Release date: March 27, 2008; (Israel)
- Running time: 106 minutes
- Countries: Israel; Germany; France
- Languages: Arabic; Hebrew
- Box office: $7,387,488

Lemon Tree (Hebrew: עץ לימון, romanized: 'Etz Limon; Arabic: شجرة ليمون, romanized: 'Shajaret Leimoun) is a 2008 drama film directed by Eran Riklis, co-written by Suha Arraf. Starring Hiam Abbass, Ali Suliman, Danny Leshman and Rona Lipaz-Michael, it follows the legal efforts of a Palestinian widow to stop the Israeli Defense Minister, her new next door neighbor, from destroying the lemon trees in her family farm. At the same time, she develops a human bond with the minister's wife.

The film is loosely based on a true story where trees were finally uprooted in the interest of Shaul Mofaz, Israeli Defense Minister from 2002 to 2006.

The film had its world premiere in the Panorama section of the 58th Berlin International Film Festival, and was theatrically released in Israel on 27 March 2008. It received a tepid response from Israeli audiences, but was well received internationally. It was nominated for Best Actress (Abbass) and Best Screenwriter at the 21st European Film Awards.

== Plot ==
The Israeli Defense Minister Israel Navon (Doron Tavory) moves to a house on the border between Israel and the West Bank, with the building sitting on the Israeli side just next to the dividing line. The Israeli Secret Service views the neighboring lemon grove of Salma Zidane (Hiam Abbass), a Palestinian widow whose family has cared for the area for generations, as a threat to the minister and his wife. The security forces soon set up a guard post and a fence around the grove. They then obtain an order to uproot the lemon trees.

Salma feels isolated given that her son has moved to Washington, D.C., and her daughters are now married. The local village elder Abu Kamal (Makram Khoury) advises her to give in, but Salma decides to work with the young lawyer Ziad Daud (Ali Suliman) and a tenderness grows between the two lonely people. They take their case all the way to the Supreme Court. Mira Navon (Rona Lipaz-Michael), the minister's wife, sympathizes with Salma. The court case receives notable media attention, and Mira gives a news interview that her husband regrets. Mira believes that the Israeli military overreacted, and she also shares Salma's sense of personal loneliness. Although they hardly speak to each other, a complex human bond develops between the two women.

The Supreme Court rules that the military does not need to uproot Salma's lemon orchard, but they may prune to the stumps up to half of her trees. They do this and erect a high concrete wall to protect the minister's house. Mira decides to leave her husband, while Salma no longer sees Ziad.

== Cast ==
- Hiam Abbass as Salma Zidane
- Ali Suliman as Ziad Daud
- Rona Lipaz-Michael as Mira Navon
- Doron Tavory as Defense Minister Israel Navon
- Tarik Kopty as Abu Hussam
- Amos Lavi as Commander Jacob
- Amnon Wolf as Leibowitz

== Production ==
=== Production details ===
Director Eran Riklis covered personal relationships between Arabs and Middle Eastern Jews in his previous films The Syrian Bride and Cup Final. The former film, which also starred Hiam Abbass, achieved widespread success in Israel as well as with international audiences after its 2004 release. This boosted Riklis's expectations for the future.

The plot of Lemon Tree was based on a real-life incident. Israeli Defense Minister Shaul Mofaz moved to the border within Israel and the occupied territories and security forces began cutting down the lemon trees beside his house, arguing that it could be used by terrorists as a hiding place. The Palestinian family who owned the trees sued the minister and took the case all the way to the Israeli Supreme Court. They lost, and their trees had to be cut down. Riklis watched a news blurb about the case online. He then developed the story further in a fictional setting. Riklis explicitly designed the protagonist's part for actress Hiam Abbass.

The characters in the film speak Arabic and Hebrew. Riklis' personal company, Eran Riklis Production, filmed the movie. It was shot in the cities of Qalqilya and Ramallah and the Jalazone refugee camp as well on location at and around the Supreme Court of Israel building in Sha'arey Mishpat Street, Jerusalem. Salon film critic Andrew O'Hehir has commented, "Riklis forges into areas other Israeli filmmakers won't venture."

=== Subject material ===
Riklis designed the film to be essentially apolitical, focusing on character development rather than exploring the issues of the Israeli–Palestinian conflict. He has said that he created a 'fairy tale quality' to the film in which the audience can sympathize with all of the people featured in it. He stated "I wanted to populate this film with a lot of faces and give each character their own moment of grace, even when, on the surface, it's one of the 'bad guys,' so to speak.. ... This film does address the ugly side of occupation perhaps, yet no blood is spilled." A fictional representation of the Israeli West Bank barrier punctuates the film throughout.

Andrew O'Hehir argued that Riklis "depicts all versions of Middle Eastern authority with a cheerful, agnostic cynicism", portraying the Palestinian government as "corrupt and obsessed with status and protocol" and the Israeli government as "hypocritical and mindlessly bureaucratic." V. A. Musetto of the New York Post argued that the movie expresses Riklis' opposition to Israeli policies of confiscation of Palestinian land. Critic Hugh Hart of the San Francisco Chronicle thought that the movie displayed a natural sympathy towards its protagonist. Mark Jenkins of NPR commented that some of the ironic moments in the film depicted Palestinian resistance to Israelis as "more concerned with preserving machismo than with producing results".

The New York Times wrote

Although "Lemon Tree" doesn't overtly take sides in the Israeli-Palestinian conflict, it portrays the Israelis, who wield more military power, as abusive and arrogant in the way that any country with superior weapons and armies inevitably appears. The security guards on Navon's property behave like strutting goons—only too eager to turn their guns on the first thing that moves—or clowns, like the watchtower guard nicknamed Quickie, who dozes off while on duty.

Riklis tried not to make the film explicitly feminist, with the female characters portrayed more sympathetically than the male ones. However, he has said that it can be interpreted that way by viewers. NPR's Mark Jenkins has stated that the film's bittersweet ending depicted the difficult status of women in Palestine as well as Palestinian-Israeli relations. Chris Cabin of the AMC Network criticized the film as being too "fem-centric" and as having a uniformly negative treatment of its male characters.

== Reception ==
The film was released in Israel on 27 March 2008, and it was released internationally through IFC Films on 17 April 2009. The film has been very well received internationally. Rotten Tomatoes gave the film an approval rating of 91%, based on 69 reviews with an average rating of 7/10. The website's critical consensus states that the film is "A positive and personal Israeli film that offers an understated and thought-provoking vision of the West Bank troubles." It also earned an average critical score of 73, a generally favorable response, on Metacritic.

The New York Times named it a 'Critics Pick' of 2009. Andrew O'Hehir of Salon praised the film and called its production a sign "of hope in the impenetrable impasse of the contemporary Middle East". Benjamin Secher of The Daily Telegraph labeled it "absorbing, sensitive, beautifully-shot" and drew favorable comparisons with Erin Brockovich. Mark Jenkins of National Public Radio stated that it featured "subtle performances by its striking stars" and served as a parable about border issues. AMC's Chris Cabin criticized the movie, arguing that its director "seems not to have the faintest idea of how to properly approach the subject", because the film is, in Cabin's view, "unabashedly pro-Palestine".

=== Box office ===
According to Box Office Mojo, the film has brought in a total of $6,628,437 worldwide. In the United States, it brought in $569,672 in its seventeen-week run. It premiered on 17 April 2009.

The film performed poorly with Israeli audiences despite the positive reaction in other areas. Riklis has said that Israelis have the "false impression" that the film is pro-Palestinian and polemical. The Palestinian reaction has been very positive, according to Riklis. He expected a far more positive reception in Israel given the success of his previous film, The Syrian Bride, in 2004. The film did receive praise from Hannah Brown of The Jerusalem Post, who stated that "it's hard to ask for more" and "you will leave the theater craving a glass of the lemonade Salma prepares so lovingly in several scenes". Haaretz also praised the movie before its release.

=== Awards ===
- At the Berlin Film Festival, Riklis won a 'Panorama Audience Award'.
- In the Asia Pacific Screen Awards, Abbass won for 'Best Performance by an Actress' and Riklis won, along with collaborator Suha Arraf, for 'Best Screenplay'.
- Arraf and Riklis were nominated for 'Best Screenwriter' at the European Film Awards, and Abbass was nominated for 'Best Actress'.
- In the Israeli Film Academy, Abbass won for 'Best Actress'. The film's Miguel Markin was nominated for 'Best Art Direction', Rona Doron for 'Best Costume Design', Tova Asher for 'Best Editing', Habib Shadah for 'Best Music', Gil Toren and As Milo for 'Best Sound', and Riklis for 'Best Director'.

== See also ==
- Israeli West Bank barrier
- The Cherry Orchard
- Israeli films of the 2000s
- Shaul Mofaz
- Cup Final (1991)
- The Syrian Bride (2004)
