= Yonatan Uziel =

Israeli actor and model (born 1975)

- יונתן עוזיאל
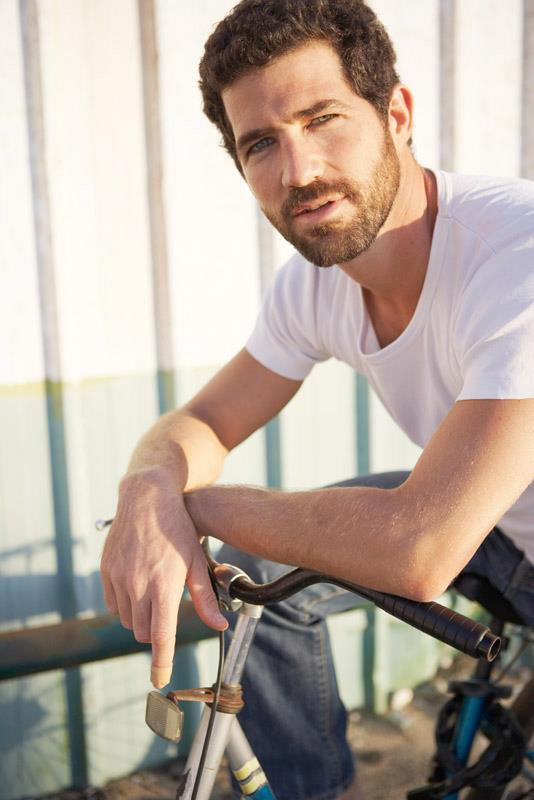
- Yonatan Uziel
- Born: Yonatan Uziel; March 26, 1975 (age 51); Jerusalem, Israel
- Occupations: Actor; model

Yonatan Uziel (Hebrew: יונתן עוזיאל; born March 26, 1975) is an Israeli actor and model best known for appearing in Prisoners of War and Hostages.

== Early life and education ==
Uziel was born in Jerusalem and grew up in Tel Aviv. His mother is a former school principal and his father is an importer. He served as a youth counselor in the Education Corps and after completing his army service he began studying towards a BA in Economics and Education at the Hebrew University of Jerusalem. Then he turned to acting, taking classes at Nissan Nativ Acting Studio, which he completed in 2002. From 2003 to 2004, he studied at the Akt-Zent Studio in Moscow and Berlin performing in several plays.

In 2004–2008 he studied for a BA in philosophy and theater at Tel Aviv University and received a teaching certificate. Uziel began teaching acting classes during this period and in 2009 he founded the theater department at the Kfar HaYarok youth village and managed it until 2016.

== Career ==
In 2003 he made his debut film appearance in Omri Levi's Miss Entebbe alongside Yael Abecassis. Two years later he had a minor role in Steven Spielberg's Mossad thriller, Munich. In 2006 he appeared in the drama, O Jerusalem.

In 2007 he began appearing in the Israeli romance drama, Until the Wedding. His role as Eyal, a macho-type character catapulted him to "sex symbol" status in Israel. The American Broadcasting Company is currently developing an American remake of the series.

He also appeared in the series Srugim in 2008. In 2010 he appeared in the American thriller, The Debt. In 2012 he was cast as a series regular playing Yinon 'Noni' Meiri in Gideon Raff's critically acclaimed series, Prisoners of War.

In 2014 he was cast as a series regular in the medical drama series, Temporarily Dead playing Dr. Alon Karmi alongside Fauda actors Tzachi Halevy and Yuval Segal. In 2016 he had a regular role as Boaz in the second season of Hostages alongside Jonah Lotan.

== Personal life ==
Uziel lives in Tel Aviv.

== Filmography ==
Year	Title	Role	Notes
2003	Miss Entebbe		מיס אנטבה
2005	Munich	Commando	
2006	O Jerusalem	Post manager	
2007	Naor's Friends	Army Commander	Episode: New Friend
2008	Until the Wedding	Eyal	Series regular
2008	Marriage Agreement	Buki	Menahem Golan film
2008	Maftir	Elio	
2008	The Island	Policeman	3 episodes
2008	Srugim	Dudi	
2010	The Debt	Mossad Agent	
2010	Guest	Adam	Short film
2011	Acre Prison Break	Gidon plei	Short film
2012	Allenby	Omer	TV series created by Gadi Taub
2012	Prisoners of War	Yinon 'Noni' Meiri	Season 2 series regular
2013–2016	Irreversible	Roy	3 episodes
2016	Hostages	Boaz	Season 2 regular
2017	Soup		Short film
2014–2017	Temporarily Dead	Dr. Alon Karmi	Series regular
2019	The Spy	Colonel Dagan	2 episodes
2022	Exceptional	Shay	7 episodes
2024	Krav Avir		
2025	Bros		8 episodes
