= Abdallah El Akal =

Arab-Israeli actor

- عبد الله عقل עבדאללה אל-עקל
- Born: Tel Aviv, Israel
- Occupation: Actor
- Years active: 2005–present

Abdallah El Akal (Arabic: عبد الله عقل, Hebrew: עבדאללה אל-עקל; ) is an Israeli actor known for his lead role as Fahed in Zaytoun. He co-starred alongside American actor Stephen Dorff. El Akal was born in Tel Aviv and continues to reside there.

== Filmography ==
=== Film ===
Year	Title	Role	Notes
2007	Strangers	Rashid	
2009	Lebanon	Lebanese Boy	
2010	Miral	Deir Yassin Boy	
2010	Od Ani Holech	Kid	
2011	A Bottle in the Gaza Sea	Daoud	
2011	David & Kamal	Kamal	Won the "Best Lead Actor" award for his role as Kamal in David & Kamal at the 2012 Brasov International Film Festival in Romania.
2012	The Attack	Street Vendor in West Bank	
2012	The Dealers	Street Dealer	
2012	Rock the Casbah	Refugee	
2012	Zaytoun	Fahed	
2014	Tyrant	Fahmy	Episode State of Emergency

=== Television ===
Year	Title	Role	Notes
2005	Miluim	Hamid	1 episode
2006	Djihad!	Child	TV film
2010	Half a Ton of Bronze	Doctor	TV film
2010	Arab Labor	Boy	1 episode
2010–11	Prisoners of War	Ismail	2 episodes
