= Forgiveness (2006 film) =

- Directed by: Udi Aloni
- Written by: Udi Aloni; Paul Hond
- Produced by: Micky Rabinovitz; David Silber; Lemore Syvan
- Starring: Itay Tiran; Clara Khoury; Moni Moshonov; Makram Khoury; Tamara Mansour
- Cinematography: Amnon Zlayet
- Edited by: Galia Moors
- Production companies: Metro Communications; Elevation Filmworks
- Distributed by: International Film Circuit
- Release dates: 11 February 2006 (Berlin International Film Festival); 21 September 2006 (Israel)
- Running time: 97 minutes
- Country: Israel
- Languages: Hebrew; English; Arabic

Forgiveness is a 2006 Israeli drama film directed by Udi Aloni, starring Itay Tiran, Clara Khoury, Moni Moshonov, Makram Khoury and Tamara Mansour. It tells the story of David Adler, a 20-year old American-Israeli who decides to move back to Israel, only to find himself committed to a mental institution that sits on the ruins of Deir Yassin.

== Cast ==
- Itay Tiran as David Adler
- Clara Khoury as Lila
- Moni Moshonov as Muselmann
- Makram Khoury as Dr. Isaac Shemesh
- Tamara Mansour as Little Girl/Ghost
- Mike Sarne as Henry Adler

== Release ==
The film presented in 2006 at the Berlin International Film Festival, the Tokyo International Film Festival, Locarno International Film Festival, the Woodstock Film Festival, and the Jerusalem Film Festival, and was described by Slavoj Žižek as "maybe the most beautiful, powerful and important film ever made about the tragedies of the region."

The film took the Audience Favorite Award at the Woodstock Film Festival in 2006. Aside from this win, it was nominated for the Wolgin Award for Best Israeli Feature at the Jerusalem Film Festival and the Tokyo Grand Prix at the Tokyo International Film Festival

The film also had its Middle-Eastern premiere in Ramallah. It stirred up controversy when the Israeli embassy in Paris threatened to withdraw funding from the Israeli Film Festival in Paris (Israelien de Paris) should they open the festival with the film.

The film was released in the United States on 12 September 2008. Its theatrical release in the United States opened with Mariam Said, the widow of late Edward Said, reading the poetry of Mahmoud Darwish.

== Reception ==
Sara Schieron of Boxoffice Magazine rated the film 2.5 stars out of 5 and wrote that while the film is "tricky and sometimes perplexing", it is "seldom muddled and always sticking its neck out to reach toward some, if manic, exposition of the truths that lie beneath." Film critic Emanuel Levy wrote that while the "subject is nothing less than riveting" and the "honorable intention of the filmmakers is not in doubt" the narrative strategy and technical execution "leave much to be desired". Michelle Orange of The Village Voice wrote that the "broad strokes" are "overlaid with an impressionistic vigor and thematic intricacy that, had the director not succumbed to their extremes—a kind of insular sprawl, creating distance where interiority is the intent—might have elevated the film from its moorings."

Tasha Robinson of The A.V. Club gave the film a rating of "C" and wrote that "Aloni's ideas are solid, but possibly too large and pointed to cram within fragile human flesh." Jeannette Catsoulis of The New York Times wrote that while "the message may be clear", the "execution is a mess." Hannah Brown of The Jerusalem Post rated the film 1 star and wrote that while "the message may be clear", the "execution is a mess."
