= The Debt (2010 film) =

- Theatrical release poster
- Directed by: John Madden
- Screenplay by: Matthew Vaughn; Jane Goldman; Peter Straughan
- Based on: The Debt (2007 film) by Assaf Bernstein; Ido Rosenblum
- Produced by: Matthew Vaughn; Kris Thykier
- Starring: Helen Mirren; Jessica Chastain; Sam Worthington; Ciarán Hinds; Tom Wilkinson; Marton Csokas; Jesper Christensen; Romi Aboulafia; Yonatan Uziel
- Cinematography: Ben Davis
- Edited by: Alexander Berner
- Music by: Thomas Newman
- Production companies: Marv Films; Miramax (Note: International releases of The Debt credit the company as presenter under its former name, Miramax Films.)
- Distributed by: Focus Features (United States); Universal Pictures International (International)
- Release dates: 4 September 2010 (Deauville); 31 August 2011 (USA); 30 September 2011 (UK)
- Running time: 113 minutes
- Countries: United Kingdom; United States
- Languages: English; German; Russian
- Budget: $20 million
- Box office: $45.6 million

The Debt is a 2010 thriller film directed by John Madden from a screenplay written by Matthew Vaughn, Jane Goldman and Peter Straughan. It is an English-language remake of the 2007 Israeli film. It stars Helen Mirren, Sam Worthington, Jessica Chastain, Ciarán Hinds, Tom Wilkinson, Marton Csokas and Jesper Christensen.

Although ready for release in July 2010, and scheduled for a December 2010 release in the United States, the film only toured various film festivals during the autumn of 2010 and spring of 2011. It did not see a general release until it was released in France on 15 June 2011, followed by Kazakhstan and Russia in July 2011, and the United States, Canada, and India on 31 August 2011.

== Plot ==
In 1997, Rachel Singer is honoured by her daughter Sarah during a release party in Tel Aviv for Sarah's book, based on the account Rachel, Stefan, and David gave of the events in 1965. Concurrently, David is escorted from his apartment by an Israeli government agent for a debriefing. David recognises Stefan waiting in another vehicle and, unable to face their lie, he commits suicide by stepping in front of an oncoming truck.

In 1965, Rachel, a young Mossad agent on her first field assignment, arrives in East Berlin to meet with more experienced agents David Peretz and Stefan Gold. Their mission is to capture Nazi war criminal Dieter Vogel, infamously known as "The Surgeon of Birkenau" for his medical experiments on Jews during World War II, and bring him to justice in Israel. Rachel and David present themselves as a married couple from Argentina, and Rachel becomes a patient at Vogel's obstetrics and gynaecology clinic.

Rachel plans to have a gynaecological examination at Vogel's clinic. To present herself as a married woman who has recently had intercourse, she wants to sleep with David but does not explain why. Although the two have feelings for each other, David resists her overture. Instead, she sleeps with Stefan.

At the appointment and during an uncomfortable pelvic exam, Rachel injects Vogel with a sedative and convinces the nurse to believe that he has suffered a heart attack. Stefan and David arrive dressed as paramedics and leave with the unconscious Vogel in an ambulance. They attempt to leave by train, but Vogel awakens and sounds the horn of the van where he is being held, alerting guards to their presence. When gunfire erupts, David saves the compromised Rachel. The Mossad agents have no choice but to bring Vogel to their apartment and plan a new extraction.

David and Stefan take turns monitoring and feeding Vogel while leaving him chained to the wall heater. During his shift, David becomes violently enraged by Vogel's Nazi view that Jews have many weaknesses, such as selfishness, making them easily subdued. David smashes a bowl over Vogel's head and starts repeatedly beating him. Rachel runs in and tries to stop him but David unknowingly hits her while still hitting Vogel. David is finally restrained and pulled out of the room by Stefan.

Rachel goes into the bathroom to wash the blood off her face, leaving Vogel alone. Vogel surreptitiously grabs a shard of the broken bowl and starts cutting through his bonds. When Rachel returns to the room Vogel attacks her with the shard, throwing her against the wall and knocking her unconscious. Vogel opens the front door, runs down the stairs, and escapes.

Stefan, panicking and hoping to avoid humiliation, makes up a story that Rachel shot and killed Vogel when he tried to escape, and they were able to get rid of the body. Rachel insists they cannot lie about what happened but David, who is blaming himself for Vogel escaping, agrees to lie. Stefan pushes Rachel to reluctantly agree.

When Rachel discovers she is pregnant, she marries Stefan, the father of her child, although she loves David. In the following years, the agents are venerated as national heroes for their roles in the mission.

A generation later, at a dinner celebrating their daughter's book release, Stefan takes Rachel aside to set a meeting to discuss new information he has obtained. Later, at David's flat, Stefan provides evidence that Vogel is in a mental hospital in Ukraine, and is soon scheduled to be interviewed by a local journalist.

Stefan claims David killed himself because he was a coward. Rachel refutes Stefan's explanation, recalling an encounter with David a day before his suicide, in which he revealed his shame about the lie and disclosed that he had spent years unsuccessfully searching the world for Vogel so he could finally be brought to justice. He was further disheartened by Rachel's admission that she would continue propagating the lie to protect those closest to her, particularly her daughter.

Nevertheless, Rachel finally feels compelled to travel to Kyiv. She investigates the journalist's lead and is able to travel to the asylum. She reaches the room just minutes before the journalist and discovers the man claiming to be Vogel is not him. Describing the encounter to Stefan over the phone, Rachel declares she will not continue to lie about the 1965 mission. She leaves a note for the journalist and suddenly spots the real Vogel among the other patients and follows him to an isolated area of the hospital.

After a confrontation in which Vogel stabs her twice with scissors, Rachel kills Vogel by plunging a poisoned syringe into his back. Later Rachel's note is discovered and read by the journalist. It describes the truth of the mission, ready to be relayed to the world.

== Cast ==
- Helen Mirren as Rachel Singer (1997)
- Jessica Chastain as Rachel Singer (1965/1970)
- Ciarán Hinds as David Peretz (1997)
- Sam Worthington as David Peretz (1965/1970)
- Tom Wilkinson as Stefan Gold (1997)
- Marton Csokas as Stefan Gold (1965/1970)
- Jesper Christensen as Dieter Vogel / Dr. Bernhardt
- Romi Aboulafia as Sarah Gold
- Brigitte Kren as Mrs. Bernhardt
- Morris Perry as Ivan Schevchuk
- István Göz as Yuri Titov
- Yonatan Uziel as Mossad Agent

== Production ==
Israeli papers reported that Mirren was "immersing herself" in studies of the Hebrew language, Jewish history, and Holocaust writings, including the life of Simon Wiesenthal while spending time in Israel in 2009 to shoot scenes in the film. "My character is carrying the memory, anger and passion of the Holocaust," she said.

== Release ==
The film premiered at the Deauville American Film Festival in France on 4 September 2010, followed by 2010 Toronto International Film Festival on 14 September 2010, and various other festivals during the autumn of 2010 and spring of 2011.

The film was ready to be released already in early July 2010, when it was submitted to the British Board of Film Classification, and Miramax had originally announced plans to release it in the United States on December 29, 2010, and it quickly began to appear on lists of possible 2011 Oscar contenders. However, the film was one of two that had their official opening dates delayed until 2011 because of the transfer of Miramax from its previous owner Disney and the new owner Filmyard.

The film saw its first general release in France on 15 June 2011, followed by Kazakhstan and Russia in July 2011, and the United States, Canada, and India on 31 August 2011.

== Critical reception ==
Review aggregator Rotten Tomatoes reports that 77% of the 185 critics gave the film a positive review. The site's consensus states, "Its time-shifting narrative creates distracting casting problems, but ultimately, The Debt is a smart, well-acted entry in a genre that could use more like it." Metacritic assigned the film a weighted average score of 65 out of 100 based on 37 critics, indicating "generally favorable reviews".

Victoria Alexander of Films in Review said of the film, "The twists are shocking and mesmerizing. A high wire, intelligent espionage thriller. It is one of the best movies of 2011."

Roger Ebert of the Chicago Sun-Times gave the film two-and-a-half stars out of four:

Maybe the problem is a structure that cuts around in time. Three characters, six actors, and although the woman is always presumably Rachel, I was sometimes asking myself which of the two men I was seeing when younger. In a thriller, you must be sure. I suspect this film would have been more effective if it had remained entirely in the past, especially given all we know.

Richard Middleton-Kaplan cited the film as a recent example of a work playing to the myth of Jewish passivity during the Holocaust, because the Mossad agents do not effectively rebut the doctor's claims:

Contrasted against presumed Jewish passivity is the doctor’s own resistance as he fights against his captors, kicking, spitting in their faces, laughing at their authority, and ultimately escaping; in short, he does everything that Jews are assumed not to have done. The audience is left to wonder why, if this old doctor was able to escape from his captors, Jews were not able to fight back and escape theirs.
