= Ali Suliman =

Palestinian actor (born 1977)

- علي سليمان
- Born: October 10, 1977 (age 49); Nazareth
- Occupations: Actor, film producer
- Years active: 1996–present

Ali Suliman (Arabic: علي سليمان, Hebrew: עלי סלימאן; born 1977) is a Palestinian actor. He is known for his work on the series Jack Ryan and the film Paradise Now.

== Early life ==
Suliman was born in Nazareth into a Palestinian Muslim family. He holds Israeli citizenship but identifies as Palestinian. He graduated from Yoram Loewenstein Performing Arts Studio and started his career in the theater.

== Career ==
In 2005, Suliman starred in the Palestinian film Paradise Now, which won the Golden Globe Award for Best Foreign Language Film and was nominated for an Academy Award in the same category. In 2007, he appeared in the movie The Kingdom. He played a lawyer in Lemon Tree (2008), the role of Omar Sadiki in Body of Lies (2008), a young displaced Palestinian in The Time That Remains (2009), a surgeon in The Attack (2013), Gulab in Lone Survivor (2013) and General Qamish in The Looming Tower (2018). In 2018, he played Mousa Bin Suleiman in the Amazon Prime Video action thriller series Jack Ryan.

== Selected filmography ==
Year	Title	Role	Notes
1996	Chronicle of a Disappearance	The Man	
2004	The Syrian Bride	Syrian Officer	
2005	Paradise Now	Khaled	
2007	The Kingdom	Sergeant Haytham	
2008	The Prince of Venice	Waleed	Short film
2008	Lemon Tree	Ziad Daud	
2008	Body of Lies	Omar Sadiki	
2009	The Time That Remains	Eliza's Boyfriend	
2011	The Last Friday	Yousef	
2011	Do Not Forget Me Istanbul	Fayiz	
2012	The Attack	Amin Jaafari	
2012	Inheritance	Marwan	
2012	Cruel Summer	King	Short film
2012	Zaytoun	Syrian Officer	
2013	Everywhere But Here	Salach	
2013	Lone Survivor	Gulab	
2014	Flying Home	Sheikh	
2014	A Borrowed Identity	Salah	
2014	Mars at Sunrise	Khaled	
2015	Rattle the Cage	Dabaan	
2016	Harmonia	Daod	
2017	The Escape	Cabir	Co-producer
2019	It Must Be Heaven		
2020	200 Meters	Mustafa	
2021	Farha	Abu Walid	
2022	The Swimmers	Ezzat Mardini	
2024	Arthur the King	Chik	
2025	Yunan		Premiere at 75th Berlin International Film Festival in February.

== Selected television ==
- 2011 : Homeland
- 2011 : The Promise
- 2017 : The State
- 2018 : Jack Ryan
- 2018 : The Looming Tower
- 2025–present : House of David
- TBA : Prime Target

== Selected theater ==
- 2000 : At The Heart of the See
- 2000 : The Wise Nathan
- 2001 : A View from the Bridge
- 2002 : The Mission
- 2002 : Antar
- 2002 : The Heart’s Key
- 2002 : Waiting for Godot
- 2003 : Can-Opener
- 2004 : The Glass Menagerie
- 2005 : The storm
- 2005 : Salome
- 2007 : Forget Herostratos by Gregore Goren
- 2007 : The Sneeze
- 2008 : The beggarly that exchanged
- 2009 : I Am Yusuf and This Is My Brother

== Awards ==
Year	Result	Award	Category	Work
2015	Won	Alexandria International Film Festival	Best Actor	Mars at Sunrise
2011	Won	Dubai International Film Festival	Best Actor	The Last Friday
2012	Won	Carthage Film Festival	Best Actor	The Last Friday
