= Spider in the Web =

- Directed by: Eran Riklis
- Written by: Gidon Maron; Emmanuel Naccache
- Produced by: Sabine Brian; Jacqueline de Goeij; Leon Edery; Moshe Edery; Eran Riklis; Michael Sharfstein
- Starring: Ben Kingsley; Monica Bellucci; Itay Tiran
- Cinematography: Richard Van Oosterhout
- Edited by: Jessica de Koning
- Music by: Jonathan Riklis
- Production companies: Eran Riklis Productions Ciné Cri De Coeur; Film Constellation; Topia Communications United King Films
- Distributed by: United King Films; Tanweer Alliances
- Release dates: 30 August 2019 (United States); 16 January 2020 (Israel)
- Running time: 113 minutes
- Countries: Israel; Belgium; United Kingdom
- Languages: English; Arabic; Hebrew

Spider in the Web is a 2019 spy thriller film directed and co-produced by Eran Riklis, produced by Sabine Brian, Jacqueline de Goeij, Leon Edrey and Michael Sharfstein with screenplay written by Gidon Maron and Emmanuel Naccahe. Starring Ben Kingsley, Monica Bellucci, Itzik Cohen and Itay Tiran, Spider in the Web focuses on a young operative who is sent on a mission to follow an older agent, whose behavior has come into question.

The film is an international co-production of Israel, Belgium and United Kingdom that was released on 30 August 2019 in the United States and on 16 January 2020 in Israel.

== Cast ==
- Ben Kingsley as Adereth
- Monica Bellucci as Angela Caroni
- Itay Tiran as Daniel
- Itzik Cohen as Samuel
- Filip Peeters as Jan Martens
- Hilde Van Mieghem as Anne-Marie

== Reception ==
On Rotten Tomatoes, the film has a rating of 67% based on reviews from 9 critics.

Noel Murray of the Los Angeles Times called it "the kind of story that’s been told many times in literary spy novels" but that it was "a magnificent showcase for Kingsley, who's always at his best when his characters look like they know something we don't." Frank Scheck of The Hollywood Reporter wrote: "Tinker tailor soldier snooze."
