= Zaytoun (film) =

Zaytoun זייתון زيتون
- Theatrical release poster
- Directed by: Eran Riklis
- Written by: Nader Rizq
- Produced by: Gareth Unwin; Fred Ritzenberg
- Starring: Stephen Dorff; Abdallah El Akal
- Cinematography: Dan Laustsen
- Edited by: Hervé Schneid
- Music by: Cyril Morin
- Production companies: Bedlam Productions; Far Films; H.W. Buffalo & Co
- Distributed by: Pathé (France); Strand Releasing (US)
- Release date: 9 September 2012 (Toronto International Film Festival)
- Running time: 110 minutes
- Countries: Israel; United Kingdom; France
- Languages: Hebrew; Arabic; English
- Box office: $42,330 (domestic) $129,288 (international) $171,618 (worldwide)

Zaytoun (Hebrew: זייתון, Arabic: زيتون, romanized: Zaytūn, "Olive") is a 2012 Israeli adventure thriller film directed by Eran Riklis and produced by Gareth Unwin and Fred Ritzenberg. It premiered in September 2012 at the Toronto International Film Festival.

The screenplay was written by Nader Rizq, a Palestinian-American living in the United States. What started as a hobby in 1991 ended up making the semi-finals of the 2001 Nicholl Fellowships run by the Academy of Motion Picture Arts and Sciences. Subsequent re-writes again placed in the Nicholls and semi-finaled in the Ohio Independent Screenplay Awards. In late 2007, American producer Fred Ritzenberg came aboard and helped further develop the script.

== Plot ==
During the 1982 Lebanon War, an Israeli fighter pilot, Yoni, is shot down over Beirut and captured by the Palestine Liberation Organization. Fahed, a precocious young Palestinian refugee who is angered by the death of his father in an Israeli air attack, agrees to help Yoni escape and lead him out of the city if Yoni will get him over the border and back to his family's ancestral village, where Fahed intends to plant an olive tree that his father had been tending in Beirut. As they embark on a hazardous road trip across the war-ravaged country, Yoni and Fahed move from suspicion and mutual antagonism to a tentative camaraderie as they make their way closer to the place they both call home.

== Cast ==
- Stephen Dorff as Yoni
- Abdallah El Akal as Fahed
- Loai Noufi as Aboudi
- Ashraf Barhom
- Alice Taglioni as Leclair
- Ali Suliman as Syrian soldier
- Tarik Kopty as Seedo
- Mira Awad as Im Ahmed
- Ashraf Farah as Khaled
- Morad Hassan as Rami
- Doraid Liddawi as Syrian soldier
- Jony Arbid as Abu Fahed
- Nidal Badarneh as Mustafa
- Osamah Khoury as Hassan
- Michil Khoury as Ali

== Production ==
Most of the Beirut scenes were filmed in Haifa.

== Controversy ==
The screenwriter Nader Rizq, has since come out speaking about changes made to his screenplay in violation of his integrity as an artist and spokesman for his people's rights. He mentions being excluded from the decision process which resulted in the last minute changes to the screenplay, yet he insisted on, and received sole writing credit.

He described a process where "Only Israeli concerns were addressed, Israeli opinions expressed, and Israeli versions of history permitted. Alternate perspectives were simply unacceptable. And no measure of carefully documented alarm made an iota of difference."

Examples of changes to Rizq's script include:

- Opening the film with a slide stating that the Israeli attack on Lebanon was a response to rocket attacks when a ceasefire had been in place for months.
- Removing Israeli cluster, phosphorus and air raids.
- Removal of a scene showing the effects of Israeli phosphorus and cluster bombing on the Palestinian refugee camps in Beirut (despite being in the script for years).
- Changing the killing of an Arab child by a phosphorus attack to being targeted by a Lebanese sniper instead.
- Limiting Israeli air raids attacks as initially described in the script.
- Decreasing the number of Israeli attacks while increasing Arabic violence.
- Depicting forced child soldiering among Palestinian youth.
- The original script planned to depict the Israeli pilot humanely reacting to the Arabic victims of Israeli bombing. This was never filmed and instead changed to him reacting to an Arabic woman killed senselessly by a group of Arabic militia.
- The final scene called for Fahed, on reaching his ancestral village and lands, to conclude: "Baba... I'm home". This was changed to "Baba... I'm here".

== Critical reception ==
Zaytoun received mixed reviews, holding a 48% rating on review aggregator Rotten Tomatoes from 33 reviews, with an average rating of 5.5/10. The site's consensus states: "It has a lot on its mind, including a timely storyline with real-world significance; unfortunately, Zaytoun's reach exceeds its grasp, partly due to the presence of a miscast Stephen Dorff." On Metacritic the film has a score of 39% based on 15 reviews, indicating "generally unfavorable reviews".

Variety published a good review, suggesting it was "an accessible, briskly paced and occasionally schematic adventure". So did The Huffington Post, whose review added it was "punctuated by some outstanding performances". However, The Financial Times suggested it was "simplistic" and there was "too much diplomacy".
