= Do Not Forget Me Istanbul =

- Film poster
- Directed by: Hany Abu-Assad; Stefan Arsenijević; Aida Begić; Josefina Markarian; Eric Nazarian; Stergios Niziris; Omar Shargawi
- Starring: Ali Suliman; Hiam Abbass
- Release date: 27 July 2011 (SFF)
- Running time: 113 minutes
- Country: Turkey
- Languages: Serbian; Bosnian; Turkish; Greek; Hebrew

Do Not Forget Me Istanbul is a 2011 Greek / Turkish anthology film.

== Cast ==
- Ali Suliman - Fayiz
- Hiam Abbass
- Belçim Bilgin
- Svetozar Cvetković - Dragan
- Baki Davrak
- Mert Fırat
- Mira Furlan - Ana
