= Mitahat La'af =

Mitahat La'af (also known as Under The Nose) is a 1982 Israeli cult crime film. The film was directed by Jacob Goldwasser based on a true events. The film is about two "fresh" and full-of-ego criminals Sammy Ben-Tovim and Herzl Malul and their plan: to sneak into the Jaffa police station and steal the money in the safe. In order to set up the complicated operation, Sammy gathers the brilliant former criminal "the climbing cat" Zanna, who bribes the policeman Rahamim, who works at the station. The fourth member of the crime group is Jacob Khaguel, Herzl's boss and Zanna's old friend, who despite the fact that Sammy hates him and reject him, participates in the crew. After the courageous robbery is successfully carried out, the entire Tel Aviv's police forces are on the hunt after the criminals, including inspector Ben-Shooshan and his unit.

== Cast ==
| Actor | Role |
|---|---|
| Uri Gavriel | Sammy Ben-Tovim, hardcore Mizrahi criminal and the leader of the robbery |
| Moshe Ivgy | Herzl Malul, a drugged and Sammy's friend |
| Makram Khoury | inspector Ben-Shooshan, who is in charge of the investigation |
| Zadok Zarum | Ezra Janna, "the climbing cat", a master hand burglar and Sammy's partner |
| Jocky Arkin | Jacob Khaguel, a car dealer who joins in the crime |
| Yehudit Millo | Miriam, Sammy's girlfriend |
| Reuven Dayan | Rahamim, a cop who tells the crew the location of the safe |
| Shmuel Umani | Jaffa's Police Commander |
| Shoshana Doar | Sammy's mother |
