= Look Away (2018 film) =

2018 horror film by Assaf Bernstein

- Film poster
- Directed by: Assaf Bernstein
- Written by: Assaf Bernstein
- Produced by: Dana Lustig; Giora Kaplan; Brad Kaplan
- Starring: India Eisley; Mira Sorvino; Jason Isaacs
- Cinematography: Pedro Luque
- Edited by: Danny Rafic
- Music by: Mario Grigorov
- Production company: Buffalo Gal Pictures
- Distributed by: Vertical Entertainment
- Release date: October 12, 2018
- Running time: 103 minutes
- Country: Canada
- Language: English
- Box office: $1.1 million

Look Away is a 2018 Canadian psychological horror drama film. It tells the story of Maria, an alienated high-school student whose life is turned upside down when she switches places with her sinister mirror image. The film is written and directed by Assaf Bernstein, and stars India Eisley, Mira Sorvino and Jason Isaacs.

== Plot ==
17-year-old Maria Brennan is a timid outcast high schooler bullied by her classmate, Mark. Her only friend is Lily, whose boyfriend Sean is her secret crush. Maria's distant father Dan is a philandering plastic surgeon and an obsessive perfectionist, while her mother Amy has depression and constant nightmares.

Maria accidentally discovers a sonogram of twins. Whilst pleasuring herself in the bathroom one day, her reflection begins to move on its own, terrifying her. She attempts to talk to her parents the following morning, only to be ignored.

After dreaming of her own birth, Maria sees her reflection talking to her, calling herself "Airam." Airam is charismatic, assertive, and confident. She tells Maria she can take her sadness away.

Dan offers Maria an early birthday present; she arrives at his office only to realize the "gift" is cosmetic surgery to fix her "flaws." Crushed, she confides in Airam. Amy senses that something is wrong with Maria, but is repeatedly shut down by Dan.

Lily takes Maria for a skating lesson for the upcoming prom. However, after Maria slips and is unable to get back up, Lily simply taunts her and abandons her. Finally, she is humiliated and physically assaulted by Mark at the dance. Devastated by these events, Maria goes into the bathroom to find Airam. Their palms and lips touch, allowing them to switch places. Later, Amy has a nightmare about giving birth.

At school, Airam is visibly more confident and assertive. She reveals to everyone that Mark has been bullying her because he has a crush on her, embarrassing him. She arranges for Amy to run into her husband's mistress as a way of forcing her to acknowledge Dan's affairs and their superficial marriage. Maria, stuck in the mirror, is appalled by Airam's behavior. Airam insists she is only being honest, and tells Maria that all of the people around her must answer for their sins.

Airam lures Mark to the shower, breaks his knee and bludgeons him repeatedly. After secretly practicing figure skating alone, Airam has another lesson with Lily, who becomes intimidated by the way Airam is acting. When Airam chases Lily across the ice, Lily falls into the pavement, fatally crushing her skull. In the bathroom that evening, Maria begs to switch places, but Airam reiterates that Maria wanted Lily out of their lives. Maria asks again who she is, but Airam only replies, "You know me." Airam then seduces Sean, and the two begin an intense relationship. Airam begins living more wildly, smoking marijuana, skipping school, and drinking alcohol.

While at a motel together, Sean gets a phone call telling him the police want to speak to him and Maria. Airam refuses to go, and Sean becomes suspicious. He picks up his jacket to leave, and in a moment of impulse and fear, Airam hits him over the head with a vodka bottle, killing him. Distraught, she sits against the mirror in the bathroom and she and Maria cry together.

Amy has another dream about giving birth. It is revealed that Maria originally had a twin sister, who was murdered after birth by Dan due to her supposed physical deformities, against Amy's pleas. Airam leaves the motel and confronts Dan at the clinic after hours, pretending to be heavily intoxicated. She strips naked and demands to know if he would still love her if she were deformed. Clearly perturbed by the question, Dan finally answers, "Yes," and she slits his throat with a scalpel. As he lies dying, she cries and asks him, "Why couldn't you love me?"

Airam no longer sees Maria when she looks into the mirror. Frightened and alone, Airam returns home and crawls onto the bed next to her mother. A series of mirrored burst shots depicts Maria and Airam both lying by either side of Amy on the bed, implying that they have merged into one.

== Cast ==
- India Eisley as Maria Brennan and Airam; Maria is a social outcast who is always made fun of by her peers; Airam is Maria's reflection and deceased twin, who gives her support to handle her peer pressure and later takes her place to murder everyone who tormented Maria.
- Mira Sorvino as Amy Brennan, Maria's mother who suffers from depression
- Jason Isaacs as Dr. Dan Brennan, Maria's distant father
- Penelope Mitchell as Lily, Maria's best friend
- Harrison Gilbertson as Sean, Lily's boyfriend who is secretly Maria's crush
- John C. MacDonald as Mark, Maria's bully and tormentor
- Kristen Harris as Naomi

== Production ==
In August 2016, before filming commenced and over two years before the film was completed and released, Variety reported the production under the working title Behind the Glass. Look Away, which marked director Assaf Bernstein's first North American film, was produced by Bernstein, Giora "Gig" Kaplan, Brad Kaplan and Dana Lustig. Filming took place in Winnipeg, Manitoba.

== Release ==
The film was released on October 12, 2018.

== Response ==
=== Box office ===
Look Away grossed $1.1 million internationally, plus $13,592 in home video sales.

=== Critical reception ===
The film received generally negative reviews. On the review aggregator website Rotten Tomatoes, 15% of 13 critics' reviews are positive, with an average rating of 4.5/10. Noel Murray of the Los Angeles Times said, "the pace was too slow, and the mood too somber." There were some positive reviews, including Without Your Head's Michael J. Epstein, who said it was, "not only an absolutely worthy extension of its base, but a thematically driven joy, far denser and smarter than its teen-appeal look gives it credit for."
