= Itay Tiran =

Israeli actor

- איתי טיראן
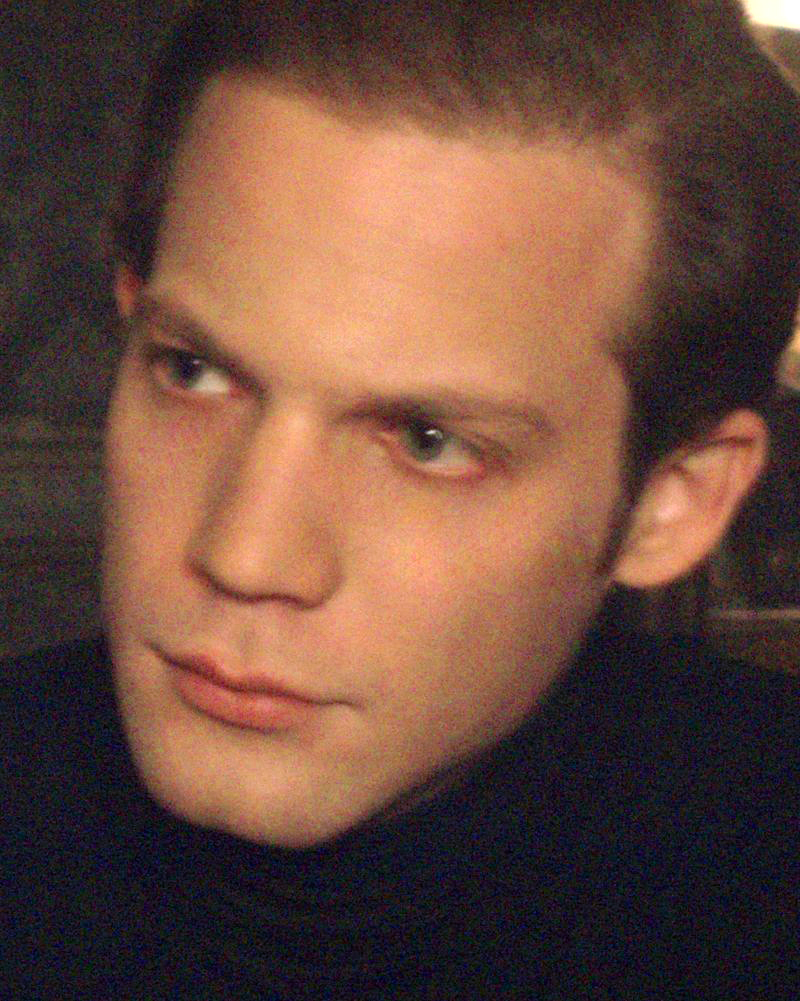
- Tiran playing in The Debt in 2007
- Born: 23 March 1980 (age 46); Petah Tikva, Israel
- Occupation: Actor
- Years active: 2003–present
- Spouse: Melanie Peres (m. 2008)

Itay Tiran (Hebrew: איתי טיראן; born March 23, 1980) is an Israeli stage and screen actor, director, and a pro-Palestinian advocate in Israel. As an actor, he is known for his roles in Forgiveness (2006), Beaufort (2007), The Debt (2007), Homeland (2008), Lebanon (2009), The Promise (2011), The Pursuit of Unhappiness (2012), The Dead and the Living (2012), Lauf, Junge, lauf (2013) and Demon.

== Early life ==
Tiran was born and raised in Petah Tikva, Israel, to an Ashkenazi Jewish family. His father Raffi is a graphics designer who emigrated from Hungary and his mother Monica is an accountant who emigrated to Israel from Sweden. His maternal grandmother Deborah survived Auschwitz. Itay is one of four boys, his youngest brother Alon Tiran is an up-and-coming Theater director. Itay studied classical piano in the Petah Tikva Municipal conservatory and later majored in music at Thelma Yellin High School of the Arts. He was exempted from conscription into the Israel Defense Forces for mental health reasons. In 1999 he enrolled in the Beit Zvi Acting School, where his talent was immediately recognized. He paid his way through school winning scholarship after scholarship. His roles as a third-year student included Mozart in Amadeus, Nero in Britannicus, King Richard in Richard II and Berger in the musical Hair.

== Theater career ==
Upon completing his studies Tiran joined the Cameri Theater in Tel Aviv. Among his parts were Eilif in Mother Courage, The King in Rumpelstiltskin, Franz Jägerstätter in Yehoshua Sobol's Eye Witness (directed by Paulus Manker), Nicolah in Caviar and Lentils, the title role in Hamlet directed by Omri Nitzan, Christian in Festen and Mozart in Amadeus. In March 2007, Itay received rave reviews from audiences and media in Washington, D.C., for his performance as Hamlet in the Tel Aviv Cameri Theater production's world tour. The "Israeli Hamlet" performed in Shanghai, Cleveland, Gdańsk, Bucharest and Moscow. In 2010, Itay played Kittel in Yehoshua Sobol's Ghetto followed by a remarkable directing debut with Georg Büchner's Woyzeck in which he also played the title role. Tiran's Woyzeck was embraced by the critiques making him a theater director to reckon with. In late 2011 the Cameri Theater's production of Cabaret featured a dark, scary MC portrayed by Itay Tiran which ultimately won him the Best Actor Award at the 2011 Israeli Theater Awards. In July 2012 the Cameri Theater staged a special project, William Shakespeare's Richard II and Richard III, directed by Arthur Kogan with Tiran in both title roles. The project was a huge critical and commercial success. Tiran's virtuosic performance abilities were awarded at the 2012 Israeli Theater Awards when he won Best Actor for Richard III. The Cameri's "Richards" Project won 7 Awards including Best Director, Best Supporting Actor, Best Play. In the summer of 2013 Tiran adapted the book Little Man, What Now? by Hans Fallada. The play, beautifully directed, earned him huge critical acclaim as a Theater Director, the paper Haaretz even called Tiran the Laurence Olivier of Israeli theater. Tiran's Woyzeck went to the Büchner Festival in Wiesbaden/Germany in the spring of 2013, opening to rave reviews. It was announced that Tiran is to play the title role in the play Cyrano de Bergerac by Edmond Rostand in late 2013. In 2019 Tiran plays the title role in Shakespeare's Othello at the Staatstheater Stuttgart

== Film career ==
Itay Tiran has played leading roles in award-winning films such as: Forgiveness, presented at the Berlin International Film Festival in 2006; Beaufort, which won the Silver Bear Award for Best Director at the Berlin International Film Festival in 2007 and was later nominated for an Oscar in the Best Foreign Language Category for 2008; and Lebanon, which won the Golden Lion Award at the 66th Venice Film Festival in 2009 and the Discovery Award at the European Film Awards in 2010. In 2011 the UK Channel 4 screened Peter Kosminsky's mini series The Promise. Tiran played Paul, an ex-soldier turned Leftist. 2012 was an interesting year for Tiran, he played Thomas Paulson a photographer with dog in the German film production of The Pursuit of Unhappiness directed by Sherry Hormann and Jocquin an Israeli photographer in the Austrian film The Dead and the Living directed by Barbara Albert.

== Personal life ==
Tiran met German-born Israeli singer and actress Melanie Peres in 2007. They were married by Udi Aloni in Shulamit Aloni's garden on October 31, 2008. They resided in Sitria.

Tiran is a radical left advocate in Israel, pro-Palestinian, and endorses the BDS movement; promoting various forms of boycott against Israel.

== Filmography ==
Itay Tiran 2008

Year	Title	Role	Director
2006	Forgiveness	David	Udi Aloni
2007	Beaufort	Koris	Joseph Cedar
2007	The Debt	Young Zvi	Assaf Bernstein
2008	Homeland	Lolek	Danny Rosenberg
2009	Lebanon	Assi	Samuel Maoz
2011	The Promise	Paul	Peter Kosminsky
2012	The Pursuit of Unhappiness	Thomas Paulson	Sherry Hormann
2012	The Dead and the Living	Jocquin	Barbara Albert
2013	Lauf, Junge, lauf	Moshe	Pepe Danquart
2015	Demon	Piotr	Marcin Wrona
2026	Wild, Wild East	TBA	Jan Holoubek

== Awards and scholarships ==
His performances have gained him various awards and nominations in Israeli theater and film, winning the award for Most Promising Actor in Israel Theater in 2003, Best Actor in 2005 for his performance as Hamlet in the Israeli Cameri Theater production of the Shakespeare play; Best Supporting Actor for his role as Wolfgang Amadeus Mozart in Amadeus at the 2009 Israel Theater Awards. Itay was nominated for Best Actor at the Israeli Film Academy Awards for his roles in Forgiveness and The Debt. In 2009 Tiran collaborated with world-renowned German conductor Kurt Masur in Mendelssohn's Midsummer Night's Dream. They performed together with the Israel Philharmonic Orchestra in Tel Aviv moving on to Paris to perform with the Orchestre National de France at the St. Denis Festival and at the Musée d'Orsay. In 2009 Tiran joined the Gropius Ensemble, formed by young conductor Daniel Cohen combining modern classical music and theatrical elements, performing pieces like Kafka's Kofadam and A Soldier's Tale by Stravinsky. Tiran's directing debut (2010) with Georg Büchner's Woyzeck in which he also played the title role, earned him a well-deserved critical acclaim as a theater director. In March 2011 Tiran and Kurt Masur met again, this time in the Davis Symphony Hall of San Francisco together with the San Francisco Symphony for the performance of A Midsummer Night's Dream. The San Francisco Chronicle called Tiran's impersonations "relevant and virtuosic".

Year	Group	Award	Result	Film/Show
	AICF scholarship	The Tsvi Clear Prize for Excellence in Studies	Won	Eye Witness
	from the Mayor of Tel Aviv	The Abraham Ben Yosef Award	Won	
	Excellence in the Performing Arts	The Gottlieb & Hanna Rosenblum Award	Won	
2003	Israeli Theater Awards	Most Promising Actor	Won	Eye Witness
	Edna Flidel	Scholarship	Won	Hamlet
2005	Israeli Theater Awards	Best Actor	Won	Hamlet
2006	Israeli Film Academy Awards	Best Actor	Nominated	Forgiveness
2007	Israeli Theater Awards	Best Supporting Role	Won	A Flea in her Ear
2007	Israeli Film Academy Awards	Best Actor	Nominated	The Debt
2008	Israeli Theater Awards	Best Actor	Nominated	Festen
2009	Israeli Theater Awards	Best Supporting Role	Won	Amadeus
2011	Israeli Theater Awards	Best Actor	Won	Cabaret
2012	Israeli Theater Awards	Best Actor	Won	Richard III
