= List of Hostages (Israeli TV series) episodes =

Hostages (Hebrew: בני ערובה; Bnei Aruba) is an Israeli drama television series that was first broadcast on Channel 10 in October 2013. The series was created by Rotem Shamir and Omri Givon and produced by Chaim Sharir.

== Series overview ==
Season	Episodes	Originally released		
Season	Episodes	First released	Last released	Network
1	10	October 13, 2013	December 15, 2013	Channel 10, Canal+
2	12	February 9, 2016	April 20, 2016	Channel 10, Canal+

== Episodes ==
=== Season 1 (2015) ===
Four masked men break into the Danon family home taking them hostage.
The mysteriously masked men demand that Yael, the matriarch of this family and surgeon, kill the prime minister in what’s meant to be a routine surgery.
The clock is ticking with the operation scheduled for the following day and if the Prime Minister is not dead, her family will be.

No. overall	No. in season	Title	Directed by	Written by	Original release date
1	1	"Episode 1"	Rotem Shamir, Omri Givon	Rotem Shamir, Omri Givon	October 13, 2013
Yael, a surgeon, is scheduled to operate on Prime Minister Shmuel Netzer tomorrow morning. Four masked men take control of her home and family and order Yael to kill the Prime Minister on the operating table tomorrow, or they will kill her family. When the lead kidnapper removes his mask, we discover Adam Rubin, a counter-terrorist unit officer.
2	2	"Episode 2"	Rotem Shamir, Omri Givon	Rotem Shamir, Omri Givon	October 20, 2013
Yael tries to change the horrible situation and slips the Prime Minister a pill to disrupt his system and delays the surgery for a limited time. Noa, her teenage daughter, discovers that she's pregnant while her son Assaf continues selling exams over the internet from the school his father manages. Adam discovers what Yael has done and makes it clear to her that if she goes against him one more time, the next to die will be one of her children.
3	3	"Episode 3"	Rotem Shamir, Omri Givon	Rotem Shamir, Omri Givon	October 27, 2013
Adam threatens Yael that if the surgery doesn't take place soon, something bad will happen to her family. She succeeds in setting the surgery to take place in four days time. Noa suffers from morning sickness but doesn't reveal why. The kidnappers discover that Yael's husband Eyal is being threatened by mafiosos to whom he owes $25000. Eyal partially repays his debt and obtains a handgun from one of the mobsters. Yael threatens her boss that she will reveal his infidelities when he discovers that she disrupted the surgery. Disagreements begin between the kidnappers due to the operational delay.
4	4	"Episode 4"	Rotem Shamir, Omri Givon	Rotem Shamir, Omri Givon	November 3, 2013
Adam gets a phone call from someone warning him that their plot has been discovered, and he sets off to clean up anything outside that might tie them to the kidnapping. Kidnappers Alex and Ella begin to suspect that Adam is hiding information from them. The family fails in an attempt to escape under the cover of darkness. Yonatan, Noa's soldier boyfriend, manages to infiltrate the house, but is overpowered by the kidnappers during a struggle, causing a firearm to accidentally discharge a bullet, striking Eyal in the chest as his family looks on in horror.
5	5	"Episode 5"	Rotem Shamir, Omri Givon	Rotem Shamir, Omri Givon	November 10, 2013
Yael takes care of the wounded Eyal whose condition quickly deteriorates, and manages to save his life after Adam refuses to allow him to be taken to the hospital. Yael manages to gather information about Adam through a cell phone she secretly acquires. Adam succeeds in getting rid of the policemen who come to the house and beats Alex for abusing Yonatan. The tension between the family members grows. Ella goes out to buy medical supplies and makes contact with her mysterious operator who demands the Prime Minister be killed. During Eyal's treatment, there is a moment of intimacy between Adam and Yael.
6	6	"Episode 6"	Rotem Shamir, Omri Givon	Rotem Shamir, Omri Givon	November 17, 2013
Eyal develops an infection and Yael leaves the house to go to the hospital and retrieve the antibiotics needed to save his life. She takes advantage of the trip to locate the address of Adam Rubin. She infiltrates his home and discovers medical documents in the name of Neta Rubin, Adam's wife. Guy, the fourth kidnapper, accidentally divulges to the shocked Yonatan that his teenage girlfriend Noa is pregnant with their child. Ella and Assaf develop an understanding between them, and he decodes a computer file for her, the contents revealed to be old security camera footage of a rape by an unknown assailant.
7	7	"Episode 7"	Rotem Shamir, Omri Givon	Rotem Shamir, Omri Givon	November 24, 2013
In the hospital, Yael discovers that Neta Rubin's medical file has recently been deleted from hospital records. Yael returns home and refuses Yonatan's proposal to escape from the home that night. When she finds out that Eyal lost their home and life savings due to bad stock investments and made it possible for the kidnappers to enter the house for money, she changes her mind and lets Yonatan escape with her children. She asks Noa to get in touch with the Prime Minister's head of security, Giora. Alex and Guy set out to try and find the escapees in the woods.
8	8	"Episode 8"	Rotem Shamir, Omri Givon	Rotem Shamir, Omri Givon	December 1, 2013
Alex and Guy chase Noa, Assaf and Yonatan in the woods near the house. Assaf falters and is caught. Yonatan is hit by a passing car trying to cross the road. Noa manages to evade the kidnappers and contacts Giora who picks her up at a gas station in his car. Adam and Yael go to the hospital where the wounded Yonatan was taken. Giora drugs Noa when she discovers he is connected to the kidnappers.
9	9	"Episode 9"	Rotem Shamir, Omri Givon	Rotem Shamir, Omri Givon	December 8, 2013
Adam arrives at the meeting point with Giora, and Noa tries to run away. Adam prevents Giora from hurting her and takes her home. Alex takes control of the house, shoots Guy and manages to overpower Adam too. At the hospital, Yael sneaks out of Yonatan's surgery and finds the security camera tapes of a morgue employee who was the one that deleted Neta Rubin's file. Yael follows him to a small apartment where she finds Neta Rubin, Adam's wife, on a stretcher dying from leukemia.
10	10	"Episode 10"	Rotem Shamir, Omri Givon	Rotem Shamir, Omri Givon	December 15, 2013
Adam, Guy, Assaf, Noa, and Eyal are tied up. Alex controls the house, but Ella shoots him and releases Adam's hands. Yael informs Adam that she is at his wife's bedside and demands that he leave her house. Adam breaks down and releases the family. Their operator demands that Giora complete the assassination mission. Yael watches the rape clip that Assaf copied onto his computer while Ella wasn't looking, and discovers that the rapist is actually the Prime Minister as a much younger man, and that he is Neta's biological father. She understands that Adam needs the Prime Minister for his bone marrow to save his wife. Yael decides to save Neta and allows Prime Minister Netzer to 'die' in surgery.

=== Season 2 (2016) ===
Adam Rubin finds himself in the midst of a hostage situation, but this time it is him surrounded by large police forces, among them some of his best friends.
Adam is stuck with the Prime Minister in an abandoned yeshiva building on the outskirts of Jerusalem. His wife's medical condition is deteriorating, and he has to get out of there to save her life. He has no plan of action, and every moment passing sinks him deeper into quicksand. Even if he manages to extricate them from the trouble they're in, he will discover that the real troubles await him outside.

No. overall	No. in season	Title	Directed by	Written by	Original release date
11	1	"Episode 1"	Rotem Shamir, Omri Givon	Rotem Shamir, Omri Givon	February 9, 2016
Adam, Guy, Sarah and Zion prepare to leave the country with the Prime Minister in order to conduct Neta's bone marrow transplant. Giora discovers their whereabouts, and after a harrowing shooting battle, Adam and his group find themselves under siege in an abandoned building, surrounded by police forces.
12	2	"Episode 2"	Rotem Shamir, Omri Givon	Rotem Shamir, Omri Givon	February 9, 2016
Large police forces commanded by Amsalem, Adam's best friend, surround the Yeshiva building where Adam and the group are ensconced. Adam realizes he's stuck and there's no way out. Now he has to find a way to prevent the police from breaking in.
13	3	"Episode 3"	Rotem Shamir, Omri Givon	Rotem Shamir, Omri Givon	February 16, 2016
Neta's medical condition continues to deteriorate. Adam decides to conduct the bone marrow transplant within the yeshiva building. He asks Orna, the negotiator, to release a mysterious prisoner named Stanislav Kogan. Orna demands the release of a hostage in return.
14	4	"Episode 4"	Rotem Shamir, Omri Givon	Rotem Shamir, Omri Givon	February 23, 2016
Stanislav begins the process of transplanting Neta with the Prime Minister's bone marrow. Guy comes to realize that Giora is the person who killed his father. Zohar from the Secret Service suspects that Moni was not just killed accidentally. Zinger receives a surprise visit from Ben, Lydia's emissary. Guy threatens to kill Giora.
15	5	"Episode 5"	Rotem Shamir, Omri Givon	Rotem Shamir, Omri Givon	March 8, 2016
Adam searches for a getaway route out of the Yeshiva. With Guy's help, he discovers a network of tunnels. Zohar is sent home from the secret service after having continued to investigate Moni's death against orders from Boaz. Adam releases Sarah from the Yeshiva as a sign of good will to the police outside.
16	6	"Episode 6"	Rotem Shamir, Omri Givon	Rotem Shamir, Omri Givon	March 15, 2016
Adam searches for a tunnel leading out through which he can extricate everyone. Amsalem also discovers the existence of the tunnels and requests permission to go in. Ben follows Sarah. Zohar breaks into Moni's office and discovers a hidden classified disk.
17	7	"Episode 7"	Rotem Shamir, Omri Givon	Rotem Shamir, Omri Givon	March 22, 2016
Adam and Amsalem confront each other in the tunnel. Ben tries to get Adam's plan out of Sarah. Zion starts losing patience and decides to leave the compound. Netser asks him to release him in return for a full pardon.
18	8	"Episode 8"	Rotem Shamir, Omri Givon	Rotem Shamir, Omri Givon	March 29, 2016
Ben sets an ultimatum for Adam – Netser for Shira. Zion discovers Sarah's death. Orna tries to reach Adam by phone and fails. She suspects something is going 9on inside the Yeshiva. Zion takes matter into his hands and releases Netser.
19	9	"Episode 9"	Rotem Shamir, Omri Givon	Rotem Shamir, Omri Givon	April 5, 2016
Arthur, a German journalist, arrives in the country to cover the Prime Minister's funeral. Adam meets with Zohar who tells him that Regent Corps has other interests beyond the gas deal. Neta threatens to kill Netser if he doesn't help her find out who is behind Shira's kidnapping.
20	10	"Episode 10"	Rotem Shamir, Omri Givon	Rotem Shamir, Omri Givon	April 12, 2016
Adam tries to get to a small notebook that Moni left for him where he hopes to find answers regarding the identity of his daughter's kidnappers. Boaz forces Zohar to meet with a psychiatrist. Adam asks two friends from the past to help him with the abduction he is planning.
21	11	"Episode 11"	Rotem Shamir, Omri Givon	Rotem Shamir, Omri Givon	April 19, 2016
Police forces are planning to break into the compound. Adam, together with Guy and Amsalem makes a complex plan to extricate the Prime Minister from inside. Arthur interviews a famous Sheik and one of the most wanted terrorists from the West Bank. Zohar escapes from the secret service offices.
22	12	"Episode 12"	Rotem Shamir, Omri Givon	Rotem Shamir, Omri Givon	April 20, 2016
The ultimatum Ben gave Adam is about to end. Zohar discovers the Regent Corps conspiracy. Orna is suspicious regarding Amsalem's involvement in the hostage situation. Adam surprises Ben, showing him that he's holding Lydia. He demands his daughter in return for her release.
