= The Debt (2007 film) =

- Theatrical poster
- החוב - HaChov
- Directed by: Assaf Bernstein
- Written by: Assaf Bernstein, Ido Rosenblum
- Produced by: Evanstone Films, Ltd.
- Starring: Gila Almagor; Yuriy Chepurnov; Oleg Drach
- Cinematography: Giora Bejach
- Edited by: Einat Glaser-Zarhin
- Music by: Jonathan Bar-Giora
- Distributed by: Tricoast Worldwide and Elephant Films (France)
- Release date: November 29, 2007
- Running time: 100 minutes
- Country: Israel
- Languages: Hebrew and German
- Budget: $900,000

Ha-Hov (Hebrew: החוב, a.k.a. HaChov), or in English, The Debt, is a 2007 Israeli drama-thriller film directed by Assaf Bernstein and starring Gila Almagor, Yuriy Chepurnov, and Oleg Drach, about three retired Mossad agents confronted by a challenge from their past.

It was remade as the 2010 American/British film The Debt, mixing the Mengele and Eichmann stories.

== Cast ==
Actors with corresponding major characters:

- Gila Almagor (as Rachel Brener)
- Yuriy Chepurnov
- Oleg Drach
- Sergiy Dvoretskyy
- Netta Garti (as young Rachel Brener)
- Evgeniya Gladiy
- Reut Hajaj
- Eran Ivanir
- Aleksandr Kulish
- Yehezkel Lazarov (as young Ehud)
- Vlad Levitskyy
- Victoria Malektorovych
- Sergei Malyuga
- Judith Naman
- Nadav Netz
- Alexander/Alex Peleg (as Zvi)
- Edgar Selge (as Max Rainer, "The Surgeon of Birkenau")
- Elena Sikorskaya
- Alexandra Smolyarova
- Dmitry Sova
- Viktor Stepanenko
- Sergiy Strelnikov
- Oded Teomi (as Ehud)
- Itay Tiran (as young Zvi)
- Alon Zamek
- Arieh Adler (narrator)

== Plot ==
The film is fictional and centers on an Israeli-Mossad Kidon team. In 1964, they capture a notorious Nazi doctor, "The Surgeon of Birkenau", who had performed human experimentation in a German extermination camp. When he escapes from them, they report him as being shot once in the head and killed during his attempted escape. In the following years, the agents receive numerous accolades for their actions, with no one suspecting the truth, but in the late 1990s they learn he may be alive, repentant, and likely to expose the truth of the events.

== Cinematic history ==
The film was nominated for four awards by the Israeli Film Academy in 2007: Best Art Direction, Ido Dolev; Best Cinematography, Giora Bejach; Best Costumes, Inbal Shuki; and Best Supporting Actress, Neta Garty.

The film has had no theatrical release in United States as of February 2011, but a version with English subtitles has screened at U.S. film festivals and has been shown on the Sundance cable television channel.

A U.S. remake titled The Debt starring Helen Mirren, Sam Worthington, Ciarán Hinds and Tom Wilkinson was directed by John Madden from a screenplay by Matthew Vaughn, Jane Goldman and Peter Straughan. It premiered at the Deauville American Film Festival on September 4, 2010, and was originally scheduled for wide release in December 2010 until this date was pushed back to August 31, 2011.
