= Laces (film) =

2018 film

- Film poster
- Directed by: Jacob Goldwasser
- Written by: Haim Merin
- Starring: Doval'e Glickman
- Release date: 18 July 2018
- Running time: 98 minutes
- Country: Israel
- Language: Hebrew

Laces is a 2018 Israeli drama film directed by Jacob Goldwasser, dealing with special needs acceptance. In July 2018, it was one of five films nominated for the Ophir Award for Best Picture.

== Cast ==
- Doval'e Glickman as Ruven
- Evelin Hagoel as Ilana
- Nevo Kimchi as Gadi
- Yafit Asulin as Rita
- Dror Keren as Yehuda
