= List of Israeli films of the 2000s =

A list of films produced in Israel in the 2000s.

== Overview ==
The 2000s (decade) has brought a prosperous era to Israeli cinema, both for drama and documentary. The Israeli cinema audience grew, critics praised more films, and several Israeli films gained respect and won awards in film festivals around the world. This success could be ascribed to the significant improvement in the quality of the films, a decrease in overtly political emphasis, and to an increased funding from both the state and television industry. The Israeli commercial TV channels (Channel 2, Cable television and Satellite television) were contractually obliged to fund cinematic film productions in exchange for their future broadcasting rights. Furthermore, royalties which the television companies once paid to the government now go to the Israeli cinema industry.

Among the most prominent films of this period: Late Marriage (Dover Koshashvili), Broken Wings (Nir Bergman), Walk on Water and Yossi & Jagger (Eytan Fox), Nina's Tragedies (Savi Gavison), Campfire and Beaufort (Joseph Cedar), Or (My Treasure) (Keren Yedaya), Turn Left at the End of the World (Avi Nesher), Noodle (Ayelet Menahemi), The Band's Visit (Eran Kolirin), Waltz With Bashir (Ari Folman) and Ajami (Scandar Kobti and Yaron Sheni) .

== See also ==
- Cinema of Israel
