= Jacob Goldwasser =

Israeli film director (1950–2026)

- יעקב גולדווסר
- Born: 11 September 1950; Tel Aviv, Israel
- Died: 24 September 2026 (aged 76)
- Occupation: Film director
- Spouse: Mira
- Children: Itamar Goldwasser, Uri
- Awards: Ophir Award (best director)

Jacob Goldwasser (Hebrew: יעקב גולדווסר; 11 September 1950 – 24 September 2026) was an Israeli filmmaker and a board member of the Israeli Academy of Film and Television.

Goldwasser was involved in teaching film and directing. He taught at Beit Berl, Bezalel, Tel Aviv University, the Sam Spiegel Film School, and other institutions. Goldwasser died on 24 September 2026, at the age of 76.

== Filmography ==
=== Director of feature films ===
Year	English title	Original title	Notes
1982	Mitahat La'af	מתחת לאף	
1987	Abba Ganuv	אבא גנוב	
1991	Beyond the Sea	מעבר לים	Won the Ophir Award for Best Film
1994	Max and Morris	מקס ומוריס	
2007	She's Got It	אין לה אלוהים	
2018	Laces	שרוכים	

=== Producer of feature film ===
Year	English title	Original title	Notes
1980	Transit	טרנזיט	
