= Assaf Bernstein =

Israeli screenwriter, film director and film producer

- אסף ברנשטיין
- Born: July 7, 1970 (age 56); Tel Aviv, Israel
- Occupations: Screenwriter; Film director; Film producer
- Years active: 1995–present
- Spouse: Michal Bernstein
- Children: 3

Assaf Bernstein (Hebrew: אסף ברנשטיין; born 8 July 1970) is an Israeli screenwriter, film director and film producer.

== Life and works ==
Bernstein was born in Israel and graduated cum laude from NYU Film School.

Bernstein began his film career with two documentary short subjects, "It Belongs to the Bank" (1999), a "social documentary," which follows a woman bailiff's journey through Arab villages and urban slums as she seizes property from Israel's poor; and "Holy for Me" (1995), a "spoof" on tours, guides, and visits to the holy sites of Jerusalem, which won the 1995 Best Short Film award at the Jerusalem Film Festival.

In 2007, Bernstein directed the 2007 film The Debt (Hebrew: HaChov or HaHov), starring Gila Almagor. The movie is about three former Israeli Mossad agents who must confront a secret from their past. Bernstein also wrote and co-produced the film, and later helped write the 2010 U.S. English-language remake, also titled The Debt and starring Oscar-winning actresses Jessica Chastain and Helen Mirren.

In 2012 Bernstein directed The series Allenby Street, which debuted in 2012, follows the story of a nightclub on Tel Aviv's Allenby Street, and one of the strippers, portrayed by Moran Atias, working in it. The series is based on the best-selling novel "Allenby Street," by Gadi Taub

Bernstein also directed and served as showrunner for the complete first season of the internationally acclaimed television series Fauda. The series is distributed by the online streaming service Netflix, billed as a Netflix original program, and premiered on 2 December 2016. In 2016, the show took six awards, including Best Drama Series, at the Israeli Academy Awards. In December 2017, The New York Times voted Fauda the best international show of 2017, calling it, "The grittiest, tightest, most lived-in thrillers come from Israel." In 2018, the show took 11 Israeli TV Academy Awards, including best TV drama, best actor for Lior Raz and also best screenplay, casting, cinematography, recording, special effects and in other categories.

In 2018 he wrote and directed the film Look Away starring India Eisley, Mira Sorvino and Jason Isaacs. Look Away is a psychological thriller that tells the story of Maria, an alienated high-school student whose life is turned upside down when she switches places with her sinister mirror image.

Bernstein is currently working on a film adaptation of Stephen King's Rose Madder.

== Filmography ==
Year	Title	Director	Writer	Producer
1995	Holy for Me	Yes	No	No
1999	It Belongs to the Bank	Yes	No	No
2007	The Debt	Yes	Yes	Yes
2010	The Debt	No	Yes	No
2012	Allenby St. (TV Series)	Yes	No	No
2015	Fauda	Yes	No	No
2018	Look Away	Yes	Yes	No
2019	Warrior (Pilot)	Yes	No	No
