= Eran Riklis =

Israeli filmmaker (born 1954)

- ערן ריקליס
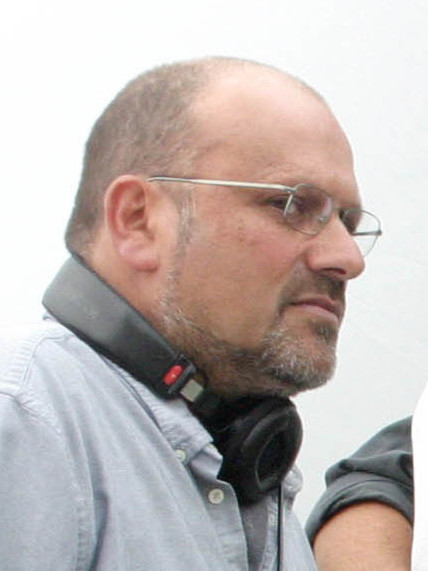
- Riklis in 2003
- Born: October 2, 1954 (age 71)
- Occupation: Film director
- Spouse: Dina Riklis
- Children: Tammy and Jonathan

Eran Riklis (Hebrew: ערן ריקליס; born October 2, 1954) is an Israeli filmmaker. His films include Cup Final (1991), The Syrian Bride (2004), Lemon Tree (2008) and Dancing Arabs (also known as A Borrowed Identity) (2014).

== Early life ==
Riklis was born in Israel in 1954 and lived in Montreal and New York City until he was six, when the family returned to Israel. He served in the Israel Defense Forces during the Yom Kippur War in 1973 and went to university in Tel Aviv. He graduated from the National Film and Television School in England in 1984, the first Israeli to do so.

== Professional career ==
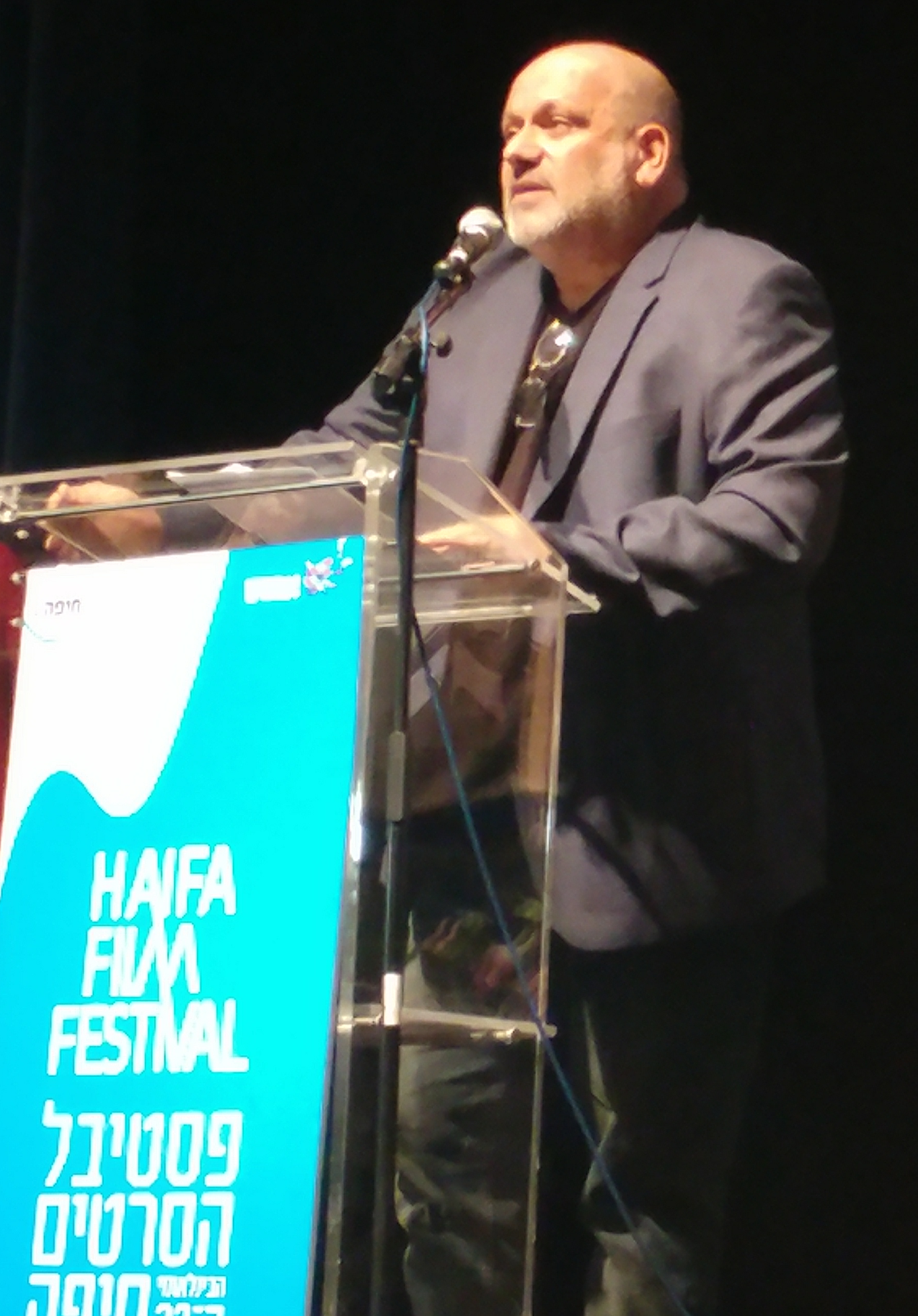
Riklis in 2017

His first film was the political thriller, On a Clear Day You Can See Damascus (1984). His 1991 film Cup Final (Gmar gavi'a) was entered into the Venice International Film Festival (1991), Berlin (1992) and many others.

In 1993, he made the film Zohar, the biggest box office success for an Israeli film in the 1990s, followed by several TV series and by the film Vulcan Junction (1999), which won the Best Film award at the Haifa International Film Festival. In 2004, his film The Syrian Bride, achieved wide international success and won awards including four awards at the Montreal World Film Festival and the Audience Award at the Locarno International Film Festival. In 2008, Lemon Tree won the Audience Award at the Berlin and San Sebastian International Film Festivals and was released globally to critical and commercial success. He and Suha Arraf received the award for Best Screenplay at the 2008 Asia Pacific Screen Awards for Lemon Tree.

His 2010 film The Human Resources Manager, was selected as the Israeli entry for the Best Foreign Language Film at the 83rd Academy Awards, but it didn't make the final shortlist. The film also won the Audience Award again for Riklis at the Locarno film festival (2010).

His adventure thriller film Zaytoun, premiered at the 2012 Toronto International Film Festival and in London as well as many other festivals. It was followed by Dancing Arabs (aka A Borrowed Identity), presented at the Telluride Film Festival, Locarno and many others.

Riklis's 2017 film Shelter, previously titled Refuge, is a spy thriller set mostly in Hamburg. His film, Spider in the Web (2019), starred Ben Kingsley, Monica Bellucci, Itay Tiran and Itzik Cohen. In 2024 he released Reading Lolita in Tehran (film), filmed with a cast of exiled Iranian actors and based on the book by Azar Nafisi.

== Personal life ==
He is married to Dina Riklis and they have two children, a daughter, Tammy, and a son, Jonathan. The family lives in Tel Aviv.

== Filmography ==
- 1984: On a Clear Day You Can See Damascus (Hebrew page)
- 1991: Cup Final
- 1993: Zohar (Hebrew page)
- 1999: Borders
- 1999: Volcano Junction (Hebrew page)
- 2002: Temptation (Hebrew page)
- 2004: The Syrian Bride
- 2008: Lemon Tree
- 2010: The Human Resources Manager
- 2011: Playoff
- 2012: Zaytoun
- 2014: A Borrowed Identity (Dancing Arabs)
- 2017: Shelter (Hebrew page)
- 2019: Spider in the Web
- 2024: Reading Lolita in Tehran (Hebrew page)

== See also ==
- Cinema of Israel
