= Jonah Lotan =

Israeli actor (born 1973)

- יאיר לוטן
- Born: Yair Zlotogorsky; July 3, 1973 (age 53); Jerusalem, Israel
- Occupation: Actor
- Years active: 1997-present
- Military career
- Allegiance: Israel
- Branch: Israel Defense Forces

Yair "Jonah" Lotan (Hebrew: יאיר לוטן; born July 3, 1973) is an Israeli actor best known for appearing in Hostages, Foyle's War and 24.

== Early life and education ==
Lotan was born Yair Zlotogorsky in Jerusalem, Israel, on July 3, 1973, and grew up in Jerusalem and the U.S. state of New York. His family returned to live in Jerusalem when he was twelve years old and he attended Hebrew University Secondary School. His father is a psychologist and his mother is a physician. He served for three years in the Israeli Defense Forces during the 1990s. In his early 20s, he embarked on a modelling career and appeared as a host of children's shows on Channel 1. He graduated with a degree in cinema from Tel Aviv University. Lotan then moved to London to pursue a master's degree at the London Academy of Music and Dramatic Art.

== Career ==
Lotan starred as Joe Farnetti in the British TV detective drama, Foyle's War on ITV. He stated that his character reminded him of a friend in the military who had an ability to see humor in any given situation.

He voiced the lead role in the 2001 video game Operation Flashpoint: Cold War Crisis, as David Armstrong, a U.S. Army soldier serving in the Cold War. He appeared in the 2001 film Swimming Pool as Chris, played Kenny in the 2004 television series NY-LON, and acted next to Keira Knightley as an intern in 2005 film, The Jacket. Lotan also had a role in the fifth season of 24, as Spenser Wolff, and appeared in four episodes of CSI: NY as Marty Pino, a doctor/serial-killer.

Lotan starred in the 2006 religious epic film, One Night with the King. He played Jesse, a childhood friend of Hadassah, the main protagonist, before she became Esther. The film debuted in the top 10 of the US Box Office.

He also appeared in the 2006 television film, The Beyond, centering on NASA scientists at a jet propulsion laboratory during a global crisis. Lotan was also in the 2008 HBO historical war drama Generation Kill, as Robert Timothy Bryan, a U.S. Navy corpsman. He was also cast for the lead role in David Milch's HBO pilot Last of the Ninth.

In 2012, he appeared in the second season of Showtime alongside Mandy Patinkin in the espionage thriller series, Homeland.

Between 2013 to 2016, he starred as the protagonist, Adam Rubin, of the Israeli hostage drama series, Hostages on Channel 10. The series was broadcast by the BBC in the United Kingdom.

In September 2017, Yair Jonah Lotan appeared as Joel Singer in the play Oslo by J. T. Rogers at Royal National Theatre's Lyttelton Stage. The production was scheduled to transfer to the West End Harold Pinter Theatre in October 2017.

== Personal life ==
Lotan was previously engaged to the British actress, Kelly Reilly.

== Filmography ==
| Year | Title | Role | Other notes |
|---|---|---|---|
| 1997 | Itha L'Netza | | Film (as Yair Lotan) |
| 1997 | Kachol Amok | Rif | TV |
| 1998 | Domino | Yuval | TV |
| 1998 | Joice | | T.V. (as Yair Lotan) |
| 2001 | Swimming Pool | Chris | Film |
| 2001 | Operation Flashpoint: Cold War Crisis | David Armstrong | Computer game |
| 2002 | Relic Hunter | Tobar | TV |
| 2002 | Bnot Brown | Yuval Kraus | Mini-series |
| 2004 | NY-LON | Kenny | TV |
| 2005 | The Jacket | Intern #1 | Film |
| 2005 | The Festival | Rick | Film |
| 2005 | The Tiger and the Snow | American soldier | Film |
| 2006 | Beyond | Matterhorn T. Gooley | TV |
| 2006 | Foyle's War | Joe Farnetti | TV |
| 2006 | 24 | Spenser Wolff | TV |
| 2005-2009 | CSI: NY | Dr. Marty Pino | TV |
| 2006 | One Night with the King | Jesse | Film |
| 2008 | Generation Kill | HM2 Robert Timothy 'Doc' Bryan, U.S.N. | Mini-series |
| 2009 | Last of the Ninth | Joe Dalton | TV |
| 2012 | Homeland | Rudy McCoy | TV |
| 2013-2016 | Hostages | Adam Rubin | TV |
| 2017 | Fearless | Logan Bradley | TV |
| 2023 | Nobody's Shadow | | Short film |
