= Udi Aloni =

Israeli filmmaker, writer and artist

- אודי אלוני
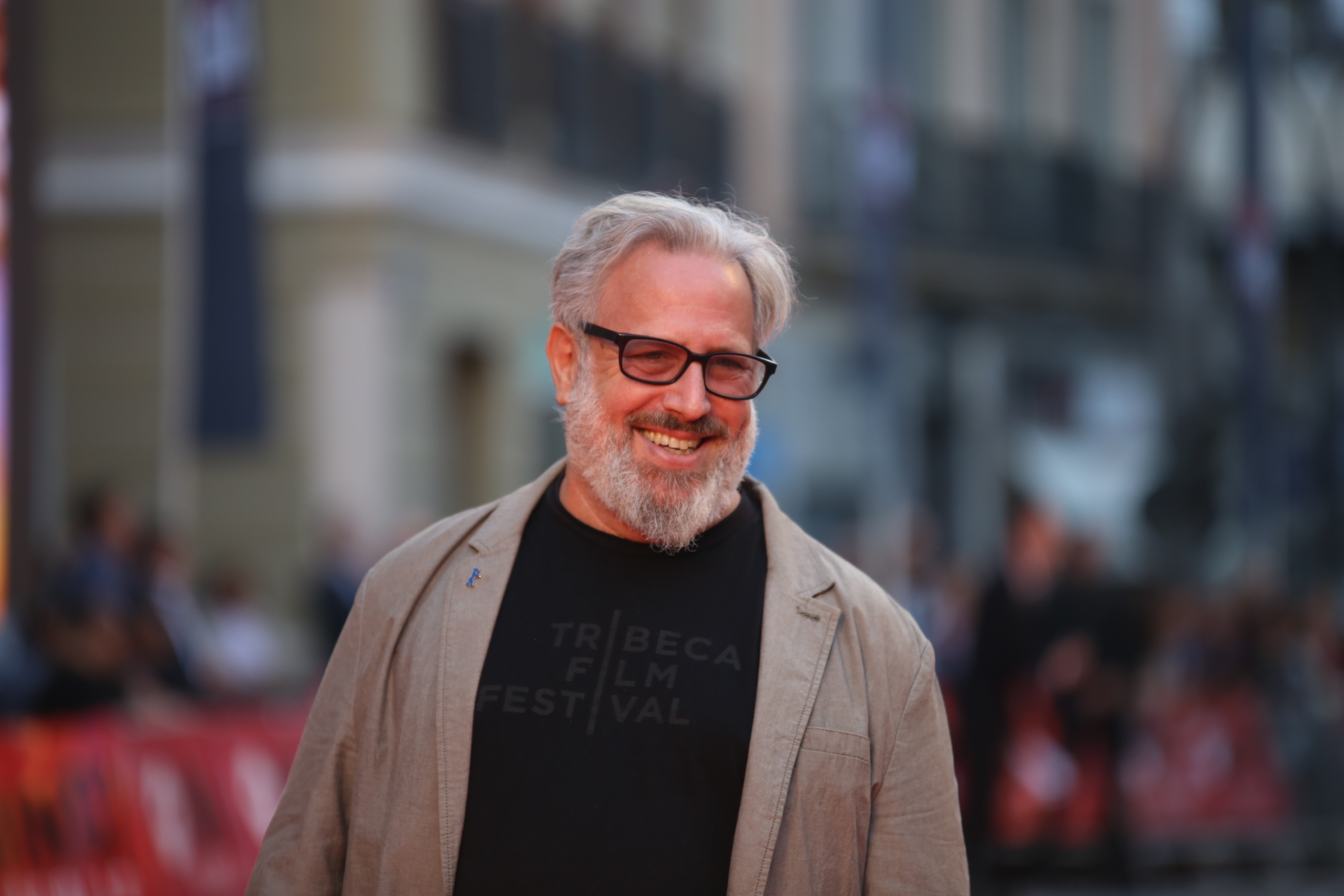
- Born: 10 December 1959 (age 66); Israel
- Occupations: Filmmaker, writer

Udi Aloni (Hebrew: אודי אלוני; born December 10, 1959) is an Israeli American filmmaker, writer, visual artist and political activist whose works focus on the interrelationships between art, theory, and action.

== Biography ==
Udi Aloni is the son of Reuven and Shulamit Aloni. He has two brothers: Dror Aloni, who served as mayor of Kfar Shmaryahu and head of Herzliya Hebrew Gymnasium, and Nimrod Aloni, an educational philosopher. He was married to Sigal Primor with whom he has a daughter, Yuli.

== Art career ==
Aloni began his career as a painter, establishing the Bugrashov gallery in Tel Aviv, a home for contemporary art, cultural and political events. While living in New York in the 1990s, his work in large-scale art led him to invent a method for advertising on urban architectural structures.

== Filmmaking career ==
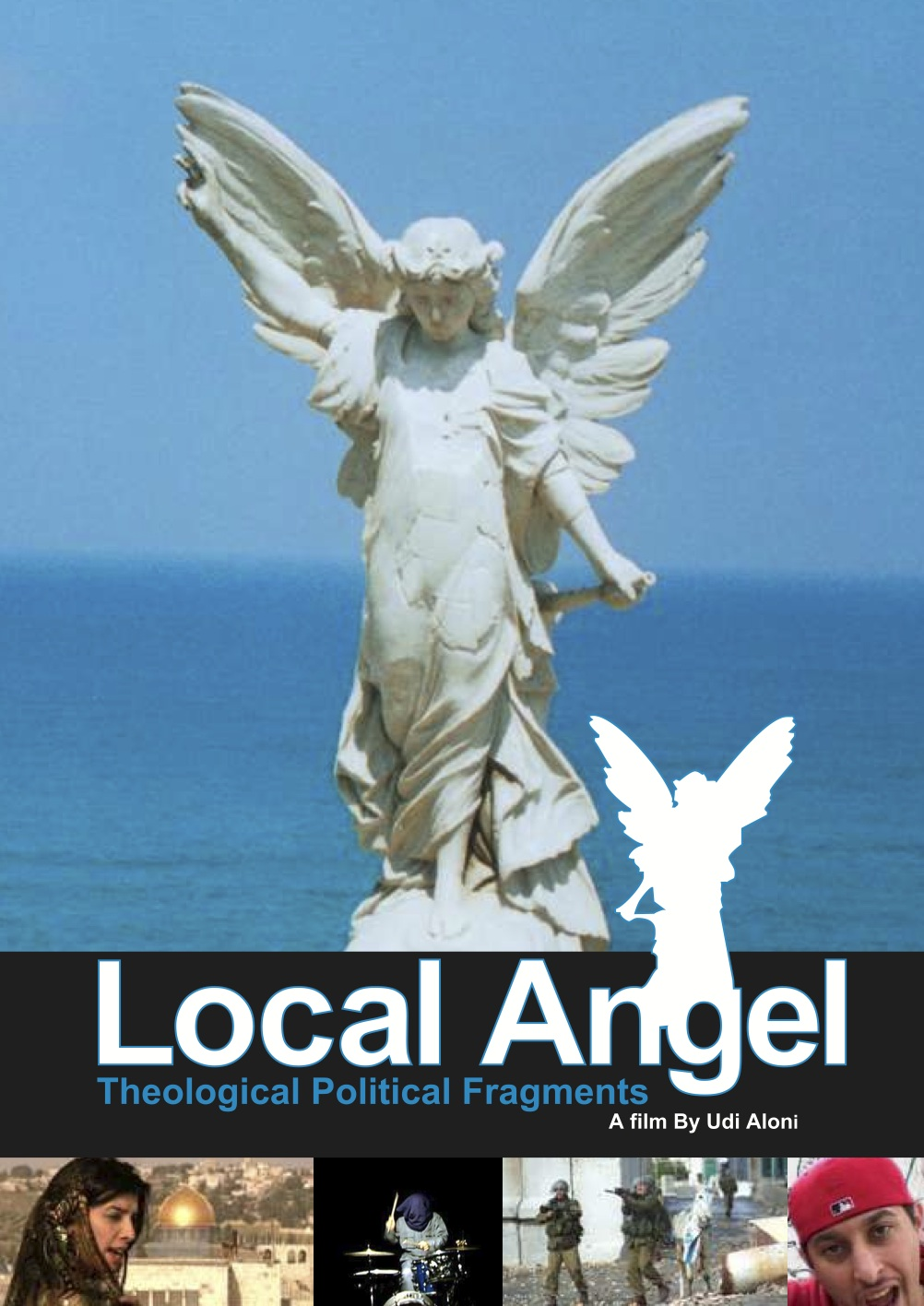
Local Angel

In 1996, Aloni began making films. His documentary, Local Angel (2002), and his first feature-length fiction, Forgiveness (2006), are both radical interpretations of the Israeli–Palestinian conflict that have stirred controversy in the Middle East and internationally. Aloni also directed Kashmir: Journey to Freedom (2008), a documentary about the nonviolent movement for liberation and freedom in Jammu and Kashmir that opened in the Berlin International Film Festival. Other films include Left (1996) and Art/Violence (2013), as well as Innocent Criminals (2004), a music video with DAM, Palestinian rap group.

Aloni directed and produced Junction 48, co-written by Oren Moverman and its star Tamer Nafar.

Aloni was the head cinema coach in the Freedom Theatre of the Jenin Refugee Camp. After the 2011 murder of Juliano Mer Khamis, the founder and head of The Freedom Theater, Aloni directed an Arabic adaptation of Waiting for Godot with the Freedom Theatre's graduate students, a production that toured to New York.

Aloni wrote, directed, and produced the documentary Why Is We Americans?, focused on famed poet and activist Amiri Baraka and his son, Newark Mayor Ras Baraka. The documentary was co-directed by Ayana Stafford-Morris, and features narration from executive producer Lauryn Hill. For the theme song of the documentary, "What We Want," Aloni produced a music video directed by Stafford-Morris, with Mayor Baraka delivering a passionate message of equality and justice.

=== Reception ===
Aloni's films have been presented at the Berlin International Film Festival, the Toronto International Film Festival, the Tokyo International Film Festival, the Buenos Aires International Festival of Independent Cinema, and the Jerusalem Film Festival. Forgiveness (2006), which took the audience award at the Woodstock Film Festival in 2006, was described by Slavoj Žižek as "maybe the most beautiful, powerful and important film ever made about the tragedies of the region." Its theatrical release in the United States opened with Mariam Said, the widow of late Edward Said, reading the poetry of Mahmoud Darwish.

In 2007, Aloni was a Jury Member for the Manfred Salzgeber Award in the Panorama section of the Berlin International Film Festival in Berlin, Germany. His film Junction 48 received the Panorama audience award at the 2016 Berlin Film Festival. It received the Best International Narrative Feature award at the 2016 Tribeca Film Festival.

Some of Aloni's films have drawn sharp criticism. Jerusalem Post movie critic Hannah Brown wrote of Aloni's film Forgiveness, "There isn't an award for the most pretentious and annoying movie ever made, but if there were, I'd put my money on Forgiveness. Writer/director Udi Aloni really does deserve some kind of prize for the energy with which he has melded tired cliches, smug pseudo-intellectualism and humorless far left-wing politics into a single movie."

The film Forgiveness (2006), which had its Middle-Eastern premiere in Ramallah, recently stirred up controversy when the Israeli embassy in Paris threatened to withdraw funding from the Israeli Film Festival in Paris (Israelien de Paris) should they open the festival with the film. Aloni (along with Naomi Klein, John Greyson, and others) was an initiator of the Toronto Declaration, a petition to protest plans to "host a celebratory spotlight on Tel Aviv" because according to the petitioners doing so constitutes "staging a propaganda campaign" on behalf of "an apartheid regime.".

== Published works ==
Aloni's book, What Does a Jew Want?: On Binationalism and Other Specters (Columbia University Press, 2011), includes conversations and comments by French philosopher Alain Badiou, philosophy professor Judith Butler, and philosopher Slavoj Žižek. The book spans the fields of theology and psychoanalysis, literature and philosophy.

Aloni's book Gilgul Mechilot (Forgiveness, Or Rolling In the Underworld's Tunnels), a collection of stories and pensées, includes his politically charged essays Messianic Manifesto for Binationalism and Reflections on the Coming of the Messiah. Aloni coined the phrases "radical leftist Messianism" and "radical grace" to describe his political ideology, which attempts to identify and analyze the theology of secularism, or the unconscious theological underpinnings of secularist and liberal discourses, specifically in Israel. In Messianic Manifesto for Binationalism, he calls for a radical re-reading of Zionism, stating that "Any attempt to resist the Law of the Father as violent Zionist extremism only strengthens him. […] We must cleanse Zionism of its nationalistic elements without relinquishing its Messianic fervor for liberty, freedom, and equality."

== Political views ==
Aloni promotes replacing Israel with a binational state in Israel-Palestine, and he supports the BDS (Boycott, Divestment and Sanctions) movement against Israel. He accuses the current Israeli state of apartheid that "in some ways has been crueler in Israel" than in South Africa because "the entire judicial system conceals and cleanses the praxis of government-led apartheid." Aloni has described the ideology and actions of the state of Israel as racist and has called to replace what he calls the ideology of a false "Jewish democracy" with a binational state for all people from the Jordan River to the Mediterranean Sea. He supports the BDS (Boycott, Divestment and Sanctions) movement because he claims it is a means for equal dialogue and it creates a space for nonviolent resistance. He views Palestinians as a "brother ... with whom I share a common identity." and he believes that fidelity to the Israeli people and fidelity to the Palestinian people are one and the same. The slogan "From the River to the Sea all People Must be Free" appears on Aloni's website.

Aloni is a member of the advisory board of Jewish Voice for Peace, an American organization that says it "seeks an end to the Israeli occupation of the West Bank, the Gaza Strip, and East Jerusalem," and which critics say musters Jewish opposition to and works to undermine public support for Israel.

== Visual art ==
- Re-U-Man Interactive Project –inaugural presentation: Metropolitan Museum of Art; also exhibited at The Israel Museum in Jerusalem and the 22nd St. Bridge in New York
- Book of Sham: Nicole Klagsbrun Gallery, New York
- Parhessia: Ramat Gan Museum for Contemporary Art, Israel
- God Is Dead Already From the Beginning –a conference with the participation of Umberto Eco and Moshe Idel, Mishkenot Shaananim, Israel

== Filmography ==
- 1995 The Book of Sham, New York
- 1996 Left (documentary film)
- 2002 Local Angel (documentary film)
- 2004 Innocent Criminals (music video)
- 2006 Forgiveness (feature film)
- 2009 Kashmir: Journey to Freedom
- 2010-12 Antigone In The Jenin Refugee Camp
- 2011 "Waiting For Godot" with The Freedom Theater of the Jenin Refugee Camp
- 2013 Art/Violence (feature film)
- 2016 Junction 48 (feature film)
- 2020 Why Is We Americans? (documentary film)
