= Cup Final (film) =

Cup Final (גמר גביע)
- Directed by: Eran Riklis
- Written by: Eyal Halfon
- Starring: Moshe Ivgy; Mohammad Bakri
- Release dates: 20 February 1992 (Germany); 14 May 1993 (UK)
- Running time: 105 minutes
- Country: Israel
- Languages: English; Hebrew; Arabic

Cup Final (Hebrew: גמר גביע, gmar gavi'a) is a 1991 Israeli film set during the 1982 invasion of Lebanon by Israel and the 1982 FIFA World Cup.

Upon its release, the film participated in the Berlin Film Festival and the Valencia Film Festival.

== Plot ==
A young Israeli soldier, Cohen, is kidnapped by a group of Palestinian fighters who hold him as a hostage during the conflict. The 1982 FIFA World Cup happens to be on during the invasion, and their mutual love of association football, and in particular the Italy national football team, helps break down the barriers of nationalism and the historical baggage that the two bring. A kind of alliance is forged between the two men. Their relationship heads for a tragic ending as the Italian team, boosted by Paolo Rossi's goal scoring, marches toward winning the 1982 FIFA World Cup Final.

== Reception ==
Writing in The Washington Post, Hal Hinson called Cup Final "a powerful film, and yet one of the most unassuming great movies ever made". Hanson comments on the relationship between the Cohen and Ziad (the Palestinian commander) as "beautifully mismatched" and that the film's central idea that the men who fight wars would "otherwise be hanging over each other's backyard fence as true friends" was stirringly presented. Stephen Holden, in The New York Times, focuses on the similarity between Ziad and Cohen's loyalties to their team (Italy) and their equally fervent soldierly loyalties to Palestine and Israel. Holden writes that, while the film is sometimes "ham-fisted" in its eagerness to make that point, it succeeds in its depictions of warfare, the media, and in the work of the two main actors, Moshe Ivgi. who plays Cohen, the kidnapped Israeli soldier, and Muhamad Bacri, who plays Ziad, the PLO commander.

== Festivals ==
- Berlin International Film Festival (20 February 1992)
- 17th Moscow International Film Festival (1991)

== See also ==
- List of association football films
