= Glenn Kirschner =

American prosecutor and TV legal analyst

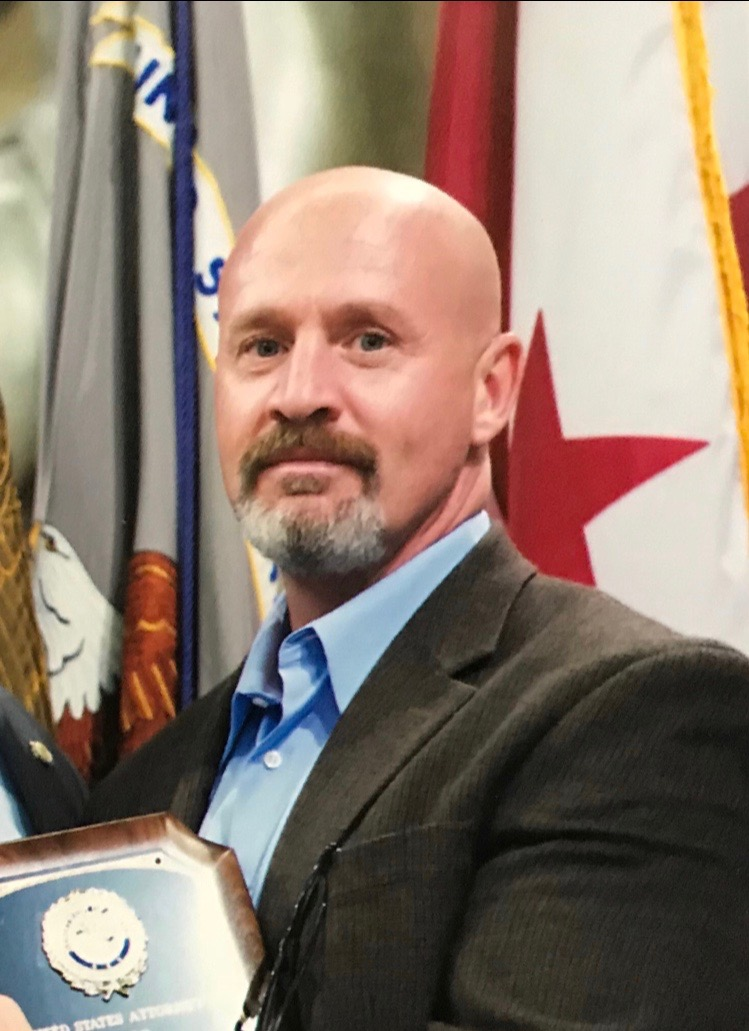
- Kirschner in 2018

Personal details
- Born: January 2, 1961 (age 65) Brooklyn, New York, U.S.
- Education: Washington and Lee University (BA); New England Law Boston (JD)
- Profession: Attorney
- Website: glennkirschner.com

Military service
- Service: United States Army
- Years of service: 1988–1994
- Rank: Captain
- Unit: U.S. Army Judge Advocate General's Corps

Glenn Louis Kirschner (born January 2, 1961) is an American attorney, a former U.S. Army prosecutor, a former assistant U.S. Attorney in the office of the United States Attorney for the District of Columbia and a former NBC News/MSNBC legal analyst.

== Early life ==
Glenn Louis Kirschner was born in Brooklyn, New York on January 2, 1961, and raised in New Jersey. He graduated from Point Pleasant Borough High School in 1979, where he wrestled and played football, and earned a U.S. Army Student Achievement Award. He then attended Washington and Lee University. While at Washington and Lee, he was awarded an Army ROTC scholarship and joined the Virginia Beta chapter of the Phi Kappa Psi fraternity. He played for the Washington and Lee Generals football team as a center on the offensive line for four seasons and was elected by his teammates as one of three team captains for his senior year. Kirschner earned Old Dominion Athletic Conference all-conference honors in his sophomore, junior and senior years and was named a first-team Kodak All-American college football player in his senior year. He was inducted into Washington and Lee University's Athletic Hall of Fame in 2009.

After graduating from Washington and Lee with a degree in journalism in 1984, Kirschner obtained an educational deferment of his military service to attend law school. While attending New England Law Boston, he earned two American Jurisprudence awards (in trial practice and wills, estates and trusts) and was designated a Board of Trustees Scholar after his second year. He received his J.D. degree cum laude in 1987 and entered active duty with the U.S. Army Judge Advocate General's Corps in January 1988.

== Career ==
Upon entering active duty as a Judge Advocate General officer, Kirschner completed his first tour as an Army prosecutor at Fort Richardson in Alaska. In that capacity, he investigated and prosecuted court-martial cases and served as legal advisor to the post's many commanding officers. After three years in that assignment, Kirschner was transferred to the U.S. Army's Legal Services Agency in Falls Church, Virginia, where he served as a government appellate attorney handling criminal appeals of court-martial convictions. These included espionage and death penalty cases.

Following more than six years of active duty service, Kirschner was honorably discharged from the Army at the rank of captain. In June 1994, he joined the United States Attorney for the District of Columbia office as an assistant U.S. Attorney.

After a few early rotational assignments, Kirschner joined the U.S. Attorney Office (USAO) Homicide Section, led at the time by Robert Mueller. Kirschner spent 24 years at the DC USAO, prosecuting lengthy RICO trials in DC Federal Court and murder/conspiracy/obstruction of justice cases in DC Superior Court. In addition to prosecuting more than 50 murder trials, Kirschner was Chief of the Homicide Section from 2004 to 2010. He retired from the US Attorney's office on June 1, 2018.

Notable cases in which Kirschner has worked include:

- U.S. v. Aundrey Burno - Motivated by a desire to steal a police officer's Glock firearm, the defendant ambushed an on-duty police officer, shooting him in the neck.
- U.S. v. Jose Rodriguez-Cruz - In 1989, EPA employee Pam Butler disappeared. In 2016, the cold case was revived, and enough evidence was developed to charge Butler's boyfriend with her murder. Although Butler's body was never found, the defendant pleaded guilty in 2017.
- U.S. v. Albrecht Muth - A controversial case involving a highly skilled conman in elite DC political circles who murdered his elderly, socialite wife, Viola Herms Drath. Kirschner tried Muth in absentia while Muth remained in his hospital bed after having starved himself into physical incapacitation. The case is the subject of a major motion picture directed by and starring Christoph Waltz titled Georgetown, which was released in April 2019.

== Film portrayal ==
In the 2019 film Georgetown, directed by Christoph Waltz, Kirschner is portrayed by Paulino Nunes in his role as the prosecutor in the Albrecht Muth case. Described by the website ComingSoon.net, Georgetown "is inspired by the true story of Albrecht Muth, who was convicted in 2011 for murdering his much older socialite wife in Washington, D.C. Based on one of the city's most sensational scandals of recent times, the film will tell the story of an unconventional love affair, an outsider striving for acceptance and the desperate struggle for significance on every level."

== Media commentary ==
For developments with the Special Counsel Bob Mueller investigation, Kirschner provided legal commentary on national news media programs such as MSNBC' s Morning Joe, MSNBC Live and Hardball with Chris Matthews, CNN's The Lead with Jake Tapper and The Stephanie Miller Show.

In mid-September 2020, Kirschner argued that President Donald Trump should be charged with manslaughter for deaths resulting from him intentionally lying to the American public about the danger posed by COVID-19 virus during the COVID pandemic.

Kirschner produces a daily legal news analysis video on his Justice Matters YouTube channel. In November 2022, Kirschner teamed up with YouTuber Brian Tyler Cohen to produce a series called Legal Breakdown, in which Cohen discusses legal topics with Kirschner, such as the former president and his political allies' legal exposure in various civil suits and criminal cases.
