= July Namir =

British-Egyptian actress (born 1995)

- Born: 20 July 1995 (age 31)
- Education: Brunel University
- Years active: 2014–present

July Namir (born 20 July 1995) is a British actress, comedian and writer. She is known for her roles in the BBC Two serial Collateral (2018) and the Channel 4 crime drama Baghdad Central (2020).

== Early life ==
Namir was born in the county of Devon to Egyptian parents. She spent her early childhood in London, Scotland, and Egypt before settling down back in South London. She completed A Levels in English Literature, Drama, and Psychology at Richmond upon Thames College. She went on to graduate from Brunel University with a dual Bachelor of Arts in English Literature and Theatre Studies. She got into acting through the drama club Footlights.

== Career ==
Upon graduating from university, Namir starred in the short film Two Seas with Ria Zmitrowicz. Namir made her television debut in 2015 with roles in the National Geographic film adaptation of Killing Jesus as young Mary and in an episode of the Showtime thriller Homeland. This was followed by a guest appearance in the Sky Atlantic crime drama The Tunnel in 2017 and the BBC One medical soap Doctors in 2018.

Also in 2018, Namir had a recurring role as Hoda Al-Hada in the 2018 Hulu miniseries The Looming Tower, an adaptation of the novel of the same name by Lawrence Wright. Namir and Ahd Kamel starred as sisters Mona and Fatima Asif respectively in the four-part BBC Two drama Collateral with Carey Mulligan and Billie Piper.

In 2020, Namir starred as Mrouj al-Khafaji in the Channel 4 adaptation of Elliot Colla's Baghdad Central alongside Waleed Zuaiter, Bertie Carvel, and Leem Lubany. Namir made her professional stage debut as Meera in Foxes at the Theatre503 in 2021 and played Nazreen in Steven Moffat's Netflix series Inside Man in 2022.

== Filmography ==
=== Film ===
| Year | Title | Role | Notes |
|---|---|---|---|
| 2014 | Two Seas | Anahita | Short film |
| 2016 | Astoria | Liliane | Short film |
| 2024 | See it Say it | Dounya | Short film |

=== Television ===
| Year | Title | Role | Notes |
|---|---|---|---|
| 2015 | Killing Jesus | Young Mary | Television film |
| 2015 | Homeland | Khadija | Episode: "Our Man in Damascus" |
| 2017 | The Tunnel | Yara Maleh | 1 episode |
| 2018 | Doctors | Leyla Farooq | Episode: "Suffer the Children" |
| 2018 | The Looming Tower | Hoda Al-Hada | 5 episodes |
| 2018 | Collateral | Mona Asif | Main role |
| 2020 | Baghdad Central | Mrouj al-Khafaji | Main role |
| 2022 | Inside Man | Nazreen | 1 episode |
| 2026 | The Lady | Dr. Chaudhry | 1 episode |
| TBA | Honey | Kamilla Akhmedova | |

=== Video games ===
| Year | Title | Role | Notes |
|---|---|---|---|
| 2017 | Assassin's Creed Origins | Voices | |
| 2023 | Assassin's Creed Mirage | | |
