= George D. Schwab =

American writer

George David Schwab
- George D. Schwab (photo by Sheila Robbins for NCAFP)
- Born: Georgs Dāvids Švabs; November 25, 1931 (age 94); Liepāja, Latvia
- Education: City College of New York (BA, 1954); Columbia University (MA, 1955; PhD, 1968)
- Occupations: American political scientist, editor and academic
- Known for: professor, author, president of The National Committee on American Foreign Policy
- Spouse: Eleonora Storch
- Parent(s): Arkady Schwab and Klara Schwab (née Jacobson)
- Website: ncafp.org

George David Schwab (Latvian: Georgs Dāvids Švābs; born November 25, 1931) is an American political scientist, editor, Holocaust survivor, and academic. He was the president of the National Committee on American Foreign Policy, an American non-partisan foreign policy think tank. He co-founded the organization in 1974 and served as its president from 1993 to 2015, and was the editor of its bimonthly journal, American Foreign Policy Interests.

== Early life and education ==
Schwab was born in Liepāja, Latvia, on November 25, 1931, to Arkady Schwab and Klara Schwab (née Jacobson) of Latvian Jewish ancestry. The family later immigrated to the United States.

He attended the City College of New York, graduating with a B.A. in 1954. He then attended Columbia University, where he earned a M.A. in 1955 and a Ph.D. in 1968.

== Career ==
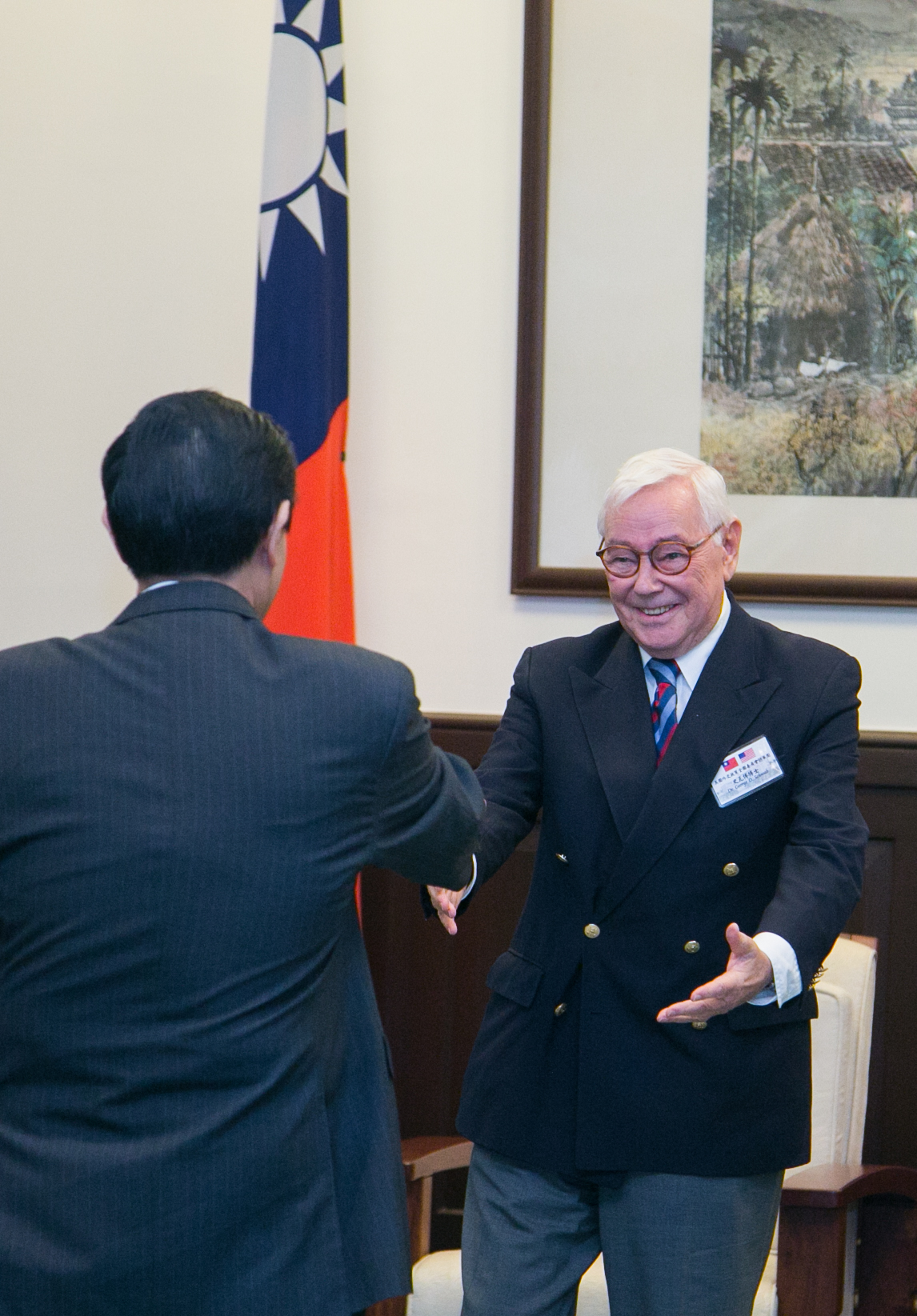
Schwab in 2014

Schwab began his teaching career at Columbia in New York City in 1959. From 1960 to 1968, he was at The City College of New York and the Graduate Center, CUNY. From 1968 to 1972 he was an assistant professor of history, an associate professor from 1973 to 1979, and professor from 1980 to 2000, and professor emeritus (City College and the Graduate Center), 2001–present.

In 1974, Schwab was a co-founder of the National Committee on American Foreign Policy with the late Hans J. Morgenthau. He has edited the committee's bimonthly, American Foreign Policy Interests, since the inception of its publication in 1976. In 1984 he contributed a chapter titled A Decade of the National Committee on American Foreign Policy to a Festschrift in honor of Hans J. Morgenthau and the National Committee. Before assuming the presidency of the Committee in 1993, he was its senior vice president and vice president.

Schwab has also lectured widely on his concept of The Open-Society Bloc at, among other institutions, the University of Freiburg in Germany and the Bundeswehrhochschule at Hamburg. He has also presented papers and actively participated at international gatherings in Tokyo; Paris (the Nobel Laureate conference at the Elysée Palace, 1988); Jerusalem; Washington, D.C.; and New York.

In the fall of 2001 the National Committee received a private endowment designed to honor the work of Professor Schwab which led to the creation of the George D. Schwab Foreign Policy Briefings. Speakers at the briefings range from heads of state, foreign ministers, ambassadors, officials of international organizations, and other foreign policy practitioners and experts. They are held throughout the year to give members and guests the opportunity to extend and enhance their understanding of issues that affect the national interests of the United States.

Schwab retired from teaching in 2000; he is currently professor emeritus of City College and the Graduate Center. He retired from the National Committee in 2016 and now holds the title of president emeritus.

== Personal life ==
In 1965 he married Eleonora Storch and they had three children, Clarence Boris, Claude Arkady, and Solan Bernhard. Mrs. Schwab died in 1998.

== Memberships ==
- Council on Foreign Relations
- German Studies Association
- The City University of New York Academy of Humanities and Sciences
- Columbia University's Seminar on the History of Legal and Political Thought and Institutions.
- United States Holocaust Memorial Museum in Washington, D.C.: Committee on Conscience, Academic Committee, Collections and Acquisitions Committee
- Latvian President's Commission of International Historians
- Vice President of the Telos-Paul Piccone Institute

== Awards ==
- Decorated Order of the Three Stars (Latvia) (2002)
- Ellis Island Medal of Honor (May 1998)
- Elie Wiesel Award (2018) awarded by United States Holocaust Memorial Museum

== Publications ==
- Subject of the 2010 "Prix Europe" (Bancarella Romana) award winning novel by Gwendolyn Chabrier titled Behind the Barbed Wire. It was published in French, English, Italian, and Russian.

== Editor ==
- American Foreign Policy Interests

== Translator ==
- (Carl Schmitt) The Leviathan in the State Theory of Thomas Hobbes, with Erma Hilfstein. Westport, CT and London, 1996 ISBN 0-313-30057-7. University of Chicago Press, 2008. Introduction translated into Chinese, 2018.
- (Carl Schmitt) Political Theology: Four Chapters on the Concept of Sovereignty, Cambridge, MA and London, 1985, 1988, Chicago, 2005 ISBN 0-226-73889-2. Introduction translated into Chinese, 2018.
- (Carl Schmitt) The Concept of the Political, New Brunswick, NJ and London, 1976, Chicago, 1996 ISBN 0-226-73886-8. Introduction translated into Chinese, 2019.

== Author ==
- The National Committee on American Foreign Policy at Thirty-Five, American Foreign Policy Interests, Vol. 31, No. 4, July–August 2009
- Letter to Pope Benedict XIV on the Governorship of East Jerusalem, No Going Back, London, 2009
- Bill Flynn, the National Committee on American Foreign Policy, and the Beginnings of the Northern Ireland Peace Process, Irish America, New York, 2008
- NATO and Transatlantic Security: An Overview, American Foreign Policy Interests, Vol. 30, No. 3, May–June 2008
- US National Security Interests Today, American Foreign Policy Interests, Vol, 25, No. 5, October 2003
- The National Committee on American Foreign Policy's Focus on Russia, The Harriman Economic and Business Review, Vol. I, No. 1, January 2000
- Carl Schmitt, a Note on a Qualitative Authoritarian Bourgeois Liberal, Staat–Souveränität–Verfassung, Berlin, 2000
- Journey to Belfast and London (with William J. Flynn), a National Committee on American Foreign Policy publication, New York, 1999
- Contextualizing Carl Schmitt’s Concept of Grossraum, History of European Ideas, Vol. 19, Nos. 1-3, 1994
- Carl Schmitt Hysteria in the US, Telos, No. 1, Spring 1992; Politische Lageanalyse, Bruchsal, 1993. In Chinese, 2018/
- Thoughts of a Collector, Dayez, Paris 1991
- The Broken Vow, the Good Obtained, United States Holocaust Memorial Museum Newsletter, Washington, D.C., February, 1991
- Elie Wiesel: Between Jerusalem and New York, Elie Wiesel, New York and London, 1990
- The Destruction of a Family, Muted Voices, New York, 1987
- A Decade of the National Committee on American Foreign Policy, Power and Policy in Transition, Westport, CT and London, 1984
- Toward a New Foreign Policy, United States Foreign Policy at the Crossroads, Westport, Ct. 1982 (editor and contributor)
- Eurocommunism: The Ideological and Political Theoretical Foundations, Westport, CT, 1981 (editor and contributor) ISBN 0-313-22908-2
- From Quantity and Heterogeneity: Toward a New Foreign Policy, Newsletter of the National Committee on American Foreign Policy, August–October, 1980
- State and Nation: Towards a Further Clarification, Nationalism: Essays in Honor of Louis L. Snyder, Michael Palumbo and William O. Shanahan, Westport, CT, 1981
- Schmitt Scholarship, Canadian Journal of Political and Social Theory, Vol. 4, No. 2., 1980; in Chinese 2018.
- United States Foreign Policy at the Crossroads, 1980, 1982 (editor and contributor) ISBN 0-313-23270-9
- American Foreign Politics at the Crossroads, in Innen-und Aussenpolitik. Bern, 1980
- The German State in Historical Perspective, Germany in World Politics by Viola Herms Drath (ed.), New York, 1979
- The Decision: Is the American Sovereign at Bay?, Revue européenne des sciences sociales (Cahiers Vilfredo Pareto), Tome XVI, No. 44, 1978
- Ideology and Foreign Policy, New York and London, 1978, 1981 (editor and contributor) ISBN 0-8290-0393-2
- Legality and Illegality as Instruments of Revolutionaries in their Quest for Power, Interpretation, Vol. 7, No. 1., January 1978
- Appeasement and Détente, Détente in Historical Perspective, 1975, 1981 (editor and contributor) ISBN 0-915326-01-9
- Carl Schmitt: Political Opportunist?, Intellect, Vol. 103, No. 2363, 1975
- The Challenge of the Exception: An Introduction to the Political Ideas of Carl Schmitt, 1970, 2nd ed. 1989. Japanese 1980. Italian 1986. Chinese 2011. ISBN 0-313-27229-8
- Switzerland’s Tactical Nuclear Weapons Policy, Orbis, Vol. XIII, No. 3, 1969
- Enemy oder Foe, Eppirhosis, Berlin, 1968, [Edited English version] Telos, No. 72, 1987. Original published in German; in Japanese in 1980; in Chinese in 2011; in Greek in 2018.
- Dayez: Beyond Abstract Art, Paris, 1967 ISBN B0006BY4GY
- "Carl Schmitt, Through a Glass Darkly, Eclectica, 17.71-72 (1988), 77-82
