= Drath =

Drath is a German surname. Notable people with the surname include:

- Eric Drath (fl. from 1988), American filmmaker
- Viola Herms Drath (1920–2011), German-American writer
