= Eyad Hourani =

Palestinian actor

- Born: 24 June 1988 (age 37); Ramallah, West Bank, Palestine
- Other name: Iyad Hoorani
- Occupation: Actor

Eyad Hourani (born 24 June 1988) is a Palestinian actor. He is known for his role on the film Omar as well as the TV shows The Pact and Medinah.

== Career ==
Hourani was born in Ramallah in the West Bank. He studied for three years at The Freedom Theatre's Acting School, graduating in 2011. After that, he appeared in Ashtar Theatre's Jasmin House and in Shakespeare's Richard II, which toured to London's Glove Theatre Festival.

In 2013, Hourani appeared in the film Omar, directed by Hany Abu-Assad. The film went on to win the Special Jury Prize at the 2013 Cannes Film Festival and was also nominated for Best Foreign Language Film at the 86th Academy Awards.

After that, Hourani has appeared in films like Rattle the Cage, Vanguard, and Palestine 36. He has also appeared in the TV shows like Jinn, The Pact, and Baghdad Central.

== Filmography ==
=== Film ===
Year	Title	Role	Notes
2013	Omar	Tarek	(as Iyad Hoorani)
2015	The Idol	Ali Kushk	
2015	Rattle the Cage	Kassab	(as Iyad Hoorani)
2016	The Parrot	David	Short film
2016	Tape	Ibrahim	
2019	Saturday Afternoon	Mute Guy	
2020	Vanguard	Omar	
2024	How Kids Roll	Ahmed	
2025	Palestine 36	Qusay	

=== Television ===
Year	Title	Role	Notes
2019	Jinn	Khaled	4 episodes
2020	Baghdad Central	Hamed	3 episodes
2022	The Pact	Ramiz	Main cast
2020–2023	Medinah	Ibrahim	3 episodes
