= The Pact (Qatari TV series) =

Qatari television series from Katara Studios

- Genre: Adventure; Drama; Science fiction
- Created by: Bobby Barbacioru
- Written by: Bobby Barbacioru; Gareth Brookes
- Directed by: Ahmed Al Baker; Bobby Barbacioru
- Starring: Rick Ravanello; Natassia Malthe; Eyad Hourani; Christian Brassington; Samm Wiechec; James Marshall; Becca Buckalew; Holt Boggs
- Country of origin: Qatar
- Original language: English
- No. of series: 1
- No. of episodes: 6

Production
- Running time: 40 minutes
- Production companies: Katara Studios; Organic Media Group

Original release
- Release: 26 March 2022

The Pact is a science fiction drama series created by Bobby Barbacioru. It was produced by Qatari company Katara Studios.

== Synopsis ==
The series is set in a post-apocalyptic world where a mysterious fog called "miasma" has overtaken the world causing disease and destruction. It follows two groups of survivors trying to survive while also finding the cause of it.

== Cast and characters ==
- Rick Ravanello as Sol
- Natassia Malthe as Freya
- Eyad Hourani as Ramiz
- Christian Brassington as Jan
- Samm Wiechec as Mara
- James Marshall as Kane
- Becca Buckalew as Stella
- Holt Boggs as Drummer

== Episodes ==
No.	Title	Directed by	Written by	Original release date	Prod. code	US viewers (millions)
1	"Death Is the Only Release"	Ahmed Al Baker & Bobby Barbacioru	Bobby Barbacioru & Gareth Brookes	March 26, 2022	TBA	N/A
2	"Postcard from Hell"	Ahmed Al Baker & Bobby Barbacioru	Bobby Barbacioru & Gareth Brookes	March 26, 2022	TBA	N/A
At Station 7, Drummer and Stella receive an ominous message.
3	"The Fear"	Ahmed Al Baker & Bobby Barbacioru	Bobby Barbacioru & Gareth Brookes	March 26, 2022	TBA	N/A
Jan is injured; Drummer is caught behind the Miasma by the Masked Man.
4	"The Last Walk"	Ahmed Al Baker & Bobby Barbacioru	Bobby Barbacioru & Gareth Brookes	March 26, 2022	TBA	N/A
Drummer emerges from the Miasma - he has undergone a dark change
5	"The Mother"	Ahmed Al Baker & Bobby Barbacioru	Bobby Barbacioru & Gareth Brookes	March 26, 2022	TBA	N/A
Beryx takes Mara to meet "The Mother".
6	"The Answer Is Here"	Ahmed Al Baker & Bobby Barbacioru	Bobby Barbacioru & Gareth Brookes	March 26, 2022	TBA	N/A
The Survivors make it to Station 7.

== Production ==
The Pact was created by Bobby Barbacioru, and written by Gareth Brookes and Ahmed Al Baker. Baker and Barbacioru also served as co-directors. The series was produced by the Qatari firm Katara Studios. Filming took place in Romania, Bulgaria, and Qatar.

== Broadcast ==
In February 2022, the show was picked up by The Roku Channel who made it available on March 26, 2022, to the United States, United Kingdom, and Canada. The series was released worldwide in July. Worldwide distribution was in charge of OMG.
