= The Old Man (TV series) =

Thriller television series (2022-2024)

- Genre: Action drama; Thriller
- Created by: Jonathan E. Steinberg; Robert Levine
- Based on: The Old Man by Thomas Perry
- Starring: Jeff Bridges; John Lithgow; E. J. Bonilla; Bill Heck; Leem Lubany; Alia Shawkat; Gbenga Akinnagbe; Amy Brenneman; Navid Negahban; Jacqueline Antaramian
- Composers: T Bone Burnett; Patrick Warren
- Country of origin: United States
- Original languages: English; Dari; Pashto
- No. of seasons: 2
- No. of episodes: 15

Production
- Executive producers: Jonathan E. Steinberg; Dan Shotz; Warren Littlefield; Robert Levine; Jon Watts; Jeff Bridges; David Schiff; Craig Silverstein; Ann Johnson; Graham Littlefield
- Producer: Judd Rea
- Running time: 40–64 minutes
- Production companies: Quaker Moving Pictures; The Littlefield Company; 20th Television (Note: Touchstone Television is credited as copyright holder for season 1 as it was originally developed at Fox21 Television Studios, later rebranded to Touchstone Television in 2020 before being shut down and folding into 20th Television.)

Original release
- Network: FX
- Release: June 16, 2022 – October 24, 2024

The Old Man is an American action thriller television series based on the 2017 novel The Old Man by Thomas Perry. It was developed by Jonathan E. Steinberg and Robert Levine and premiered on FX on June 16, 2022. The first season consisted of seven episodes. Following its premiere, the series was renewed for a second season, which premiered on September 12, 2024. In December 2024, the series was canceled after two seasons.

== Premise ==
Dan Chase is a former CIA operative and Vietnam veteran, who 30 years ago was in Afghanistan. After killing an intruder who breaks into his home, Chase goes into hiding. He rents a room from Zoe McDonald, who becomes his forced partner while on the run.

FBI Assistant Director for Counterintelligence Harold Harper is called to apprehend Chase because of his complicated past during the Soviet–Afghan War. Working alongside Harper are his protégé, FBI agent Angela Adams, CIA officer Raymond Waters, and Julian Carson, a hit-man hired by Harper to kill Chase.

== Cast and characters ==
=== Main ===
- Jeff Bridges as Dan Chase / Henry Dixon / Johnny Kohler / Peter Caldwell / Lou Barlow
- John Lithgow as Harold Harper
- E. J. Bonilla as Raymond Waters (season 1)
- Bill Heck as young Johnny Kohler / Dan Chase (season 1; guest season 2)
- Leem Lubany as young Belour Hamzad (née Daadfar) (season 1; guest season 2)
- Alia Shawkat as Angela Adams / Emily Chase / Parwana Hamzad
- Gbenga Akinnagbe as Julian Carson
- Amy Brenneman as Zoe McDonald / Marcia Dixon
- Navid Negahban as Faraz Hamzad (season 2; guest season 1)
- Jacqueline Antaramian as Khadija (season 2; guest season 1)

=== Recurring ===
- Hiam Abbass as Belour Hamzad (née Daadfar) / Abbey Chase (season 1)
- Jessica Harper as Cheryl Harper (season 1; guest season 2)
- Joel Grey as Morgan Bote (season 1; guest season 2)
- Kenneth Mitchell as Joe (season 1)
- Pej Vahdat as young Faraz Hamzad (season 1; guest season 2)
- Noor Razooky as young Khadija (season 1)
- Echo Kellum as Mike (season 1)
- Rade Serbedzija as Suleyman Pavlovic (season 2; guest season 1)
- Janet McTeer as Marion (season 2)
- Artur Zai Barrera as Omar (season 2)
- Sara Seyed as Faruza (season 2)
- Amir Malaklou as Tarik (season 2)

=== Guest ===
- Nelson Franklin as Dr. Howard (season 1)
- Christopher Redman as young Harold Harper (season 1)
- Jessica Parker Kennedy as Woman at Bus Stop
- Rowena King as Nina Kruger
- Jordan Bridges as Zachary (season 1)
- Faran Tahir as Abdellaatif Rahmani (season 1)
- Brad Beyer as Chip Harper (season 2)
- Ana Mulvoy-Ten as Anna Rollins (season 2)
- Nikolai Nikolaeff as Fedotov (season 2)
- John Ales as Ben (season 2)
- Nick Boraine as Pete (season 2)
- Daniyar as Pavel (season 2)

== Episodes ==
Season	Episodes	Originally released	
Season	Episodes	First released	Last released
1	7	June 16, 2022	July 21, 2022
2	8	September 12, 2024	October 24, 2024

=== Season 1 (2022) ===
No. overall	No. in season	Title	Directed by	Written by	Original release date	Prod. code	U.S. viewers (millions)
1	1	"I"	Jon Watts	Teleplay by : Jonathan E. Steinberg & Robert Levine	June 16, 2022	1CLE01	0.975
2	2	"II"	Jon Watts	Jonathan E. Steinberg & Robert Levine	June 16, 2022	1CLE02	0.643
3	3	"III"	Greg Yaitanes	Jonathan E. Steinberg & Robert Levine	June 23, 2022	1CLE03	0.821
4	4	"IV"	Greg Yaitanes	Jonathan E. Steinberg & Robert Levine	June 30, 2022	1CLE04	0.904
5	5	"V"	Zetna Fuentes	Jonathan E. Steinberg & Robert Levine	July 7, 2022	1CLE05	1.076
6	6	"VI"	Jet Wilkinson	Jonathan E. Steinberg & Robert Levine	July 14, 2022	1CLE06	0.769
7	7	"VII"	Jet Wilkinson	Jonathan E. Steinberg & Robert Levine	July 21, 2022	1CLE07	0.773

=== Season 2 (2024) ===
No. overall	No. in season	Title	Directed by	Written by	Original release date	Prod. code	U.S. viewers (millions)
8	1	"VIII"	Steve Boyum	Jonathan E. Steinberg	September 12, 2024	2CLE01	0.503
9	2	"IX"	Jet Wilkinson	Jonathan E. Steinberg	September 12, 2024	2CLE02	0.503
10	3	"X"	Steve Boyum	Story by : Jonathan E. Steinberg & Hennah Sekander; Teleplay by : Jonathan E. Steinberg	September 19, 2024	2CLE03	0.483
11	4	"XI"	Uta Briesewitz	Story by : Jonathan E. Steinberg & Craig Silverstein; Teleplay by : Jonathan E. Steinberg	September 26, 2024	2CLE04	N/A
12	5	"XII"	Ben Semanoff	Story by : Jonathan E. Steinberg & Elwood Reid; Teleplay by : Jonathan E. Steinberg	October 3, 2024	2CLE05	0.351
13	6	"XIII"	Uta Briesewitz	Story by : Jonathan E. Steinberg & Elwood Reid; Teleplay by : Jonathan E. Steinberg	October 10, 2024	2CLE06	N/A
14	7	"XIV"	Jason Ensler	Story by : Jonathan E. Steinberg & Daphne Olive; Teleplay by : Jonathan E. Steinberg	October 17, 2024	2CLE07	0.242
15	8	"XV"	Lukas Ettlin	Jonathan E. Steinberg	October 24, 2024	2CLE08	0.322

== Production ==
The series was announced in July 2019, with FX ordering a pilot with Jeff Bridges cast to star. In September, Jon Watts was set to direct the pilot and be an executive producer, with John Lithgow and Amy Brenneman added to the cast. Alia Shawkat joined in October. In November, Bob Iger announced that the show would air on FX on Hulu, and Austin Stowell was added to play a younger version of Chase. In February 2020, Kenneth Mitchell disclosed he had a role in the series. Stowell would be recast in March 2020 with Bill Heck, and Gbenga Akinnagbe, Leem Lubany, and E. J. Bonilla cast in main roles. Navid Negahban and Pej Vahdat were cast in recurring roles in December 2020.

Shooting the series was two-thirds complete when production shut down in mid-March 2020 due to the COVID-19 pandemic. Production resumed in late 2020 with three episodes remaining to film, but was soon halted when Bridges was diagnosed with lymphoma in October 2020 and departed for cancer treatment. The show stayed in production for a short period after his diagnosis to shoot scenes from the remaining episodes that do not feature his character. In September 2021, he announced his cancer was in remission. Production ultimately resumed in February 2022.

The first season consisted of seven episodes. The series was scored by T Bone Burnett and Patrick Warren, with incidental music included Elvis Costello, Charlie Parker, Robert Plant, and others.

On June 27, 2022, the series was renewed for a second season. In May 2023, it was reported that filming of the second season was suspended due to the 2023 Writers Guild of America strike. On December 17, 2024, the series was canceled after two seasons.

Pakistani actor Hameed Sheikh served as a dialect coach and cultural consultant for the series. Pej Vahdat explained in an interview that he, Bill Heck and Leem Lubany learned Dari language on the set.

== Release ==
The series premiered on June 16, 2022, on FX in the United States and Canada. It also premiered on Disney+ (Star) on July 13, 2022, in Australia and New Zealand, Star+ in Latin America and Disney+ Hotstar in India. The second season premiered on September 12, 2024, on FX.

== Reception ==
=== Critical response ===
For the first season, the review aggregator website Rotten Tomatoes reported a 97% approval rating with an average rating of 7.4/10, based on 61 critic reviews. The website's critics consensus reads, "The Old Man is just as intrepid and spiky—and derivative—as younger action heroes, with Jeff Bridges lending invaluable gravitas to this bone-crunching thriller." Metacritic, which uses a weighted average, assigned a score of 72 out of 100 based on 27 critics, indicating "generally favorable reviews".

For the second season, Rotten Tomatoes reported a 64% approval rating with an average rating of 6.5/10, based on 14 critic reviews. The website's critics consensus states, "Jeff Bridges and John Lithgow remain a compulsively watchable pair, but there's a nagging sense that The Old Man has lost a step in this overextended sophomore season." Metacritic assigned a score of 66 out of 100 based on 9 critics, indicating "generally favorable reviews".

=== Ratings ===
The premiere of The Old Man on June 16, with its first two episodes, became the most-watched cable series premiere since January 2021, surpassing 60 other cable dramas, comedies, and limited series. It also marked the most-watched FX series debut on Hulu for its opening weekend.

=== Accolades ===
Year	Award	Category	Nominee(s)	Result	Ref.
2022	Australian Cinematographers Society Awards	Telefeatures, TV Dramas & Mini Series	Jules O'Loughlin	Won	
2023	Golden Globes Awards	Best Actor in a Drama Series	Jeff Bridges	Nominated	
2023	Golden Globes Awards	Best Supporting Actor in a Musical/Comedy or Drama Series	John Lithgow	Nominated	
2023	Critics Choice Awards	Best Actor in a Drama Series	Jeff Bridges	Nominated	
2023	Critics Choice Awards	Best Supporting Actor in a Drama Series	John Lithgow	Nominated	
2023	Screen Actors Guild Awards	Outstanding Performance by a Male Actor in a Drama Series	Jeff Bridges	Nominated	
2023	Satellite Awards	Best Actor in a Miniseries, Limited Series or Motion Picture Made for Television	Jeff Bridges	Nominated	
2023	Satellite Awards	Best Actor in a Supporting Role in a Series, Miniseries, Limited Series or Motion Picture Made for Television	John Lithgow	Won	
2023	Satellite Awards	Best Miniseries and Limited Series	The Old Man	Nominated	
2023	AARP Movies for Grownups Awards	Best Actor - Television	Jeff Bridges	Won	
2023	AARP Movies for Grownups Awards	Best Television Series	The Old Man	Won	
2023	American Society of Cinematographers Awards	Episode of a One-Hour Television Series – Commercial	Jules O'Loughlin	Won	
2023	Visual Effects Society Awards	Outstanding Supporting Visual Effects in a Photoreal Episode	Erik Henry, Matt Robken, Jamie Klein, Sylvain Theroux, J.D. Streett	Nominated	
2023	Primetime Emmy Awards	Outstanding Lead Actor in a Drama Series	Jeff Bridges	Nominated	
2023	Primetime Emmy Awards	Outstanding Cinematography for a Series (One Hour)	Sean Porter (for "I")	Nominated	
2025	Screen Actors Guild Awards	Outstanding Performance by a Male Actor in a Drama Series	Jeff Bridges	Nominated	
