= The Butcher's Boy =

1982 book by Thomas Perry

- First edition cover
- Author: Thomas Perry
- Publisher: Scribner
- Publication date: 1982

The Butcher's Boy is a 1982 book written by American author Thomas Perry. The suspense novel won the 1983 Edgar Allan Poe Award for Best First Novel.

The book has been reprinted several times and was followed by three more novels in the "Butcher's Boy" series: Sleeping Dogs (1992), The Informant (2011), and Eddie's Boy (2020).

== Plot ==
The Butcher's Boy, features as its protagonist a professional hitman (whose real name is not given but who uses the alias Michael Schaeffer in sequels). Murder is a craft for the "Butcher's Boy," a reference to his foster father, "Eddie the Butcher," who raised him to follow in his two trades: as a cold blooded killer, and as an actual butcher for a cover life. When Eddie dies an unnatural death, his adoptive son continues in his footsteps, but leaves the butcher shop behind. After dispatching an innocent union member and a U.S. Senator, he arrives in Las Vegas, Nevada to pick up his fee. Instead of a payoff he finds himself on the wrong end of a murder contract. The Butcher's Boy seeks to collect the debt by terrorizing the Mafia - the lifelong source of his freelance jobs and current nemesis - into backing off.

Meanwhile, the initial hits completed by "The Butcher's Boy" have attracted the attention of U.S. government specialists on organized crime. Elizabeth Waring, a bright young, unmarried analyst in the Justice Department, begins to see a pattern in the killings. As the violence escalates around the United States, her colleagues and superiors suspect internecine warfare among the bad guys, though Waring deduces the fact that one man on a mission may be the key. As she works her way closer to his identity, she comes to admire his audacity and remorseless, and his creative efficiency in staying one step ahead of the Mob's death sentence.

The point of view switches back and forth between Waring and the killer, as he succeeds in evading both his Mafia pursuers and the government agents. However, he will find himself in similar circumstances decades later in Sleeping Dogs and The Informant, where both he and Waring have aged and share the knowledge and context of the earlier stories.

== Publication information ==
- Perry, Thomas. The Butcher's Boy. Scribner, 1982. ISBN 0-684-17455-3 (USA edition)
