= Omar (2013 film) =

2013 film

- Film poster
- Arabic: عمر
- Directed by: Hany Abu-Assad
- Written by: Hany Abu-Assad
- Produced by: Hany Abu-Assad; Waleed Zuaiter; David Gerson
- Starring: Adam Bakri; Waleed Zuaiter; Leem Lubany
- Cinematography: Ehab Assal
- Edited by: Martin Brinkler; Eyas Salman
- Release date: 21 May 2013 (Cannes)
- Running time: 96 minutes
- Country: Palestine
- Language: Arabic

Omar (Arabic: عمر, romanized: ʻUmar) is a 2013 Palestinian drama film directed by Hany Abu-Assad. It was screened in the Un Certain Regard section at the 2013 Cannes Film Festival where it won the Special Jury Prize. It was shown at the 2013 Toronto International Film Festival. The film was nominated for the Best Foreign Language Film at the 86th Academy Awards. It won Best Feature Film at the 2013 Asia Pacific Screen Awards. The film was screened at the United Nations in New York on 1 May 2014.

== Plot ==
Omar is a Palestinian baker who frequently climbs the West Bank barrier to visit his sweetheart, Nadia, a high-school girl whom he intends to marry. Omar and his childhood friends, Tarek and Amjad, have been practising attacks on soldiers. Caught in one of his crossings, Omar is beaten and humiliated by Israeli soldiers. The three later make a night time attack on a checkpoint, and Amjad acts as a sniper in fatally shooting an Israeli soldier.

Later, Omar and his friends are pursued by the Israeli authorities, who have been tipped off about him; Omar is captured. When he enters prison, he is tricked into incriminating himself by an agent named Rami who poses as a fellow prisoner. After being tortured by Rami to reveal who shot the Israeli soldier, Omar is facing life in prison. He secures his release in exchange for aiding in the detention of Tarek, whom Rami says he believes killed the soldier.

After release, Omar is suspected of being a collaborator and is stigmatized. His situation is worsened because Nadia is Tarek's sister. When Omar delays in helping with Tarek's capture, he is pursued by the Israelis. He is arrested again when a planned operation is betrayed, which results in the deaths of four militants. Other prisoners attack him as they believe he is a traitor, and he makes a second deal with Rami. He confronts Amjad, who admits betraying the other two. Amjad tells Omar that Nadia is pregnant with his child, which dishonours both Amjad and her. The Israelis used that fact to blackmail Amjad.

Omar forces Amjad to confess to Tarek, who tries to kill him. In the ensuing struggle, Tarek is killed when his gun accidentally goes off. With Rami's help, Omar and Amjad hide their involvement in his death.

Two years later, Omar visits Nadia and discovers Amjad was lying about having had an affair with her. But she married Amjad and they now have two children. She still loves Omar, and tells him that she had written a letter to him before her marriage, but Amjad did not deliver it.

Rami visits Omar to try to coerce him into killing a leading militant. Omar promises his assistance in capturing the new ringleader of the Jerusalem Brigade and, in exchange for a gun, he promises to tell Rami who had killed the soldier years ago at the checkpoint. Omar tells the ringleader about Amjad but gets agreement to allow Omar to deal with his old friend. Omar meets again with Rami, who is with three other Israeli agents, and is given the promised gun. He quickly turns it against Rami, killing him.

== Cast ==
- Adam Bakri as Omar
- Waleed Zuaiter as Rami
- Leem Lubany as Nadia
- Eyad Hourani as Tarek
- Samer Bisharat as Amjad
- Tarik Kopty as Tarek's father

== Production ==
Director Hany Abu-Assad describes putting together the idea of the film in one night, writing the structure of the story in four hours and writing the script in four days. After a year of securing finance, filming began at the end of 2012 and took place mainly in Nazareth, Nablus, and the Far'a refugee camp.

Waleed Zuaiter managed to secure the $2m budget for the film, 5% of which came from Enjaaz, the post-production fund of Dubai International Film Festival and the remainder from Palestinians.

== Distribution ==
Adopt Films acquired all U.S. rights to Omar after its premier at the Cannes Film Festival. UK distribution rights were acquired by Soda Pictures and distribution rights in France were sold to Pretty Pictures.

== Reception ==
=== Critical response ===
Omar has an approval rating of 90% on review aggregator website Rotten Tomatoes, based on 87 reviews, and an average rating of 7.46/10.The website's critical consensus states, "Twisty and riveting, Omar is a well-directed crime drama with uncommon depth". It also has a score of 75 out of 100 on Metacritic, based on 28 critics, indicating "generally favorable reviews".

=== Awards ===
Award/Festival	Category	Winner/Nominee	Won
Academy Awards	Best Foreign Language Film	Palestine	Nominated
Asia Pacific Screen Awards	Best Feature Film	Hany Abu-Assad, Waleed Zuaiter	Won
Asia Pacific Screen Awards	Best Performance by an Actor	Adam Bakri	Nominated
Asia Pacific Screen Awards	Achievement In Cinematography	Ehab Assal	Nominated
Camerimage	The Silver Frog Prize for Best Cinematography	Ehab Assal	Won
Cannes Film Festival	Un Certain Regard Jury Prize	Hany Abu-Assad, Waleed Zuaiter	Won
Dubai International Film Festival	Muhr Arab Best Director Award	Hany Abu-Assad	Won
Dubai International Film Festival	Muhr Best Film	Waleed Zuaiter	Won
Ghent International Film Festival	Youth Jury Award Best Film	Hany Abu-Assad	Won
Vilnius International Film Festival	The Audience Award		Won
Tromsø International Film Festival	The Norwegian Peace Film Award	Hany Abu-Assad	Won

== See also ==
- List of submissions to the 86th Academy Awards for Best Foreign Language Film
- List of Palestinian submissions for the Academy Award for Best Foreign Language Film
