= David Gerson =

Canadian film producer

David Gerson (born in Toronto) is a Canadian film producer. His film Omar was nominated for the Academy Award for Best International Feature Film. He previously worked at Focus Features. He has attempted to mount a film adaptation of The Corrections.

== Filmography ==
- Omar, (2013)
- Superpai, (2015)
- Skiptrace, (2016)
- Dark Crimes, (2016)
- Georgetown, (2019)
