= Vanguard (film) =

2020 Chinese film by Stanley Tong

- Theatrical release poster

Chinese name
- Traditional Chinese: 急先鋒
- Simplified Chinese: 急先锋
Transcriptions
- Directed by: Stanley Tong
- Written by: Stanley Tong
- Produced by: Stanley Tong
- Starring: Jackie Chan; Yang Yang; Ai Lun; Miya Muqi
- Cinematography: Lee Chi-Wah
- Edited by: Chi Wai Yau
- Music by: Nathan Wang
- Production companies: China Film International Media Co.; Tencent Pictures; Shanghai Lix Entertainment; Epitome Capital; Shenzhen Media Film & Television
- Distributed by: Golden Screen Cinemas
- Release date: 30 September 2020
- Running time: 108 minutes
- Country: China
- Languages: Mandarin; English; Arabic
- Box office: US$50.9 million

Vanguard is a 2020 Chinese action comedy film written and directed by Stanley Tong. The film stars Jackie Chan, Yang Yang, and Miya Muqi. It marks Chan's sixth collaboration with Tong.

Vanguard was originally scheduled to be released on 25 January 2020 in China but was postponed due to the COVID-19 pandemic. It was later released on 30 September 2020 in China, 20 November 2020 in the United States, and 25 December 2020 in India. The film received mixed reviews, with critics praising Jackie Chan's performance as well as the action sequences and music but criticising the screenplay, editing and runtime.

== Plot ==
Qin Guoli, a Chinese accountant based in Great Britain, has been forcibly contracted by Maasym, leader of the terrorist organisation Brothers of Vengeance, to finance his projects. After Qin had tipped off Scotland Yard, Maasym was killed in a military operation by US forces, but his son Omar has survived and now wants to get his hands on his father's money, whose whereabouts are solely known to Qin. Omar has hired the mercenary gang Arctic Wolves, who kidnap Qin and his new wife Meiwei during London Chinatown's Chinese New Year festival. Vanguard, an international security company assigned to protect Qin, sends agents Zhang Kaixuan, Lei Zhenyu and Mi Ya to rescue him. After the operation's successful conclusion, Qin asks Vanguard's director Tang Huanting to protect his daughter Fareeda, who is currently in Africa, before Omar can use her as leverage against him.

Tang, Lei, and Mi Ya travel to Africa and find Fareeda, but also have to contend with the Arctic Wolves and a poaching gang who have been hired as additional muscle. During the chaotic first altercation, Lei and Fareeda are separated from the rest of the group and hide out in the nearby jungle, forcing Tang and Mi Ya to search for them on foot, guided by satellite tracking provided by Vanguard headquarters. Tang and Mi Ya rejoin their companions and fight their pursuers in a furious river chase with an amphibian car and jet skis, which ends with Tang and Mi Ya getting stranded and Lei and Fareeda being captured. Broto, the leader of the Arctic Wolves, proposes to trade his captives for Qin, which Qin immediately agrees to.

Tang rallies his agents to storm Omar's fortress in the Middle Eastern city of Jiadebala and rescue the hostages. With some local help, the Vanguard operatives infiltrate the heavily guarded stronghold and make preparations for the next day's exchange. However, Omar and Broto have expected an intervention, and the operation quickly escalates into a running gun battle. When Vanguard is encircled and overwhelmed, Qin gives himself up to enable the agents to escape. Tang, Lei, Zhang, Mi Ya and Fareeda travel to Dubai, where Maasym has deposited his fortune, and cooperate with the local police to watch two Arctic Wolves mercenaries who have arrived there to facilitate a major arms deal for Omar with Maasym's money. Incidentally, this also gives Omar an opportunity to kill Admiral Greg Dawes, the man who killed Maasym and who has just arrived in Dubai.

Heavily surveilled by both sides, Omar, Broto and Qin meet with arms dealer Josef at a second-hand car dealership, where the money has been converted into cars made of pure gold; in return for his fee, Josef provides Omar with the control system for a missile attack drone, which the latter wishes to use against Dawes. Dubai police executes a strike against the terrorists, but their approach gives Omar's party plenty of time to activate the drone and then escape in the gold cars. The Vanguard agents move out to intercept the terrorists, and due to forewarning by the Dubai police, US forces intercept and destroy the drone. The chase ends inside a shopping mall, where Omar and Broto are overpowered and arrested, and the film concludes with the protagonists celebrating the Chinese New Year in Dubai.

== Cast ==
- Jackie Chan as Tang Huanting, the commander of Vanguard
- Yang Yang as Lei Zhenyu, an agent of Vanguard and godfather of Zhang Kaixuan's son
- Ai Lun as Zhang Kaixuan, an agent of Vanguard
- Miya Muqi as Mi Ya, an agent of Vanguard
- Zhenwei Wang as Xiao Wei, an agent of Vanguard
- Yang Jian Ping as Jian Ping, an agent of Vanguard
- Zhu Zhengting as Shendiao, an agent of Vanguard
- Jackson Lou as Qin Guoli, the accountant Vanguard is assigned to protect
- Xu Ruohan as Fareeda, Qin Guoli's daughter and a wildlife preservation activist
- Brahim Achabbakhe as Broto, leader of the Arctic Wolves mercenaries
- Eyad Hourani as Omar, a Middle Eastern prince and the leader of the Brothers of Vengeance
- Tomer Oz as Tunda, leader of a poaching gang whose activities have been exposed by Fareeda
- Mir Sarwar as Kalasu, a Vanguard agent in the Middle East
- Sayed Badreya as Abati, a chef from Jiadebala whose son was murdered by the Brothers of Vengeance
- Tam Khan as Marder, an Arctic Wolves mercenary
- Eric Heise as Admiral Greg Dawes, commander of the USS John C. Stennis
  - Kyle Paul as Admiral Greg Dawes (voice dubbing)
- Jeffrey Gullbrand as Josef, an arms dealer
- Fady Zaky as Omar's Bodyguard
- Haytham Mansour as Dubai Policeman
- Trishna Singh as Laila, a secret helper in Omar's fortress
- Denis Pereverzev as Leiv

== Production ==
The filming locations were in Zambia, Dubai, United Arab Emirates, India and in London. In January 2019, Jackie Chan almost drowned while filming a scene involving a jet ski for the film. Chan was reportedly paid 80 million yuan (approximately US$12 million).

== Soundtrack ==
Among the artists on the Official Soundtrack are Jackie Chan, who sings the theme song "Ambition in my Heart", and Dimash Kudaibergen.

== Release ==
It was to be released on 28 January 2020 in China but was withdrawn due to the COVID-19 pandemic. The theatrical releases in Singapore and the Philippines have been delayed due to the postponement of the film's release in China. As the outbreak of COVID-19 in China caused the cancellation of many theatrical premieres, certain regulations prevent any Chinese film from being released overseas before the film's local release in China.

On 1 September 2020, it was announced, that the film will hit Chinese theaters on 30 September 2020. The English version of the film opened in theaters in the United Arab Emirates and select neighboring countries on 8 October 2020.

Gravitas Ventures acquired the North American rights and had a wide release, including drive-ins and IMAX, on 20 November 2020.

This film released on Blu-ray and DVD format in Hong Kong on 15 December 2020.

The film released in India on 25 December 2020 in English, Hindi, Tamil and Telugu. It got a mixed to positive response.

== Reception ==
=== Critical response ===
On review aggregator Rotten Tomatoes, Vanguard holds an approval rating of 28% based on 68 reviews, with an average rating of 4.4/10. The website's critics consensus reads, "Vanguard isn't entirely bereft of fun for action fans, but only the most devout Jackie Chan fans will find much that's truly worth watching here." On Metacritic, it has a weighted average score of 36 out of 100, based on 12 critics, indicating "generally unfavorable reviews". Audiences at Douban, a Chinese media rating site, gave it an average 5 out of 10, while at PostTrak, 72% of American audience members gave the film a positive score, with 57% saying they would definitely recommend it.

Edmund Lee for the South China Morning Post rated Vanguard one and a half out of five, stating the film is "equipped with a cheesy Z-grade plot, forgettable villains, and some jaw-droppingly clunky lines of dialogue", being an "unashamedly old-fashioned Chan vehicle which makes one ponder why he's still going at it." Simon Abrams of RogerEbert.com gave the film two out of four stars, writing that though there were some moments of "joyful spectacle" like a water rafting chase involving a WaterCar Panther, "The movie's off-putting and constantly foregrounded political agenda wouldn't be so unpleasant if the action scenes were more plentiful and/or thrilling. [...] Chan's latest star vehicle didn't need to be anything more than a good work of propaganda, but it's not even compelling on those terms."

=== Box office ===
Vanguard grossed 246 million yuan (~US$37 million) in its first two weeks in Chinese cinemas. It performed the worst out of all the other local blockbusters during the national Golden Week holiday.

In the film's U.S. debut, it grossed $400,000 from 1,375 theaters in 178 cities.
