= Rock the Kasbah (film) =

- Theatrical release poster
- Directed by: Barry Levinson
- Written by: Mitch Glazer
- Produced by: Steve Bing; Bill Block; Jacob Pechenik
- Starring: Bill Murray; Kate Hudson; Beejan Land; Zooey Deschanel; Danny McBride; Scott Caan; Leem Lubany; Arian Moayed; Bruce Willis
- Cinematography: Sean Bobbitt
- Edited by: Aaron Yanes
- Music by: Marcelo Zarvos
- Production companies: Shangri-La Entertainment; Covert Media; Venture Forth Productions
- Distributed by: Open Road Films
- Release dates: October 22, 2015 (Belgium premiere); October 23, 2015 (United States)
- Running time: 106 minutes
- Country: United States
- Language: English
- Budget: $15 million
- Box office: $3.4 million

Rock the Kasbah is a 2015 American comedy film directed by Barry Levinson and written by Mitch Glazer. The film stars Bill Murray as Richie Lanz, a talent manager sent to Afghanistan for a USO tour, Kate Hudson as Richie's partner in country Merci, Bruce Willis as his armed protection and book client Bombay Brian and Leem Lubany as his musical discovery Salima Khan. Open Road Films released the film on October 23, 2015. The film takes its name from a song by The Clash.

== Plot ==
Richie Lanz, a has-been rock manager, takes his last remaining client Ronnie Smiler on a USO tour of Afghanistan. When Richie finds himself in Kabul, abandoned, penniless and without his U.S. passport, he discovers a young Afghan girl named Salima Khan with an extraordinary voice and manages to convince the producer of Afghan Star, Daoud, to put her through Afghanistan's version of American Idol.

== Cast ==
- Bill Murray as Richie Lanz
- Kate Hudson as Merci
- Zooey Deschanel as Ronnie
- Danny McBride as Nick
- Scott Caan as Jake
- Leem Lubany as Salima
- Beejan Land as Daoud
- Eugenia Kuzmina as Gulla
- Arian Moayed as Riza
- Bruce Willis as Bombay Brian
- Taylor Kinney as Private Barnes
- Glenn Fleshler as Army Warrant Office
- Sameer Ali Khan as Azam Ghol
- Fahim Fazli as Tariq
- Jonas Khan as Nizar
- Sarah Baker as Maureen

== Production ==
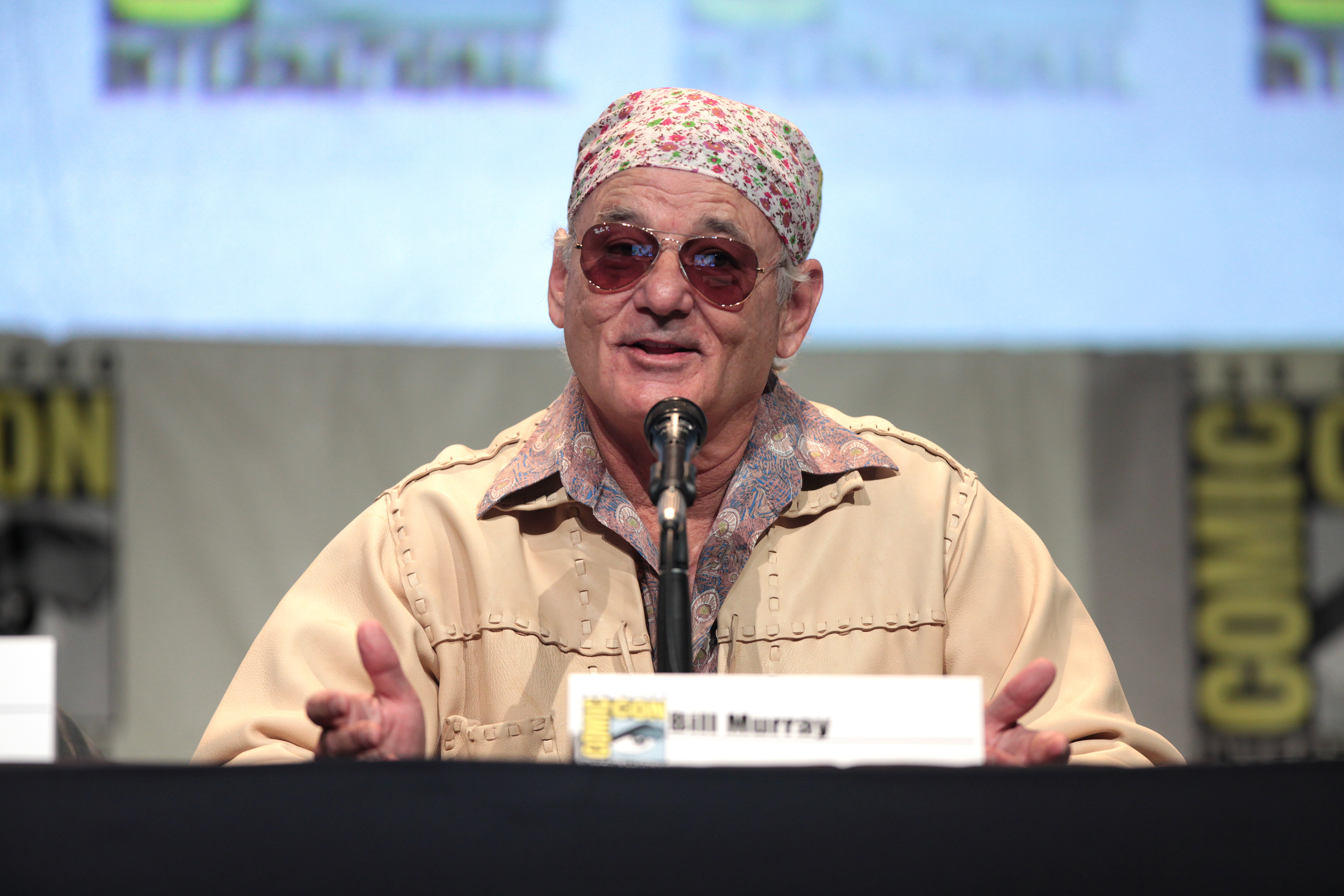
Bill Murray promoting the film at the 2015 San Diego Comic-Con as his character.

The story is very freely adapted from the 2009 documentary Afghan Star and was dedicated to one of the stars of that film, Setara Hussainzada. The film was announced in September 2013. In February 2014, Open Road Films acquired the US distribution rights to the film. In March 2014, Shia LaBeouf, who had been cast in the film, dropped out. A few days later, Scott Caan replaced LaBeouf. Principal photography and production began on June 2, 2014 and ended on July 30, 2014. It was filmed in Morocco.

== Release ==
On August 20, 2014, Open Road Films announced the film would be released on April 24, 2015. On May 13, 2015, the film's release date was pushed up from November 13, 2015 to October 23, 2015.

=== Box office ===
This film opened on October 23, 2015, alongside The Last Witch Hunter, Paranormal Activity: The Ghost Dimension, Jem and the Holograms and the expanded release of Steve Jobs. In its opening weekend, the film was originally projected to gross $6 million from 2,012 theaters; however, after grossing $75,000 during its Thursday preview screenings ($60 per theater), projections were lowered to $4 million. The film grossed $529,000 on its first day, and opening weekend projections were again lowered to $1.6 million. In its opening weekend, the film grossed $1.5 million, finishing 13th at the box office. According to Box Office Mojo, the film had the fifth-worst opening of all-time for a film playing in 2,000+ theaters, grossing an average $731 per venue (fellow opener Jem and the Holograms had an even worse $570 average).

== Reception ==
On Rotten Tomatoes, the film has an approval rating of 7% based on 123 reviews and an average rating of 3.38/10. The site's critical consensus reads, "The Shareef don't like Rock the Kasbah, and neither will viewers hoping for a film that manages to make effective use of Bill Murray's knack for playing lovably anarchic losers." On Metacritic, the film has a score of 29 out of 100 based on 35 critics, indicating "generally unfavorable reviews". On CinemaScore, audiences gave the film an average grade of "B−" on an A+ to F scale.
