= Brian Tyler Cohen =

American journalist and podcaster (born 1989)

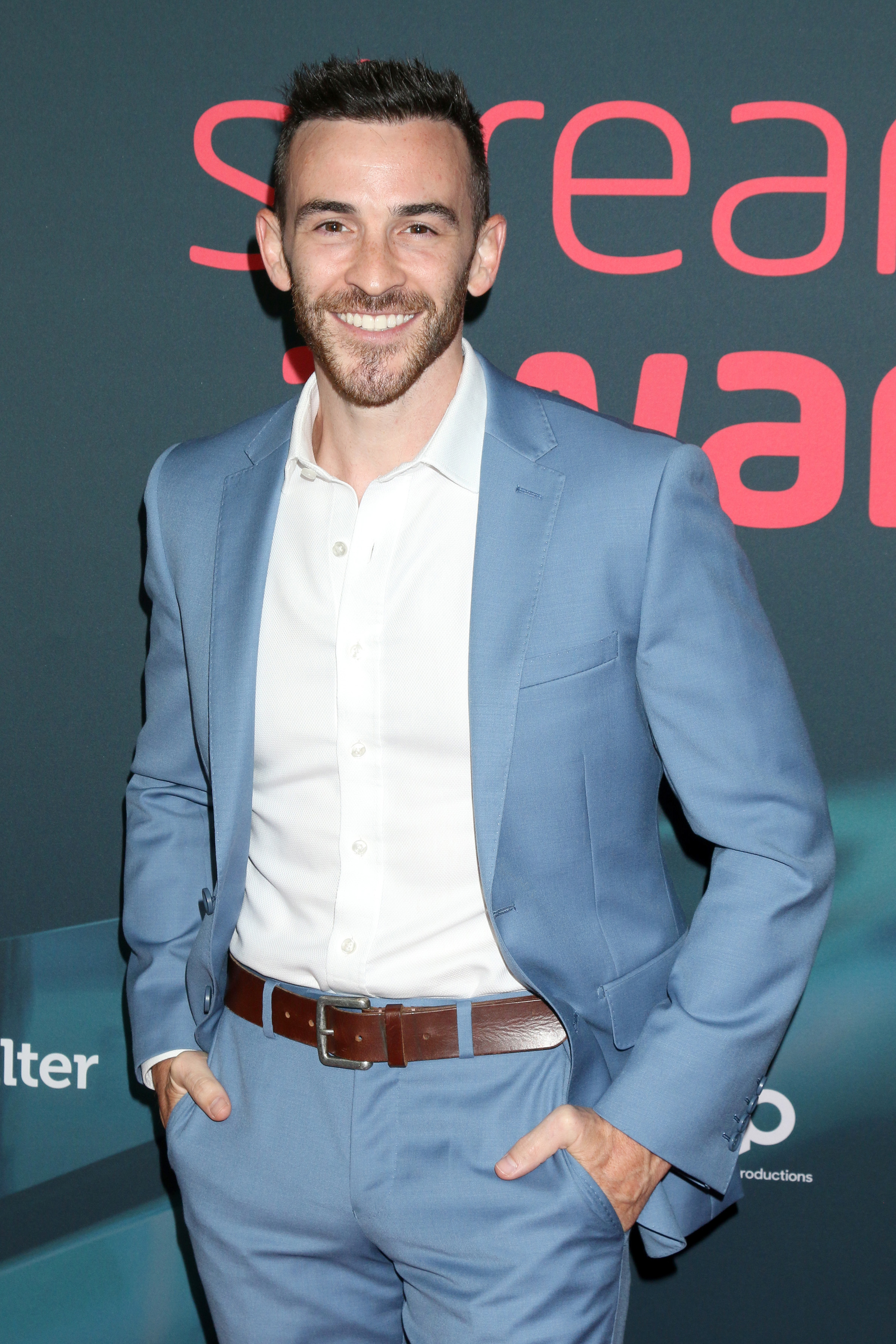
- Cohen at the 13th Streamy Awards in 2023
- Born: January 12, 1989 (age 37)
- Education: Lehigh University (BS, BA)
- Occupations: YouTuber, author, podcaster, political commentator, journalist
- Works: No Lie with Brian Tyler Cohen; Liberal Tiers with Pod Save America; The Legal Breakdown with Glenn Kirschner; Democracy Watch with Marc Elias; The Classroom with More Perfect Union; Class with Jamie Raskin; The Day After
- Political party: Democratic
- Movement: Progressivism in the US

Instagram information
- Page: Brian Tyler Cohen
- Genre: Politics
- Followers: 834,000

TikTok information
- Page: Brian Tyler Cohen
- Followers: 1.1 million

X information
- Handle: @briantylercohen
- Display name: Brian Tyler Cohen
- Followers: 618,000

YouTube information
- Channel: Brian Tyler Cohen
- Subscribers: 5.2 million
- Views: 5.24 billion
- Website: https://briantylercohen.com/

Brian Tyler Cohen (born January 12, 1989) is an American journalist, progressive podcast host, political commentator, and YouTuber. His political podcast is No Lie with Brian Tyler Cohen. On his YouTube channel, he interviews political figures, reports on politics, and live-streams events, including debates and election results. As of February 2026, his channel had more than 5.01 million subscribers and has received more than 4.79 billion views.

On February 25, 2022, Cohen became the first YouTube creator/podcaster to interview the 46th president of the United States, Joe Biden. He interviewed the 44th president, Barack Obama, in February 2026.

== Early life and education ==
Cohen is a 2011 graduate of Lehigh University in Bethlehem, Pennsylvania, with a BS degree in business and economics and a BA degree in English. He addressed the graduating class of 2011 as its class president.

== Career ==
Cohen acted in a handful of film and television roles from 2012 to 2016. In October 2018, he started posting political content on his YouTube channel, which primarily covers national politics. In June 2020, he started his first podcast, No Lie, during the midst of the COVID-19 pandemic. Cohen has since created multiple shows on his channel, co-hosting Democracy Watch with voting rights attorney and Democracy Docket founder Marc Elias and The Legal Breakdown with former federal prosecutor Glenn Kirschner.

In addition to hosting podcasts and creating YouTube videos, Cohen has been a speaker at Netroots Nation, Collision and Web Summit in Lisbon. He had been an occasional contributor to The Huffington Post prior to launching his show. On June 22, 2023, MS NOW (formerly MSNBC) announced that Cohen would be joining the network as a political contributor. He made his national television debut as an MSNBC contributor on The ReidOut on July 20, 2023.

In 2026 he garnered the Webby Award for News and Politics.

Cohen is the co-founder of Chorus Creator Incubator Program, a program launched in the wake of the 2024 presidential election to build a progressive creator's ecosystem.

Cohen is critical of mainstream media, citing the fact that most Americans now rely on new media rather than television news. He has criticized the Democratic Party for what he perceived as an overreliance on mainstream media, arguing that podcasts and YouTube shows now reach wider audiences.

== White House Media Offenders list ==
In June 2026, the Trump administration featured Brian Tyler Cohen on a newly created section of the official White House website entitled "Media Offenders". Under a subsection dedicated to "Leftist Influencers", the posting said that independent commentators such as Cohen and David Pakman were spreading inaccurate, misleading, or politically biased coverage of the administration. In its entry for Cohen, the website accused him of mischaracterizing administration policies and labeled his claims as "left-wing lunacy".

The White House Media Offenders project has drawn criticism from journalism organisations with Pakman comparing it to the Nixon administration's infamous “Enemies List”.

In his official response, Cohen said that he considered it a badge of honor to be put on the list.

== Books ==
On August 13, 2024, Cohen's debut book, Shameless: Republicans' Deliberate Dysfunction and the Battle to Preserve Democracy, (Note: ISBN 0063392887) was published by the flagship Harper imprint of HarperCollins. In it, Cohen outlines his evaluation of the current state of the Republican Party and what the Democrats and everyone who wants to protect democracy should do about it. It was met with favorable reviews. (Note: In Shameless, he skillfully chronicles Republicans’ decades-long descent into a politics of dysfunction, disinformation and personal destruction ... A must-read. — Speaker Nancy Pelosi) Shameless debuted at number one on The New York Times nonfiction best-seller list for the week ending August 17, 2024, and remained on the list for four weeks.

Cohen's second book, The Day After, debuted at #2 on The New York Times bestseller list dated August 2, 2026 and remained on the list for four weeks. The book explores Cohen's ideas on how to move forward after a Republican government falls, how Republicans have taken advantage of power, and how Democrats have failed to effectively use power.

== Podcast ==
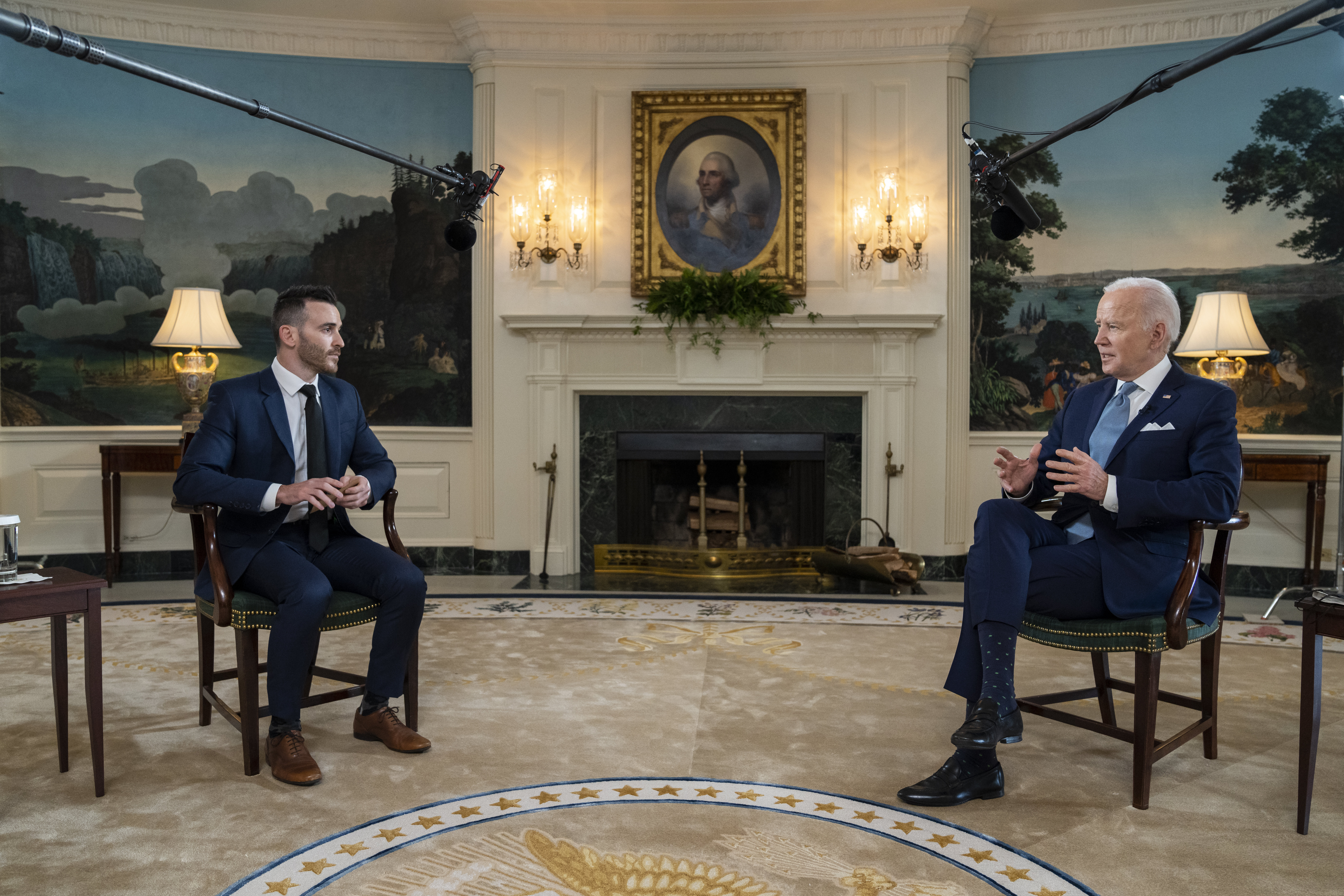
President Joe Biden being interviewed by Brian Tyler Cohen on February 25, 2022

Guests who have appeared on No Lie with Brian Tyler Cohen include:

- Stacey Abrams
- Joe Biden
- Cory Booker
- Pete Buttigieg
- Mark Cuban
- Jeff Daniels
- Jon Favreau
- John Fetterman
- Al Franken (Note: "The insidious reason Tucker Carlson supports the Canadian trucker protest". No Lie on 13 Feb 2022)
- Robert Garcia
- Dan Goldman
- Kamala Harris
- Adam Kinzinger
- Jon Lovett
- Rachel Maddow
- Gavin Newsom
- Barack Obama
- Alexandria Ocasio-Cortez
- Richard Ojeda
- Beto O'Rourke
- Nancy Pelosi
- Dan Pfeiffer
- Katie Porter
- Jen Psaki
- Jamie Raskin
- Bernie Sanders
- Adam Schiff
- Chuck Schumer
- Mary Trump
- Chris Van Hollen
- Alex Wagner
- Gretchen Whitmer
