= The Old Man (Perry novel) =

2017 novel by Thomas Perry

- First edition cover
- Author: Thomas Perry
- Audio read by: Peter Berkrot
- Language: English
- Genre: Thriller
- Publisher: Mysterious Press
- Publication date: January 3, 2017
- Publication place: United States
- Media type: Print (hardcover and paperback), e-book, audiobook
- Pages: 352
- ISBN: 978-0-8021-2586-6 (First edition hardcover)
- OCLC: 951453058
- Dewey Decimal: 813/.6
- LC Class: PS3566.E718 O43 2017b

The Old Man is a stand-alone thriller novel by Thomas Perry, published by the Mysterious Press imprint of Grove Atlantic in January 2017. A television adaptation of the same name starring Jeff Bridges aired on FX beginning June 2022.

== Synopsis ==
Former army intelligence officer Michael Kohler, who now goes by the name Dan Chase, lives in Norwich, Vermont with his two dogs. However, he has been in hiding for most of his adult life after absconding with $20 million during a mission in Libya.

== Reception ==
Publishers Weekly called it an "engrossing if not flawless thriller." They also praised the "refreshing" unconventionality of an older action protagonist and the novel's "palpable" tension. However, they criticized the "contrived and unnecessary" backstory of a secondary character.

Kirkus Reviews called it "Swift, unsentimental, and deeply satisfying."

The novel was nominated for the 2018 Barry Award for Best Thriller.

== Television adaptation ==
The novel was developed into a television series of the same name by Jonathan E. Steinberg and Robert Levine, with Jeff Bridges starring as the lead. The series premiered in the U.S. on FX on Hulu on June 16, 2022.
