= Jane Whitefield (novel series) =

Crime novel series by Thomas Perry

- Vanishing Act; Dance for the Dead; Shadow Woman; The Face-Changers; Blood Money; Runner; Poison Flower; A String of Beads; The Left Handed-Twin; The Tree of Light and Flowers
- Author: Thomas Perry
- Media type: hardcover; paperback; ebook; audio book
- No. of books: 10

Jane Whitefield is a crime and mystery novel series written by Thomas Perry. The series features Jane Whitefield, a Native American (Seneca) who has made a career out of helping people disappear. The series is usually narrated in third-person perspective. Perry weaves Native American history, stories, theology, and cultural practices into each novel.

== Plot ==
In college, Jane helped a friend disappear to avoid arrest for draft evasion, and discovered she had a talent for it. She calls herself a "guide". Jane relies on both modern skills and her Native American heritage to guide her clients from their old lives into new, presumably safer, lives. Jane's clients are generally in danger, whether from abusive partners, criminals, or the law. Her services include both the practical – documents, transportation, money, and protection – and the philosophical – how to adjust to a new and strange life and how to become a new person. She teaches her clients to think "like a rabbit, not a dog". As she explains to a client, "This is like dogs chasing a rabbit. When the rabbit wins, he doesn't get to kill the dogs and eat them. He just gets to keep being a rabbit."

After successful missions, she thanks the Jo-ga-oh with gifts of tobacco and nail clippings.

== Recurring characters ==
- Jane Whitefield is the daughter of a Huron (Snipe clan) construction worker and an American woman who was adopted by the Seneca (Wolf clan). Both of her parents are dead. Jane lives in Deganawida, a fictional village in upstate New York.
- Jake Reinert is Jane's elderly neighbor. He knew her parents, and watched Jane grow up. Jake tries to be protective of Jane without interfering. Occasionally, he provides assistance on a case.
- Harry Kemple was a client of Jane's who was killed in Vanishing Act. Jane feels guilty for Harry's death. Her subconscious brings Harry into her dreams to give her messages and advice.
- Carey McKinnon is a local doctor. He and Jane begin dating, and later marry. Carey doesn't approve of Jane's occupation.

== Books ==
Title	ISBN	Release	Additional languages
Vanishing Act	ISBN 9780679435365	1994	Chinese, French, Japanese, German, and Czech
Dance for the Dead	ISBN 9780679449119	1996	French, German, and Czech
Shadow Woman	ISBN 9780804115391	1997	Chinese, German, and Czech
The Face-Changers	ISBN 9780679453031	1998	French, German, and Czech
Blood Money	ISBN 9780679453048	1999	French, German, and Czech
Runner	ISBN 9780547247922	2010	
Poison Flower	ISBN 9781410446183	2012	
A String of Beads	ISBN 9780802123299	2014	
The Left-handed Twin	ISBN 978-1-61316-259-0	2021	
The Tree of Light and Flowers	ISBN 978-1-61316-730-4	2026	

In the first book, Vanishing Act, a man asks Jane to help him disappear, claiming that he was sent to her by an old client of hers, Harry Kemple. After setting him up with a new identity, Jane learns that Harry has been killed, as has Lew Feng, the gentleman from whom Jane obtains personal documents for her clients. Jane figures out that her new client is the killer. She must hunt him down and stop him to atone for the deaths of Harry and Lew.

To protect a young boy in Dance for the Dead, Jane has to hunt down the person responsible for killing multiple people. Another client that Jane reluctantly accepts had stolen millions of dollars through fraud, but the client's expertise helps Jane identify the killer.

In Shadow Woman, Jane has promised her newly-wed husband that she would give up being a guide. When a Las Vegas casino sends professional assassins after Jane and one of her clients, she must break her promise to Carey.

Despite Carey's misgivings about Jane's occupation, in The Face-Changers he asks her to help his old teacher disappear because he is being framed for a murder. Meanwhile, a group of criminals have been taking advantage of Jane's retirement to pose as her and prey on those seeking Jane's help.

In Blood Money, to protect a young girl in trouble, Jane gets involved with an accountant for the major Mafia families who has faked his own death.

In Runner, Jane helps a young, pregnant woman whose abusive boyfriend has sent a team of criminals to find her.

Poison Flowers is possibly the darkest novel in the series, as Jane is captured and tortured by villains from her past years of guiding runners.

In A String of Beads, the eight clan mothers task Jane with finding and returning her childhood friend who disappeared after being accused of murder.

In The Left-Handed Twin, while helping a woman who testified against her boyfriend in his trial for murder, Jane becomes the target of Russian mobsters.

The Tree of Light and Flowers is the final book in the series. Jane must protect her husband and child as well as two new runners while dealing with Russian mobsters who are determined to capture her.

== Major themes ==
Through the interweaving of current events and Native American history, Perry exposes the tensions between assimilation and separation. Jane is constantly confronting the contradictions between her modern life and her Seneca values. Jane uses modern technology to fulfill the ancient role of guide. Macdonald compares the historical tradition of Native American scouts with Perry's modern update: "This updated variation of a guide is a fine example of creative reimagining of a traditional role applicable to modern times."

In Murder on the reservation, Ray Browne notes that the series emphasizes the strengths of the Seneca while exposing the faults of white society, and speculates that Perry might be "pointing out to the Indians that there are new lifestyles available to them". Macdonald draws a similar conclusion: "By drawing on a traditional Native American role and demonstrating its viability and evolution in the modern world, Perry does what few other fiction writers do: he recognizes that Native Americans have the right to evade white expectations of who and what they are, and instead to forge modern roles for themselves within the frameworks of their heritage—to find ongoing meaning and significance rather than be trapped forever in the time warp of white imagining."

Perry presents Jane as an interpreter of traditional Seneca ways. In Native American Sleuths, John Donaldson notes that the way in which Perry incorporates Seneca beliefs and rituals makes them relatable for readers, and describes the passages as "poignant, because they are windows offering glimpses of a once-living culture, now gone forever; and disturbing because they reveal the whites' role in ending that way of life." Jane frequently interprets her dreams through Seneca lore to discover warnings and clues for situations that she is facing.

A recurring theme throughout the series is the battle between good and evil, presented in the form of a Seneca legend of Hawenneyu the creator and Hanegoategeh the destroyer eternally struggling against each other. Jane sums up why she does what she does in Dance for the Dead: "An innocent little boy is going to die. You’re either somebody who will help him or somebody who won’t. For the rest of your life you’ll be somebody who did help him or somebody who didn’t."

== Development history ==
After Vanishing Act, Perry signed a contract for one Jane Whitefield novel a year until 2000. In an interview, he said that after that, "Jane goes over Niagara Falls--clutching Dr. Moriarty to her chest in case I need her again." After working on his other novels for ten years, Perry began writing about Jane again in response to reader demand, saying "I decided then to do one every two or three years if I could and meanwhile do other things." On 25 January 2021, Perry announced that his next book would continue the Jane Whitefield series.

== Reception ==
Both Poison Flower and String of Beads were on the Los Angeles Times Bestsellers list.

Reviews for novels in the series are generally positive. Publishers Weekly calls Jane "an original and fascinating creation" and an "unusually intriguing heroine". The Orlando Sentinel says Perry has created "a fascinating heroine in Jane Whitefield, who is not only quick on her feet but savvy and compassionate." In Native American Sleuths, Donaldson praises Perry for the way in which the character's speech and behavior change between the mainstream world and the Indian world, and says "the Seneca background—both contemporary and historical—is handled with accuracy and understanding."

One reviewer critiqued The Face-Changers for "an overly complex structure that obliges a reader to put up with long passages filled with nothing but the minutiae of pursuit and paranoia." Another described the same book as "a thriller of a disappearing act, involving low-tech/high-brain escape techniques of dazzling ingenuity".

The Denver Post describes Blood Money as "an excellent novel of suspense, one whose success is based on the strength and wits of its characters as opposed to one built on high-tech gadgetry" and "a bright and engaging adventure that pulls readers in with an interesting premise and wonderful characters and holds their attention with action that is both unexpected and credible", and Kirkus called it "compulsively readable".

By the sixth book, Runner, Publishers Weekly refers to the series as formulaic, and criticizes the lack of backstory for new readers.

In its review for Poison Flower, The Washington Times calls Jane "perhaps one of the most intriguing characters in literary crime" and says it is "especially interesting to track her recollections of her Seneca ancestry and her ultimate reliance on another kind of civilization." Of A String of Beads, it says "what is most intriguing about his Whitefield series is the intense detail that accompanies its developments."

Publishers Weekly calls A String of Beads, the last book in the series to date, "a hair-raising adventure with a woman warrior who would make her Seneca forbears proud."

The book Shaman or Sherlock? says that "Perry makes both Whitefields credible—the native woman with a secure role in the tribal hierarchy and a deep-seated commitment to tribal values, and the highly competent modern professional, who skirts the edge of the law to do good in her community."

== Awards and nominations ==
Vanishing Act was chosen one of the "100 Favorite Mysteries of the Twentieth Century", selected by the Independent Mystery Booksellers Association's online members. Dance for the Dead was shortlisted for the Dilys Award in 1997. In 2021, Vanishing Act was included in Parade's list of "101 Best Mystery Books of All Time". The Left-handed Twin was selected for Suspense Magazine's "Best of 2021" in the thriller suspense category.

== Adaptations ==
Although no adaptation of the Jane Whitefield series has made it to the screen, in 1997 a movie based on the series was being adapted for Mutual Film Company. A TV series was initially sold to CBS in 2010, and then was picked up by The CW in 2012, but was never released.
