= National Committee on American Foreign Policy =

American-based activist organization

Coordinates: 40.75745°N 73.97414°W

- Abbreviation: NCAFP
- Formation: 1974 (by Hans Morgenthau)
- Type: Non-profit, nonpartisan activist organization
- Headquarters: 320 Park Avenue; New York City, New York; United States
- Board Chair: Jeffrey R. Shafer
- Acting President: Susan M. Elliott
- Website: www.ncafp.org

The National Committee on American Foreign Policy (NCAFP) is an American nonprofit, nonpartisan activist organization dedicated to the resolution of conflicts that threaten United States interests.

Founded in 1974 by Hans Morgenthau, NCAFP works to identify, articulate, and advance U.S. foreign-policy interests within the framework of political realism.

== Mission ==
NCAFP's topics of interest include:

- Preserving and strengthening national security
- Supporting countries committed to the values and practice of political, religious, and cultural pluralism
- Improving U.S. relations with the developed and developing worlds
- Advancing human rights
- Encouraging realistic arms-control agreements
- Curbing the proliferation of nuclear and other unconventional weapons
- Promoting an open and global economy

The organization believes that an informed public is vital to a democratic society. To promote this, it offers educational programs to its members and general audiences that address security challenges facing the U.S. and publishes a variety of publications, including the bimonthly journal, American Foreign Policy Interests.

== History ==
The National Committee was founded in 1974 by Hans J. Morgenthau along with others dedicated to the resolution of conflicts that threaten U.S. interests.

The National Committee grew quickly in size and influence. It held public seminars regularly, assembled task forces in order to analyze areas of critical concern to the United States, and published journals and pamphlets containing summaries and policy recommendations derived from high-level conferences and briefings featuring American and foreign policymakers. In 1981, the first Hans J. Morgenthau Award was presented to NCAFP president Angier Biddle Duke. Subsequent recipients have included Henry Kissinger, George Shultz, James Baker III, Margaret Thatcher, and Colin Powell. A second award, the George F. Kennan Award for Distinguished Public Service, was established in 1994. Recipients include George F. Kennan, Cyrus R. Vance, Paul A. Volcker, Richard C. Holbrooke, John D. Negroponte, and General David H. Petraeus.

In 1993 William J. Flynn, chairman and chief executive officer of Mutual of America, became the chairman of the National Committee. When the British and Irish governments issued the Downing Street Declaration at the end of that year, the National Committee under his leadership placed a full-page ad in The New York Times challenging every party involved in the conflict to attend an NCAFP-sponsored conference to air the arguments of all sides. The National Committee was instrumental in convincing President Bill Clinton to issue a visa to Gerry Adams, the leader of Sinn Féin. Adams's first appearance in the United States enabled him to begin to develop ties with key leaders in New York and Washington that gave him and his party the assurance necessary to enter into peace negotiations, sign the Belfast Agreement, and contend for and win political office in the North. In recognition of William Flynn's achievements, the National Committee established the William J. Flynn Initiative for Peace Award in 1997. Among the recipients are George J. Mitchell, Marjorie Mowlam, Viola Drath, Hugh Carey, and Gerry Adams, M.P.

Shortly after establishing its Northern Ireland project, the NCAFP launched its track I-1/2 and track II project on U.S.–China relations and the question of Taiwan. The project gradually grew into the Forum on Asia-Pacific Security. The NCAFP, under this thematic umbrella, sponsored security talks with North Korea on nuclear issues and, more recently, security issues affecting U.S.–Japan and U.S.–South Korea relations. The entire Forum on Asia-Pacific Security is largely conducted at track I-1/2 and track II levels.

Since its founding, the National Committee has focused its attention on significant geopolitical regions such as the Middle East and strategic partnerships such as Transatlantic Relations. More recently, as an outgrowth of those studies, the NCAFP established projects on the Caspian Sea Basin and U.S.–UN relations, as well as on Africa. While the committee's scope has broadened, it remains anchored to its values: the preservation and strengthening of national security; supporting political, religious, and cultural pluralism; improving U.S. relations with its allies; advancing human rights; curbing nuclear proliferation, encouraging realistic arms-control agreements; and promoting an open global economy.

== Task forces ==
Its long-term task forces bring together U.S. and foreign scholars, foreign-policy practitioners, and others to off-the-record and sometimes closed-door forums where adversaries can, over a period of years, air their views unencumbered by official rhetoric.

Shorter-term task forces deal with immediate foreign policy challenges facing the U.S.

=== Meetings ===
The organization's Meetings Program offers members and guests the opportunity to share their thoughts on U.S. foreign policy with influential policymakers, diplomats, renowned scholars, and foreign policy specialists. Each year, the organization convenes a series of programs, including single speaker events, panels and round tables addressing immediate and long-term issues of national security.

=== Special initiatives ===
In May 2004, it launched its Forum on Northeast Asian Security. Projects chaired by Henry Kissinger and Paul Volcker include exploring the potential for a nuclear-free Korean Peninsula; a Northeast Asian Security Forum, composed of the U.S., Japan, China, Russia, South Korea and North Korea; and breaking the impasse between China and Taiwan.

== Publications ==
A distinguishing activity of the organization is the publication and dissemination of firm, reasoned positions designed to help formulate American foreign policy. When, after study and discussion, the organization or one of its task forces reaches a consensus on an aspect of foreign policy that affects American national interests, it makes that judgment known to the Administration, the U.S. Congress, the media and the general public.

=== American Foreign Policy Interests ===
A long-time component of the organization's publication series was its bimonthly journal, American Foreign Policy Interests. The journal presented authoritative and provocative articles on critical questions of foreign policy written by leading scholars and policy experts. It was discontinued in 2015.

=== Books and booklets ===
The organization publishes short booklets of policy reports and recommendations. Additionally, the organization publishes speeches and summaries of discussions that have been the hallmarks of its foreign policy briefings, lecture series, and award ceremonies.

== Awards ==
The organization presents five awards:

=== Hans J. Morgenthau Award ===
The award was established in 1981 to commemorate Morgenthau's seminal contributions to the theory and the practice of American foreign policy. It is awarded to an individual whose intellectual attainments and/or practical contributions to U.S. foreign policy have been judged so exemplary in the tradition of Professor Morgenthau as to merit this singular award. Recipients include:

- Angier Biddle Duke
- Sol Linowitz
- Henry Kissinger
- Jeane Kirkpatrick
- George P. Shultz
- David Rockefeller
- James Baker
- Margaret Thatcher
- Thomas R. Pickering
- King Hussein of Jordan
- Colin Powell
- Richard N. Haass

=== George F. Kennan Award for Distinguished Public Service ===
The award was established in 1994 in honor of George F. Kennan, scholar, diplomat and statesman. It honors an American who has served the U.S. in an exemplary way and has made a seminal contribution to defining and illuminating the national interests of the U.S. Recipients include:

- George F. Kennan
- Cyrus Vance
- Paul Volcker
- Richard Holbrooke
- Maurice R. Greenberg
- John Negroponte
- General David Petraeus
- Raymond Kelly

=== William J. Flynn Initiative for Peace Award ===
The award was established 1997 as the Initiative for Peace Award in honor of William J. Flynn, NCAFP chairman, for his decisive leadership and daring diplomacy in spurring two cease-fires and promoting the peace process in Northern Ireland. Renamed in 2001, it is presented to an individual who has worked tirelessly to resolve a conflict that has affected the national interests of the U.S. Recipients include:

- William J. Flynn
- George J. Mitchell
- Marjorie Mowlam
- Viola Herms Drath
- Hugh Carey
- Gerry Adams

=== Global Business Leadership Award ===
The award honors a prominent business leader whose efforts have contributed to setting an unimpeachable standard for globally oriented corporate citizenship promoting the national interests of the U.S. Recipients include:

- Paul E. Jacobs

=== 21st Century Leader Award ===
The award was created to recognize the achievements of individuals under the age of 40 who display a serious commitment to furthering the U.S.'s strategic policy interests in accord with the principles of political realism. Through their professional or personal pursuits, they make important contributions to the international dialogue and demonstrate a promising future in the realm of U.S. foreign policy. Recipients include:

- Nancy Walbridge Collins
- Abraham Denmark
- Marisa Porges
- Nathaniel Fick
- John Delury
- Joshua Cooper Ramo
- Nicholas Thompson

== See also ==
- List of think tanks in the United States
