= Leem Lubany =

Palestinian actress

- ليم لوباني
- Born: August 31, 1996 (age 30); Nazareth, Israel
- Occupation: Actress
- Years active: 2013–present

Leem Lubany (Arabic: ليم لوباني, Hebrew: לים לובאני; born August 31, 1996) is an Israeli Arab-Palestinian actress. She is known for her role as Nadia in the 2013 film Omar. She also played Gabrielle Joubert in the American television series Condor (2018–2020). Her most recent project is The Old Man, also an American TV series, starring Jeff Bridges.

== Early life and education ==
Lubany was born in Nazareth, Israel to a Palestinian family. She was a senior at Harduf Waldorf School in kibbutz Harduf, when she made her professional film debut in Hany Abu-Assad's Omar.

== Career ==
Lubany made her debut in Omar, despite having no acting training. The film was nominated for the Best Foreign Language Film at the 86th Academy Awards.

In 2014, Leem Lubany appeared in A to B, an Emirati film. That same year, she played the role of Salima in the American comedy Rock the Kasbah, set in Afghanistan and starring Bill Murray.

== Filmography ==
Film and television roles
Year	Title	Role	Notes
2013	Omar	Nadia	Film
2014	From A to B	Shadya	Film
2015	Rock the Kasbah	Salima	Film
2018	Saint Judy	Asefa	Film
2018–2020	Condor	Gabrielle Joubert	Main role (season 1); guest role (season 2)
2020	Baghdad Central	Sawsan al-Khafaji	Main role
2022–2024	The Old Man	Young Abbey Chase	Main role
2026	Blue Lights	Amira Saeed	Supporting role
TBA	Apart †	TBA	Film; post-production
