= Miasma =

Miasma or miasm may refer to:

- Miasma (ancient Greek religion), a contagious power that has an independent life of its own

== Medicine ==
- Miasma theory, an obsolete medical theory that held that diseases were caused by a noxious form of "bad air"
- Miasm (homeopathy), an "infectious principle" underlying chronic disease and "peculiar morbid derangement of vital force"

== Music ==
- Miasma (album), a 2005 album by the Black Dahlia Murder
- Miasma (EP), a 2001 EP by Hecate Enthroned
- Miasma, a 1987 album by the Bevis Frond
- "Miasma" (Ghost song), 2018

== See also ==
- Miasmata, a 2012 video game
- Miasmata (album), a 1996 album by Vas Deferens Organization
