= Thomas Perry (author) =

American novelist (1947–2025)

- Born: August 7, 1947; Tonawanda, New York, U.S.
- Died: September 15, 2025 (aged 78); Los Angeles, California, U.S.
- Education: Cornell University (BA); University of Rochester (PhD)
- Occupation: Novelist
- Spouse: Jo Lee (m. 1980)
- Children: 2
- Writing career
- Genres: Mystery, Thriller
- Notable works: The Butcher's Boy, Metzger's Dog, Jane Whitefield series

Thomas Edmund Perry (August 7, 1947 – September 15, 2025) was an American mystery and thriller novelist. He received a 1983 Edgar Award from the Mystery Writers of America for Best First Novel for The Butcher's Boy.

== Life and career ==
Thomas Edmund Perry was born in Tonawanda, New York, on August 7, 1947. He received a B.A. from Cornell University in 1969 and his Ph.D. in English literature from the University of Rochester in 1974. He worked as a laborer, maintenance man, commercial fisherman, weapons mechanic, university administrator and teacher, as well as a television writer and producer (Simon & Simon, 21 Jump Street, Star Trek: The Next Generation). Through December 2024, Perry published 31 novels.

Perry lived in Southern California with his wife, author Jo (née Lee). The couple married in 1980 and had two children. He died from an aortic dissection at a hospital in Los Angeles on September 15, 2025, at the age of 78.

== Writings ==
Perry's work covered a variety of fictional suspense starting with The Butcher's Boy, which received a 1983 Edgar Award from the Mystery Writers of America for Best First Novel, followed by Metzger's Dog, Big Fish, Island, and Sleeping Dogs. He then launched the critically acclaimed Jane Whitefield series: Vanishing Act (chosen as one of the "100 Favorite Mysteries of the Century" by the Independent Mystery Booksellers Association), Dance for the Dead, Shadow Woman, The Face Changers, Blood Money, Runner, and Poison Flower.

Perry developed a non-series list of mysteries with Death Benefits, Pursuit (which won a Gumshoe Award in 2002), Dead Aim, Night Life, Fidelity, and Strip. The New York Times selected Night Life for its best seller selection. In The Informant, released in 2011, Perry brought back the hit-man character first introduced in The Butcher's Boy and later the protagonist in Sleeping Dogs.

The Informant was awarded the 2012 Barry Award for Best Thriller. Eddie's Boy received the 2021 Barry Award for Best Thriller. In 2021, Vanishing Act was included in Parade's list of "101 Best Mystery Books of All Time".

== Bibliography ==
Year	Title	Publisher	Series	ISBN
1982	The Butcher's Boy	Scribner	Butcher's Boy	978-0-684-17455-6
1983	Metzger's Dog	Scribner		978-0-684-17948-3
1985	Big Fish	Scribner		978-0-684-18367-1
1987	Island	Putnam		978-0-399-13327-5
1992	Sleeping Dogs	Random House	Butcher's Boy	978-0-679-41064-5
1995	Vanishing Act	Random House	Jane Whitefield	978-0-679-43536-5
1996	Dance for the Dead	Random House	Jane Whitefield	978-0-679-44911-9
1997	Shadow Woman	Random House	Jane Whitefield	978-0-679-45302-4
1998	The Face-Changers	Random House	Jane Whitefield	978-0-679-45303-1
1999	Blood Money	Random House	Jane Whitefield	978-0-679-45304-8
2001	Pursuit	Random House		978-0-679-45306-2
2001	Death Benefits	Random House		978-0-679-45306-2
2002	Dead Aim	Random House		978-1-4000-6003-0
2006	Nightlife	Random House		978-1-4000-6004-7
2007	Silence	Harcourt	Jack Till	978-0-15-101289-3
2008	Fidelity	Harcourt		978-0-15-101292-3
2009	Runner	Houghton Mifflin Harcourt	Jane Whitefield	978-0-15-101528-3
2010	Strip	Houghton Mifflin Harcourt		978-0-15-101522-1
2011	The Informant	Houghton Mifflin Harcourt	Butcher's Boy	978-0-547-56933-8
2012	Poison Flower	Mysterious Press	Jane Whitefield	978-0-8021-2605-4
2013	The Boyfriend	Grove	Jack Till	978-0-8021-2606-1
2014	A String of Beads	Grove	Jane Whitefield	978-0-8021-2329-9
2016	Forty Thieves	Mysterious Press		978-0-8021-2452-4
2017	The Old Man	Mysterious Press		978-0-8021-2586-6
2018	The Bomb Maker	Mysterious Press		978-0-8021-2748-8
2019	The Burglar	Grove		978-0-8021-2900-0
2020	A Small Town	Mysterious Press		978-0-8021-4806-3
2020	Eddie's Boy	Mysterious Press	Butcher's Boy	978-0-8021-5777-5
2021	The Left-Handed Twin	Mysterious Press	Jane Whitefield	978-1-61316-259-0
2023	Murder Book	Mysterious Press		978-1-61316-383-2
2024	Hero	Mysterious Press		978-1-61316-477-8
2025	Pro Bono	Mysterious Press		978-1-61316-616-1
2026	The Tree of Light and Flowers	Mysterious Press	Jane Whitefield	978-1-61316-730-4
