= Baghdad Central (TV series) =

British television series

- Genre: Crime thriller; Neo-noir
- Based on: Baghdad Central by Elliott Colla
- Written by: Stephen Butchard
- Directed by: Alice Troughton
- Starring: Waleed Zuaiter; Bertie Carvel; Clara Khoury; Leem Lubany; Corey Stoll
- Music by: H. Scott Salinas
- Country of origin: United Kingdom
- Original languages: English; Arabic
- No. of seasons: 1
- No. of episodes: 6

Production
- Executive producers: Kate Harwood; Stephen Butchard
- Producer: Jonathan Curling
- Production company: Euston Films

Original release
- Network: Channel 4
- Release: 3 February – 9 March 2020

Baghdad Central is a British crime thriller television series set in Iraq and first broadcast in 2020. It was based on the 2014 novel by Elliott Colla, and adapted by Stephen Butchard. It was directed by Alice Troughton.

== Synopsis ==
The series is set in Iraq in 2003, shortly after the ousting of Saddam Hussein. It centres on former policeman, Muhsin al-Khafaji (Waleed Zuaiter), as he tries to find his missing daughter, Sawsan (Leem Lubany). He is mistakenly arrested and tortured by United States troops. After that, he is recruited by a former British policeman, Frank Temple (Bertie Carvel), to become a police officer in the Green Zone.

== Cast ==
- Waleed Zuaiter as Muhsin al-Khafaji
- Bertie Carvel as Frank Temple
- Clara Khoury as Professor Zubeida Rashid
- Leem Lubany as Sawsan
- July Namir as Mrouj
- Tawfeek Barhom
- Charlotte Spencer
- Corey Stoll as John Parodi
- Neil Maskell as Douglas Evans

=== Recurring ===
- Fady Elsayed as Ibrahim Jabani

== Production ==
Filming began in September 2018, and took place in Morocco, including in the cities of Ouarzazate, Rabat, Casablanca and Mohammedia.

== Release ==
Baghdad Central was first broadcast on Channel 4 in February 2020. In the United States, it has been broadcast on Hulu.

== Reception ==
Baghdad Central has received mostly positive reviews according to aggregator websites, scoring 78 on Metacritic and 83% on Rotten Tomatoes as of May 2020.

== Accolades ==
Zuaiter was a nominee for the Best Actor award in the 2021 British Academy Television Awards.
