= Georgetown (film) =

2020 American film by Christoph Waltz

- Film poster
- Directed by: Christoph Waltz
- Written by: David Auburn
- Based on: "The Worst Marriage in Georgetown" by Franklin Foer
- Produced by: John Cheng; Brad Feinstein; David Gerson; Brett Ratner; Andrew Levitas
- Starring: Christoph Waltz; Vanessa Redgrave; Annette Bening; Corey Hawkins
- Cinematography: Henry Braham
- Edited by: Brett M. Reed
- Music by: Lorne Balfe
- Production companies: Romulus Entertainment; Metalwork Pictures; Cornerstone Films; Gerson Films; RatPac Entertainment
- Distributed by: Vertical Entertainment
- Release dates: April 27, 2019 (Tribeca); May 14, 2021 (United States)
- Running time: 99 minutes
- Country: United States
- Language: English
- Box office: $39,163

Georgetown is a 2019 American crime drama film directed by Christoph Waltz (in his feature directorial debut) and written by David Auburn. It is based on Franklin Foer's 2012 New York Times Magazine article "The Worst Marriage in Georgetown", which details the 2011 murder of 91-year-old socialite Viola Herms Drath by her much-younger second husband in the Georgetown neighborhood of Washington, D.C. Waltz stars alongside Vanessa Redgrave, Annette Bening and Corey Hawkins.

It had its world premiere at the Tribeca Film Festival on April 27, 2019. It received a limited release in the United States on May 14, 2021, by Vertical Entertainment.

The film opens with an on-screen disclaimer:

This story does not, in any way, claim to be the truth. Nonetheless it is inspired by real events.

The plot is based on and is a fictionalized account of the 2011 murder of Viola Herms Drath by her husband Albrecht Gero Muth. In the movie, Ulrich Mott, an ambitious, grandiose, and dishonest social climber becomes the main suspect in the death of his wealthy and much older wife, Elsa Breht.

== Plot ==
This summary is set out in chronological order, unlike the order in the film itself.

Ulrich Mott, a 50-year-old conman and social climber, is working as an intern for a U.S. congressman when he uses the congressman’s ID card to gain entry to a banquet. There, by chance, he meets Elsa Breht, a wealthy, elderly socialite and journalist who lives in the Georgetown district of Washington, D.C. Claiming to be completing a doctorate in international relations, he arranges to have lunch with her.

When Elsa’s husband dies, she withdraws from society in her grief, to the great dismay of her daughter, Amanda. As Elsa watches the year 2000 being rung in on TV, Ulrich phones her and invites her to accompany him to a concert.

At a party, Amanda is happy that Elsa has regained her vitality, although she does not know what has happened. She tells Elsa she has been offered a position as a tenured law professor at Harvard University and invites Elsa to move with her to Boston. Elsa declines, at which point Ulrich announces to everyone, to Amanda’s dismay, that he and Elsa are to marry.

After their marriage, Elsa uses her personal contacts to help Ulrich advance his career as he develops a consulting agency, of which he is the only actual operative. Ulrich employs name-dropping and outright deceit to recruit numerous influential public figures as clients or as members of the agency’s board of directors.

In 2004, Ulrich tries to convince Iraqi diplomats to have him broker peace negotiations with their country’s enemies, but they humiliatingly reject his proposal. When he returns home drunk, he and Elsa have a physical altercation in which she almost falls down the stairs, but he holds her up. That night, he apologizes and explains what happened, telling her he thinks everyone in Washington is laughing at him.

Elsa begins to have doubts about Ulrich’s sexual orientation when she sees him leave a room at the same time as a young man. In 2006, in a New York hotel room, she finds him naked in bed with another man. After he throws her out of the room, she files a complaint with the police for assault.

Ulrich then disappears from Elsa’s life for two years aside from phone calls. He claims, including in emails to the U.S. State Department that its officials consider genuine, to be working as an independent peace envoy in Iraq. He eventually returns home and is considered to be a diplomatic miracle worker.

Following a dinner party at their house, Ulrich and Elsa get into an argument, after which he goes for a walk. He claims to have found her dead on returning home, but the police open a homicide investigation and charge him with murder.

Although Ulrich superficially cooperates with the investigation, he conceals relevant information from his lawyers that comes up in court, such as a false claim to be an officer in the Iraqi military, the 2006 criminal complaint and the fact that he stands to gain financially from Elsa’s will. He berates the lawyers for relying on him to do their due diligence, then continually misleads them about evidence that someone else killed Elsa, refusing even to tell them where he went the night of the murder. He ultimately dismisses them.

Ulrich goes on a hunger strike and is taken to hospital in a weakened state. His lawyers return to court to submit a motion to have him declared unfit for trial.

The truth is revealed in an epilogue. After Ulrich leaves the house the night of the murder, he meets with the man Elsa found him in bed with in New York and the man rebuffs him, telling him he is pathetic. When Ulrich returns home, Elsa is waiting for him at the top of the stairs and orders him out of the house. They argue, and she tells him she now knows what he was doing during his two-year absence: he was not in Iraq at all, but was working as a desk clerk at a Miami motel, while his work as a peace envoy was a complete fabrication. She calls him an idiot, and the scene ends with Ulrich rushing up the stairs toward her.

== Cast ==
- Christoph Waltz as Ulrich Mott (based upon the real-life murderer Albrecht Gero Muth)
- Vanessa Redgrave as Elsa Breht (based upon the real-life socialite Viola Herms Drath)
- Annette Bening as Amanda Breht
- Corey Hawkins as Daniel Volker
- Laura de Carteret as Eleanor Price
- Ian D. Clark as Carl Mattingly
- Saad Suddiqui as Zahari
- Ron Lea as Detective Reid
- Alexander Crowther as Matthew

== Production ==
It was announced in May 2015 that Christoph Waltz would make his feature directorial debut with The Worst Marriage in Georgetown, in which he would also star as the main character Ulrich Mott.

In May 2017, Vanessa Redgrave was cast in the film, now titled Georgetown, as the wealthy socialite Mott marries in order to up his social status. Annette Bening joined the film in September, with filming commencing in Toronto between August 3 and September 16, 2017.

== Release ==
It had its world premiere at the Tribeca Film Festival on April 27, 2019. Its earliest theatrical release was in Italy on June 16, 2020. It was released in the United States on May 14, 2021, in a limited release by Vertical Entertainment. It was released on video on demand on May 18, 2021, by Paramount Home Entertainment.

== Reception ==
=== Box office ===
Georgetown grossed $2,132 in Italy.

=== Critical response ===
On review aggregator Rotten Tomatoes, the film holds an approval rating of 63% based on 30 reviews, with an average rating of 6.3/10. On Metacritic, it holds a weighted average score of 49 out of 100, based on eight critics, indicating "mixed or average" reviews.

John DeFore of The Hollywood Reporter praised the film, noting that "it's the kind of serious but broadly appealing, modestly scaled picture that people love to say doesn't exist any more."

In The New York Times, Calum Marsh praised Waltz's performance, saying that "he is a pleasure to watch."
