= Waleed Zuaiter =

American actor and producer

- وليد زعيتر
- Born: Sacramento, California, U.S.
- Education: George Washington University
- Occupations: Actor, producer

Waleed F. Zuaiter (Arabic: وليد زعيتر) is an American actor, of Palestinian descent, and producer who has performed in on-stage productions in Washington, D.C.; Berkeley, California; and New York City, as well as several film and television productions. He is the producer and co-star of Omar (2013), which was nominated for an Oscar at the 86th Academy Awards for Best Foreign Language Film.

== Early life ==
Waleed Zuaiter, an American with Palestinian ancestry, was born in Sacramento, California, but grew up in Kuwait.

He returned to the United States to earn his degree in philosophy and theatre at George Washington University, in Washington, D.C..

== Career ==
Zuaiter began his acting career with several productions in Washington, before relocating to New York City.

On the New York stage, he received critical acclaim for his portrayal of a former Iraqi translator for the U.S. military, in George Packer's Betrayed. He also has starred in David Greig's The American Pilot at the Manhattan Theatre Club, Tony Kushner's Homebody/Kabul, Ilan Hatsor's Masked, Eliam Kraiem's Sixteen Wounded, and Victoria Brittain and Gillian Slovo's Guantanamo: Honor Bound to Defend Freedom. He performed alongside Meryl Streep and Kevin Kline in Mother Courage at the Public Theater.

Zuaiter has produced the annual New York Arab-American Comedy Festival and has been a member of the Arab-American theater collective NIBRAS.

Zuaiter's film and television productions include the HBO/BBC miniseries House of Saddam, Sex and the City 2, and The Men Who Stare at Goats, in which he played the role of Mahmud Daash. In the 2011 suspense-thriller Elevator, directed by Stig Svendsen, he plays a man trapped in a Wall Street elevator with several people, one of whom has a bomb.

Zuaiter produced and starred in Omar, a thriller written and directed by Hany Abu-Assad (Paradise Now). The film was selected as the Palestinian entry for the Best Foreign Language Film at the 86th Academy Awards, and was nominated for an Academy Award. It also won Best Feature Film at the 2013 Asian Pacific Screen Awards.

He also was featured in an NBC Universal Pilot written by Tom Fontana and Barry Levinson and directed by Spike Lee, starring Bobby Cannavale. Alongside Bobby Cannavale, Waleed's son, Laith Zuaiter, was featured in the pilot. Waleed Zuaiter starred in London Has Fallen as Kamran Barkawi, Aamir Barkawi's son and henchman and second in command of a terrorist strike.

He starred as the recurring character Samir Abboud in the Netflix adaptation of the novel Altered Carbon. Zuaiter starred in Billionaire Boys Club as The Persian, Hedayat Eslaminia and Izzy’s Father. In 2019, Waleed Zuaiter starred in Netflix limited series The Spy, as the Syrian Colonel Amin al-Hafiz.

In 2020, he played the role of a former Iraqi police officer collaborating with US forces while trying to find his missing daughter in the series Baghdad Central. The role earned him a leading actor nomination in the 2021 British Academy Television Awards.

In 2021, he starred as Hassan Asfour, senior Palestine Liberation Organization negotiator, in the HBO film Oslo about the negotiations that led to the Oslo I Accord.

In 2022 Zuaiter starred as Koba, a Georgian assassin and crime boss, in the second season of Gangs of London, a London crime drama series airing on Sky Atlantic in the UK and Germany, and on AMC in the US.

== Filmography ==
=== Film ===
Year	Title	Role	Notes
2000	Eat Me!	Barry	
2003	Justice	Saeed	
2004	Jihad!	Salaam	
2007	The Visitor	Omar	
2009	Veronika Decides to Die	Lecturer	
2009	The Men Who Stare at Goats	Mahmud Daash	
2010	Sex and the City 2	Shahib	
2011	Elevator	Mohammed	
2012	The United	Waleed Zaki	
2013	Omar	Agent Rami	Also producer
2015	Parisienne	L'oncle Simon	
2016	The Free World	Khalil	
2016	London Has Fallen	Kamran Barkawi	
2016	Jimmy Vestvood: Amerikan Hero	Malek	
2016	Namour	Nabil	
2016	20th Century Women	Charlie	
2018	Here and Now	Sami	
2018	Billionaire Boys Club	The Persian / Izzy's Dad	
2018	The Angel	Gamal Abdel Nasser	
2018	Saint Judy	Omar	
2019	William	Dr. Julian Reed	
2021	Amira	Said	
TBA	Alien Boy	Farouk	Post-production

=== Television ===
Year	Title	Role	Notes
2002, 2008	Rani Khan / Khalid	Rani Khan / Khalid	2 episodes
2007	The Unit	Man with Red Envelope	Episode: "M.P.s"
2007	M.O.N.Y.	Achmil Durrani	Television film
2008	House of Saddam	Adnan Hamdani	Episode #1.1
2009	Lie to Me	Deputy Ambassador Rafid	Episode: "The Best Policy"
2010	NCIS: Los Angeles	Thierry / Sheik	Episode: "Black Widow"
2010	Blue Bloods	Adam Hassan	Episode: "What You See"
2011	Homeland	Afsal Hamid	Episode: "Blind Spot"
2011	The Good Wife	Danny Marwat	Episode: "Executive Order 13224"
2011	Lost and Found	Raj	Television film
2012	Political Animals	Ambassador Serkan	Episode: "Second Time Around"
2012	Common Law	Aram Parisian	Episode: "Hot for Teacher"
2013–2014	Revolution	Martin Shaw	4 episodes
2014	Legends	Faris Nader	Episode: "Iconoclast"
2014	The Blacklist	Dr. Daniel Rivera	Episode: "The Scimitar (No. 22)"
2015	House of Cards	Kaseem Mahmoud	Episode: "Chapter 30"
2015	Masters of Sex	Mohammad aka Shah of Iran	Episode: "Three's a Crowd"
2016	Madam Secretary	Prime Minister Khoosat	2 episodes
2016	Good Behavior	Chase Rochefort	2 episodes
2017	Chicago Justice	Amir Nasiri	Episode: "See Something"
2017	Prison Break	Mohammad El Tunis	2 episodes
2018	Altered Carbon	Samir Abboud	6 episodes
2018	Colony	Vincent	4 episodes
2019	The Spy	Colonel Amin al-Hafiz	5 episodes
2020	Baghdad Central	Muhsin Kadr al-Khafaji	6 episodes
2020	Ramy	Yassir	Episode: "Uncle Naseem"
2021	Oslo	Hassan Asfour	Television film
2022	Gangs of London	Koba	6 episodes
2025	The Girlfriend	Howard Sanderson	6 episodes
2026	High Value Target: The Hunt for Saddam	Saddam Hussein	2 episodes
