= Viola Herms Drath =

German-American writer (1920–2011)

- Born: Viola Herms; February 8, 1920; Düsseldorf, Germany
- Died: August 11, 2011 (aged 91); Washington, D.C., United States
- Cause of death: Homicide
- Education: University of Nebraska (M.A.)
- Occupations: Journalist, writer
- Known for: Authored eight textbooks read in over 150 colleges and universities
- Spouses: Francis S. Drath (m. 1947; died 1986) Albrecht Gero Muth (m. 1990)
- Children: 2
- Awards: William J. Flynn Initiative for Peace Award from the National Committee on American Foreign Policy (2005)

Viola Herms Drath (February 8, 1920 – August 11, 2011) was a Washington, D.C., author, socialite and a German-American member of the National Committee on American Foreign Policy for over thirty years. She was murdered, at age 91, by her second husband, Albrecht Gero Muth.

== Early life ==
Drath was born in Düsseldorf, Germany, on February 8, 1920. She is reported to have learned English from vacations and boarding school in Scotland. In 1946, during her time working in Munich, Drath met U.S. Army Lt. Col. Francis S. Drath while visiting Lake Constance in Switzerland; he was, at the time, the deputy military governor of Bavaria. Within the year, the couple were married and had moved to Lincoln, Nebraska, his hometown. The Draths had two children together, daughters Connie (born 1948) and Francesca (born 1952).

== Career ==
In 1946, in Germany, she was a playwright, with one of her early productions, Farewell Isabell, staged in Straubing's Municipal Theater and in Munich.

During the post-World War II period, Drath worked as a German interpreter in Munich, in the office of her soon-to-be husband, who was the deputy military governor of Bavaria.

After moving to Lincoln, Nebraska, with her first husband, she attended the University of Nebraska, where she studied for an advanced degree in literature and philosophy. While in Nebraska, she was an editor of Die Weltpost in Omaha, commentator for KUON-TV, and correspondent for the National Observer. Later she was an American correspondent for the German magazine Madame.

In 1968, Drath became a political correspondent for the German newspaper Handelsblatt. During this time, Drath and her first husband moved to Washington, DC, where Col. Drath was a legislative liaison with the Selective Service. They bought a house at 3206 Q Street, Northwest, in the Georgetown district in northwest Washington, D.C.

Sonia Adler hired Drath to write for the Washington Dossier, where she wrote about "political gossip, lifestyle advice, and culture, explored a diverse cross-section of the city's fine-art world.

As a member of the executive committee of the National Committee on American Foreign Policy, she was described as a "notable figure in German-American relations for over thirty years." Her 1988 article for the National Committee, The Reemergence of the German Question, proposed negotiations on German unification between the two German states and the four Allied Powers.

Drath was a foreign policy adviser during the 1988 Bush campaign , where she helped "lay the groundwork which led to the "2+4" process towards German unification in 1990". In 1989, Drath met President George H. W. Bush.

During her life, she authored eight textbooks read in over 150 colleges and universities. She taught at American University and lectured at the University of Southern California. Her articles and commentaries were published in American Foreign Policy Interests, The Washington Times, Commentary, Businessweek, The Chicago Tribune, Strategic Review, The National Observer, Frankfurter Allgemeine Zeitung, Das Parlament, and Der Spiegel.

=== Social activities ===
She was a member of the White House Commission on Remembrance, co-chair of the Berlin Air Lift Diamond Jubilee Committee, coordinator of the International Consultative Mechanism on Remembrance, and National Coordinator of National Observance to Mark Iraq Liberation Day.

=== Diplomatic activities ===
During Drath's life, she was:

- Advisor and member of the Delegation of the Republic of Cyprus to the First Committee, 51st United Nations General Assembly,
- Advisor, Member of the Delegation of the Republic of Cyprus to the 2001 UN Conference on the Illicit Trade in Small Arms and Light Weapons, in All Its Aspects,
- Advisor, Member of the Delegation of the Republic of Cyprus to the 2006 Conference to Review Implementation of the 2001 Programme of Action to Eradicate the Illicit Proliferation of Small Arms and Light Weapons, in All Its Aspects,
- Observer, Bamako Convocation of the Eminent Persons Group in Bamako, Mali,
- Special Advisor, Delegation of the United States to the 17th Organization of America States General Assembly,
- Observer, 4th United Nations Meeting of the International Commission on Verification and Security, and
- Observer, Esquipulas II.

== Murder ==
Drath's first husband, Francis Drath, died on January 11, 1986. In the early 1980s, Viola met Albrecht Gero Muth, 44 years her junior, then an unpaid intern from Germany.

Four years after the death of her husband, Drath, then 70 years old, married the 26-year-old Muth.

After their marriage, Muth fabricated a story that an elderly German Count had fallen from an elephant in India and needed to appoint a successor before dying—from that point forward, Muth insisted on being called Count Albrecht. Following the 2003 commencement of the Iraq War, Muth suddenly adopted the rank, and wore the uniform, of a brigadier general in the Iraqi Army, organizing diplomatic events in DC that he claimed were for the new Iraqi regime. In April 2011, Muth somehow arranged a ceremony at Arlington National Cemetery to honor fallen American soldiers in Iraq, supposedly on behalf of the Iraqi regime.

Early in the marriage, Muth started a pattern of domestic violence against Drath, inducing repeated police visits to the Q Street home. On August 11, 2011, Drath was found dead in the bathroom of her Q Street home. Muth was held at St. Elizabeths Hospital, where he was initially found incompetent to stand trial after being diagnosed with schizotypal personality disorder and a delusional disorder. In a report submitted to the court, forensic psychologist Mitchell Hugonnet concluded that Muth had narcissistic personality disorder but was not mentally ill. In 2014, Muth was convicted of murdering his wife and was sentenced to 50 years in prison. Judge Russell F. Canan's remarks before sentencing described Muth as "a common serial domestic violence abuser, made worse when he drinks, who subjected Ms. Drath to many years of abuse."

== Cultural legacy ==
Author Warren Adler acknowledged Drath in his novel The War of the Roses.

In 2015, it was announced that Christoph Waltz would direct and star in the film The Worst Marriage in Georgetown (retitled Georgetown before its release), based on the true crime story of the murder of Viola Drath. The film premiered at the Tribeca Film Festival on April 27, 2019, and was released theatrically in the United States on May 14, 2021.

== Awards ==
- William J. Flynn Initiative for Peace Award from the National Committee on American Foreign Policy (2005) for promoting German reunification
- Recipient of the Iraqi Minister of Defense Commendation Medal
- Honorary Member, Berlin Air Lift Veterans Association
- ranking among the 700 Great Nebraskans
- inducted into the Nebraska Journalism Hall of Fame
- Honorable Mention for Writing by the Association of American University Women
- Honorary Citizen of Dallas, Texas

== Bibliography ==
- A Thoroughly Muddled Marriage: Report of an Inmate, an unpublished and previously undisclosed memoir
- The German State in Historical Perspective, Germany in World Politics by Viola Herms Drath (ed.), New York, 1979
- Willy Brandt: Prisoner Of His Past by Viola Helms Drath (which Dr. Henry A. Kissinger said was "a must read for those interested in fully appreciating an important statesman both within his own times and beyond.")
- Farewell Isabell, a comedy play
- No Reliance upon a Woman?, a comedy play
- Toward a New Atlanticism, (article in the Washington Times)
- Time to Reinvent the Alliance, (article in the Washington Times)
- Engagement and Provocation, (published by Macmillan)
- What do the Germans Want?, (published by Macmillan)
- Reporter in Deutschland, a reader for beginners
