= Tobie (disambiguation) =

Tobie is an 1854 oratorio by Charles Gounod.

Tobie may also refer to:

== People ==
=== Given name ===
- Tobie Aupindi, Namibian politician
- Tobie Botes (born 1984), South African rugby union player, played for Italy
- Tobie Donovan, English actor
- Tobie Grant (1887–1968), philanthropist in Georgia, United States
- Tobie Matthew (1577–1655), English politician and Catholic priest
- Tobie McGann (born 1982), Australian rugby union player
- Tobie Meyer, South African politician in the 1980s–90s
- Tobie Mimboe (born 1964), Cameroonian footballer
- Tobie Puttock (born 1974), Australian celebrity chef
- Tobie Marier Robitaille, Canadian cinematographer
- Tobie Smith (born 1973), American swimmer
- Tobie Steinhouse (born 1925), Canadian artist

=== Surname ===
- Edward Parsons Tobie Jr. (1838–1900), Union soldier in the American Civil War
- Frances Matthew (1550–1629), English benefactor of York Minster
- Jean-Michel Tobie (born 1948), French mayor

== Other ==
- French form of the name Tobias

== See also ==
- Toby (disambiguation)
- Tobi (disambiguation)
- Tobey
