= Small Potatoes =

Small Potatoes may refer to:

== Television ==
- "Small Potatoes", a 1978 episode of Hawaii Five-O
- "Small Potatoes" (The X-Files), a television episode
- "Small Potatoes" (9-1-1: Nashville), a television episode
- Small Potatoes (1999 TV series), a British sitcom
- Small Potatoes (2011 TV series), a children's show
- Small Potatoes: Who Killed the USFL?, an ESPN 30 for 30 documentary film

== Other uses ==
- "Small Potatoes", a song by Gale Garnett
- Small Potatoes, a poetry collection by Mary Norton Kratt
- Small Potatoes, a comic strip by Paul Madonna
- Small Potatoes Urban Delivery, original name for the online grocer Spud

== See also ==
- Meet the Small Potatoes, a 2013 mockumentary family film based on the 2011 children's series
- Glossary of early twentieth century slang in the United States
- Potato
