= Little Airplane Productions =

Defunct American television production company

- Final logo, used from 2021 to 2023
- Type: Division
- Industry: Television production Animation
- Founded: 1999; 27 years ago
- Founders: Josh Selig; Lori Shaer
- Defunct: June 1, 2023; 3 years ago
- Fate: Folded into Studio 100
- Headquarters: New York City, New York
- Key people: Josh Selig (former CEO); Lori Shaer; Jennifer Oxley; Jeffrey Lesser; Sharon Gomes (former COO)
- Products: Oobi; Wonder Pets! 3rd & Bird; Small Potatoes; Doctor Space; Super Wings
- Parent: Studio 100 (2017–2023)

Little Airplane Productions was an American animation studio & television production company co-founded by Josh Selig and Lori Shaer (née Sherman) in 1999. The company produced Oobi for Noggin, Wonder Pets! for Nickelodeon, and 3rd & Bird for the BBC. It also released independent short films. In 2017, the company was bought by the Belgian-based Studio 100, which entered a co-production agreement to create the comedy series Doctor Space with Little Airplane.

The company's main studio was located in New York City's South Street Seaport. Filming, animation, design, and storyboarding work were completed in a 12,000 square feet (1,100 m^{2}) building. The studio also had a recording facility for voice-over and music. In mid-2007, the company opened new studios in London and Abu Dhabi, following the announcement of 3rd & Bird.

Lori Shaer left Little Airplane in 2002, but she continued to be given a "special thanks" credit on the second and third seasons of Oobi. Josh Selig left the company in 2020.

In June 2023, Studio 100 announced that Little Airplane would be "closing shop" and that its studio space would be replaced by a new company called "Terribly Terrific! Productions" (founded by former Art Directors from Little Airplane).

== History ==
Both Josh Selig and Lori Shaer (named Lori Sherman until her marriage) worked for Sesame Workshop in the mid-1990s. After being laid off, Selig partnered with Shaer to open a studio in New York City. For the first year, they both worked out of a "one-room office in Tribeca" and did not make much money.

Selig explained that they called their payment formula "a third, a third and a third, meaning every time we finished a small production job, we would split whatever profit was left in the budget three ways. Lori got a third. I got a third. And Little Airplane got a third. That first year we both earned less than the guy washing our windows."

The name "Little Airplane" was derived from a 1994 short film that Selig had produced for Sesame Street called "I'm a Little Airplane." At first, Little Airplane only produced similar live-action content, including Oobi and a film called The Time-Out Chair. The studio did not create its own animation until creative director Jennifer Oxley joined the staff. She developed a style of animation called "photo-puppetry" that was used in many of the studio's later works, including Wonder Pets! and 3rd & Bird.

In September 2008 after Little Airplane Productions had established its own British animation production studio in London, England, Little Airplane Productions had created its film production arm entitled Little Airplane Films that would create & produce animated films for theartical releases with Little Airplane Productions' head of production Tom Brown would serve as head of Little Airplane Productions' newly formed film production arm Little Airplane Films

In October 2016 one year before Studio 100 acquire Little Airplane Productions in late 2017, Little Airplane Productions had partnered with German media rights management company M4E (whom Studio 100 would also acquire it in 2017) to produce & develop an 11-minute animated series entitled Rock! Taco! Balloon!, marking Little Airplane Productions' first German animated series, but that series went ultimately unproduced.

At the start of December 2017, Belgian production group Studio 100 announced the acquisition of New York-based American preschool animation production studio Little Airplane Productions in order for the former to expand into the USA, the acquisition of Little Airplane Productions had gained Studio 100 its own North American animation studio as the former became Studio 100's American animation production subsidiary with them developing and producing their new projects with Studio 100's fellow in-house animation production studios such as Studio 100 Animation alongside its Munich-based global distribution division Studio 100 Media distributing them whilst Little Airplane Production founder Josh Selig continued leading the New York-based American animation studios within Studio 100.

== Productions ==
=== Television series ===
- Oobi was the studio's first show. It starred a cast of bare-hand puppets, led by a boy named Oobi. It premiered on Noggin in 2000. The first season was made up of two-minute shorts, while the second and third seasons were made up of longer episodes spanning 10-13 minutes each.
- Go, Baby!, a series of shorts which aired in between shows on Playhouse Disney. It was originally pitched as a long-form television series using the same photo puppetry style as Wonder Pets!
- Wonder Pets! was the studio's second series, focusing on the adventures of three classroom pets as they help out animals in need. It ran for three seasons. It started out on Nickelodeon, but premieres moved to the separate Nick Jr. Channel during the third season. The rights to the show are currently owned by Paramount Skydance Corporation.
- 3rd & Bird is an animated series co-produced by Little Airplane Productions and CBeebies. The series premiered on CBeebies in July 2008 and aired in 18 territories abroad.
- Small Potatoes is an animated series about potatoes who sing songs. A feature-length film based on the series, Meet the Small Potatoes, aired in 2013.
- The Adventures of Napkin Man! is a series that combines live action and animation. It was created by Selig and Tone Thyne, and it premiered in 2013.
- The first two seasons of Earth to Luna! (Brazilian Portuguese: O Show da Luna!), a children's television series created and directed by Célia Catunda and Kiko Mistrorigo and co-produced by TV PinGuim, Discovery Kids Original Productions and Warner Bros. Discovery (season 8), that debuted on the American channel Sprout, on August 16, 2014. In Latin America, it debuted on October 13, 2014, on Discovery Kids. Each season consists of 26 episodes (11 minutes per episode). The target audience is children between the ages of four and nine years old.
- Little Airplane provided English voices and scripts for the first three seasons of Super Wings, an animated series about airplanes co-produced with FunnyFlux Entertainment in South Korea and Alpha Group in China.
- P. King Duckling is a co-production with Uyoung Animation, a Chinese company. The series premiered on Disney Junior on November 7, 2016.
- The Dog & Pony Show is an animated series created by Josh Selig and co-produced with RedKnot (a joint venture between Nelvana and Discovery).
- Doctor Space is an animated comedy pilot created and written by Selig and Billy Lopez. It was co-produced by Little Airplane, Studio 100, and Fantawild Animation. The pilot was being developed into a full series, but Little Airplane closed before the project could be completed.

=== Other ===
- The Time-Out Chair is a short film produced by the studio in 2002. The short was filmed in East Village, Manhattan and shown at the 2003 Tribeca Film Festival.
- Linny the Guinea Pig is a collection of two short films about a guinea pig who embarks on adventures. The shorts, which inspired the Wonder Pets! show, were aired on Nickelodeon in 2003.
- Little Airplane produced the animation for the song "Son of Man" in the 2006 Broadway production of Tarzan.
- Little Airplane produced a series of PSA commercials for the YMCA of Greater New York in 2010.
- Tobi! is a series of four-minute visual poems that aired on Treehouse TV in Canada.
- The Olive Branch was a multimedia project (both a book and a series of one-minute animations) about two characters who achieve conflict resolution, told without words.
- A Laurie Berkner Christmas, an album by Laurie Berkner, was recorded and mixed by Little Airplane Productions in 2012.

== Other work ==
=== Cancelled projects ===
The Wonder Pets! episode "Kalamazoo!" was intended to be a backdoor pilot for a spin-off series, centering on the character Ming-Ming and her brother Marvin. Selig pitched the spin-off to Nickelodeon after the final season of Wonder Pets! wrapped, but Nickelodeon did not pick up the spin-off or any additional episodes of the series.

In 2008, Sesame Workshop hired Little Airplane to "produce a bible for a series in development," but the project did not materialize.

In 2009, HIT Entertainment partnered with Little Airplane to develop and co-produce original series. Its first joint production, Billy Birthday Boy, which followed a young boy who saves birthday parties that go awry, was screened at MIPCOM Jr. in October 2011, though the series never ended up being materialized.

In October 2010, Little Airplane Productions signed a partnership with British global production & distribution company FremantleMedia via its distribution arm FremantleMedia Enterprises through its kids & family unit to produce an untitled television series with the latter would globally distribute it; however no news of that series has materialized since.

=== The Little Light Foundation ===
In 2009, Little Airplane Productions created a non-profit initiative called "The Little Light Foundation". The Foundation's first project was The Olive Branch, a multimedia project about conflict resolution, tolerance and mutual respect.

=== The Little Airplane Café ===
In the summer of 2009, Little Airplane Productions launched the Little Airplane Café. Laurie Berkner opened the restaurant in July 2009. Her performance was broadcast live on SiriusXM. Guests included Jon Scieszka, Milkshake, and Suzi Shelton.

=== The Little Airplane Academy ===
Little Airplane Academy offered a three-day workshop twice a year at the company's South Street Seaport studios. Participants learned the fundamentals of creating a preschool series including pitching, writing, character design, directing and producing live action and animated shows. In 2009, the Academy ran a one-day writing workshop with Susan Kim. Little Airplane has also hosted workshops in Qatar, England, and Norway.
