= Jeffrey Lesser (producer) =

American music producer

- Born: Jeffrey Lesser; New York City, New York, U.S.
- Occupation: Record producer
- Website: jeffreylesser.com

Jeffrey Lesser (born in New York City) is a music producer for Nickelodeon. He has received eleven Emmy Award nominations for his work on Wonder Pets!, winning four of them.

Lesser was a music director and producer at Little Airplane Productions for thirteen years. He has produced records for Barbra Streisand (Lazy Afternoon) and Loudon Wainwright III (History), among others.

== Biography ==
Jeffrey Lesser was born on the Upper West Side of New York City, where he also began his career.

He joined Little Airplane Productions in 2003 to work on later episodes of Oobi, and soon became the company's musical director, composing all pieces for the series 3rd & Bird, Small Potatoes, P. King Duckling, Wonder Pets! and others. He has also produced music for various theater productions, including The Rocky Horror Show, The Last Five Years, Tick, Tick... Boom! and Parade.

== Awards ==
Lesser has been nominated for eleven Creative Arts Daytime Emmy Awards, all for his work on the Wonder Pets! series.

Year	Presenter	Category/award	Work	Status	Ref.
2008	35th Daytime Emmy Awards	Outstanding Music Direction and Composition	Wonder Pets!	Won	
2009	36th Daytime Emmy Awards	Outstanding Music Direction and Composition	Wonder Pets!	Won	
2009	36th Daytime Emmy Awards	Outstanding Sound Editing - Live Action and Animation	Wonder Pets!	Nominated	
2010	37th Daytime Emmy Awards	Outstanding Music Direction and Composition	Wonder Pets!	Won	
2010	37th Daytime Emmy Awards	Outstanding Pre-School Children's Series	Wonder Pets!	Nominated	
2011	38th Daytime Emmy Awards	Outstanding Music Direction and Composition	Wonder Pets!	Nominated	
2012	39th Daytime Emmy Awards	Outstanding Pre-School Children's Series	Wonder Pets!	Nominated	
2012	39th Daytime Emmy Awards	Outstanding Music Direction and Composition	Wonder Pets!	Won	
2014	41st Daytime Emmy Awards	Outstanding Music Direction and Composition	Wonder Pets!	Nominated	
2014	41st Daytime Emmy Awards	Outstanding Pre-School Children's Animated Program	Wonder Pets!	Nominated	
