= 37th Annie Awards =

US media awards ceremony held in 2010

- Date: February 6, 2010
- Site: Royce Hall; Los Angeles, California, U.S.
- Hosted by: William Shatner
- Organized by: ASIFA-Hollywood

Highlights
- Best Animated Feature: Up
- Best Direction: Pete Docter; Up
- Most awards: The Princess and the Frog, Prep & Landing, and Coraline (3)
- Most nominations: Coraline (10)

The 37th Annual Annie Awards, honoring the best in animation for 2009, were held on February 6, 2010, at Royce Hall in Los Angeles, California.

== Production category nominees ==
Nominations announced on December 1, 2009

=== Best Animated Feature ===
- Up
- Cloudy with a Chance of Meatballs
- Coraline
- Fantastic Mr. Fox
- The Princess and the Frog
- The Secret of Kells

=== Best Home Entertainment Production ===
- Futurama: Into the Wild Green Yonder
- Curious George: A Very Monkey Christmas
- Green Lantern: First Flight
- Open Season 2
- SpongeBob vs. the Big One

=== Best Animated Short Subject ===
- Robot Chicken: Star Wars 2.5 - shadowMachine
- Pups of Liberty - Picnic Pictures
- Santa, The Fascist Years - Plymptoons
- The Rooster, the Crocodile and the Night Sky - Barley Films
- The Story of Walls - Badmash Animation Studios

=== Best Animated Television Commercial ===
- Spanish Lottery - "Deportees" - Acme Filmworks
- Goldfish - In the Dark
- Idaho Lottery - "Twiceland" - Acme Filmworks'
- McDonald's - "Nutty Trade" - Blue Sky Studios
- The Spooning - Screen Novelties/Acne Media

=== Best Animated Television Production ===
- Prep and Landing - ABC Family/Walt Disney Animation Studios
- Glenn Martin, DDS - Tornante/Cuppa Coffee Studios/Rogers Communications
- Merry Madagascar - DreamWorks Animation
- The Simpsons - 20th Century Fox/Gracie Films

=== Best Animated Television Production for Children ===
- The Penguins of Madagascar - Nickelodeon Productions/DreamWorks Animation
- Mickey Mouse Clubhouse - Disney Television Animation
- SpongeBob SquarePants - Nickelodeon Productions
- The Marvelous Misadventures of Flapjack - Cartoon Network Studios
- The Mighty B! - Nickelodeon Productions/Polka Dot Pictures/Paper Kite Productions

== Individual achievement category nominees ==
=== Animated Effects ===
- The Princess and the Frog - James Mansfield
- Cloudy with a Chance of Meatballs - Tom Kluyskens
- Monsters vs. Aliens - Scott Cegielski
- 9 – Alexander Feigin
- Up - Eric Froemling

=== Character Animation in a Television Production ===
- Mark Donald - Bob's Big Break
- Mark Mitchell - Prep and Landing
- Kevan Shorey - Merry Madagascar
- Tony Smeed - Prep and Landing
- Philip To - Monsters vs Aliens: Mutant Pumpkins From Outer Space

=== Character Design in a Feature Production ===
- Coraline – Shane Prigmore
- Coraline – Shannon Tindle
- Up – Daniel Lopez Munoz

=== Character Design in a Television Production ===
- Bill Schwab - Prep & Landing
- Benjamin Balistreri - Foster's Home for Imaginary Friends
- Bryan Arnett - The Mighty B
- Craig Kellman - Merry Madagascar

=== Directing in a Television Production ===
- Bret Haaland – The Penguins of Madagascar – Launchtime
- Pam Cooke, Jansen Yee – American Dad: Brains, Brains & Automobiles
- Rob Fendler – Popzilla
- John Infantino, J. G. Quintel – The Marvelous Misadventures of Flapjack: Candy Casanova
- Jennifer Oxley – The Wonder Pets: Help The Monster

=== Directing in a Feature Production ===
- Pete Docter – Up
- Phil Lord and Chris Miller – Cloudy with a Chance of Meatballs
- Henry Selick – Coraline
- Wes Anderson – Fantastic Mr. Fox
- Hayao Miyazaki – Ponyo on the Cliff by the Sea (Gake no ue no Ponyo)

=== Music in a Television Production ===
- Guy Moon - The Fairly OddParents: Wishology - The Big Beginning
- Michael Giacchino - Prep & Landing
- Kevin Kiner - Star Wars: The Clone Wars - Weapons Factory

=== Music in a Feature Production ===
- Coraline – Bruno Coulais
- Ponyo on the Cliff by the Sea (Gake no ue no Ponyo) – Joe Hisaishi
- Ice Age: Dawn of the Dinosaurs – John Powell
- Up – Michael Giacchino

=== Production Design in a Television Production ===
Mac George - Prep & Landing

Andy Harkness - Prep & Landing

Janice Kubo - Foster's Home for Imaginary Friends

=== Production Design in a Feature Production ===
- Coraline – Tadahiro Uesugi
- 9 – Christophe Vacher
- Coraline – Chris Appelhans
- The Princess and the Frog – Ian Gooding

=== Voice Acting in a Television Production ===
- SpongeBob's Truth or Square - Tom Kenny
- Merry Madagascar - Danny Jacobs
- Chowder: The Dinner Theater - Nicky Jones
- Chowder: The Party Cruse - Dwight Schultz
- Merry Madagascar - Willow Smith

=== Voice Acting in a Feature Production ===
- The Princess and the Frog - Jennifer Cody
- Coraline - Dawn French
- Monsters vs. Aliens - Hugh Laurie
- Ice Age: Dawn of the Dinosaurs - John Leguizamo
- The Princess and the Frog - Jenifer Lewis

=== Writing in a Feature Production ===
- Fantastic Mr. Fox – Wes Anderson and Noah Baumbach
- Astro Boy – David Bowers and Timothy Harris
- Cloudy with a Chance of Meatballs – Phil Lord and Christopher Miller
- Up – Pete Docter, Tom McCarthy and Bob Peterson

== Juried award winners ==
- Special Achievement: Martin Meunier and Brian McLean
- Winsor McCay Award: Tim Burton, Bruce Timm, Jeffrey Katzenberg
- Ub Iwerks Award: William Reeves
- June Foray Award: Tom Sito
- Certificate of Merit: Myles Mikulic, Danny Young, and Michael Woodside
