= Wonder Pets: In the City =

2024 American children's television series

- Genre: Adventure; Children's television; Musical; Comedy; Preschool
- Based on: Wonder Pets! by Josh Selig
- Developed by: Jennifer Oxley
- Voices of: Victoria Scola-Giampapa; Christopher Sean Cooper Jr.; Vanessa Huszár
- Countries of origin: United States; Ireland
- Original language: English
- No. of seasons: 2
- No. of episodes: 26

Production
- Executive producers: Jennifer Oxley; Steve Altiere
- Production companies: Nickelodeon Animation Studio; Snowflake Films; Kavaleer Productions

Original release
- Network: Apple TV+
- Release: December 13, 2024
- Network: Apple TV
- Release: March 20, 2026

Wonder Pets: In the City is a 2024 animated children's television series. It is a standalone sequel to the original Wonder Pets! and follows a new team of pets living in a large city environment. It premiered on December 13, 2024, on Apple TV+. The second season was released on March 20, 2026.

== Characters ==
=== Wonder Pets ===
- Izzy (voiced by Victoria Scola-Giampapa) is a light brown guinea pig. Similar to Linny, she's the most intelligent one of the new Wonder Pets, as she is usually seen giving Tate and Zuri insight as to where they will be traveling and about the animal, creature, or friend that they are saving. Whereas Linny keeps her cool, Izzy is shown to be prone to her emotions more, such as being bummed or frustrated. Otherwise, Izzy is very encouraging in that she wants her friends to move past their struggles. She is more energetic, punky, and even rash in demeanor, as she loves to pretend that she's riffing an electric guitar and mimic its sounds. It is even evident in her mannerisms, as when she pronounces particular things as "super," "mega," or "awesome," or even a combination of the three. Besides just celery, Izzy also offers more snacks for the others to eat after their missions, such as broccoli and cucumber.
- Tate (voiced by Christopher Sean Cooper Jr.) is a green rat snake. Much like Tuck, he's very caring and sensitive, especially towards his friends and those that he meets and saves. If anything, he is more fragile compared to Tuck because he likes to be quiet and touches nerves with others very easily. He is very hygienic and wants to keep his scales clean and is shown to be lonely without his friends around to keep him company. Also like Tuck, in a couple of episodes, he is seen wearing the former's classic sailor's cap as a reference to the other character.
- Zuri (voiced by Vanessa Huszár) is a black bunny. As is Ming-Ming for her group, Zuri provides a lot of the show's silliness and comedy, but unlike the former, she is a lot nicer and hardly ever uses snarky behavior or sarcasm. She is also a lot more active and mobile, so much so that she can be a little reckless. She also does have a tendency to get distracted or sidelined from the task at hand. Whenever the group has trouble locating an animal, she uses her ears to listen for their sounds. Like Ming-Ming, she also has a catchphrase that she says whenever something is gravely serious or dangerous, wherein she says, "Unbelievable!"

=== Recurring ===
- Baby Chick is a chicken that hatched in the end of the "Save the Runaway Egg!" She is revisited in "Save the Baby Chick!" where she has trouble speaking up to her siblings in order to feast on some chicken feed. She eventually musters up the courage to speak with the help of the Wonder Pets, knowing now that the others can finally listen to her.
- The Songbirds are a duo of birds who love to sing in harmony together who first appear in "Save the Songbirds!" They reappear again in "Help the Songbirds... Write a Song!" where they visit the Wonder Pets' classroom to write a new song about them.
- Pearl is a rat who lives in a sewer grate in New York City who first meets and befriends the Wonder Pets in the episode "Save Tate?" She is a scavenger who roams New York City to find things for her collection. She reappears in "Help the Theater Mouse!" as the production manager for the Animal Theater and in "Save the Red Balloon!" where she helps the Wonder Pets and a bunch of other animals to retrieve the runaway red balloon.
- Pizza Kitty is a cat who wants to cook a special pizza for the Wonder Pets in "Help Pizza Kitty!" He shows up again in "Save the Red Balloon!" where he tries to catch a balloon with the Wonder Pets and their friends.
- The Garden Bugs are a trio of insects, more specifically, a bee, a stick bug, and a roly poly, who the Wonder Pets first meet in "Save the Roly Poly!" They are revisited in "Help the Slimy Slug!" where they are revealed to be the playmates of the titular slug who live in the garden and play games with him.
- Little Hippo is a young hippopotamus who was originally stuck in the mud in "Save the Hippo!" She is the same hippo who is best friends with a young elephant who does not want to move away from his friend in "Save the Savanna Friends!"

=== Guest stars ===
- Spider - Season 1, Episode 11 (voiced by Isaac McKee) is a baby Golden Silk Orb-Weaver (Nephila) who desperately wants to weave a web before her dad gets home. She is in a big hurry, so her web keeps falling apart. The Wonder Pets teach her how to take a breath, slow down, and build a web that wows. Isaac McKee also plays the role of a Classroom Boy in this episode.
- Luca - Season 2, Episode 5 (voiced by William Luke III) is Zuri's cousin visiting her and her friends for the day. He wants to prove that he can make a great Wonder Pet, just like Ollie the Rabbit in the original series, but he tends to get a bit self-centered before he learns what it really takes to be part of a team.

== Series overview ==
| Season | Episodes | Originally released |
|---|---|---|
| 1 | 13 | December 13, 2024 |
| 2 | 13 | March 20, 2026 |

== Episodes ==
=== Season 1 (2024) ===
| No. overall | No. in season | Title | Written by | Original release date |
|---|---|---|---|---|
| 1 | 1 | "Save the Porcupine!" | Steve Altiere | December 13, 2024 |
| 1 | 1 | "Save the Runaway Egg!" | Steve Altiere | December 13, 2024 |
A porcupine gets stuck in a tight spot, and a mother chicken's precious egg rolls away.
| 2 | 2 | "Save the Mountain Lion!" | Katherine Chilson | December 13, 2024 |
| 2 | 2 | "Save the Baby Chick!" | Susan Kim | December 13, 2024 |
A mountain lion aims a little too high for his size, and a hungry chick struggles to be seen and heard.
| 3 | 3 | "Save the Woodpecker!" | Bar Ben-Yossef | December 13, 2024 |
| 3 | 3 | "Save the Salmon!" | Steve Altiere | December 13, 2024 |
A woodpecker can't shake free from a tree, and a young salmon needs some uplifting words to make it upstream.
| 4 | 4 | "Save the Hedgehog!" | Katherine Chilson | December 13, 2024 |
| 4 | 4 | "Save the Hippo!" | Steve Altiere | December 13, 2024 |
A hedgehog becomes a "wedged-hog," and a hippopotamus's cooldown turns into a muddy mess.
| 5 | 5 | "Help the Peacock!" | Everest Varanasi | December 13, 2024 |
| 5 | 5 | "Save the Woolly Mammoth!" | Steve Altiere | December 13, 2024 |
A peacock questions his dancing abilities, and a woolly mammoth gets trapped on a chunk of ice.
| 6 | 6 | "Save Tate?" | Tone Thyne | December 13, 2024 |
| 6 | 6 | "Save the Song Birds!" | Cynthia Reynoso | December 13, 2024 |
A search for a souvenir lands Tate inside a sidewalk grate, and two songbirds need to find their rhythm.
| 7 | 7 | "Help the Bear Cub!" | Gloria Shen | December 13, 2024 |
| 7 | 7 | "Save the Sad Sumi-e Frog!" | Melinda LaRose | December 13, 2024 |
A bear cub would rather play all day than go to bed, and a painted frog could use some cheering up.
| 8 | 8 | "Save the Roly Poly!" | Charise Sowells | December 13, 2024 |
| 8 | 8 | "Save Jack (and the Giant, Too)!" | Susan Kim | December 13, 2024 |
A lonely pill bug looks for a pal, and Jack goes on the run from a much (much) bigger kid.
| 9 | 9 | "Save the Elephant!" | Dena Diamond | December 13, 2024 |
| 9 | 9 | "Help the Little Hawk!" | Melinda LaRose | December 13, 2024 |
A thirsty elephant who is blind needs to find the watering hole, and a young hawk tries tackling an impressive move.
| 10 | 10 | "Save the Screaming Goat!" | Ed Lee | December 13, 2024 |
| 10 | 10 | "Help the Wild Culpeo!" | Lauren Monroe | December 13, 2024 |
A dwarf goat has a serious case of the yelps, and an energetic culpeo is eager to play with a delicate butterfly.
| 11 | 11 | "Save the Chinchilla!" | Everest Varanasi | December 13, 2024 |
| 11 | 11 | "Help the Golden Spider?" | Dena Diamond | December 13, 2024 |
A chinchilla needs rescuing from a tricky spot, and a spider wants to spin a web that will wow.
| 12 | 12 | "Help the Caribbean Crab!" | Teresa Lee | December 13, 2024 |
| 12 | 12 | "Save the Bighorn Sheep!" | Katherine Chilson | December 13, 2024 |
A crab's colorful castle risks getting washed away, and two sibling bighorn sheep fight over who goes first.
| 13 | 13 | "Help the Red Squirrel!" | Bar Ben-Yossef | December 13, 2024 |
| 13 | 13 | "Help the Dung Beetle!" | Bar Ben-Yossef | December 13, 2024 |
A red squirrel loses track of a buried treat, and a dung beetle battles a blowfly over a ball of dung.

=== Season 2 (2026) ===
| No. overall | No. in season | Title | Written by | Original release date |
|---|---|---|---|---|
| 14 | 1 | "Help the Theater Mouse!" | Kevin Del Aguila | March 20, 2026 |
| 14 | 1 | "Save the Origami Bunny!" | Annie Nishida | March 20, 2026 |
A mouse learns there are no small parts in the play--even for small critters--and the trio constructs an origami boat for a paper bunny.
| 15 | 2 | "Help Pizza Kitty!" | Everest Varanasi | March 20, 2026 |
| 15 | 2 | "Save the Tropical Fishie!" | Kellie R. Griffin | March 20, 2026 |
The team learns that the perfect pizza is one made with friends, and a little fish needs help getting to school on time.
| 16 | 3 | "Save the Sleeping Cutie!" | Caitlin Hodson | March 20, 2026 |
| 16 | 3 | "Help the Dress-Up Bear!" | Lauren Monroe | March 20, 2026 |
The Wonder Pets must get a koala to bed before he sleepwalks into trouble, and the gang comes together to help a bear find the perfect outfit.
| 17 | 4 | "Help the Wallabies!" | Bar Ben-Yossef | March 20, 2026 |
| 17 | 4 | "Help the Slimy Slug!" | Saurin Choksi | March 20, 2026 |
A baby kangaroo would rather stay in his mama's pouch than venture outside, and a slimy slug seeks a game he can play with his friends.
| 18 | 5 | "Here Comes Cousin Luca!" | Melinda LaRose | March 20, 2026 |
| 18 | 5 | "Help the Emperor Penguin...Fly!" | Ed Lee | March 20, 2026 |
The trio becomes a quartet for a day when Zuri's cousin pays a visit, and an emperor penguin tries to conquer flying.
| 19 | 6 | "Help the Blue Whale!" | Stacey Greenberger | March 20, 2026 |
| 19 | 6 | "Help the Baby Meerkat!" | Andrew Blanchette | March 20, 2026 |
A blue whale deals with some bubble trouble, and the pets search the savanna to reunite a meerkat with his mom.
| 20 | 7 | "Save the Fennec Fox!" | Saurin Choksi | March 20, 2026 |
| 20 | 7 | "Save the Giant Tortoise!" | Fareid El Gafy | March 20, 2026 |
A fennec fox is flustered by a noisy road, and the trio aids a tortoise whose world got flipped upside down--literally!
| 21 | 8 | "Save the Coral!" | Fareid El Gafy | March 20, 2026 |
| 21 | 8 | "Help the Queen Bee!" | Laura Kleinbaum | March 20, 2026 |
It is all paws to the rescue when a coral reef is covered in garbage, and a newly crowned queen bee gives the team a buzz for some honey help.
| 22 | 9 | "A Day at the Beach!" | Kevin Del Aguila | March 20, 2026 |
| 22 | 9 | "Save the Savanna Friends!" | Steve Altiere | March 20, 2026 |
The pets need help when a beach day goes awry, and a baby hippo faces a tough goodbye when her friend moves away.
| 23 | 10 | "Help the Red Panda!" | Gloria Shen | March 20, 2026 |
| 23 | 10 | "Help the Songbirds...Write a Song!" | Billy Lopez | March 20, 2026 |
Friends come together when a red panda's paper lantern rips, and songbirds look to the trio for musical inspiration.
| 24 | 11 | "Help the Dancing Fishies!" | Katherine Chilson | March 20, 2026 |
| 24 | 11 | "Save the Red Balloon!" | Kevin Del Aguila | March 20, 2026 |
The Wonder Pets being harmony to an underwater dance battle, and a runaway balloon races through the city.
| 25 | 12 | "Save the Scarecrow!" | Steve Altiere | March 20, 2026 |
When a scarecrow isn't scary enough to fend off pumpkin-eating crows, the Wonder Pets have to save Halloween.
| 26 | 13 | "Help the Holiday Hamster!" | Lauren Monroe | March 20, 2026 |
| 26 | 13 | "Save the Snowman!" | Everest Varanasi | March 20, 2026 |
A hamster is too excited to sleep on Christmas Eve, and the trio smells trouble when a snowman's carrot nose goes missing.

== Production ==
In October 2024, it was announced that a new series based on the original Wonder Pets! would be released on Apple TV+ in December. The official trailer was released in late November.

The show uses the same technique of "photo puppetry" as the original. A second season was released on March 20, 2026.

== Release ==
In August 2025, all three seasons of the original were added to Apple TV+, with Wonder Pets: In the City, being listed as the fourth season.

== Reception ==
Ashley Moulton of Common Sense Media gave the reboot, Wonder Pets: In The City, four stars out of five, calling it a "sweet reboot with musical, empathetic, and helpful pets."

=== Awards and nominations ===
| Year | Award | Category | Recipient | Result | Ref. |
|---|---|---|---|---|---|
| 2025 | Annie Awards | Best Animated Television Production for Preschool | Wonder Pets: In the City - "Save Tate?" | Nominated | |
| 2025 | Television Critics Association Awards | Outstanding Achievement in Children's Programming | Wonder Pets: In the City | Nominated | |
| 2026 | Children's and Family Emmy Awards | Outstanding Younger Voice Performer in a Preschool, Children's or Young Teen Program | Vanessa Huszar | Nominated | |
| 2026 | Children's and Family Emmy Awards | Outstanding Younger Voice Performer in a Preschool, Children's or Young Teen Program | Christopher Sean Cooper Jr. | Won | |
| 2026 | Children's and Family Emmy Awards | Outstanding Writing for a Preschool Animated Series | Steve Altiere, Billy Lopez and Katie Chilson (for "Save the Runaway Egg") | Nominated | |
| 2026 | Children's and Family Emmy Awards | Outstanding Directing for a Preschool Animated Series | Jennifer Oxley, Rob Powers, Tom Gray and Pete McEvoy (for "Save Tate?") | Nominated | |
| 2026 | Children's and Family Emmy Awards | Outstanding Voice Directing for an Animated Series | Holly Gregory, Jeffrey Lesser and Benjie Randall (for "Save the Roly Poly") | Nominated | |
| 2026 | 41st Artios Awards | Animated Program For Television | Danielle Pretsfelder Demchick and Associate Casting Director: Elizabeth Hay | Nominated | |
