= Toby (disambiguation) =

Toby is a masculine given name. It may also refer to:

== Places ==
- Toby, Elk County, Pennsylvania, United States, an unincorporated community
- Mount Toby, Massachusetts, United States
- Toby Glacier, British Columbia, Canada
- Toby Township, Pennsylvania, United States, a town

== Arts, entertainment, and media ==
- Toby (album), a 1974 release by the Chi-Lites
- "Toby", a dialogue interlude from the Belle & Sebastian album Storytelling
- Save Toby, humor website and book based around threatening to eat a rabbit named Toby
- Toby Jug, a pottery jug in the image of a human being, called a "Toby" in Cockney slang
- Toby: The Secret Mine, a 2015 video game
- Toby (film), a 2023 Kannada-language film
- Toby the Tram Engine, a Thomas & Friends character

== Other uses ==
- Toby (surname)
- Toby, a fish from the genus Canthigaster
- Toby, a 2018 winter storm in North America

== See also ==
- Tobi (disambiguation)
