= Tobi =

Tobi may refer to:

== Palau ==
- Tobi (island), island in the Palauan state of Hatohobei
- Tobian language, the language of Tobi
- Hatohobei, an island and the southernmost of Palau's sixteen states

== Media and entertainment ==
- Tobi!, a 2009 television series
- Tobi (film), a 1978 Spanish comedy
- TOBi, Nigerian-Canadian rapper and singer
- Tobi (Naruto), the alias of Obito Uchiha, one of the primary antagonists in the anime and manga series Naruto Shippuden

== Other uses ==
- Tobi (given name), a unisex name
- Tobi (month), in the Coptic calendar
- A brand name for the medication tobramycin, an antibiotic
- ToBI, a standard for transcribing English intonation
- Tobi shokunin or tobi for short; construction workers in Japan
  - Tobi trousers, the typical piece of clothing of tobi shokunin
- Texas Oilman's Bass Invitational (TOBI)

== See also ==
- Tobias
- Toby (disambiguation)
- Tubi, free ad-supported video-on-demand streaming service
