= Tobi (given name) =

- Gender: Unisex

Tobi is a Yoruba unisex given name. It can be a contraction of several longer terms, including Olutobi, Oluwatobi, Oluwatobiloba. It can also be a name from another culture like Tobit, and from the English culture and a variant of "Toby", which has a different meaning from the Yoruba name version also spelled Tobi. Notable people with this given name include:

- Tobi (musician), Nigerian-Canadian rapper
- Tobi Adebayo-Rowling (born 1996), English professional footballer
- Tobi Adewole (born 1995), English professional footballer
- Tobi Adeyemi, known as Tobi Lou, American rapper
- Tobi Brown, known as TBJZL (born 1993), English YouTuber
- Tobi Jnohope (born 1997), American soccer player
- Tobi Lawal (born 2003), English basketball player
- Tobi Osunsanmi (born 2004), American football player
- Tobi Sokolow (born 1942), American bridge player
- Tobi Stoner (born 1984), Major League Baseball pitcher
- Tobi Vail (born 1969), independent musician

== See also ==
- Toby (disambiguation)
- Tobias (disambiguation)
