= Save Bernd =

Internet campaign

Bernd
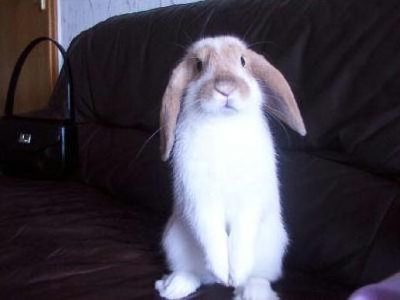
- Bernd the rabbit
- Website type: Humor
- Available in: German
- Website: Krohm.net/Paul.htm
- Commercial: No
- Launched: 2004

Bernd is a humor website. The premise of the site is that the website's webmaster Chris Krohm, will eat Bernd, a pet rabbit, unless he receives €1,000,000 in donations to care for it.

== Save Bernd! ==
The website was created in July 2004 in German language as "Rettet Bernd!" and the first link to it was posted on the supporters' messageboard of a German soccer club. An English version of this website was then released in early August 2004. The website claimed that the owner found Bernd underneath a banana box next to a bottle bank. The webmaster also stated that, unless he received €1,000,000 in Euros to pay for its care, he would eat the rabbit. The money could be either donated directly, or through purchasing "Save Bernd" merchandise.

The webmaster never attempted to remain anonymous. The main URL on the webmaster's website stated a mobile phone number as well as details of the webmaster's bank account with Lloyds TSB, UK. Krohm also stated that 80% of the donations will be given to charity.

The website had its own merchandise webshop and a sponsoring link to earn €3,500 monthly through a sperm bank.

The original deadline for receiving the money was December 31, 2004. When the deadline passed, it was extended to March 27, 2005, claiming that it was due to the extensive pressure from the public. Krohm claims that the final balance on donations and merchandise was €71,466. A donation list was published by Krohm, too.

== Public response & legitimacy ==
The website received media attention especially throughout Europe as well as in Australia i.e. Bernd also featured on Mondo Thingo. The Austrian Press Agency was first by publishing reports about "Rettet Bernd!" on July 28, 2004 and several radio stations and newspapers reported about it. The German TV channel RTL Television broadcast an interview with Krohm in August 2008.

The webmaster decided to release an English version of the webpage as he received several requests from English speaking internet users. The Irish radio station FM 104 aired a telephone interview with Krohm on August 30, 2008 in its The Strawberry Alarm Clock and the number of the website's hits rose quickly to around 2 million page loads by November 2004. The website caused an upset with many animal rights activists but the webmaster stated that Bernd would be given to a professional butcher in order to avoid any problems with animal welfare organizations. RSPCA however did contact Lloyds TSB in order to determine if it could refuse payments but Lloyds declined to comment due to the customer's confidentiality.

The public prosecutor's office of Vienna confirmed that Krohm's planned action was within the law. There were attempts by a group to do a protest march just before the end of the original deadline in December 2004 as well as threats of a German, militant group.

There has also been questions about whether or not the site was legitimate. Krohm, when asked in radio interviews, claimed that the site was completely serious and he would eat the rabbit and that he actually did receive a number of recipes. The site today claims that "Bernd is gone", but not that he was eaten. Small letters at the bottom of the page make it clear that "It's a joke", although there is no such message in the German version.

== See also ==
- Save Toby
