= Wonder Pets! =

American preschool animated children's television series

- Genre: Animated series; Adventure; Children's television; Musical; Preschool
- Created by: Josh Selig
- Written by: Billy Aronson; Billy Lopez; Chris Nee; Sascha Paladino; Adam Peltzman; Josh Selig; Melinda Richards; Jennifer Oxley
- Directed by: Jennifer Oxley
- Voices of: Sofie Zamchick; Teala Dunn; Danica Lee
- Theme music composer: Larry Hochman
- Opening theme: "The Wonder Pets!"
- Ending theme: "The Wonder Pets!" (instrumental)
- Composers: Larry Hochman; Jeffrey Lesser; Billy Lopez; Bobby Lopez
- Country of origin: United States
- Original language: English
- No. of seasons: 3
- No. of episodes: Shorts: 2; Full-length episodes: 62; (list of episodes)

Production
- Executive producer: Josh Selig
- Producer: Tone Thyne
- Editors: Romeo Alaeff; Susie Herang
- Running time: 22 minutes
- Production companies: Little Airplane Productions; Nick Jr. Productions (seasons 1–2); Nickelodeon Animation Studios

Original release
- Network: Nickelodeon (2006–10); Noggin (2009) (Note: "Save the Rat Pack!" / "Save the Fiddler Crab!"); Nick Jr. Channel (2010–16)
- Release: March 3, 2006 – October 17, 2016

Related
- Wonder Pets: In the City

Wonder Pets! is an American animated musical children's television series created by Josh Selig and produced by Little Airplane Productions for Nickelodeon. The series follows a trio of anthropomorphic classroom pets, Linny the Guinea Pig, Turtle Tuck, and Ming-Ming Duckling, who use teamwork to help animals in need. Most of the characters' dialogue is sung in the style of a sung-through musical. Each episode is set to original music by a ten-member live orchestra.

Josh Selig and Jennifer Oxley developed the idea for Wonder Pets! while working on their previous show, Oobi. The series started out with two animated shorts called "Linny the Guinea Pig", which acted as pilot episodes. To animate them, Oxley created a style of animation called "photo-puppetry" that uses photos of real objects and moves them using Adobe After Effects. The shorts featured Linny going on adventures set to classical music. In 2003, Little Airplane screened the shorts at the wrap party for Oobi's second season. The shorts caught the attention of Nickelodeon, who picked up the shorts to air in between shows on the Nick Jr. block.

The two original shorts were aired throughout 2003 and 2004. For the full-length series, the characters of Tuck and Ming-Ming were added to form a team of hero pets. Tuck was created using photos of Jennifer Oxley's own pet turtle (a red-eared slider). The first long-form episode debuted on March 3, 2006, as part of the Nick Jr. block on Nickelodeon. On that same day, the series started airing on Noggin as well. It ran for three seasons and 62 episodes. The final episode aired on October 17, 2016. The first two seasons and majority of season 3 aired on Nickelodeon, while the last nine episodes only aired on the separate Nick Jr. Channel.

A reboot series titled Wonder Pets: In the City, was released on Apple TV+ on December 13, 2024. The series, produced without the involvement of Selig or Little Airplane (due to the studio being shut down by parent company Studio 100 in 2023), centers on a new team of Wonder Pets and takes place in New York City. Much like the original series, the revival is produced by Nickelodeon Animation Studio.

== Premise ==
The series centers on three pets living in a red schoolhouse. Each episode (two separate eleven-minute segments or a single twenty-two-minute episode) follows a similar structure, with many hallmarks and repeated elements. As each episode begins, a bunch of schoolchildren and their teacher are heard from off-screen, leaving school as they say goodbye to their three classroom pets: a Guinea pig named Linny, a turtle named Tuck, and a duckling named Ming-Ming. The classroom is always decorated with student artwork and other items related to a given episode's particular storyline, featured animal, or geographic location. Once the classroom is empty, a pencil holder rattles to create the ringing of a phone.

One by one, the classroom pets notice the ringing phone. So they put on their accessories (consisting of an orange cap for Linny, shoes and a sailor hat for Tuck, and an aviator helmet for Ming-Ming) and make their way towards the phone while singing their opening verses. The Wonder Pets answer the phone and find that an animal is in trouble somewhere, followed by Linny explaining the situation to Tuck and Ming-Ming. They all jump into a dress-up box filled with fabric scraps and jump back out wearing different outfits, often referencing the area of the world they will be visiting. They make a quick joke and jump back into the box, before reemerging wearing their superhero capes.

Once dressed, they assemble their flying vehicle out of school supplies, called the Flyboat. In some episodes, the Wonder Pets opt for a different mode of transportation by adjusting the Flyboat. Usually, the trio faces assorted problems before leaving the classroom, and sometimes while on the way to where the animals are. The solution is invariably similar to the action they will do to save or help the animals in trouble.

When trying to save the animals, the Wonder Pets lose their first few attempts, and the danger escalates, prompting Ming-Ming to sing her iconic line, "This is sewious!" Suddenly, the Wonder Pets remember how they solved the problem back in the classroom and realize that the rescue has a similar solution and they work together to achieve the rescue. Once the animals are rescued, either its parents or other relatives appears to give grateful thanks to the Wonder Pets, who then celebrate with a celery snack. The rescued animal's parent sometimes adds a bit of regional condiments or insists on a regional preparation. The pets fly back to the school and return to their cages as their hats and capes come off, and the Flyboat automatically disassembles upon landing. Ming-Ming is the first one to get back in her cage, Tuck is the second, and Linny is the last. A musical riff relating to the episode's rescue is played as Linny takes a nibble out of her own celery in her cage and winks at the camera. Other pets have winked at the camera, including Tuck in “Save the Rhino!”, Ming-Ming in “Back to Kalamazoo!” and "In The Land of Oz!", and Ollie in "Ollie to the Rescue!" and "The Amazing Ollie!". Another episode or the end credits then begin.

== Episodes ==
The series debuted on March 3, 2006, on Nickelodeon's Nick Jr. block.

Season	Episodes	Originally aired	
Season	Episodes	First aired	Last aired
Shorts	2	2003	2003
1	20	March 3, 2006	May 23, 2008
2	20	October 19, 2007	July 26, 2010
3	22	April 22, 2009	October 17, 2016

== Characters ==
- Linny (voiced by Sofie Zamchick in the US and Meisha Kelly in the UK) is a brown guinea pig who is the leader of the Wonder Pets and the oldest of the trio. Linny is the most educated of the group, often providing information about the different animals and environments that the pets encounter. Linny is usually the one to remind the group about teamwork and offer praise. She has the responsibility of starting and driving the Flyboat. Linny's catchphrase is "This calls for some celery!", said at the end of each adventure. She always carries some celery with her and brings it out to celebrate after every successful mission.
- Tuck (voiced by Teala Dunn in the US and Catherine Holden in the UK) is a red-eared slider turtle and the middle of the trio, who is very sensitive with an emotional connection to living things, as well as the center of the group. Tuck is also empathetic, often wanting to give the rescued animals a hug or keeping them company while Linny and Ming-Ming put their rescue plan into action. He has keen observational skills and can spot things from long distances, which Linny compliments him, "Good eye, Tuck!" He has an older cousin named Buck, whose cool demeanor and many skills make Tuck jealous.
- Ming-Ming (voiced by Danica Lee in the US and Kaya Alexander in the UK) is a duckling and the youngest of the trio. Unlike the other Wonder Pets, she can fly and speak "bird", allowing her to connect with other birds that the Wonder Pets encounter. Ming-Ming often provides comic relief in the show and is most likely to use irony and mild sarcasm. Her family, which consists of Marvin, her baby cousin, and their aunt Elenora, comes from a petting zoo in Kalamazoo, Michigan, and she visits them on occasion. She speaks with a prominent rhotacism, pronouncing "r" sounds as "w". She is known for saying "This is sewious!", whenever there is trouble.

=== Recurring ===
- Ollie (voiced by T.J. Stanton in seasons 1 and 2 and Cooper Corrao in season 3) is a gray rabbit who considers himself the fourth Wonder Pet. He is self-centered and often unintentionally annoys the Wonder Pets whenever he visits their classroom. He has his own superhero team, the "Thunder Pets", consisting of himself and his toys. However, unlike the main Wonder Pets, he is not a good rescuer and invariably needs help from the Wonder Pets whenever he tries to save someone. He lives in a burrow outside of the Wonder Pets' schoolhouse with his mother, sister, and baby brother.
- Ginny (voiced by Anne Meara) is Linny's grandmother who lives in a nursing home with an old white mouse named Bernie (voiced by Jerry Stiller). Like Linny, she is self-confident, a natural leader, and loves celery.
- The Visitor is an extraterrestrial being who lives on a faraway planet. He resembles a purple frog-like creature with two antennae and one foot. He knows a few English phrases but can only speak in short fragments. He crash-lands on Earth in "Save the Visitor" and needs the Wonder Pets' help to fly back to space. He becomes a good friend of theirs and invites them to his party in "Save the Visitor's Birthday Party".
- Little Bee and Slug are a pair of bug friends. Little Bee (voiced by Brielle Barbusca) is a young yellow-and-black bumblebee who is learning how to make honey for her hive. Slug is a brownish-green garden slug who wears the top of an acorn as a hat. She and Slug appear as the main characters of "The Adventures of Bee & Slug" and "Bee & Slug Underground"
- Baby Dragon and Uni are two mythical creatures who live in a storybook in the Wonder Pets' classroom. Baby Dragon is a wingless dragon, and Uni is his best friend, a unicorn. They first appear in "Save the Unicorn!", in which the Wonder Pets try to help Uni when her horn is stuck in a tree. After freeing Uni, the Wonder Pets try to flee from Baby Dragon, but they discover that he is Uni's best friend. In "Save the Dragon", the Wonder Pets return to the storybook land to save Baby Dragon after he gets stuck on a cloud.

== Production and history ==
Wonder Pets! was produced by Little Airplane Productions. Before Wonder Pets! started, Little Airplane had only produced live-action works, like Oobi and a short film titled The Time-Out Chair. After Oobi became a breakout success for the studio, its co-founder Josh Selig expressed interest in producing another television show. Little Airplane produced two animated shorts called "Linny the Guinea Pig." The shorts focused on a silent guinea pig who left her classroom to go on fantastic adventures, each set to classical music. Jennifer Oxley, who had joined Little Airplane as an animator, signed on as the director of the two shorts.

Josh Selig and Jennifer Oxley first screened the shorts at the wrap party for Oobi's second season. The shorts eventually caught the attention of Nickelodeon, who picked up the shorts to air in-between shows and eventually commissioned a full season of 20 long-form episodes. Tuck and Ming-Ming were added to the cast to form a team of superhero pets, and the characters were given voices; the dialogue-free nature of the original shorts did not translate well to half-hour episodes. At first, the show was called The Super Singing Power Pets!, but it was renamed Wonder Pets! because the former name was too long. Many former crew members of Oobi moved onto the show, including writers Chris Nee and Sascha Paladino and composers Larry Hochman and Jeffrey Lesser.

The animation style used to create Wonder Pets! is called "photo-puppetry," and was created for the series to allow animators to manipulate photographs of real animals. It also uses drawn objects (not characters), so the total presentation could be considered animated mixed-media. Jennifer Oxley considers this technique her own invention and first used it to create lifelike transitions for Little Airplane's previous works.

A good deal of the dialog is sung, so the show has been likened to operetta or singspiel. A 10-member live orchestra performs each episode, sometimes including other instrumentalists skilled in music from the region to which the pets are traveling during the episode. Completing each episode took thirty-three weeks from script to final delivery.

== Broadcast and release ==
Wonder Pets! premiered on Nickelodeon and Noggin on March 3, 2006.

=== DVD compilations ===
Region 1
Name	Release date	Episodes
Save the Wonder Pets!	April 24, 2007	"Save the Wonder Pets!", "Save the Sea Lions!", "Save the Kangaroo!", "Save the Caterpillar!", "Save the Crane!", "Save the Hedgehog!" and "Save the Crocodile!"
Save the Unicorn!	September 11, 2007	"Save the Unicorn!", "Save the Penguin!", "Save the Three Little Pigs!", "Save the Owl!", "Save the Swan!", "Save the Puppy!", "Save the Bullfrog!" and "Save the Poodle!"
Save the Reindeer!	October 2, 2007	"Save the Reindeer!", "Save the Camel!", "Save the Ants!", "Save the Goldfish!", "Save the Baby Birds!", "Save the Egg!" and "Save the Flamingo!"
Save the Dinosaur!	February 12, 2008	"Save the Dinosaur!", "Save the Pigeon!", "Save the Dragon!", "Save the Beaver!", "Save the Bee!", "Save the Squirrel!", "Save the Dolphin!" and "Save the Chimp!"
Save the Beetles!	April 22, 2008	"Save the Beetles!", "Three Wonder Pets and a Baby!", "Save the Chameleon!", "Save the Platypus!", "Save the Duckling!", "Save the Kitten!", "Save the Sheep!" and "Save the Hermit Crab!"
Save the Nursery Rhyme!	June 3, 2008	"Help the Cow Jump Over the Moon!", "Save the Itsy Bitsy Spider!", "Save Little Red Riding Hood!", "Save the Turtle!", "Save the Griffin!", "Save the Rooster!", "Save the Panda!" and "Save the Mouse!"
Save the Bengal Tiger!	September 9, 2008	"Save the Bengal Tiger!", "Save the Gecko!", "Save the What?", "Save the Ladybug!", "Save the Sea Turtle!", "Save the Goslings!" and "Ollie to the Rescue!"
Save the Nutcracker!	October 7, 2008	"Save the Nutcracker!" "Save the Pangaroo!", "Save the Cricket!", "Save the Old White Mouse!", "The Adventures of Bee and Slug!","Save the Cow!", and "Save the Skunk!"
Join the Circus!	February 24, 2009	"Join the Circus!", "Save the Rat Pack!", "Save the Fiddler Crab on the Roof!", "Save the Armadillo!", "Save the Visitor!", "Save the Tree!" and "Save the Elephant!"
Ollie's Slumber Party!	June 9, 2009	"Here's Ollie!", "Save the Hound Dog", "The Amazing Ollie!", "Help the Monster!", "Save the Cool Cat and the Hip Hippo!", "Tuck and Buck!", "Save the Dancing Duck!", and "Save the Dalmatian!"
The First Rescue	April 5, 2010	"How It All Began!", "Happy Mother's Day!", "Save the Sun Bear!", "Save the Mermaid!", "Save the Visitor's Birthday Party!", "A Job Well Done!", and "Save the Rhino!"
Season 1	October 26, 2015	"Save the Dolphin!", "Save the Chimp!", "Save the Unicorn!", "Save the Penguin!", "Save the Sea Lions!", "Save the Kangaroo!", "Save the Caterpillar!", "Save the Crane!", "Save the Duckling!", "Save the Kitten!", "Save the Pigeon!", "Save the Dinosaur!", "Save the Cow!", "Save the Skunk!", "Save the Swan!", "Save the Puppy!", "Save the Tree!", "Save the Elephant!", "Save the Panda!", and "Save the Mouse!"

== Reception ==
Pam Gelman of Common Sense Media gave the show four stars out of five, describing as "kid-friendly mini-operas about teamwork and more."

Emily Writes of The Spinoff criticized the series' music in 2018, saying: "I'm a vegetarian but the songs on Wonder Pets make me want to eat duck just to shut that lisping bastard up. The desperately inane 'Team Work What's Gonna Work? Team Work' anthem is surely the worst song to ever exist in the realm of children's TV tunes."

=== Awards ===
Year	Award	Program	Category	Result	Ref.
2008	Daytime Emmy Awards	Wonder Pets!	Outstanding Music Direction and Composition	Won	
2010	Annie Awards	Wonder Pets!	Outstanding Directing in a Television Production (for "Help the Monster")	Nominated	
2010	Annie Awards	Wonder Pets!	Outstanding Writing in a Television Production (for "Save the Honey Bears")	Nominated	
2010	Daytime Emmy Awards	Wonder Pets!	Outstanding Performer in an Animated Program (Eartha Kitt as Cool Cat)	Won	
2010	Daytime Emmy Awards	Wonder Pets!	Outstanding Achievement in Music Direction and Composition	Won	
2010	Daytime Emmy Awards	Wonder Pets!	Outstanding Original Song – Children's and Animation ("A Fiddler Crab am I")	Won	
2011	Daytime Emmy Awards	Wonder Pets!	Outstanding Performer in an Animated Program (Steven Tyler as The Mad Hatter)	Nominated	
2011	Daytime Emmy Awards	Wonder Pets!	Outstanding Achievement in Music Direction and Composition	Nominated	
2012	Daytime Emmy Awards	Wonder Pets!	Outstanding Pre-School Children's Series	Nominated	
2012	Daytime Emmy Awards	Wonder Pets!	Outstanding Achievement in Music Direction and Composition	Won	
2012	Daytime Emmy Awards	Wonder Pets!	Outstanding Writing in a Children's Series	Nominated	
2014	Daytime Emmy Awards	Wonder Pets!	Outstanding Pre-School Children's Animated Program	Nominated	
2014	Daytime Emmy Awards	Wonder Pets!	Outstanding Achievement in Music Direction and Composition	Nominated	
2014	Daytime Emmy Awards	Wonder Pets!	Outstanding Writing in a Preschool Animated Program	Nominated	

== In other media ==
=== Books (Wonder Pets! series) ===
- Arranged in publication date order.
1. Josh Selig (January 8, 2008). Teamwork Saves the Day!: Book and Beanie Baby Gift Set. Simon Spotlight/Nickelodeon. ISBN 978-1-4169-4797-4.
2. Little Airplane Productions; Jennifer Oxley (July 29, 2008). Flyboat Adventures. Simon Spotlight/Nickelodeon. ISBN 978-1-4169-4742-4.
3. Josh Selig (July 29, 2008). Go, Wonder Pets!. Simon Spotlight/Nickelodeon. ISBN 978-1-4169-4723-3.
4. Josh Selig (July 29, 2008). The Wonder Pets Save the Dinosaur!. Simon Spotlight/Nickelodeon. ISBN 978-1-4169-4724-0.
5. Jennifer Oxley; Little Airplane Productions (July 29, 2008). Let's Count Baby Animals!. Simon Spotlight/Nickelodeon. ISBN 978-1-4169-6393-6.
6. Josh Selig (July 29, 2008). Good Night, Wonder Pets!. Simon Spotlight/Nickelodeon. ISBN 978-1-4169-6154-3.
7. Melinda Richards (July 29, 2008). The Wonder Pets Save the Hedgehog!. Simon Spotlight/Nickelodeon. ISBN 978-1-4169-4727-1.
8. Billy Lopez; Little Airplane Productions (August 26, 2008). Save the Bengal Tiger!. Simon Spotlight/Nickelodeon. ISBN 978-1-4169-6495-7.
9. We Can Help!. Simon Spotlight/Nickelodeon. August 26, 2008. ISBN 978-1-4169-6865-8.
10. Wonder pets!: save the reindeer!. Simon Spotlight/Nickelodeon. October 7, 2008. ISBN 978-1-4169-6174-1.
11. Heather R. Tilert (October 21, 2008). Ming-Ming Saves the Day: Follow the Reader Level 1. Simon Scribbles. ISBN 978-1-4169-6459-9.
12. Jennifer Oxley (October 28, 2008). Let's Find Colors!. Simon Spotlight/Nickelodeon. ISBN 978-1-4169-5824-6.
13. Josh Selig; Little Airplane Productions (December 16, 2008). The Wonder Pets Love You!. Simon Spotlight/Nickelodeon. ISBN 978-1-4169-6457-5.
14. Josh Selig; Melanie Pal; Little Airplane Productions (December 23, 2008). Join the Circus. Simon Spotlight/Nickelodeon. ISBN 978-1-4169-7581-6.
15. Kermit Frazier; Little Airplane Productions (January 6, 2009). Save the Tree!: Little Green Nickelodeon. Simon Spotlight/Nickelodeon. ISBN 978-1-4169-5111-7.
16. You Can Fly, Bumblebee!. Simon Spotlight/Nickelodeon. January 27, 2009. ISBN 978-1-4169-7107-8.
17. Billy Lopez; Little Airplane Productions (January 27, 2009). Save the Egg!. Simon Spotlight/Nickelodeon. ISBN 978-1-4169-7103-0.
18. Tone Thyne (February 10, 2009). ABC Party. Simon Spotlight/Nickelodeon. ISBN 978-1-4169-7104-7.
19. Josh Selig (March 24, 2009). My Family Loves Me!. Simon Spotlight/Nickelodeon. ISBN 978-1-4169-7515-1.
20. Clark Stubbs (June 23, 2009). Let's Discover Shapes!. Simon Spotlight/Nickelodeon. ISBN 978-1-4169-7196-2.
21. Save the Three Little Pigs!. Simon Spotlight/Nickelodeon. June 23, 2009. ISBN 978-1-4169-7198-6.
22. Sascha Paladino; Little Airplane Productions (June 23, 2009). Off to School!. Simon Spotlight. ISBN 978-1-4169-7197-9.
23. Save the Visitor!. Simon Spotlight/Nickelodeon. June 23, 2009. ISBN 978-1-4169-7868-8.
24. Baby Beaver Rescue. Simon Spotlight/Nickelodeon. July 14, 2009. ISBN 978-1-4169-8499-3.
25. Save Little Red Riding Hood!. Simon Spotlight/Nickelodeon. July 14, 2009. ISBN 978-1-4169-8566-2.
26. Happy Halloween, Wonder Pets!. Simon Spotlight/Nickelodeon. August 4, 2009. ISBN 978-1-4169-7982-1.
27. Save the Beetles!. Simon Spotlight/Nickelodeon. September 22, 2009. ISBN 978-1-4169-9019-2.
28. The Wonder Pets Save the Nutcracker!: A Play-Along Storybook. Simon Spotlight/Nickelodeon. October 6, 2009. ISBN 978-1-4169-9016-1.
29. Billy Lopez (January 26, 2010). Ming-Ming's Favorite Things. Simon Spotlight/Nickelodeon. ISBN 978-1-4169-9062-8.
30. Laura Brown (February 9, 2010). Let's Play Outside!. Simon Spotlight/Nickelodeon. ISBN 978-1-4169-9022-2.
31. Tone Thyne; Little Airplane Productions (February 9, 2010). Let's Play the Opposites Game. Simon Spotlight/Nickelodeon. ISBN 978-1-4169-8507-5.
32. The Baby Bird Rescue!. Simon Spotlight/Nickelodeon. February 9, 2010. ISBN 978-1-4169-9077-2.
33. Floppy's First Sleepover. Simon Spotlight/Nickelodeon. June 8, 2010. ISBN 978-1-4169-9756-6.
34. Melinda Richards (June 8, 2010). Flyboat to the Rescue!. Simon Spotlight/Nickelodeon. ISBN 978-1-4169-9752-8.
35. This Is Serious!: Recycling to the Rescue! / Little Green Nickelodeon. Simon Spotlight/Nickelodeon. June 8, 2010. ISBN 978-1-4424-0231-7.
36. Michael Scanlon (August 31, 2010). How We Met!. Simon Spotlight/Nickelodeon. ISBN 978-1-4424-0654-4.
37. Josh Selig (September 7, 2010). We Are Thankful!. Simon Spotlight/Nickelodeon. ISBN 978-1-4424-0677-3.

=== Soundtrack ===
Wonder Pets!

Soundtrack album by Wonder Pets
- Released: April 10, 2007
- Genre: Children's
- Label: Nick Records

In addition to the DVDs and books, the show's self-titled track, Wonder Pets!, was released on April 10, 2007. The soundtrack features songs from the show itself, including the main self-titled theme song.

==== Track listing ====
All songs are performed by the Wonder Pets unless otherwise noted.

1. "The Wonder Pets!"
2. "Poor Baby Squirrel"
3. "The Caterpillar's Song"
4. "Oh, Sheep-eee-hooo!"
5. "Tickle the Whale"
6. "To Be Free!"
7. "Hold On, Pigeon!"
8. "Fruit Salad"
9. "City Garden Rap"
10. "Hug a Hedgy"
11. "The Oasis"
12. "Hola, Hermit Crab!"
13. "Wee-Wee, Pee-Pee, Tinkle!"
14. "Brown Cow Down"
15. "Wonder Pets, We Love You!"
16. "The Wonder Pets! Theme" (Instrumental)

=== Game ===
The Wonder Pets! Save the Animals!
- Publishers: 2K Play
- Publication: October 27, 2008 (US)
- Genres: Adventure
- Systems: Nintendo DS
- Players: 1
- Website: Official website

The Wonder Pets! Save the Animals! is a video game released on October 27, 2008 in North America exclusively for the Nintendo DS.

== Toys and merchandising ==
In March 2008, Fisher-Price began distributing a line of official Wonder Pets! toys in the United States. Toys include the Flyboat, figurine playsets, and plush animals. These figurine playsets have each Wonder Pet saving a different baby animal. These include Linny saving a baby penguin, Tuck saving a baby bluebird, and Ming-Ming rescuing a kitten. In addition, there is a whale playset for the tub.

== Reboot and cancelled spinoff ==
A reboot series, Wonder Pets: In the City, was released on Apple TV+ in 2024. Similar to the original, it follows three pets, this time in an urban environment. As of August 2025, the series is also categorized as the fourth season with the addition of the original to Apple TV+.

=== Cancelled spinoff ===
According to Dade Hayes book Anytime Playdate, after the success of Go, Diego, Go!, the episode "Kalamazoo," which focused on Ming-Ming visiting her baby cousin Marvin, was used as the basis for a potential Wonder Pets! spin-off series, but it never came to fruition.
