= The Adventures of Napkin Man! =

Canadian-American children's television series

- Genre: Children's television series
- Created by: Tone Thyne; Josh Selig
- Starring: Yannick Bisson; Ethan Tavares
- Composer: Ian LeFeuvre
- Countries of origin: Canada; United States
- No. of seasons: 3
- No. of episodes: 60

Production
- Executive producers: Tone Thyne; Josh Selig; Ira Levy
- Running time: 12 minutes
- Production companies: Little Tugboat; Little Airplane Productions; Breakthrough Entertainment

Original release
- Network: Kids' CBC/CBC Kids
- Release: December 30, 2013 – November 11, 2017

The Adventures of Napkin Man! is a children's television series created by Tone Thyne and Josh Selig. It premiered in 2013 on CBC Television, as part of the Kids' CBC block. Mixing live action with animation, the series stars Yannick Bisson as Mr. Anthony, a preschool teacher who writes and illustrates stories featuring Napkin Man, a superhero figure, to teach his students how to handle difficult emotions.

The series was produced by Little Airplane Productions and Breakthrough Entertainment.

The series won the Canadian Screen Award for Best Pre-School Program or Series at the 3rd Canadian Screen Awards in 2015, and Bisson won the award for best preschool or children’s show host.
