= Tobi! =

- Genre: Children's television series
- Created by: Josh Selig; Jennifer Oxley; Jim Chong
- Written by: Billy Lopez
- Directed by: Jennifer Oxley
- Narrated by: Brother Joscephus
- Composer: J. Walter Hawkes
- Countries of origin: United States; Canada; Australia
- Original language: English
- No. of episodes: 4

Production
- Running time: 4 minutes
- Production company: Little Airplane Productions

Original release
- Network: Treehouse TV (Canada); Nickelodeon (Australia)
- Release: March 7, 2010

Tobi! is a short-form children's television series originally airing on Treehouse TV in Canada, and Nickelodeon in Australia. The series premiered on March 7, 2010.

== Plot ==
A young boy named Tobi wishes to make his world a better place.

== Episodes ==
Only four episodes were produced. A list of them is available below.

=== List ===
- The Beach
- The Wall
- No Place Like Home
- Tobi and the Bonkle

== Broadcast ==
The series premiered on March 7, 2010, on Treehouse TV in Canada and Nickelodeon in Australia. The series would later be broadcast on various international networks.

=== Networks ===
- Australia: Nickelodeon
- Canada: Treehouse TV
- Denmark: Danish Broadcasting Corporation
- Finland: Finnish Broadcasting Company
- Iceland: RÚV
- Iran: IRIB
- Malaysia: TV Alhijrah
- Norway: NRK
- Sweden: Sveriges Television
