= 3rd & Bird =

Children's television series

- Created by: Josh Selig
- Directed by: Jennifer Oxley
- Starring: Sam Lewis; Eden Jarrett; Morgan Gayle; Michael Fenton Stevens; Anna Nygh; Charlie Cameron; Preston Nyman; David Beckford; Candida Gubbins; Ethann Lewis; Reiss Lewin
- Countries of origin: United Kingdom; United States
- Original language: English
- No. of series: 2
- No. of episodes: 52

Production
- Executive producers: Josh Selig; Kay Benbow; Chris Rose; Jackie Edwards
- Producers: Josh Selig, Fred Weinberg
- Running time: 10 minutes approx.
- Production companies: CBeebies Productions; Little Airplane Productions

Original release
- Network: CBeebies
- Release: 1 July 2008 – 31 July 2010

Related
- Oobi, Wonder Pets!

3rd & Bird is a children's animated television series created by Josh Selig and directed by Jennifer Oxley. The series was animated by Little Airplane Productions, which opened a second studio in London to produce it. The show revolves around a community of birds and their adventures. It was broadcast on the BBC's CBeebies channel from 1 July 2008 to 31 July 2010. Described in its initial press release as "a charming new animated series all about community", the show's format generally involves one or more of the characters encountering a problem which must be solved using the social skills which pre-school children must develop in order to make their way in the world.

The show uses "photo-puppetry", an animation style created by Jennifer Oxley that uses photos of real animals and moves them using Adobe After Effects. This same animation style was used for Little Airplane's previous show Wonder Pets! and the scene transitions on Oobi.

== Characters ==
=== Main ===
- Samuel (voiced by Sam Lewis) is the eldest of the Lovebird children, Samuel is a green lovebird. He acts as a role model to his younger sister, Muffin, and often tries to teach her how to be responsible.
- Muffin (voiced by Eden Jarrett) is a pink lovebird and Samuel's younger sister. Not yet old enough to fly, she usually rides on Samuel's back. Muffin calls Samuel "Samo," Rudy "Udy," Mr. Beakman "Beaky,” and Mrs. Billingsley “Bigsley.”
- Rudy (voiced by Morgan Gayle) is a cockatoo (despite resembling a cockatiel more closely) and Samuel's best friend. She wears a bracelet of colored beads on her ankle.
- Mr. Beakman (voiced by Michael Fenton Stevens) is the children's teacher, a wise but somewhat pompous toucan who frequently acts as the voice of parental authority. He shows an interest in mariachi bands.

=== Supporting ===
- Mrs. Billingsley (voiced by Anna Nygh) is a New Zealand gardening kiwi and the oldest bird in the treetop community. She wears a sunhat and is incapable of flying, which occasionally causes problems.
- Missy (voiced by Charlie Cameron) is a fashionable great blue turaco who speaks with a thick French accent. She refers to Samuel and his friends as "little birds."
- Quinn (voiced by Preston Nyman) is a teenage puffin inventor and technical whizz whose creations often feature in the younger birds' activities. The younger birds look up to him.
- Mr. and Mrs. Lovebird (voiced by David Beckford and Candida Gubbins, respectively) are Samuel and Muffin's parents, with Northern English accents. Despite being rarely seen, they care deeply for their children. Mr. Lovebird is the tree's caretaker.
- Baby Jordan (voiced by Reiss Lewin) is Mr. Beakman's nephew, who often uses big words like his uncle. He calls Muffin "Uffin."
- Elliot (voiced by George Phillips) is a worm who is friends with Samuel, Muffin, and Rudy.
- The ant is one of the few minor characters in 3rd & Bird, an unnamed insect.
- Ben is a minor character in 3rd & Bird, a sophisticated pig. He travels from tree to tree, helping birds in need.
- The birds are minor characters in 3rd & Bird. They are unnamed tropical birds that appear along with the major and recurring bird characters.
- The butterfly is a minor character in 3rd & Bird, an unnamed insect.
- The cow is a minor character in 3rd & Bird, an unnamed farm animal seen at the end of Muffin's Friend! as a joke. Muffin introduces the character as one of her friends.
- The crab is a minor character in 3rd & Bird, an unnamed crustacean.
- The cricket is a minor character in 3rd & Bird, an unnamed insect.
- The fireflies are minor characters in 3rd & Bird. They provide Muffin and Baby Jordan a way home after getting lost.
- The fly is one of the few minor characters in 3rd & Bird, an unnamed insect.
- The frogs are minor characters in 3rd & Bird, unnamed amphibians.
- The Grand Budgie is a minor character in 3rd & Bird, the leader of the Budgie troop. He is a blue-footed booby bird.
- The hawk is a minor character in 3rd & Bird, as well as one of the only antagonists in the series.
- The hummingbirds are minor characters in 3rd & Bird, two unnamed birds.
- The Jamaican party guests are minor characters in 3rd & Bird. They only appear in the series finale.
- The kitten is a minor character in 3rd & Bird, a young cat.
- The ladybird is a minor character in 3rd & Bird, an unnamed insect.
- The mice are minor characters in 3rd & Bird. They are a family of rodents.
- The owl is a minor character in 3rd & Bird, an unnamed bird.
- The Peacock Prince is a minor character in 3rd & Bird, a royal peacock. He wants to be treated like a normal bird, despite his status.
- The rabbit is a minor character in 3rd & Bird, seen at the beginning of the theme song in every episode. It also makes an appearance in Down to Earth!, an episode from season two.
- The Snail is a minor character that appears in the show 3rd & Bird.
- The spider is one of the few minor characters in 3rd & Bird, an unnamed arachnid.
- The Squirrel is a minor character in 3rd & Bird. It is spotted by Mr. Lovebird and Muffin, when it is stuck in a tree hole.
- The worms are minor characters in 3rd & Bird, various similar-looking earthworms.
- Ziggy the Parrot is a minor character in 3rd & Bird, a singing parrot from Jamaica. He is voiced by guest star Ziggy Marley.

The cast also includes world champion musical whistler, Michael Barimo, whose whistling accompanies the music of the show.

== Episodes ==
The series ran for a total of 52 episodes, including a two-part Christmas special ("A Very Squooky Christmas").

=== Season 1 (2008–2009) ===
No. overall	No. in season	Title	Original release date
1	1	"Fly, Muffin"	1 July 2008
Muffin wants to learn to fly, but it's very difficult. Mr. Beakman tells her to keep trying and Samuel invents a kite-apeze. Part kite, part trapeze and perfect for Muffin to fly on.
2	2	"Bird Theatre"	8 July 2008
Rudy and Samuel are rehearsing for Mr. Beakman's play, 'The Prize Potato'. Muffin wants to be in the play, too, but there's no part for her. That is, until the props get blown away.
3	3	"A Chorus for Us"	15 July 2008
Samuel, Muffin and Rudy each make up a silly song. Mrs. Billingsley invites them to perform one song after the adult bird chorus' concert. When the kids can't agree on whose song to sing, Samuel figures out a way to make all three songs into one big song.
4	4	"To Play or not to Play"	22 July 2008
Samuel and Rudy are playing, but they can't agree on what game to play. Mr. Beakman tells them not to give up - there must be something they both like. Muffin leads Rudy and Samuel to Missy's house where everyone agrees on dressing up.
5	5	"Muffin Express"	29 July 2008
Mr. Beakman is building a train set, the Sunset Express and Muffin tries to help but she makes things worse. Luckily, it's all sorted out before Mr. Beakman returns and Muffin gets to ride around in the train.
6	6	"The Rudy Show"	5 August 2008
Rudy, Samuel and Muffin invite the whole town to see the Rudy Show, but when they arrive at the theatre, they find a big branch has fallen on the stage. The kids have to be able to fix the stage in time for Rudy's performance.
7	7	"Super Slide"	12 August 2008
Samuel and Muffin ask Mrs. Lovebird to fly them to the super slide, but she's too busy. The children are disappointed, but then get the idea to build a super slide of their own. They'll need to ask the neighbours for help.
8	8	"Costume Party"	19 August 2008
Samuel wants to be an apple tree at the costume party, but Muffin eats his apple. Can the kids find him another costume in time?
9	9	"Meet Elliot"	26 August 2008
Samuel and Rudy invite Muffin to a picnic with their friend, Elliot. Muffin is shocked to find out that Elliot is a worm, and Samuel has trouble convincing Muffin that having different friends can be fun.
10	10	"Pogo Nest"	2 September 2008
Quinn builds Muffin a bouncy Pogo Nest and warns her that it will only fit one bird at a time, but as soon as Muffin leaves, Samuel and Rudy hop into the nest and break it. It is up to Samuel and Rudy fix the Pogo Nest before Muffin returns.
11	11	"Samuel's Dance"	4 November 2008
Everyone is practicing a dance for the big dance party but Samuel just can't find his rhythm. Rudy helps Samuel learn how to relax and soon he is doing his own awkward dance. When Samuel accidentally scratches a record at the dance party, he creates a whole new dance craze, the Samuel Scratch.
12	12	"Rolling Along"	11 November 2008
Mrs. Lovebird asks Samuel and Rudy to watch Muffin as she plays in her toy nest-car, but Muffin gets literally carried away and the nest-car rolls out of control on the branches.
13	13	"Perfect Picnic"	18 November 2008
Samuel, Muffin and Rudy are going on a picnic and Samuel insists that it be perfect. When Muffin only brings one tiny seed to eat, it looks like the picnic is ruined.
14	14	"Pie Fair"	25 November 2008
Quinn has created a pie-making machine for the pie fair and he enlists the help of Samuel, Rudy and Muffin to move the pies to the table. When Rudy pushes the machine's forbidden red button the machine goes berserk.
15	15	"Muffin's Shop"	2 December 2008
Muffin is playing shops but she has nothing to sell. She hops around the community innocently taking things that don't belong to her including Samuel's marbles, Mrs. Billingsley's watering can and Mr. Beakman's chalkboard duster.
16	16	"Dinosaur"	9 December 2008
Muffin really wants to see a dinosaur, and is heartbroken when Mr. Beakman tells her they are no longer around. Samuel and Rudy build Muffin a giant papier-mache dinosaur, but it scares her. Mr. Beakman helps Muffin to overcome her fear and she rides the dinosaur around the tree.
17	17	"Go Camping"	16 December 2008
Rudy, Quinn and Mr. Beakman are going camping with their Budgie troop and Muffin wants to come along. When Muffin gets homesick and wants to leave, it is up to Rudy and Samuel to show her the joys of camping.
18	18	"Starry Night"	23 December 2008
The whole community is gathering at the top of Branch Hill to watch a meteor shower, but the hill is too steep and Mrs. Billingsley can't reach the top.
19	19	"Amazing Muffin"	30 December 2008
Samuel and Muffin go to the Amazing Beakman's magic show, and Muffin is blown away.
20	20	"Ice Skating"	14 February 2009
Samuel, Muffin and Rudy head over to frozen branch lake with Mr. Beakman for some ice-skating. The kids notice Mr. Beakman won't get on the ice. Mr. Beakman tells them he has always been afraid to ice skate.
21	21	"Playhouse"	21 February 2009
Muffin stumbles on Samuel and Rudy's playhouse, but they won't let her come in. She stomps away and Quinn helps her build her own playhouse, even better than theirs. When Samuel and Rudy ask to visit, Muffin won't let them. Mr. Beakman suggests they stop quarrelling and put the playhouses together. They take his advice and make the best playhouse ever.
22	22	"Cowgirl"	28 February 2009
After seeing a cowboy movie, Muffin decides she'd like to be a cowgirl, but first she needs a hat. The kids get a hat from Mr. Beakman but now Muffin needs some boots. They get boots from Missy but now Muffin needs a horse.
23	23	"Muffin's Plant"	4 March 2009
Muffin comes upon a strange plant that she names Pee Ew. Pee Ew smells so terrible that no one wants the little plant in the tree.
24	24	"Baby Jordan"	11 March 2009
Mr. Beakman's three-year-old nephew Jordan comes to visit and the town gushes over him. Muffin, however, is jealous of the attention. Despite everyone's attempts to bring them together, Muffin refuses to be friends with Jordan.
25–26	25–26	"A Very Squooky Christmas"	18 December 2009
It's Christmas Eve, and Samuel hears a strange squook coming from the tree. Samuel, Rudy, and Muffin discover a little mouse that is frightened and lost.

=== Season 2 (2009–2010) ===
No. overall	No. in season	Title	Original release date
27	1	"Muffinland"	25 March 2009
Muffin builds her own amusement park called Muffinland. Samuel, Rudy and Mr. Beakman are the first to try out the rides but they all break. So Muffin asks for help and together the birds fix up Muffinland and make it into a spectacular attraction for the whole community.
28	2	"Meow Kitty"	3 April 2009
A kitten gets stuck in the tree and Samuel and Mr. Beakman are scared to go near her. Muffin watches the kitten and comes to realise that she's just as scared of them as they are of her.
29	3	"Mariachi Muffin!"	10 April 2009
The community is throwing a fiesta and a mariachi band is supposed to show up and play. Unfortunately, the band can't make it and Mr. Beakman announces they'll have to cancel the party. Everyone is glum until Muffin picks up a pair of maracas and shakes them.
30	4	"Beach Branch!"	17 April 2009
Mrs. Billingsley takes the kids out to Beach Branch, a sandy lake paradise hidden in the tree. When Muffin gets stuck on a flower out in the middle of the lake, the other birds have to build a boat and rescue Muffin before the flower sinks.
31	5	"Elliot the Budgie"	24 April 2009
Elliot the worm decides that he'd like to join the budgies, but when Samuel and Rudy bring him to a meeting, Mr. Beakman points out that the budgie code says that a budgie is a bird who never gives up.
32	6	"Art Show"	1 May 2009
Mr. Beakman is mounting an art show and Rudy, Samuel and Muffin ask if they can enter a painting. Mr. Beakman agrees, but there is only room for one more painting.
33	7	"Down to Earth!"	7 May 2009
When Muffin accidentally drops her favourite toy, Chloe, all the way down to the ground, Mr. Beakman agrees to lead an expedition to rescue the toy. The birds prepare an Earth buggy and explore the ground in search of Chloe.
34	8	"Road Trip!"	14 May 2009
Rudy borrows Quinn's bike for the day and puts a sidecar on it. She and Samuel go on a road trip and see the sights in the tree. On the way home, the birds realise that they're lost.
35	9	"Paint Job!"	21 May 2009
Samuel and Rudy are painting a fence when Rudy would rather be doing anything else. Rudy convinces Muffin that painting a fence is a lot of fun and they leave her to finish the job.
36	10	"Storm!"	28 May 2009
A blustering storm blows through 3rd and Bird and Missy's pear house is blown out of the tree with Missy still inside. She and her house land at the top of a tall statue and it's up to the community to find a way to get her safely back to her branch.
37	11	"Scooter!"	4 June 2009
Muffin asks Samuel if she can ride on his new scooter. Samuel explains that Muffin's too small but when Samuel is called away, Muffin rides the scooter anyway and crashes it. Samuel is furious. Mr. and Mrs. Lovebird must teach the kids the importance of forgiving and forgetting.
38	12	"Race!"	11 June 2009
Samuel and Rudy are going to race each other in a seedbox derby, but as the race nears, the two best friends become increasingly competitive. In an unlikely turn of events, Muffin wins the race.
39	13	"Robot!"	18 June 2009
When the wind-up robot that Quinn made malfunctions and runs amok through 3rd and Bird, it is up to Samuel, Rudy and Muffin to stop it.
40	14	"The Moon!"	25 June 2009
Rudy leads Muffin and Samuel on an expedition to the moon. They get astronaut outfits and Quinn gives them a rocket ship, but as they're about to take off, Mr. Beakman explains to the kids that they can't possibly fly to the moon. The kids get Mr. Beakman to come with them to a papier mache moon Rudy has made in the tree.
41	15	"Balloon Ride!"	2 July 2009
Muffin and Baby Jordan are playing together when they are drawn to one of Quinn's contraptions, a basket tied to several balloons. Jordan and Muffin hop in and accidentally take off into the sky. The kids are having a great time until the balloons begin to pop. The community has to save the kids before they crash.
42	16	"Help Daddy!"	9 July 2009
Muffin spends a day with her daddy, who is the tree superintendent. While Mr. Lovebird shows Muffin how he takes care of the tree, he will not allow her to actually help him. However, when Mr. Lovebird gets his wing stuck in a hole in a tree, Muffin is the only one small enough to save him.
43	17	"Ahoy!"	16 July 2009
Mr. Beakman, dressed as a pirate, leads the kids on a pirate adventure looking for buried treasure. They learn that being pirates is not as easy as they thought, but if they are keen on trying, they will find what they're looking for.
44	18	"Train!"	23 July 2009
Elliot gets stuck aboard a runaway Muffin Express! Though Samuel and Rudy attempt to rescue him, it's Muffin who finally saves Elliot and stops the runaway train.
45	19	"Baby!"	30 July 2009
Muffin wants to play Mummy, and Mr. Beakman agrees to play with her. However, when Muffin dresses him in a bonnet, sits him in a buggy and puts a bottle in his mouth, Mr. Beakman realises he has agreed to play the Baby! After he overcomes his initial embarrassment, Muffin and the community push Baby Beaky through the branches of the tree.
46	20	"Muffin's Friend!"	10 October 2009
Muffin introduces the community to her new friend, Ben the Pig! Samuel and Rudy warn Muffin that pigs are messy and lazy, but when Ben turns out to be clean, kind and helpful, the birds quickly change their tune. The community builds a beautiful barn for Ben to live in, but he informs them that he is only visiting the tree. Ben sings a heartfelt farewell to the community before parachuting down to the ground.
47	21	"Aunt Esther!"	17 October 2009
Samuel and Muffin are invited to Elliot's worm picnic, but when the picnic begins, Elliot's Aunt Esther is very rude to Samuel and Muffin - she doesn't like the idea of birds and worms spending time together. Will Esther be able to learn that different is good?
48	22	"Prince!"	24 October 2009
When a Peacock Prince visits the tree, the community is so concerned about doing or saying the wrong thing that they leave the Prince alone. Muffin is the only one who realises that the Peacock Prince just needs a friend.
49	23	"Night Hike!"	31 October 2009
The community is taking an evening hike! Muffin and Jordan follow the group for a while but soon chase a cricket down a new path. They find themselves lost and alone in the dark, until a friendly community of fireflies shows them the way back to 3rd and Bird.
50	24	"Play Nicely!"	28 November 2009
Mr. Lovebird and Mr. Beakman get very competitive at the 3rd and Bird Community Picnic, and end up quarrelling. It's up to Muffin and Jordan to show their elders how to play nicely.
51	25	"Talent Show!"	14 March 2010
The community is having a talent show at the Bird Theatre, and every birdy is excited to perform. Muffin and Jordan won't reveal what their act is, and the suspense builds and builds.
52	26	"Jamaica!"	31 July 2010
The Lovebirds fly to Jamaica for their holiday. A friendly parrot named Ziggy shows them around the beautiful island, but Samuel misses 3rd and Bird.

== Broadcast ==
BBC Worldwide acquired global distribution rights to the series in October 2007.

In 2009, Treehouse TV acquired Canadian broadcast rights. In 2010, Disney Channel bought US broadcast rights to the show and aired it on Disney Junior beginning in September 2011. The program continued to air and was rolled out to foreign countries including the United States, where it aired dubbed into American English, as well.

== Merchandising ==
In January 2009, BBC Worldwide announced plans to release 3rd & Bird merchandise, including wooden stacking toys, pull along vehicles, play sets and musical instruments, as well as wheeled toys, including trikes, scooters, and ride-ons. The product line was released in spring 2010

Two compact discs featuring the 3rd & Bird theme song (along with many other CBeebies show tracks) were released by CBeebies titled CBeebies: Song Time (2010) and CBeebies: The Album (2012).

== DVDs/Books ==
A DVD titled Bird's The Word! and containing 8 episodes of the series was released in March 2009, accompanied by a series of books tying into the show. A second DVD, Muffin Land!, was released in June 2009.
