= Meet the Small Potatoes =

2013 film

- Directed by: Josh Selig
- Written by: Josh Selig
- Starring: Malcolm McDowell
- Production company: Shout!
- Release date: February 15, 2013 (United States)
- Running time: 72 minutes
- Country: United Kingdom
- Language: English

Meet the Small Potatoes is a 2013 family mockumentary film written and directed by Josh Selig and starring Malcolm McDowell. It is a follow-up to Selig's 2011 television series Small Potatoes. The film serves as both a prequel to and spinoff of the show. The special premiered on Disney Jr. on February 15, 2013, using the voices and likenesses of real fans for the film's man on the street interviews.

== Plot ==
The film is presented in the style of a mockumentary documenting the history of The Small Potatoes, a band of anthropomorphic singing potatoes. Narrative segments are interspersed with talking head interviews with the band's friends, manager Lester Koop (McDowell), and man on the street interviews with the band's fans (all of whom are potatoes).

The Small Potatoes' trajectory roughly follows trends in American popular music through the second half of the 20th century: The Potatoes start as a country and western band in Idaho in the 1940s, before finding popularity first as rock and roll and then doo wop singers in the 1950s. They reach the peak of their popularity in the 1960s as a British Invasion style act, followed by their experimenting with psychedelic rock after a trip to India. Through the Potatoes' career, there is constant infighting between lead singer, Ruby, and Nate, the songwriter, on what the band's image should be. Olaf, a fat potato, struggles with his weight, which Lester tries to help him keep under control, while Chip is the quiet, detached voice of reason.

Conflict worsens between Nate and Ruby in the 1970s. Ruby, as the frontwoman of the group, begins to style herself as a diva and attempts to reform the band's image around herself, turning the group into a disco act. Nate, meanwhile, wants to keep the band socially relevant as a punk rock group. Tensions come to a head in the 1980s during the age of commercialization, when Ruby convinces the group to sell out by lending their names to a line of children's toys. The toys are all poorly manufactured and fall apart, displeasing customers. The negative backlash causes the group to break up.

Most of the members go on to get regular jobs while Ruby reinvents herself as a Britney Spears-style solo pop act in the 1990s. The group's old albums remain popular, though, and Ruby becomes depressed at the loss of her friends. The group enjoys a resurgence in popularity on the internet in the 2000s, leading to Chip, Olaf, and Nate reuniting for a reunion tour. Ruby surprises everyone by showing up at the theater on the night of their opening concert and singing with the band. The group finally resolves all of their old hostilities and Lester arranges for them to make a comeback tour.

== Production ==
Based on the success of his television series, Selig was commissioned by Disney to come up with an original, forty-five minute feature to air on Disney Jr. Prior to the film's debut, parents were invited to submit their children's photos in a Facebook contest to have their likenesses animated into the film as the Potatoes' fans in the man-on-the-street segments.

Many of the songs are taken from episodes of the television show, here worked into the context of concert sequences. Tony Award-winning composer Jerry Bock wrote some of the original songs, one of his final projects before his death. In keeping with the show's educational nature, the film functions to teach children about the history of popular music in the 20th century.

== Reception ==
The film received mixed reviews. Emily Ashby, writing for Common Sense Media, gave the film 4/5 stars; she criticized the film's lack of relevancy for preschoolers, but praised it for its positive message and its usefulness as a tool for teaching older children about interpersonal skills and conflict resolution. Ashby further praised the level of interest for older audiences, stating "Meet the Small Potatoes clearly is written with the characters' older fans in mind, leaning on a clever mockumentary style (think Spinal Tap, but with food products) that younger kids just won't get."
