= Suzi Shelton =

American singer-songwriter

- Born: Susan Shelton; Cleveland, Ohio, United States
- Genre: Children's music
- Occupations: Singer, recording artist
- Years active: 2005–present
- Labels: Suzi Music, Inc.

Suzi Shelton is a children's music recording artist who has been performing music for kids around her home base in New York City for the past 10 years.

Growing up in Chesterland, Ohio, Suzi studied early childhood education and dance.

Shelton's first CD, Simply Suzi, featured original songs about animals, dreams and dessert, and received a positive review from Children's Music Web, Parents’ Choice and the iParenting Media Awards. Shelton was the featured artist and host of a DVD series from Gymboree Play & Music.
