= Toby, Elk County, Pennsylvania =

Unincorporated community in Pennsylvania, US

Toby, Pennsylvania
- Unincorporated community
- Location within the state of Pennsylvania Toby (the United States)
- Coordinates: 41°19′39″N 78°37′55″W
- Country: United States
- State: Pennsylvania
- County: Elk
- Township: Fox
- Elevation: 1,627 ft (496 m)
- Time zone: UTC-5 (Eastern (EST))
  - Summer (DST): UTC-4 (EDT)
- GNIS feature ID: 1193537

Toby is an unincorporated community and coal town in Elk County, Pennsylvania, United States.
