= The Time-Out Chair =

- Directed by: Josh Selig
- Written by: Josh Selig
- Music by: Mark Suozzo
- Production company: Little Airplane Productions
- Distributed by: Tribeca Film Institute
- Release date: May 3, 2003
- Running time: 6 minutes
- Country: United States
- Language: English

The Time-Out Chair is a short film written and directed by Josh Selig in 2002. It was produced by Little Airplane Productions, a New York studio that Selig co-founded with Lori Shaer. The film premiered at the 2003 Tribeca Film Festival and was later acquired by the Museum of Modern Art.

== Synopsis ==
The film follows a preschool-aged girl who leaves her classroom after being sent to the time-out chair. She spends the afternoon in the East Village of New York, dragging the chair behind her.

== History ==
The film's music was composed by Mark Suozzo. The Time-Out Chair was originally screened at the 2003 Tribeca Film Festival. The Museum of Modern Art in Midtown Manhattan acquired the film in 2004. It was included as part of the museum's family film screening on January 15, 2011. It was featured as the second short in MoMA's "Figuring Out Feelings" series on March 5, 2016.
