= Bill Schwab =

American photographer (born 1959)

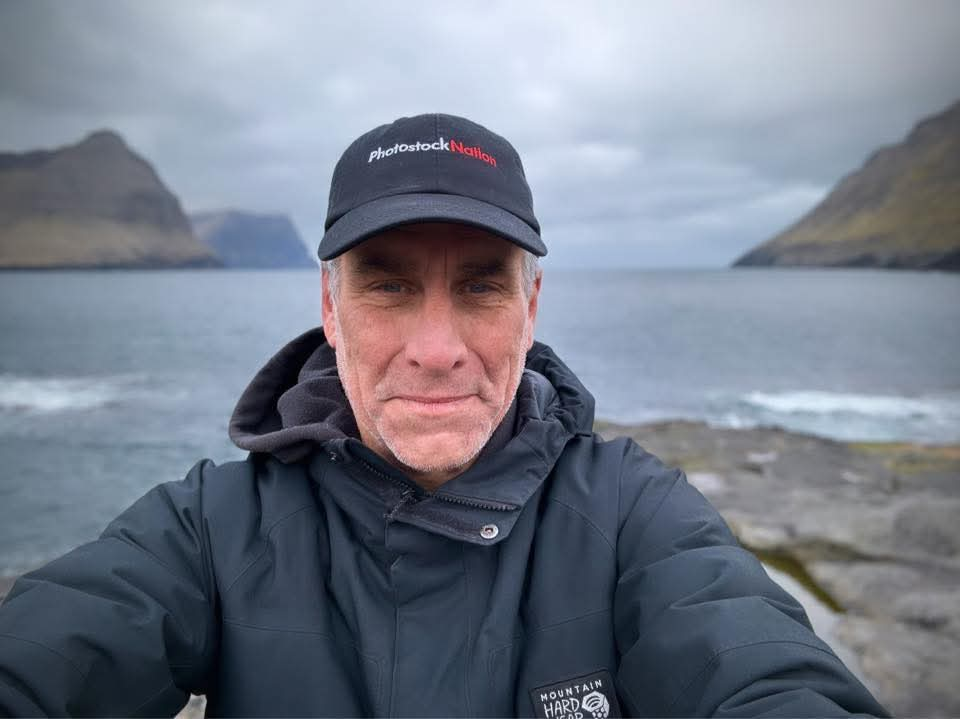
- Bill Schwab in the Faroe Islands, 2024
- Born: December 22, 1959; Detroit, Michigan, US
- Died: October 29, 2025 (aged 65); Ullapool, Ross and Cromarty, Scottish Highlands
- Education: Central Michigan University
- Years active: 1976–2025
- Known for: Photography
- Website: www.billschwab.com

Bill Schwab (born 1959) was an American photographer known for his emotionally charged yet peaceful urban and natural landscapes.

Born in Detroit, Michigan, he received a Bachelor of Fine Arts degree from Central Michigan University in 1983.

Schwab's career as a photographer and publisher spanned over 4 decades, with work in many private, corporate and museum collections around the world, including The Art Institute of Ohio – Cincinnati, Detroit Institute of Arts and the George Eastman House. He was a pioneer in the area of online representation and branding of his photographic art, having successfully managed a worldwide collector base for many years, as well as consulted with other artists and galleries on the subject. In addition to his work as a photographer, through his North Light Photographic Workshops, he facilitated classes in several photographic processes each year at his northern Michigan facility, as well as led expeditions of photographers to Iceland, the Faroe Islands and more. Bill was also founder and host of the "Photostock Festival", an annual gathering in June of photographers, collectors and enthusiasts for workshops, reviews, presentations and demos.

Having been shown in many group and solo exhibitions in the US and abroad since the early 1980s, Schwab's work continues to become more widely known and sought after.

== Photo books ==
- Bill Schwab: Photographs (North Light Press, 1999 ISBN 0-9765193-0-5)
- Gathering Calm: Photographs 1994 - 2004 (North Light Press, 2005 ISBN 0-9765193-2-1)
- Belle Isle (North Light Press, 2011 ISBN 978-0-9765193-5-5)
- Waterside (North Light Press, 2013 ISBN 978-0-9885888-2-0)
