= Josh Selig =

American screenwriter (born 1964)

- Born: May 12, 1964 (age 62); Upper West Side, Manhattan, New York, U.S.
- Education: Sarah Lawrence College
- Occupations: Television director, producer, writer
- Website: www.littleairplane.com

Joshua Selig (born May 12, 1964) is an American television producer and director. He won ten Daytime Emmy Awards for his work as a writer on Sesame Street. After leaving Sesame Street, Selig partnered with Lori Shaer to create a studio called Little Airplane Productions. Through Little Airplane, Selig produced Oobi for Noggin, Wonder Pets! for Nickelodeon, and 3rd & Bird for the BBC.

== Early life ==
Josh Selig was born on the Upper West Side of Manhattan. He began his career as a child actor on Sesame Street during its first two seasons. As a young adult, Selig attended Sarah Lawrence College, where he studied theater and poetry. He returned to Sesame Street in 1988 as a writer. He also worked on the Israeli-Palestinian and Polish adaptations of the show during the 1990s.

== Career ==
In 1998, he conceived the idea for Little Airplane Productions. The company was initially a joint effort between Selig and Lori Shaer (née Sherman). Until 2005, the studio's works were solely live-action. Oobi was the first original series produced by the company; it began as a series of interstitials in 2000 and later ran for two seasons of half-hour episodes. The series was heavily inspired by Selig's time as a Sesame Street writer; he based its puppet characters on a training method used by Muppet performers learning to lip-sync, in which they use their bare hands and a pair of ping pong balls instead of a puppet. In 2003, Selig wrote and directed a short film titled The Time-Out Chair. Written and directed by Selig, the film premiered at the 2003 Tribeca Film Festival and was later acquired by the Museum of Modern Art. Profits from Oobi allowed Selig to create an animation division at Little Airplane, leading it to shift to an animation-based studio.

Selig, formerly a member of the Writers Guild of America, East, left and maintained financial core status.

Selig created Go, Baby! in 2004 as a series for Playhouse Disney. In 2003, he directed two pilots for the Wonder Pets! series along with Jennifer Oxley. The show premiered in the United States on March 3, 2006 on Nickelodeon and Noggin. Selig opened two new branches of Little Airplane in London and Abu Dhabi in 2007. Josh Selig's first international co-production, 3rd & Bird, debuted on CBeebies in June 2008. He continued to produce short-form series throughout the 2010s. Small Potatoes, commissioned by Disney Junior, spawned a television movie that Selig directed in 2013. In the same year, he pitched a pilot titled The Jo B. & G. Raff Show! to Amazon Studios, which was not picked up. He is currently the creator and executive producer of Disney's P. King Duckling and of the South Korean series Super Wings.

== Filmography ==
Year	Title	Credit(s)	Ref.
1969–1971; 1988–2002	Sesame Street	Child actor (1969–1971); Writer (1988–2002)	
1999–2000	Little Bill	Head writer	
2000–2005	Oobi	Creator; Executive producer; Director (full-length episodes)	
2003	The Time-Out Chair	Writer; Director	
2003	Fisher-Price Baby Development videos	Producer	
2004	Go, Baby!	Creator	
2006	Tarzan: The Musical	Animation director (Son of Man segment)	
2006–2016	Wonder Pets!	Creator; Writer; Developer; Executive Producer	
2008–2010	3rd & Bird	Creator; Executive producer	
2010	Tobi!	Creator	
2010	The Olive Branch	Creator; Writer	
2011	Small Potatoes	Creator; Executive producer	
2013	Meet the Small Potatoes	Creator; Writer; Director	
2013–2014	Sing It, Laurie!	Creator; Executive producer	
2014	Domo Rock!	Writer; Director	
2014	The Jo B. & G. Raff Show! (Amazon Studios pilot)	Creator; Writer	
2015	Super Wings	Executive producer	
2016–2017	P. King Duckling	Creator; Executive producer	

== Awards and nominations ==
Year	Presenter	Category/Award	Work	Status	Ref.
1990	17th Daytime Emmy Awards	Outstanding Writing for a Children's Series (shared with other writers)	Sesame Street	Won	
1991	18th Daytime Emmy Awards	Outstanding Writing for a Children's Series (shared with other writers)	Sesame Street	Won	
1992	19th Daytime Emmy Awards	Outstanding Writing for a Children's Series (shared with other writers)	Sesame Street	Won	
1993	20th Daytime Emmy Awards	Outstanding Writing for a Children's Series (shared with other writers)	Sesame Street	Nominated	
1994	21st Daytime Emmy Awards	Outstanding Writing for a Children's Series (shared with other writers)	Sesame Street	Won	
1995	22nd Daytime Emmy Awards	Outstanding Writing for a Children's Series (shared with other writers)	Sesame Street	Won	
1996	23rd Daytime Emmy Awards	Outstanding Writing for a Children's Series (shared with other writers)	Sesame Street	Nominated	
1997	24th Daytime Emmy Awards	Outstanding Writing for a Children's Series (shared with other writers)	Sesame Street	Nominated	
1998	25th Daytime Emmy Awards	Outstanding Writing for a Children's Series (shared with other writers)	Sesame Street	Won	
1999	26th Daytime Emmy Awards	Outstanding Writing for a Children's Series (shared with other writers)	Sesame Street	Won	
2000	27th Daytime Emmy Awards	Outstanding Writing for a Children's Series (shared with other writers)	Sesame Street	Nominated	
2001	Parents' Choice Foundation	Television Gold Award	Oobi	Won	
2001	Coalition for Quality Children's Media	Kids First Endorsement Award	Oobi	Won	
2001	Coalition for Quality Children's Media	Best Children's Film or Video	Oobi	Nominated	
2001	28th Daytime Emmy Awards	Outstanding Writing for a Children's Series (shared with other writers)	Sesame Street	Won	
2002	29th Daytime Emmy Awards	Outstanding Writing for a Children's Series (shared with other writers)	Sesame Street	Won	
2003	30th Daytime Emmy Awards	Outstanding Writing for a Children's Series (shared with other writers)	Sesame Street	Won	
2004	Humanitas	Humanitas Prize for Children's Animation	Little Bill	Won	
2004	Parents' Choice Foundation	Television Silver Honor	Oobi	Won	
2008	Crain Communications	Crain's Small Business Award	N/A	Won	
2009	NHK Japan Prize	Best TV Series	Wonder Pets!	Won	
2009	Academy of Television Arts & Sciences Foundation	Innovation Award	Oobi	Won	
2010	2010 Gracie Awards	Outstanding Children/Adolescent Animated Program	Wonder Pets!	Won	
2010	BAMkids Film Festival	Best Short Film for Ages 2–5	Small Potatoes	Won	
2012	39th Daytime Emmy Awards	Outstanding Achievement in Music Direction and Composition	Wonder Pets!	Won	
2014	41st Daytime Emmy Awards	Outstanding Pre-School Children's Animated Program	Wonder Pets!	Nominated	
2014	41st Daytime Emmy Awards	Outstanding Achievement in Music Direction and Composition	Wonder Pets!	Nominated	
2015	3rd Canadian Screen Awards	Best Pre-School Program or Series	The Adventures of Napkin Man	Won	
