= P. King Duckling =

- Genre: Adventure; Comedy; Preschool; Slapstick
- Created by: Josh Selig; Chen Gu; Bo Fan
- Directed by: Eddy Bo Fan; Julian Kauffmann; Yihong Zhang; Mei Zhao; Swee Lin Jan Qing
- Voices of: Marc Thompson; Courtney Shaw; Benjie Randall
- Theme music composer: Josh Selig; Sam Retzer
- Composers: Sam Retzer; Dong Liu
- Countries of origin: United States; China
- Original language: English
- No. of seasons: 2
- No. of episodes: 78

Production
- Executive producers: Xiaqiu Zhong; Chen Gu; Josh Selig
- Producers: Nicole Torre; Mary Tai; Bing Yan
- Running time: 21 minutes
- Production companies: UYoung; Little Airplane Productions (season 1)

Original release
- Network: Disney Junior (season 1)
- Release: November 7, 2016 – April 14, 2017

P. King Duckling is an animated children's television series co-created by Josh Selig, Chen Gu, and Bo Fan. The series debuted its first season on Disney Junior in the United States on November 7, 2016 and ended it on April 14, 2017. It is one of the only Disney series that is not accessible on DisneyNOW.

On May 22, 2017, UYoung ordered a second season of P. King Duckling.

== Premise ==
P. King Duckling is about the title character, a young duck, who has adventures in the town of Hilly Hole with his two best friends, Wombat and Chumpkins.

== Characters ==
=== Main ===
- P. King (voiced by Marc Thompson) is a silly duck who loves to hop around and play with Wombat and Chumpkins. He's always very happy.
- Wombat (voiced by Courtney Shaw) is one of P. King's sidekicks from Australia. Her talent is art. She is also very smart.
- Chumpkins (voiced by Benjie Randall) is another one of P. King's sidekicks. He's a very techy pig with a big computer.

=== Major ===
- Mildred is an elderly beetle bug from Mexico.
- Walter/Walrus is a somewhat clumsy walrus.

=== Supporting ===
- Giraffe is a young adult girly giraffe.
- Elephant is an African elephant and he is Giraffe's friend.
- Puppy Kid is a childish Labrador Retriever pup.
- Uppity Moose is a character who likes tennis games.
- Maxine is a pink cat. She works in a diner.
- Anteater is a character who likes party things and dislikes trying not to damage the store.
- Paco is a Xoloitzcuintli (or a Mexican hairless pup) and he is Mildred's pet dog.
- Chameleon is sometimes a background character.
- Sir Scoops-a-Lot is a knight horse. He works in a medieval-themed ice cream truck at a medieval fair
- Baker is a light pink fox, he works in a Hilly Hole Bakery and likes making cakes and pastries.
- Inigo Murphy is a cow, he says a gibberish word "Moo" because he's somewhat a cow.
- Turtle is a character who likes Hilly Hole.
- Arma Dillo is an armadillo who likes clothes.
- Mrs. Flamingo is a flamingo from Spain who likes the Hilly Hole park.
- Madam Mayor is a character who likes stories.

=== Recurring ===
- Hippo is the new member of Wombat and the Hilly Boyz.
- Greg the Goose is the main antagonist in the series.
- Zoloton is a character who likes tricks.
- Mole is a mole who likes eating and digging, and dislikes wild animals.
- Mrs. Glockenspiel is a character who likes golf.
- Beverly Bison is a character who likes harmonies and golf.
- Garth is a character who likes golf and dislikes trying not to hit the houses.

=== Other ===
- Robo-Duckling is a character who likes taking garbage and painting the fence, and dislikes robots that cannot mess up.
- Marvin is a character who likes plants and dance parties.
- Melvin is a character who likes shows.
- The Bunny Family: Barry Bunny is a character who likes carrot smoothies, Buffy Bunny is a character who likes "Bon appetite", Bennett Bunny is a character who likes carrots and dislikes trying not to have fur sheds, and Bindy Bunny is a character who likes carrots.
- Butch is sometimes a background character.
- Dolph is sometimes a background character.
- Manny is a character who is also Walter's cousin.
- Bobo the Sheep is a character who is friends with P. King, Wombat and Chumpkins.

== Episodes ==
Season 1 (2016–17)

No.	Title	Directed by	Written by	Original release date	Prod. code	U.S. viewers (millions)
1	"Wombat's Big Surprise!"	Unknown	Unknown	November 7, 2016	TBA	0.62
P. King and Chumpkins plan a surprise party for Wombat.
2	"A Hill with a View"	Unknown	Unknown	November 7, 2016	TBA	0.62
After Wombat shows P. King a view of a hill, he wants to move there.
3	"Robo-Duckling"	Unknown	Unknown	November 8, 2016	TBA	0.74
P. King wants his chores done faster, so he makes a robot.
4	"Arts and Quacks"	Unknown	Unknown	November 8, 2016	TBA	0.74
P. King goes to Paris, France to make a big sculpture.
5	"Lights, Camera, Duckling!"	Unknown	Unknown	November 9, 2016	TBA	0.65
After seeing the movie Stink Bug, Come Home, P. King decides to make his own “serious” movie.
6	"Ring-a-Ding Duck"	Unknown	Unknown	November 9, 2016	TBA	0.65
The phone lines are ruined by a storm, so P. King starts his own system.
7	"Speed King Duckling"	Unknown	Unknown	November 10, 2016	TBA	0.77
Greg the Goose challenges P. King to race in the Hillyapolis Grand Prix.
8	"P. King's Cool Castle"	Unknown	Unknown	November 10, 2016	TBA	0.77
P. King makes an ice castle once a heatwave hits Hilly Hole.
9	"The Dog Fish"	Unknown	Unknown	November 11, 2016	TBA	0.66
P. King gets a new pet - a rare Siberian Dogfish!
10	"P. King's Great Jog"	Unknown	Unknown	November 11, 2016	TBA	0.66
P. King wants to find a brand new place to jog, so Chumpkins and Wombat take him to The Great Wall of China!
11	"Fowl Fashion"	Unknown	Unknown	November 14, 2016	TBA	0.74
P. King realizes he doesn't have enough money for high fashion, so he makes outfits out of garbage.
12	"A Day with a Panda"	Unknown	Unknown	November 14, 2016	TBA	0.74
P. King befriends Lee, a traveling panda but when Lee starts making friends with the citizens, it upsets P. King and realizes he didn't know that he invited him to come to Hilly Hole
13	"Turnip Ice Cream"	Unknown	Unknown	November 15, 2016	TBA	0.75
P. King’s new turnip ice cream becomes a hit in Hilly Hole.
14	"One Big Hoppy Family"	Unknown	Unknown	November 15, 2016	TBA	0.75
A family of snow bunnies moves into town, but their constant shedding causes problems for the citizens.
15	"Barnyard Ballyhoo"	Unknown	Unknown	November 16, 2016	TBA	0.63
Chumpkins joins the Barnyard Ballyhoo musical after realizing he can sing.
16	"Three Friends and a Baby"	Unknown	Unknown	November 16, 2016	TBA	0.63
The gang babysits a baby lemur, but the lemur proves to be tough to take care of.
17	"Will You Be My Mentor?"	Unknown	Unknown	November 17, 2016	TBA	0.71
P. King tries to find someone to be his mentor.
18	"It's a Wonderful Chumpkins"	Unknown	Unknown	November 17, 2016	TBA	0.71
Chumpkins thinks his inventions aren't good enough, so P. King shows him how Hilly Hole would be like without them.
19	"Wombats In the Wild"	Unknown	Unknown	November 18, 2016	TBA	0.74
P. King and the gang go to Australia to find Wombat’s family.
20	"Hi-Ho Inflato-Man!"	Unknown	Unknown	November 18, 2016	TBA	0.74
P. King becomes Inflato-Man, a superhero who uses balloons to help others.
21	"Wombat and the Hilly Boyz"	Unknown	Unknown	November 21, 2016	TBA	1.00
P. King and Chumpkins form a boy band, but tell Wombat she can't join because she's a girl.
22	"Discovery Duck"	Unknown	Unknown	November 21, 2016	TBA	1.00
P. King wants to discover a new world.
23	"The Tetherball King"	Unknown	Unknown	November 28, 2016	TBA	0.76
P King realises he is good at tetherball, but his sportsmanship is put to the test.
24	"P. King's Cookie Farm"	Unknown	Unknown	November 28, 2016	TBA	0.76
P. King becomes an organic farmer.
25	"Fly P. King, Fly!"	Unknown	Unknown	December 19, 2016	TBA	1.00
P. King attempts to learn how to fly.
26	"Wombat Has Fleas"	Unknown	Unknown	December 19, 2016	TBA	1.00
Fleas take over Wombat's fur, causing her fur to get shaved.
27	"Abraca-Duckling"	Unknown	Unknown	January 2, 2017	TBA	0.65
P King's dream to become a magician hits a roadblock when he realises he doesn't know any tricks.
28	"Wombat's Sleepover"	Unknown	Unknown	January 2, 2017	TBA	0.65
Wombat grows anxious about having a sleepover with new friends.
29	"Ball Hogs"	Unknown	Unknown	January 9, 2017	TBA	0.45
Wombat teaches Chumpkins how to play soccer
30	"My Uncle the Clown"	Unknown	Unknown	January 9, 2017	TBA	0.45
P. King's Uncle Popiah the Clown comes to visit Hilly Hole.
31	"Wash and Dry Duck"	Unknown	Unknown	February 14, 2017	TBA	0.57
P King bites off more than he can chew when he offers to do laundry for everyone in town.
32	"Zeus on the Loose"	Unknown	Unknown	February 14, 2017	TBA	0.57
Chumpkins jumps into action when a computer virus threatens the aquarium.
33	"The Clothes Make the Beast"	Unknown	Unknown	February 15, 2017	TBA	N/A
P. King and his friends get a makeover from Armadillo but realize that being famous isn't as important as being true to themselves.
34	"The Great Turnip Mystery"	Unknown	Unknown	February 15, 2017	TBA	N/A
Someone stole turnips from the garden while Chumpkins felt Upset over missing turnips.
35	"Nature Trail Tale"	Unknown	Unknown	February 16, 2017	TBA	N/A
P. King and his friends take a walk in the woods to enjoy peace and quiet, discovering the beauty of nature.
36	"Hilly Hole vs. Bumpy Bluffs"	Unknown	Unknown	February 16, 2017	TBA	N/A
P. King helps resolve a conflict between golfers and builders over a shared field by suggesting they turn it into a miniature golf course.
37	"Wombat is Tall"	Unknown	Unknown	February 17, 2017	TBA	N/A
When Walrus got a Tourist Tram, P. King's Gang entered the tram expect of Wombat while she is too small to ride, so she must be really tall to ride the Tram.
38	"P. King Daring"	Unknown	Unknown	February 17, 2017	TBA	N/A
P. King learns to put safety first without worrying too much and performs the safest stunt yet: skateboarding among the stars.
39	"A Day At Hills N’ Thrills"	Unknown	Unknown	February 20, 2017	TBA	N/A
P. King, Wombat and Chumpkins visit their favorite amusement park: Hills N' Thrills.
40	"Chumpkins’ Big Pig Day"	Unknown	Unknown	February 20, 2017	TBA	N/A
P. King celebrates Pig Day with his best friends, Chumpkins and Wombat, but gets caught up in his new phone.
41	"Bobo the Sheep"	Unknown	Unknown	February 27, 2017	TBA	N/A
P. King and the gang entered the Ferny Farms while they met a friendly sheep named Bobo.
42	"The Hilly Hotel"	Unknown	Unknown	February 27, 2017	TBA	N/A
When P. King invited Hilly Hole friends while he demolished. He take them to the Hilly Hotel.
43	"Marvelous Marvin"	Unknown	Unknown	April 10, 2017	TBA	N/A
P. King makes a new friend, Marvin the caterpillar.
44	"Lemonade Stand-Off"	Unknown	Unknown	April 10, 2017	TBA	N/A
Wombat and Chumpkins hold a contest to see who can make the tastiest lemonade.
45	"A Duck In the Dark"	Unknown	Unknown	April 11, 2017	TBA	N/A
P. King and his friends help Mildred dog-sit her hairless dog Paco at her spooky summer cottage on Creaky Leaky Road.
46	"My Friend the Mole"	Unknown	Unknown	April 11, 2017	TBA	N/A
It's snowing today. P. King and Best Friends meet a new friend Mole while they go sledding with his friends.
47	"Knight, Princess and Cuddly Dragon"	Unknown	Unknown	April 12, 2017	TBA	N/A
P. King, Wombat and Chumpkins embark on a quest to help the princess who was trapped by the baby dragon at the Hilly Hole Renaissance Festival.
48	"Hilly Hole In Time"	Unknown	Unknown	April 12, 2017	TBA	N/A
The gang time travels and meets a T-Rex.
49	"Mildred and the Moon"	Unknown	Unknown	April 13, 2017	TBA	N/A
P. King tries to help Mildred make a new friend.
50	"Arma Dillo’s Birthday Blues"	Unknown	Unknown	April 13, 2017	TBA	N/A
It's Arma Dillo's birthday, so P. King invited him for a party to celebrate his own birthday.
51	"A City Under the Sea"	Unknown	Unknown	April 14, 2017	TBA	N/A
P. King and the gang encounter some issues while visiting Walrus in Seaweed City.
52	"A Tale of Two Ducklings"	Unknown	Unknown	April 14, 2017	TBA	N/A
P. King grows jealous of his cousin Dolph when he comes to visit.

== Broadcast ==
Disney Junior has picked up P. King Duckling to air on its American, Latin American, Indian, Korean, and Southeast Asian channels. In Sweden, the show aired on SVT in Swedish, and in China, the show aired on CCTV-14 Kids Channel in Chinese, both following the show's sale to Disney Junior in the United States. The show is also available on Netflix from November 7, 2017 until May 6, 2021.

== Home media ==
A DVD release of the series, titled "P. King Duckling: Seize the Day!", was released by Shout! Factory on September 12, 2017. A second DVD titled "P. King Duckling: Discovery Duck" was released on December 12, 2017, and a third DVD titled "P. King Duckling: Lights, Camera, Duckling!" was released on March 20, 2018.
