= Tobey =

Tobey is both a surname and unisex given name of Irish origin.

Notable people with the name include:

== Surname ==
- Alton Tobey (1914–2005), American painter, artist, illustrator, and teacher
- Charles W. Tobey (1880–1953), American politician from New Hampshire and senator 1939–1953
- David Tobey (1898–1988), American professional basketball referee
- Edward Silas Tobey (1813–1891), American businessman, Postmaster of Boston, and president of the American Missionary Association
- Franklin W. Tobey (1844–1878), American politician
- John Williams Tobey (1827–1909), American politician, architect, carpenter, and builder
- Kenneth Tobey (1917–2002), American stage, film, and television actor
- Mark Tobey (1890–1976), American abstract expressionist painter
- Mike Tobey (born 1994), American-Slovenian professional basketballer
- Paul Tobey (born 1962), Canadian pianist and composer
- Ray Tobey (born 1965), American computer and video game programmer
- William H. Tobey (1799–1878), American politician

== Given name ==
- Tobey Black (fl. 1994–), Canadian rock musician, lead vocalist, and guitarist for Maow
- Tobey Butler (born 1959), American NASCAR driver
- Tobey Maguire (born 1975), American actor and film producer

== Other uses ==
- "Tobey" (song), by Eminem, Big Sean, and BabyTron, 2024

== See also ==
- Toby (given name), list of people with the name
- Toby (surname), list of people with the name
- Tobey (given name), list of people with the name
