= Toby (surname) =

Toby is a surname. Notable people with the surname include:

- Allira Toby, Australian footballer
- Arthur Toby (1903–1984), Australian rugby union and rugby league player
- Darren Toby (born 1982), Trinidadian footballer in the United States
- Frederick Toby (1888–1963), Australian cricketer
- Gabriel Toby, Nigerian politician and economist, Deputy Governor of Rivers State from 1999 to 2007
- Joseph Toby (born 1989), Sierra Leonean-American soccer player
- Ronald Toby (born 1942), American historian, academic, writer and Japanologist
- Ryan Toby (born 1978), American soul singer, songwriter, producer and actor

== See also ==
- Tobey, another surname
