= List of Wonder Pets! episodes =

The following is a list of episodes from the animated series Wonder Pets! and its predecessor shorts Linny the Guinea Pig. The series debuted on March 3, 2006, as part of the Nick Jr. block on the Nickelodeon cable channel. Some episodes from the third season, which completed production in 2010, only aired on the separate Nick Jr. Channel.

== Series overview ==
Season	Episodes	Originally aired	
Season	Episodes	First aired	Last aired
Shorts	2	2003	2003
1	20	March 3, 2006	May 23, 2008
2	20	October 19, 2007	July 26, 2010
3	22	April 22, 2009	October 17, 2016

== Episodes ==
=== Shorts (2003) ===
Title	Original release date
"Linny the Guinea Pig in Space"	2003
In her very first adventure, Linny travels to outer space.
"Linny the Guinea Pig Under the Ocean"	2003
Linny finds herself in the ocean after diving into a fish tank.

=== Season 1 (2006–08) ===
No. overall	No. in season	Title	Original release date
1	1	"Save the Dolphin!"	March 3, 2006
1	1	"Save the Chimp!"	March 3, 2006
The Wonder Pets travel to Hawaii to save a young dolphin caught in a fishing net. The Wonder Pets rig their Flyboat for intergalactic travel and head for Outer Space to rescue a baby chimpanzee before a meteor strikes him.
2	2	"Save the Unicorn!"	March 3, 2006
2	2	"Save the Penguin!"	March 3, 2006
The Wonder Pets take a mythical journey into a storybook for the first time to save a baby unicorn whose horn is stuck in a tree. The Wonder Pets are called to Antarctica’s South Pole to save a baby penguin who has gotten stuck on a floating iceberg.
3	3	"Save the Sea Lions!"	March 6, 2006
3	3	"Save the Kangaroo!"	March 6, 2006
The Wonder Pets help resolve a tug of war between two sea lions over a fish-treat in wild Alaska. Later, they have to help the baby sea lions get to safety before a huge wave washes them both off the rock. The Wonder Pets travel to Australia in the Outback to help a kangaroo joey find his mother before dark.
4	4	"Save the Caterpillar!"	March 7, 2006
4	4	"Save the Crane!"	March 7, 2006
The Wonder Pets go to Greece to help an inchworm whose caterpillar friend is changing into a butterfly. The Wonder Pets travel to Japan into a Sumi-e painting to save a baby crane whose nest is threatened by a volcano before it starts to erupt.
5	5	"Save the Duckling!"	March 8, 2006
5	5	"Save the Kitten!"	March 8, 2006
Linny and Tuck have to save Ming-Ming before it starts to rain once she ventures out, only to get stranded on the schoolhouse's roof after getting covered in tree sap, which leaves her unable to fly. The Wonder Pets go to Venice and use a gondola to help save a kitten on floating driftwood before she floats out to sea.
6	6	"Save the Pigeon!"	March 9, 2006
6	6	"Save the Dinosaur!"	March 9, 2006
The Wonder Pets travel to New York City to save a baby pigeon before she falls off the nose of the historic Statue of Liberty. For the first time ever, the Wonder Pets time-travel to the prehistoric era of San Antonio to help a baby Triceratops who is stuck between large rocks before they fall.
7	7	"Save the Cow!"	March 10, 2006
7	7	"Save the Skunk!"	March 10, 2006
The Wonder Pets travel to the farmlands of Oklahoma to rescue a baby cow who has been blown into a tree by a tornado. The Wonder Pets look after Ollie, a visiting bunny, and invite him along as they save a baby skunk trapped in a rosebush in a forest of Arkansas.
8	8	"Save the Swan!"	March 13, 2006
8	8	"Save the Puppy!"	March 13, 2006
The Wonder Pets travel to Tchaikovsky's Swan Lake to help a young swan who is hiding in a bucket because he is afraid to dance. The Wonder Pets travel to a suburban home on Long Island, New York where a puppy needs to urinate outside, but is having trouble using his doggy door.
9	9	"Save the Tree!"	March 14, 2006
9	9	"Save the Elephant!"	March 14, 2006
The Wonder Pets travel to a dirty city lot and save a tree sapling by cleaning up the lot and planting a city garden with the help of various animals. The Wonder Pets travel to the grasslands of Kenya to save a baby elephant who is stuck in a large mud puddle.
10	10	"Save the Panda!"	March 15, 2006
10	10	"Save the Mouse!"	March 15, 2006
The Wonder Pets journey to China to rescue a baby panda who has eaten her way to the top of a bamboo tree and cannot get down. Linny is sick, so for the first time Tuck and Ming-Ming must save a baby mouse who is stuck inside a saxophone in the schoolhouse attic by themselves.
11	11	"Save the Camel!"	September 11, 2006
11	11	"Save the Ants!"	September 11, 2006
The Wonder Pets fly to Egypt to help a thirsty baby camel get home to his oasis. The Wonder Pets race to a picnic site to prevent a fight between two colonies of ants who are preparing to battle over some fruit.
12	12	"Save the Hedgehog!"	September 12, 2006
12	12	"Save the Crocodile!"	September 12, 2006
The Wonder Pets travel to jolly old England to rescue a baby hedgehog who is stuck inside a mouth of a large lion topiary. The Wonder Pets return to Egypt and visit the Nile River to help a baby crocodile who has a toothache. They introduce her to an Egyptian plover who is more than happy to become her personal dentist.
13	13	"Save the Bullfrog!"	September 13, 2006
13	13	"Save the Poodle!"	September 13, 2006
The Wonder Pets travel to the Louisiana Bayou to help an old bullfrog, who is having trouble moving, by making him a set of wheels so he can go for a swim with his grandchildren. The Wonder Pets travel to the fancy city of Paris to help a poodle who has gotten herself stuck at the top of the Eiffel Tower, all because she was made fun of by other dogs.
14	14	"Save the Sheep!"	September 14, 2006
14	14	"Save the Hermit Crab!"	September 14, 2006
The Wonder Pets travel to Switzerland to save a herd of sheep from falling off a cliff. During a vacation in Jalisco, Mexico, the Wonder Pets have to take a break from their vacation to help a hermit crab who has outgrown his shell.
15	15	"Save the Black Kitten!"	October 26, 2006
15	15	"Save the Yak, the Pig, and the Dancing Bear!"	October 26, 2006
On Halloween, the Wonder Pets, dressed for trick-or-treating, are called from a black kitten who is being scared by a ghost and stuck inside a doghouse. The Wonder Pets travel to a county fair where a yak, a pig, and a bear have ended up in a hot air balloon floating away while they are supposed to perform.
16	16	"Save the Reindeer!"	December 8, 2006
The Wonder Pets head to the North Pole to rescue Santa Claus' baby reindeer before she falls through a frozen lake on Christmas Eve.
17	17	"Save the Three Little Pigs!"	February 19, 2007
17	17	"Save the Owl!"	February 19, 2007
The Wonder Pets journey into a puppet theater to save the Three Little Pigs from the Big Bad Wolf. However, the tables turn when the Wolf tries to eat the Pets. The Wonder Pets get a midnight call from an owl in wild Oregon and must enlist the aid of fireflies to help rescue her.
18	18	"Save the Wonder Pets!"	April 23, 2007
After saving a baby blowfish stuck inside a sea plant, the Wonder Pets are accidentally swallowed by a whale. The blowfish, a seahorse, and a squid must come to the rescue and work together to help the Wonder Pets escape by tickling the whale to get him to open his mouth. Once freed, the Wonder Pets are greeted by a crowd of concerned creatures from across the sea, who tell them that their good deeds are appreciated.
19	19	"Save the Goldfish!"	June 28, 2007 May 23, 2008 (Note: This episode was first released in Save the Reindeer DVD on October 2, 2007.)
19	19	"Save the Baby Birds!"	June 28, 2007 May 23, 2008
The Wonder Pets fly to a child's bedroom where a baby goldfish in an aquarium is trapped inside a bubbling treasure chest. The Wonder Pets travel to a chilly tundra where three baby blue jays have no place to perch, except in a lonely moose’s antlers.
20	20	"Save the Egg!"	October 22, 2007
20	20	"Save the Flamingo!"	October 22, 2007
The Wonder Pets travel to Yellowstone National Park to rescue a bald eagle egg before it falls on the edge of a cliff. The Wonder Pets get a call from a flamingo in sunny Jamaica who is stuck in a marsh in a coloring book.

=== Season 2 (2007–10) ===
No. overall	No. in season	Title	Original release date
21	1	"Save Little Red Riding Hood!"	October 19, 2007
21	1	"Save the Turtle!"	October 19, 2007
The Wonder Pets return to Puppetland to save Little Red Riding Hood from the Big Bad Wolf. Linny and Ming-Ming must save Tuck before the approaching rain arrives when he gets stuck on a coral reef in the Caribbean Sea after diving into his pond and ending up lost.
22	2	"Save the Bee!"	October 23, 2007
22	2	"Save the Squirrel!"	October 23, 2007
The Wonder Pets shrink down to insect-size to help a young bee in the school garden make her first collection of nectar for her hive. The Wonder Pets travel to Coney Island to save a baby squirrel who is stuck in a ferris wheel and then to the tracks of a roller coaster in some cotton candy.
23	3	"Save the Chameleon!"	October 24, 2007
23	3	"Save the Platypus!"	October 24, 2007
The Wonder Pets travel to Madagascar to help a baby chameleon, who is being pursued by a cuckoo hawk, change color. Ming-Ming and Tuck are mean at each other and decide to give each other a silent treatment, which Linny tries to resolve, while trying to rescue a baby platypus stuck on a rock in a rushing river.
24	4	"Save the Dragon!"	October 25, 2007
24	4	"Save the Beaver!"	October 25, 2007
The Wonder Pets return to the Magical Land to help a young dragon who is floating away on a cloud. The Wonder Pets head to beautiful Vermont to help a young beaver whose family's dam has a hole in it.
25	5	"Save the Goslings!"	January 25, 2008
25	5	"Ollie to the Rescue!"	January 25, 2008
The Wonder Pets travel to Canada and help goslings learn to fly south by converting the Flyboat into a big goose. Ollie returns to the classroom and sets up his own animal rescue service to compete with the Wonder Pets in rescuing a baby chipmunk who is stuck inside a bird feeder.
26	6	"Kalamazoo!"	July 26, 2010 (Note: This episode was first released in Save the Nursery Rhyme! DVD on June 3, 2008.) June 5, 2009
26	6	"Help the Cow Jump Over the Moon!"	July 26, 2010 June 5, 2009
Ming-Ming visits her Aunt Eleanora at a local petting zoo in Kalamazoo, Michigan during a school holiday. Note: It is said that this episode was used as a backdoor pilot for a potential spin-off series, but it soon backfired. The Wonder Pets get a call from a pop-up nursery rhyme book where a young cow is having trouble jumping over the Moon. Not only is the cow upset, but also a dog is unable to laugh, a dish and a spoon cannot run away, and a cat cannot play her fiddle.
27	7	"Save the Ladybug!"	February 8, 2008
27	7	"Save the Sea Turtle!"	February 8, 2008
The Wonder Pets travel to the bogs of North Carolina to help a ladybug escape the closing leaves of a Venus flytrap. The Wonder Pets return to Japan to save a newly hatched sea turtle who cannot find her way to the Pacific Ocean.
28	8	"Save the Pangaroo!"	February 29, 2008
28	8	"Save the Cricket!"	February 29, 2008
The Wonder Pets help a kid-art ‘pangaroo’, a fictional parrot-kangaroo hybrid, who has been mistakenly thrown away in the trash. The Wonder Pets travel to the windy city of Chicago, Illinois to save a cricket who is caught in a soap bubble and floating away.
29	9	"Save the Armadillo!"	April 11, 2008
29	9	"Save the Itsy Bitsy Spider!"	April 11, 2008
The Wonder Pets return to Texas to help a young armadillo overcome his fears when he thinks his Old West-style town is haunted. The Wonder Pets later realize that what he thought was a ghost is only a swinging door, a player piano and a cactus. The Wonder Pets journey into a watercolor painting to save the Itsy Bitsy Spider who keeps getting washed off of the waterspout.
30	10	"Save the Beetles!"	April 21, 2008
30	10	"Three Wonder Pets and a Baby!"	April 21, 2008
The Wonder Pets journey to Liverpool to save a band of beetles, who are trapped in a yellow submarine entangled in kelp. Afterwards, the Wonder Pets attend their live performances for a big triumph. A diaper-wearing piglet comes to live in the classroom and the Wonder Pets each want to take care of her on their own, but they soon realize that using teamwork to take care of the large piglet is much challenging than they expected.
31	11	"Save the Gecko!"	April 28, 2008 May 1, 2008
31	11	"Save the What?"	April 28, 2008 May 1, 2008
The Wonder Pets play hide and seek with a gecko in a rainforest of Costa Rica and eventually, the gecko tries to follow them home after becoming fond with them. When the Wonder Pets try to receive a call from an animal in distress, their phone has technical issues due to a bend in it. With the viewer’s help, the Wonder Pets use the clues from their brief call to figure out who they need to save, as it reveals to be a hummingbird whose beak is stuck in an apple.
32	12	"Save the Griffin!"	April 29, 2008 May 2, 2008
32	12	"Save the Rooster!"	April 29, 2008 May 2, 2008
The Wonder Pets time travel to the Middle Ages and become brave knights to rescue a baby griffin whose tail is stuck beneath a stone and a drawbridge is starting to lower. The Wonder Pets travel to a nearby farm to help a rooster wake everyone up before sunrise.
33	13	"Here's Ollie!"	April 30, 2008 June 27, 2008
33	13	"Save the Visitor!"	April 30, 2008 June 27, 2008
When Ollie returns once again, he invites the Wonder Pets to his burrow for a sleepover. Although Ming-Ming is jealous, Linny persuades them that it will be fun to spend the night underground. Tuck fearfully wakes up in the middle of the night and finds an unexpected extraterrestrial visitor in the classroom. Luckily, the Wonder Pets form a bond with their new friend, who must return home soon, or be stuck on earth forever.
34	14	"Off to School!"	June 9, 2008
34	14	"Save the Pirate Parrot!"	June 9, 2008
The Wonder Pets travel back to the ocean and revisit Baby Blowfish. There, they help her overcome her separation anxiety on her first day of Fish Preschool. The Wonder Pets journey into a clay diorama to help a parrot reunite with her peg-legged pirate.
35	15	"Save the Bengal Tiger!"	September 8, 2008
In this Bollywood extravaganza, the Wonder Pets receive a serious call from a young white Bengal tiger in India who has a thorn stuck in her paw.
36	16	"Save the Nutcracker!"	December 8, 2008 (Note: This episode was first released in Save the Nutcracker! DVD on October 7, 2008.)
On Christmas Eve, a mouse king emerges from a picture book in the classroom and mischievously steals the Wonder Pets’ nutcracker present. The Wonder Pets must venture into the book and save the nutcracker.
37	17	"Save the Rat Pack!"	February 12, 2009 (Noggin); March 20, 2009 (Nickelodeon)
37	17	"Save the Fiddler Crab!"	February 12, 2009 (Noggin); March 20, 2009 (Nickelodeon)
The Wonder Pets travel to the dazzling casino city of Las Vegas, Nevada to assist three performing rats (Ben Vereen) who are having trouble working together on their song and a dance routine. The Wonder Pets journey to a small village in old Russia to save a fiddler crab who is stuck on a roof.
38	18	"Join the Circus!"	March 9, 2009 (Note: This episode was first released in Join the Circus DVD on February 24, 2009.)
It is summer vacation, and the Wonder Pets rescue a young circus lion named Cubby from falling off a circus train. The penguin ringmaster is impressed with the Wonder Pets, that he offers them jobs at their local circus, but a jealous Linny hates this and wishes they were heroes again instead of performers. Soon after they rescue the animals from a trapeze, they start to miss their home and decide to return to square one.
39	19	"Save the Old White Mouse!"	March 17, 2009 March 16, 2009
39	19	"The Adventures of Bee & Slug!"	March 17, 2009 March 16, 2009
When Bernie the old white mouse (Jerry Stiller) gets stuck in a cuckoo clock, the Wonder Pets travel to Linny's grandmother's (Anne Meara) local nursing home to save him. Bee and Slug mistakenly take the Flyboat for an unexpected joyride while the Wonder Pets have to rescue a baby fox cub that quickly gets out of control.
40	20	"Save the Hound Dog!"	March 19, 2009 March 18, 2009
40	20	"Save the Glowworm!"	March 19, 2009 March 18, 2009
The Wonder Pets travel to Memphis, Tennessee to save a young hound dog in a mansion who is stuck inside a jukebox. The Wonder Pets help a glowworm discover what she is good at glowing.

=== Season 3 (2009–16) ===
No. overall	No. in season	Title	Original release date
41	1	"Save the Raccoon!"	April 22, 2009
41	1	"Save the Loch Ness Monster!"	April 22, 2009
The Flyboat accidentally breaks down while the Wonder Pets attempt to rescue a baby raccoon stuck in a recycling bin. Linny determines a mysterious phone call has come from the Loch Ness Monster, nicknamed Nessie, in Scotland, who needs their help because her flipper is stuck under a rock.
42	2	"Save the Cool Cat and the Hip Hippo!"	May 18, 2009
42	2	"Tuck & Buck!"	May 18, 2009
The Wonder Pets return to New York City to help a cat (Eartha Kitt) and a hippo (Jon Hendricks) learn how to take turns at a jazz performance in Greenwich Village. Tuck's cool and coordinated older cousin, Buck, visits the classroom. During his visit, the Wonder Pets notice that Buck is a failure at using teamwork, but then he ends up stuck on the schoolhouse cubby.
43	3	"Save the Mermaid!"	May 19, 2009
43	3	"Save the Pony Express!"	May 19, 2009
The Wonder Pets return to the clay diorama to help a mermaid who wants to be a pirate, but learns that she must love herself. The Wonder Pets time travel to the Old West to help a pony make her first delivery as part of the famous Pony Express before sunset.
44	4	"Save the Honey Bears!"	May 20, 2009
44	4	"Save the Stinkbug!"	May 20, 2009
The Wonder Pets journey to Happyland Forest to help two bears named Teddy and Betty learn how to share a pot of honey. The Wonder Pets are called from a stinkbug who does not know how to bathe.
45	5	"The Amazing Ollie!"	May 21, 2009
45	5	"Help the Monster!"	May 21, 2009
When Ollie vanishes into a magician's hat, the Wonder Pets must rescue him once more. The Wonder Pets help a baby monster, who is throwing a tantrum and knocking over buildings in her toy city.
46	6	"A Job Well Done!"	May 22, 2009
46	6	"Save the Rhino!"	May 22, 2009
To celebrate their 100th rescue, Linny presents Ming-Ming and Tuck with a special home movie, only to discover a mouse inside the film projector. The Wonder Pets journey to Tanzania to help a baby rhino find a friend.
47	7	"Save the Bat!"	October 26, 2009
47	7	"Save the Donkey!"	October 26, 2009
The Wonder Pets travel to Transylvania to help a baby bat who is afraid of the dark. The Wonder Pets head to the Old Globe Theatre in London to help a donkey who is unprepared for his performance.
48	8	"Save the Lovebugs!"	May 1, 2010
48	8	"Save the Skunk Rocker!"	May 1, 2010
The Wonder Pets travel to the Florida Everglades to reunite a pair of Lovebugs on Valentine's Day. The Wonder Pets head to Manchester, England where a skunk rocker cannot find a band to play with him.
49	9	"Help the Easter Bunny!"	February 3, 2010
49	9	"Save the Visitor's Birthday Party!"	February 3, 2010
The Easter Bunny is feeling ill, so the Wonder Pets must help Ollie fill in for him and save Easter. The Wonder Pets travel to space to attend the Visitor's birthday party.
50	10	"How It All Began!"	April 9, 2010 (Note: This episode was first released in The First Rescue DVD on April 5, 2010.)
In a big special, Linny tells Tuck, Ming-Ming, and Ollie the backstory of how the Wonder Pets first met via flashbacks that show how Linny met Tuck and Ming-Ming when they were younger, and how they discovered teamwork. Their very first rescue was helping a beached baby whale in Nova Scotia.
51	11	"Happy Mother's Day!"	May 7, 2010
51	11	"Save the Sun Bear!"	May 7, 2010
It is Mother's Day and the Wonder Pets are taking cookies to Linny's Granny Winny (Anne Meara). But upon meeting many mothers along the way, they run out of cookies. The Wonder Pets travel to Bali, Indonesia to save a baby sun bear up on a statue.
52	12	"Save the Vixen!"	August 8, 2016
52	12	"Teach an Old Dog New Tricks!"	August 8, 2016
Set in a black-and-white Film noir fashion, The Wonder Pets travel to the film capital of Hollywood, California to help a vixen whose diamond-studded collar has mysteriously vanished. The Wonder Pets go to see a vaudeville show and meet an Old Dog performer.
53	13	"Save Humpty Dumpty!"	July 22, 2010
53	13	"Save the Meerkats!"	July 22, 2010
The Wonder Pets return to the pop-up book and save Humpty Dumpty who is teetering precariously on a wall. The Wonder Pets head back to Africa to show a colony of meerkats the joys of voting when they cannot agree on how to handle a lurking jackal.
54	14	"Save the Rock Lobster!"	July 8, 2010
54	14	"Help the Houseguest!"	July 8, 2010
The Wonder Pets travel to Cape Cod, Massachusetts to help a trapped lobster free himself before the trap is raised. Floppy the Elephant comes to the classroom to sleep over with Tuck. The Wonder Pets must help Floppy when he gets homesick.
55	15	"Adventures in Wonderland!"	October 15, 2010
Ollie is having a special party in Wonderland, but he forgets to invite the guests. It is now up to the Wonder Pets to find the Mad Hatter (Steven Tyler), the Cheshire Cat (Ziggy Marley) and the Queen of Hearts (Idina Menzel) and invite them to the party.
56	16	"Save the Moose in the Caboose!"	January 26, 2011
56	16	"Climb Everest!"	January 26, 2011
There are no animals in trouble, so the Wonder Pets brainstorm ideas and draw a colorful story about a moose stuck in a caboose that is heading for a cliff. The Wonder Pets travel to Mount Everest in Himalaya where, with the help of a goat sherpa, they save a baby snow leopard who is almost endangered.
57	17	"Save the Dancing Duck!"	October 16, 2011 (Note: This episode was first released in Ollie's Slumber Party! DVD on June 9, 2009.)
57	17	"Save the Dalmatian!"	October 16, 2011
The phone is not ringing, so Ming-Ming decides to explore the classroom in search of action, adventure and drama. But she gets in trouble again when she finds a pair of magic shoes that can make her dance forever. The Wonder Pets get a call from a dalmatian in a fire station who needs help sliding down the pole.
58	18	"Help the Groundhog!"	November 18, 2011
58	18	"Help the Lion Cub!"	November 18, 2011
The Wonder Pets travel to a snowy forest to help a chilly groundhog (Mandy Patinkin) get warm. The Wonder Pets journey to Africa again to help a lion cub learn to pounce and roar for the king. The lion cub dances for the king and he loves it because, after many years of the cub pouncing and roaring, he gives him something new.
59	19	"Back to Kalamazoo!"	August 17, 2012 (Note: "Back to Kalamazoo!" was first released in Sisters and Brothers DVD on February 8, 2011.)
59	19	"Bee and Slug Underground!"	August 17, 2012
When Aunt Eleanora asks Ming-Ming to watch Marvin, Ming-Ming returns to Kalamazoo, and this time, she invites the entire team. When Bee and Slug decide to explore what life is like underground, they accidentally get stuck in mud.
60	20	"The Bigger the Better!"	October 17, 2016
60	20	"Help Little Bo Peep!"	October 17, 2016
The Wonder Pets go through the shrink machine the other way and become giant-sized, but when they try to save a little white kitten stuck in their chimney, their giant sizes cause many problems. In this swinging Andrews Sisters-style show, the Wonder Pets get a phone call from Little Bo Peep in Puppetland, who has lost her three singing sheep.
61	21	"Save the Genie!"	August 12, 2016
The Wonder Pets get a call from a genie whose lamp has been dented beyond repair, and fly into a storybook Arabian desert and rub the Genie's lamp, setting him free. He then thanks the Wonder Pets and grants them each a wish for rescuing him.
62	22	"In the Land of Oz!"	July 20, 2013
The Wonder Pets get caught in a tornado and transported to the magical Land of Oz.
