= Tobias (disambiguation) =

Tobias is a given name.

Tobias may also refer to:

- Tobias (surname)
- Tobias, Nebraska, United States
- Tobias, Ohio, United States
- Tobias (bass guitar company)

== See also ==
- Tobias Barreto, Sergipe, Brazil
- Tobias Fornier, Philippines
- Tobías Bolaños International Airport, Costa Rica
- Tobias-Thompson Complex, a United States National Historic Landmark
