= Small Potatoes (2011 TV series) =

British children's television series

- Genre: Animated; Children's
- Created by: Josh Selig
- Starring: Pablo Cano Carciofa; Morgan Hartley; Shakira Riddell-Morales; Alice Wilkinson; Martha Forde; Felix Forde
- Countries of origin: United Kingdom; United States
- Original language: English
- No. of series: 1
- No. of episodes: 27

Production
- Running time: 3 minutes
- Production company: Little Airplane Productions

Original release
- Network: CBeebies, Disney Junior
- Release: 18 April – 25 December 2011

Small Potatoes is a British-American animated pre-school series written and directed by Josh Selig. It was produced by Little Airplane Productions from its second studio in London. The show features a group of four potatoes—Ruby, Olaf, Nate, and Chip—who sing songs. The show's music was composed by Jerry Bock.

27 shorts were produced. The series was aired on CBeebies in the UK, ABC Kids in Australia, and on the Disney Junior channel in the United States. It was followed by a motion picture in 2013, Meet the Small Potatoes. Small Potatoes is also available on BBC iPlayer.

== Characters ==
- Ruby: The smallest of the potatoes, who is orange and is the only female. She is the leader of the group.
- Olaf: The biggest of the potatoes who is wide and dark brown.
- Chip: A normal-sized light brown potato.
- Nate: A long and skinny potato who is medium red-brown.

== Episodes ==
Title	Original UK airdate	Plot	Episode Number
Imagination	18 April 2011	The Potatoes go on an imaginary hippy journey using their imaginations. The episode was available as an ebook for the iPhone in advance of debut, and screened at the BAMkids Film Festival in Brooklyn, New York.	1
Chip's Theme	19 April 2011	Chip sings a heartfelt song about being a potato.	2
Small Potato Rock	20 April 2011	The Small Potatoes introduce themselves and sing about their unique personalities.	3
Seasons	21 April 2011	The Potatoes celebrate the four seasons.	4
On a Farm	26 April 2011	The Small Potatoes meet their favorite farm animals.	5
I'm a Little Raindrop	27 April 2011	Ruby sings a techno song, where she imagines what it's like to be a raindrop.	6
Potato Train	28 April 2011	The Small Potatoes hop on board the Potato Train and chug through town.	7
The Small Potatoes Waltz	3 May 2011	The Small Potatoes travel to Victorian-era Vienna.	8
A Musical Show	4 May 2011	Small Potatoes sing and dance their way across the stage.	9
Art	5 May 2011	The Potatoes enter famous paintings and celebrate different ways art is created.	10
Feelings	6 May 2011	The Small Potatoes sing a guitar driven, rock and roll anthem celebrating their feelings.	11
Moon Baby	9 May 2011	Moon Baby observes the galaxy from up on the moon before floating back home.	12
This Is My Family	10 May 2011	The Small Potatoes sing about the importance of family and friends.	13
Marching Band	11 May 2011	The Small Potatoes lead a parade of musical instruments in a rousing anthem.	14
Dress Up	12 May 2011	The Potatoes dress up for a party and try on silly costumes.	15
Science	13 May 2011	The Potatoes explore science in a new wave music video.	16
Small Potatoes Conga	16 May 2011	The Small Potatoes conga their way through a fantastical world filled with fruit.	17
I Love To Dance The Flamenco	17 May 2011	The Small Potatoes visit Spain for a flamenco dancing fiesta.	18
Playtime	18 May 2011	The Small Potatoes enjoy playtime after school.	19
I Just Want To Be Me	19 May 2011	The Small Potatoes sing a punk rock anthem about how wonderful it is to just be yourself.	20
We're All Potatoes at Heart	20 May 2011	Potatoes from around the world celebrate the similarities and differences we all share.	21
You Can Be What You Want To Be	23 May 2011	The Small Potatoes have a disco pageant and explore different jobs.	22
I Love School	24 May 2011	Ruby sings a diva style ballad about the thing she loves more than anything else - school.	23
Today's The Perfect Day (Haircut)	25 May 2011	Ruby and her friends head off to the barbershop to get their hair styled.	24
Small Potatoes, Yes Sir	26 May 2011	The Small Potatoes sing about how they're no average spuds.	25
Potato Love	27 May 2011	The Small Potatoes sing about how wonderful it is to be alive and feel the Potato Love.	26
Christmas Baby	25 December 2011	It's Baby Potato's very first Christmas! Note: The song shares the tune of Moon Baby.	27

== Discography ==
=== Albums ===
Title	Album details
Small Potatoes	Released: 13 September 2011; Label: Little Airplane Productions; Format: Digital download, streaming

=== Singles ===
Year	Title	Album
2011	Christmas Baby	Christmas Baby EP
2013	Imagination (with Sky Blu)	Small Potatoes

=== DVD ===
2012 - Small Potatoes – The Complete Series
