= Save Toby =

Website

Toby the rabbit.

Save Toby was a joke website. The premise of the site was that the website's anonymous webmasters would eat Toby, a pet rabbit, unless they received $40,000 in donations to care for it. The website also spawned a book, fully titled: Save Toby: Only YOU have the power to save Toby!

== SaveToby.com ==
The website was created near the beginning of 2005. The website claimed that the owner found Toby wounded outside his home, and nursed the rabbit back to health, not believing it would survive. However, it did, and he was unable to afford to care for him. The website then claimed that, unless he received $50,000 in US dollars to pay for its care, he would eat the rabbit. The money could be either donated directly, or through purchasing "Save Toby" merchandise. The website includes several pictures of Toby, as well as many recipes that can be used to prepare and cook rabbit. The webmasters have remained anonymous, claiming they have received death threats. They go by the names "James" and "Brian"; however, "James" admits his name is a pseudonym.

The original deadline for receiving the money was June 30, 2005. When the deadline passed, they extended it to November 6, 2006, claiming that problems with PayPal made it impossible for people to donate money and that it was the only fair thing to do for Toby. It was later changed to Thanksgiving Day, 2006, because of the release of the book. In December 2006, the site announced that humor/games website bored.com had purchased the website, and therefore Toby had been saved. It is claimed that over $24,000 was collected by the website.

== Save Toby: Only YOU have the power to save Toby! ==
The book was released in September 2005. The book made a new threat: if 100,000 copies of the book were not sold, Toby would be eaten at Thanksgiving dinner. The number of copies of the book sold is unknown. The book includes pictures of Toby, and various recipes for cooking rabbit. It also has instructions on how to run a similar site.

== Public response & legitimacy ==
The cover of the Save Toby book.

The website received media attention throughout the United States and in other countries. Toby was also featured on NBC Nightly News.

The website made many animal rights activists upset, claiming that the owners were engaging in animal cruelty. They attempted to have the site removed; however, the company that hosted the site, Go Daddy, claimed that there was nothing illegal about the site and that "it was perfectly legal to eat a rabbit". PayPal accounts used for donations were often frozen due to complaints about the site.

There have also been questions about whether or not the site was legitimate. The owners, when asked, claimed that the site was completely serious and they would eat the rabbit. However, the nature of the website suggests it is a hoax or joke, a retelling of older jokes that threaten harm to an animal unless you buy a product (for example, National Lampoon once ran a cover with a gun aimed at a puppy, stating "If You Don't buy This Magazine, We'll Kill This Dog").

There were other similar websites in existence around the same time that threatened to eat a rabbit unless a monetary demand was met. One, Save Bernd!, inspired Save Toby. It demanded a 1,000,000 euro ransom. The site claims that "Bernd is gone", but not that he was eaten. Small letters at the bottom of the page make it clear that "It's a joke".

== See also ==
- Larry the Lobster
