= Jennifer Oxley =

American television director and writer

Jennifer Oxley is an American author, illustrator, animator, and television director. She is the executive producer for Wonder Pets: In The City, Vida the Vet, and Clifford the Big Red Dog (2019). She is also the co-creator of the PBS series Peg + Cat and the web series Ozzy Fox. She was the director of Wonder Pets! and 3rd & Bird, as well as the animator for the theme song and transitions on Oobi. She won an Emmy Award and a Humanitas Award for her work on the Nick Jr. series Little Bill.

She worked at Little Airplane Productions from 1999 to 2011 as the studio's creative director. While working at Little Airplane, she developed a style of cutout animation called "photo-puppetry," which was used in Oobi, Wonder Pets! and 3rd & Bird. She animated a series of short films titled Linny the Guinea Pig, which became the pilot episodes for the Wonder Pets! series. She directed eight short films that appeared on Sesame Street.

Oxley has also adapted a number of episodes of Wonder Pets! and Blue's Clues into books.
