= Ali Etesamifar =

Iranian Puppeteer, Puppet Maker and Designer

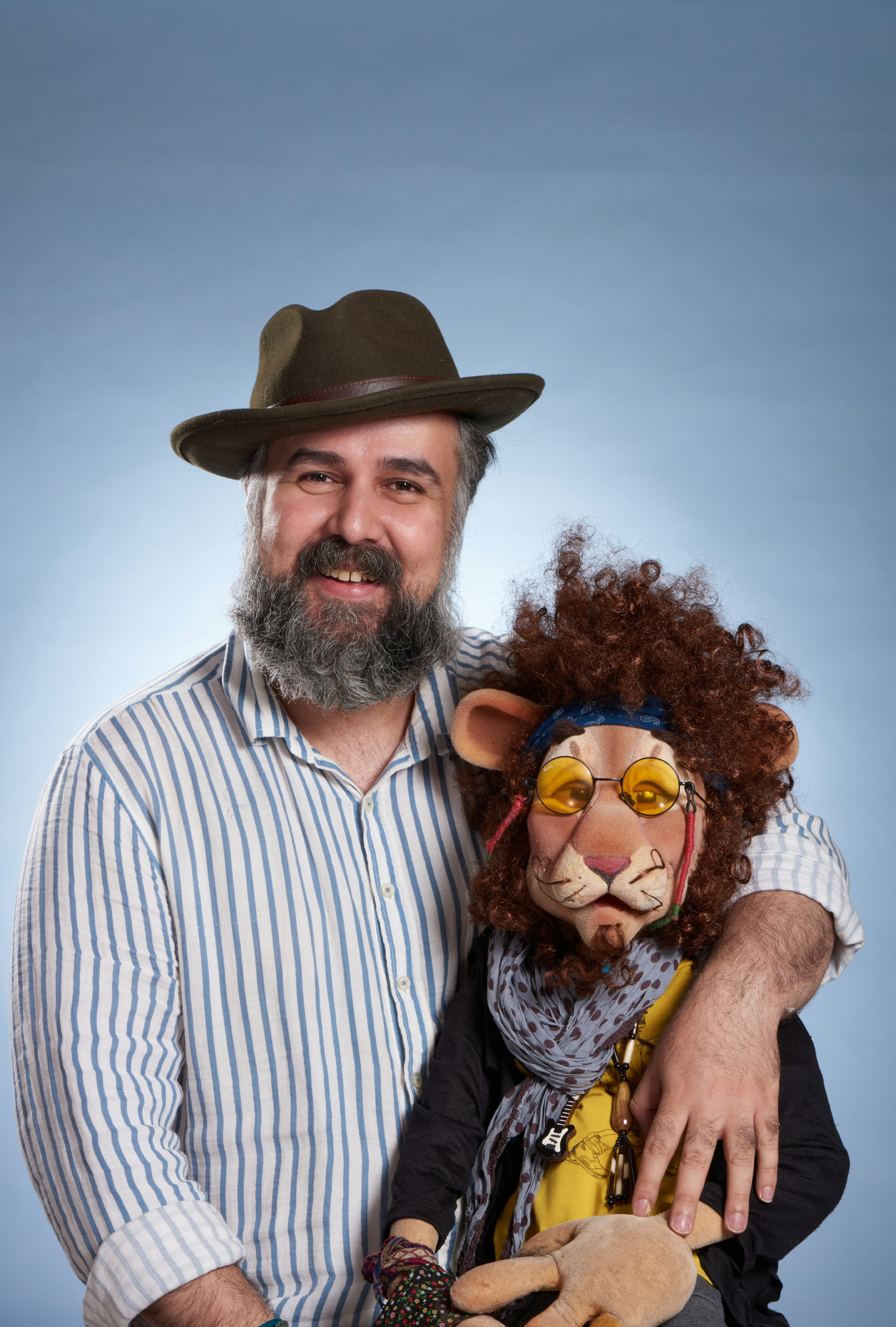
- Ali Etesamifar posed with his puppet character, Shiroo. Photographer : Alireza Dashti
- Born: Ali Etesamifar; July 15, 1990 (age 35); Qazvin
- Occupation: Puppeteer Puppet Designer Puppetry Teacher
- Years active: 2005–present
- Known for: Puppetry

Ali Etesamifar (Persian: علی اعتصامی‌فر; born in 1990 Qazvin, Iran) is an Iranian puppeteer, puppet maker, and puppet designer. He has appeared in many shows and features including the Kolah Ghermezi series (The One with The Red Hat) directed by Iraj Tahmasb and the feature film, City of Mice 2, directed by Marzieh Boroumand. He also directed an experimental puppet theatre called "The Garden Solo" (Painful Story of The Old Man) nominated by the 16th Mobarak International puppet theatre festival.

== Work ==
Year	Title	Job Title	Director
2005–2008	Aftabgardan	Puppeteer/Puppet maker	Mohsen Aghalar
2014	City of Mice 2	Puppet Maker/Puppeteer	Marzieh Boroomand
2014	Amir-Arsalan Naamdar Theatre	Puppet Maker	Hossein Cheraghi
2015–2018	Kolah Ghermezi	Puppeteer of Bache Famil	Iraj Tahmasb
2015	Kadoo Zari Theatre(Golden Pumpkin)	Puppet Maker and Puppet Designer/Actor	Mohammad Alami
2016	Garden Solo Theatre	Director/Writer/Puppet and Scene Designer	
2021	Shabakeye Kochak	Puppeteer of Shabrang and Milad	Amir Soltan Ahmadi
2021–	Nargil	Puppet Designer/Puppet Maker	Hamzeh Salehi / Ebrahim Amerian
2021–2022	Kelileh and Demneh	Puppet maker/ Puppeteer	Marzieh Boroomand

== Awards ==
- 1st and 2nd places in Puppet designing and making at the 11th International Student Puppetry Festival.
- 1st place in Puppet performing at the 14th International Student Puppetry Festival/ Blond redhead theater.
