= Oobi =

American children's television show

- Genre: Puppetry; Comedy
- Created by: Josh Selig
- Developed by: Essie Chambers
- Written by: Jenna Bradley; Natascha Crandall; Olga Humphrey; Christine Nee; Sascha Paladino; Melinda Richards
- Directed by: Pam Arciero; Tim Lagasse; Kevin Lombard; Scott Preston; Josh Selig
- Starring: Tim Lagasse; Stephanie D'Abruzzo; Noel MacNeal; Tyler Bunch
- Composers: Sacred Noise, Inc.
- Country of origin: United States
- Original language: English
- No. of seasons: 3 (Note: The show had three production cycles and three seasons. The first season is made up of 48 short-form episodes spanning 1-2 minutes each. The second and third seasons are made up of 52 long-form episodes in total, each one 10-13 minutes long.)
- No. of episodes: Shorts: 48; Long-form episodes: 52; (list of episodes)

Production
- Executive producer: Josh Selig
- Producers: April Chadderdon; Lisa Simon
- Production locations: Kaufman Astoria Studios; Astoria, Queens, New York
- Camera setup: Videotape; Multi-camera
- Running time: 1–2 minutes (season 1); 13 minutes (seasons 2–3)
- Production company: Little Airplane Productions

Original release
- Network: Noggin
- Release: 2000 – February 11, 2005

Related
- Oobi: Dasdasi

Oobi is an American children's television series produced by Little Airplane Productions for the Noggin channel. The show's concept is based on a training method used by puppeteers, in which they use their hands and a pair of glass eyes instead of a full puppet. The main character is a bare hand puppet named Oobi. The first season was a series of two-minute shorts. For its second and third seasons, it became a long-form series, with episodes lasting 13 minutes each. The show originally aired from 2000 to February 11, 2005, with reruns continuing through March 18, 2013.

The series was created by Josh Selig. He came up with the idea for Oobi while watching bare-handed puppeteers audition for Sesame Street. The main characters were played by Tim Lagasse, Stephanie D'Abruzzo, Noel MacNeal, and Tyler Bunch. All of the puppeteers were veteran Muppet performers.

Oobi was a breakout success for Noggin. It received positive reviews from critics, with praise for the puppeteers' performances, the visual style, and the show's appeal toward multiple age groups. The Age reported that the show developed a strong cult following among older viewers, and Noel MacNeal has said that the show's fans range from amateur puppeteers to "college-age stoners." In 2008, a fan site called OobiEyes.com ran a YouTube promotion, which inspired a community of early YouTubers to make videos with their own Oobi-style puppets.

The show received a variety of awards, including from the Television Academy and Parents' Choice. Oobi had a Nielsen rating of 2.35 among Noggin viewers by 2004, becoming Noggin's highest-rated series at the time. It is the most widely distributed Noggin show, having aired in over 23 markets worldwide by 2005. A foreign adaptation called Oobi: Dasdasi premiered in 2012 and ran for 78 episodes in the Middle East.

== Plot ==
The show takes place in a quaint, old-fashioned neighborhood where hand puppets live and act like people. The main character is a curious 4-year-old named Oobi who likes to explore the outside world. He lives in a single-story house with his little sister, Uma, and his grandfather, Grampu. Uma is very overdramatic and, depending on the day, she can be either excited or completely stressed out. Grampu is laid-back and encourages the kids to learn new things, but he is also rather unlucky and always has to clean up the kids' messes. Oobi has a best friend, Kako, who lives across the street and likes to visit.

Most episodes are about Oobi learning about something for the first time, like a new place, a new game, or a holiday. According to Noggin, the show was meant to mirror the stage of early childhood "when everything in [the] world is new and incredible" and "when each revelation helps build a sense of mastery and self-confidence." The characters only talk in simple sentences, based on the speech structure of a child just starting to talk. For example, "Uma, school, first day" is said in place of "It's my first day of school." The show was meant to help develop social skills, early literacy, and logical thinking.

In season 1, the episodes are simple shorts about Oobi making new discoveries. In season 2, the episodes were extended and followed a format made up of three parts. The first part is a story like the earlier shorts. The second part is a set of interviews between the puppets and human families, centering on the main story's topic. The last part is an interactive game (usually rhyming, guessing, or memory). When Oobi started a third season in 2004, the game segments were dropped and replaced with longer stories. Interviews were still an important part of the show, but instead of being shown after the story, these segments were shortened and played as transitions between scenes.

== Characters ==
=== Main ===
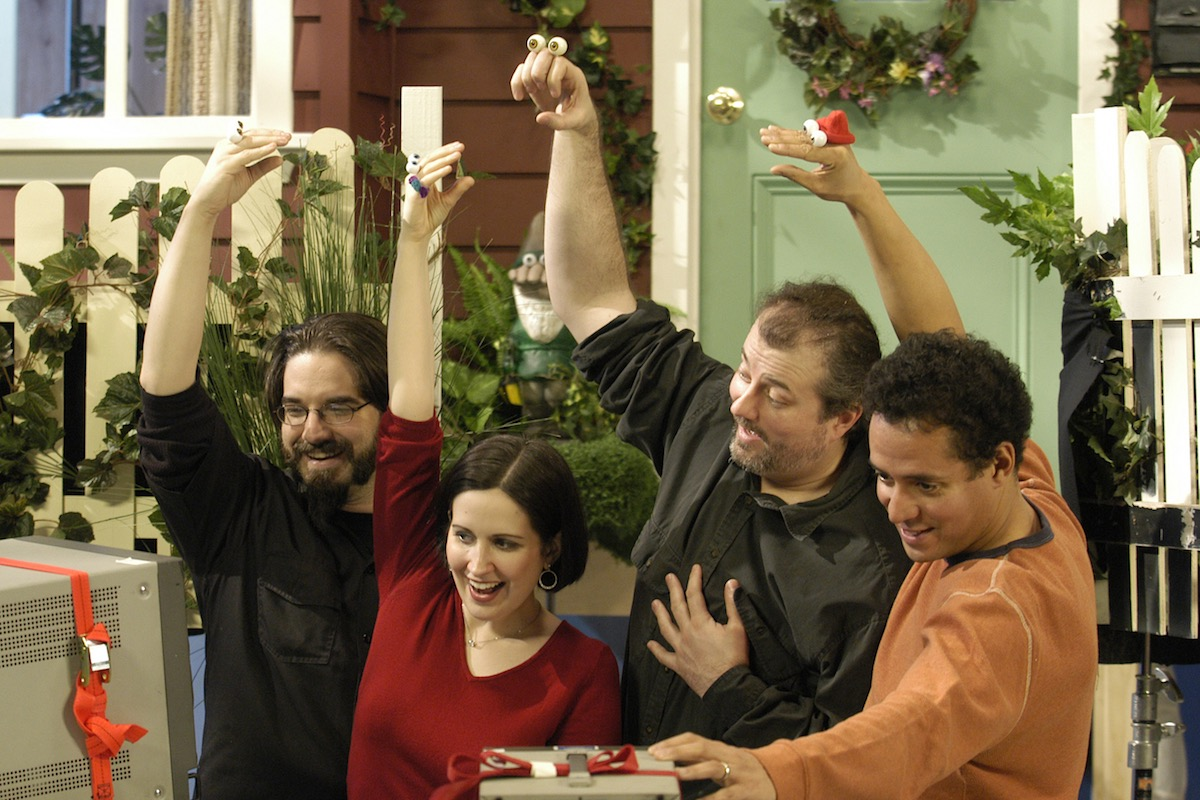
The main cast, from left to right: Tim Lagasse, Stephanie D'Abruzzo, Tyler Bunch, and Noel MacNeal

- Oobi (Tim Lagasse) is a 4-year-old boy who is very curious and always excited to learn something new. Unlike the other characters, he is a completely bare puppet aside from his eyes and wears no accessories or clothes, except on special occasions. Oobi dreams of becoming a piano player when he grows up, and takes piano lessons from an old woman named Inka. He is very protective of his favorite toy, a red model car. He acts as a role model to his little sister, Uma.
- Uma (Stephanie D'Abruzzo) is Oobi's 3-year-old younger sister. She is shorter than Oobi and loves singing, dancing, and pretending. Chickens are her favorite animal, and she likes to talk about and imitate them, which sometimes annoys Grampu. She has a habit of overreacting a lot to small changes or problems. Her catchphrases are "Nice!" and "Pretty." Because she is so young, she has trouble pronouncing long words.
- Kako (Noel MacNeal) is Oobi's excitable, confident, and sometimes arrogant best friend and next-door neighbor. Kako has a very playful attitude and likes to make lots of jokes, but he can prove to be quite insightful and sincere whenever Oobi needs advice. His catchphrase is "¡Perfecto!", the Spanish word for "perfect". Kako lives with his parents, Mamu and Papu.
- Grampu (Tyler Bunch) is Oobi and Uma's very wise and sometimes rather unlucky grandfather who is their caregiver and mentor. His appearance is different from that of the kids; four of his fingers are curled instead of being extended, making him look taller and possibly signifying his age. His favorite pastimes are cooking and gardening. He develops a very romantic relationship with Oobi's piano teacher, Inka, throughout the series. His catchphrase is "Lovely!"

=== Recurring ===
- Inka (Stephanie D'Abruzzo) is Oobi's Eastern European-accented piano teacher and Grampu's girlfriend. She often takes Grampu on dates and flirts with him a lot when she visits Oobi's house. She has visited Paris and likes to try many different foreign foods.
- Angus (Matt Vogel) is a high-strung friend of Oobi's whose eyes are strangely under his fingers rather than on top. He talks in a nasal voice and usually worries a lot about how he looks in front of others. Amusingly, he is a very good actor and has a talent for singing, but he gets lots of stage fright when he has to perform in front of an audience.
- Mrs. Johnson (Jennifer Barnhart) is Oobi's elderly neighbor and one of the few left-handed characters on the show. She has a pet cat named Kitty who likes to climb up trees.
- Mamu and Papu (Frankie Cordero) are Kako's parents, who appear whenever Oobi visits Kako's house. Papu is a homemaker and a cook. Mamu works at an office and is usually away from home, but she still finds time to spend with her family.
- Maestru (James Godwin) is Oobi and Kako's singing teacher who works at the local community center. He is also in charge of the town events. His index finger is always extended and he uses it as a conducting baton.
- Frieda (Cheryl Blaylock) is an upside-down foot puppet. Oobi and Frieda like to play with each other a lot at the park and teach each other how to play different games. She represents a person of a different race or culture from the hand puppets.
- Moppie (Heather Asch) is Uma's best friend from preschool. She is very high-spirited and energetic, but also afraid to try new things. She is an artist and likes to draw portraits of her classmates.
- Bella (Lisa Buckley) is an Italian-accented grocery store owner and one of Grampu's close friends. She brings fruit wherever she goes.

== Production ==
=== Concept and creation ===
Oobi was made by Little Airplane Productions, a studio co-founded by Josh Selig and Lori Shaer. Both co-founders started their careers working on Sesame Street. Selig was inspired to create Oobi after watching puppeteers perform with their bare hands on the set of Sesame Street. Each puppeteer used their hand and a pair of ping pong balls instead of a full puppet. This is a common technique among puppeteers in training, as it helps them learn the basics of lip-syncing and focusing the eyes of a puppet. Selig noted that the more skilled actors could convey lots of emotions with their hands, and it gave him the idea for a series that showcased the "raw emotion" of bare-handed puppetry.

In 1999, MTV Networks and Sesame Workshop created a cable channel called Noggin. At first, the Noggin channel mainly showed reruns from Sesame Workshop's library, so both companies started to look for pitches for new shows. Josh Selig pitched Oobi to them under the working title Pipo, which he wanted to name the main character. He decided to rename the show Oobi after he found out that "Pipo" was already trademarked by an Italian brand of jeans. The new name was meant to mirror the characters' eyeballs with two O's.

The pitch was successful, and Oobi entered production. For the first season, Noggin ordered a collection of 48 shorts, which lasted 1 to 2 minutes each and would play during commercial breaks. Josh Selig said, "I set up a shop to produce that series. So we just signed a one-year lease, it was really an experiment for us... and after the first year we found that we loved having a company." The first season of shorts was filmed in 1999 and started airing in 2000 on Noggin.

=== Assembling the crew ===
Tim Lagasse was chosen to play Oobi because of his previous bare-handed puppetry in A Show of Hands, a series of short films he made in the early 1990s. The show's main cast and crew members were all Sesame Workshop alumni. Kevin Clash, best known for being the original performer of Elmo, was an ensemble puppeteer on Oobi and guest-starred as Randy in the episode, "Babysitter!". Matt Vogel, the current puppeteer for Kermit the Frog and Big Bird, played Oobi's friend Angus. Martin Robinson, who plays Telly Monster on Sesame Street, built the puppets' glass eyes and accessories on Oobi. Lisa Simon, who won 20 Daytime Emmys for her work as a director of Sesame Street, was the producer for Oobi. The show's background music was created by Sacred Noise, a music production company in New York. Additional music was composed by pianist Marianna Rosett and Christopher North Renquist. A few other composers were brought onto the crew for special songs. Jared Faber wrote the theme song. Broadway orchestrator Larry Hochman wrote songs for the "Theater!" episode, which was a ten-minute musical.

=== Filming ===
Oobi was filmed at Kaufman Astoria Studios in New York. The show's set pieces were built on tall wooden poles, positioned to be level with the puppeteers' hands when they raised their arms. This kept the actors' heads out of the camera frame and allowed them to walk normally while performing, making their puppets' movements as smooth as possible. Television monitors were placed below the sets so that the puppeteers could watch their motions and position their characters according to each scene. The actors wore hands-free headsets that recorded their dialogue, making them able to perform and voice their characters at the same time. They sometimes dubbed over their lines in post-production, specifically for the song sequences in episodes like "Theater!", which required them to record different takes to match their voices to the music tracks.

Many of the show's sets were made to evoke the look of old-fashioned home environments. To simulate natural window light in the studio, the crew of Oobi placed shades with foliage patterns over their studio lights; this gave the appearance of sunlight passing through trees. Green screens were used for the sky of the outdoor sets and for the windows of Oobi's house.

Every week during production, the puppeteers visited a local manicurist to get their fingernails touched up. Most of the male puppeteers, such as Tim Lagasse, also had to shave their arms regularly if they played younger characters; Josh Selig said in a 2004 interview that Lagasse had to shave often so that Oobi would not "look like a hairy kid." Tyler Bunch was told specifically not to shave because his natural arm hair gave Grampu the appearance of an elderly, hairy grandfather.

When Cheryl Blaylock was offered the role of Frieda the Foot, she had to revisit puppeteer training techniques to learn to use her foot as a puppet. She recounted in a 2012 interview: "I had to actually go back to Puppetry 101 to train my foot to lip sync. Oh yes, I was determined to do some kind of toe wiggle that could be convincing." For episodes with Frieda, the crew had to construct a new set that allowed Blaylock to raise her foot alongside the hand puppets. To do this, they assembled a ramp-like stage with a chair connected to it, resting on its side. Blaylock was able to lie down in the chair and rest her leg on the ramp, making her foot appear to be standing at the same height as Oobi.

=== Iranian adaptation ===
In May 2012, the Iranian cable channel IRIB TV2 produced its own adaptation of the show, called Oobi: Dasdasi. None of the original crew members were involved. Amir Soltan Ahmadi and Negar Estakhr, two of Iran's foremost puppeteers, directed and starred in the program. In an interview with the newspaper Jaam-e Jam, Estakhr said that she watched episodes of Oobi in English and wanted to make a tailored version for an Iranian audience. Like the original show, it features brother and sister hand puppets who live with their grandfather, but the cast was expanded to include two parents. The three adult characters wore Arab garments.

78 eight-minute episodes were made. They aired from September 22 to December 20, 2012. In July 2013, Oobi: Dasdasi was sold to broadcasters in five countries: Kuwait, Malaysia, Thailand, Indonesia, and Sri Lanka. IRIB TV2 aired the show in Iran and NHK aired a subtitled version in Japan. IRIB's Art News Agency hosts full episodes of Oobi: Dasdasi on its website.

== Broadcast ==
=== Episodes ===
48 shorts and 52 long-form episodes were made across three seasons. Each short is 1–2 minutes long, and the long-form episodes are 10–13 minutes each. The long-form episodes were usually shown in pairs.

=== Airing history ===
In the United States, Oobi was mostly shown on Noggin. In April 2002, the first season of shorts was also shown during commercial breaks on Nickelodeon's Nick Jr. block. Four episodes of the second season were simulcast on both Noggin and Nickelodeon on April 7, 2003.

The show was on Noggin's on-demand service from 2004 to 2009. Reruns of Oobi were shown on the Nick Jr. channel from September 28, 2009 until March 18, 2013. From May 2015 to March 2020, the show was available on the Noggin streaming app. From 2021 to 2024, the series was available on Paramount+.

By the end of its run in 2005, Oobi was aired in over 23 international markets. In Canada, TVOntario aired the first season of shorts. It carried the show from September 1, 2003 to September 2, 2006. On December 5, 2004, the series started airing on AFN Prime, a channel operated by the U.S. Armed Forces that is available worldwide. It was shown on the channel every Sunday until April 3, 2005. The Australian channel ABC Kids ran premieres of the show from February 8 to March 15, 2005, with reruns until February 2, 2007. Oobi aired on Kids Central in Singapore in 2007. Nickelodeon Philippines aired Oobi from 2011 to 2012. The show was also shown in Tonga. Oobi has been one of Nickelodeon Pakistan's flagship series since 2009; as of 2023, it continues to air on the channel once a day.

The show has been dubbed in different languages. From 2005 to 2006, an Icelandic-dubbed version of Oobi aired on Stöð 2. In China, a Mandarin Chinese dub aired on HaHa Nick from May 1 to August 5, 2005. In Israel, a Hebrew dub was made with Gilad Kleter and Yoram Yosefsberg as the voices of Oobi and Grampu. It aired on Nickelodeon Israel and BabyTV from 2008 to 2013. In France and Wallonia, a French dub aired on Nickelodeon France and Nickelodeon Junior from 2005 to 2012. In June 2010, the episode "Make Music!" was featured in Nickelodeon France's Fête de la Musique event. A Polish dub called Rączusie aired on Nickelodeon Poland from July 19, 2009 to February 28, 2010. Nickelodeon Arabia, which broadcasts to the Middle East and North Africa, aired an Arabic dub from 2009 to 2011. Oobi was not part of Nickelodeon Asia's main lineup, but the channel's website featured games of the show until 2016.

== Reception ==
=== Ratings ===
Oobi had high ratings for the Noggin channel. In 2004, Noggin reported that three shows—Oobi, Miffy and Friends, and Connie the Cow—increased the channel's daily viewership by 55 percent over the year before. The average number of viewers watching Oobi increased by 43 percent during the same time. Noggin also reported that Oobi had grown in ratings in each quarter of 2004: +8% from first to second, +22% from second to third, and +10% from third to fourth. The steady increase in ratings was reported by Multichannel News author Mike Reynolds, who attributed Noggin's popularity to its "breakout original series Oobi." The show's growing audience led Noggin to order a third season. The premiere of the "Uma Preschool!" episode on September 6, 2004, posted a 2.35 Nielsen rating among the preschool age group, becoming the highest-rated premiere of a Noggin show to that date. In December 2004, Noggin published a press release with the subtitle: "Noggin's Oobi Delivers Highest Rated Original Premiere In Network's History."

=== Critical reception ===
The strangest [Noggin] show, hands down (pun intended), is Oobi, whose surprisingly appealing puppet characters are bare human hands with goggle-eyes, accessories and homey little indoor and outdoor sets.

— Lynne Heffley, The Los Angeles Times

The puppeteers' performances and the show's style have been praised by critics. Common Sense Media reviewer Andrea Graham gave the show a five-star review, writing that "when it comes to preschool programming, Oobi really breaks the mold, succeeding in its simplicity." Jeanne Spreier of the Dallas Morning News called Oobi "the most imaginative and interesting preschooler program to debut in years," describing its characters as "amazingly expressive hands that show anger, fear, happiness, even age and youth." The Coalition for Quality Children's Media wrote positively of Oobi, complimenting its concept, and calling it "thoroughly enjoyable" and "extremely well received." Diana Dawson of the Herald-Journal liked the show's old-fashioned look, stating that "in a world that too often forgets the innocent joy of playing kick-the-can and catching fireflies, there's something incredibly endearing about the bare-handed puppetry." DVD Talk's Holly Ordway called Oobi "a clever way to encourage kids to be imaginative." Jaime Egan of Families.com commended the show's messages of inclusion and diversity, calling them "invaluable" and highlighting Frieda and Kako as stand-out characters. Ryan Ball of Animation Magazine called the show "an offbeat new entry" to Noggin's lineup, adding that "the fact that all the characters are played by hands just adds to the quirkiness." In 2010, Babble.com listed Oobi second on their list of top twelve television series for young children. In 2018, writer Jon Weisman named Oobi one of the best kids' shows of the 2000s, calling it "low-key charming" and praising the theme song.

Some critics have commended the show for its widespread appeal. In an interview with The New York Times, Tom Ascheim said that "the show's quirky appeal extended far beyond Noggin's target audience. 'The simplicity is really understandable by my two-year-old, but my ten-year-old really giggles at Oobi.'" Andrew Dalton of The Stir said that he was a fan of the show himself, adding that Oobi is "just happy to be simple and gleeful, and that actually makes it more appealing to sit and watch as a grown-up." The San Diego Union-Tribune's Jane Clifford felt that it could be enjoyed by viewers of all ages, remarking that "if as a kid you ever drew eyes or a mouth on your hand and then 'talked' to a friend, you'll relate to this show." The Arkansas Democrat-Gazette named Oobi the best cable premiere of April 2003, reporting: "I've seen every blessed minute of each general-audience premiere; they are good. But another new show outreaches the rest: Oobi." In a 2018 interview, Noel MacNeal recounted, "Some of our biggest fans became [college] kids coming back from parties, who were just like really stoned, and would just sit and watch Oobi."

=== Awards and nominations ===
In spring 2001, Oobi won a Parents' Choice Gold Award. Later in the same year, the show had two nominations from the Coalition for Quality Children's Media, winning one of them. In 2004, the show won a second Parents' Choice Award, and a nomination in the "Up to 6 Fiction" category at the Prix Jeunesse International Festival. In 2007, Common Sense Media named the show on its annual list of "Best Bets for Young Kids." In June 2009, Josh Selig won an Innovation Award from the Television Academy for his work on the show. In 2014, Prix Jeunesse named Oobi in its category "The Greatest Impact Programmes of the Last 50 Years."

Year	Presenter	Award/Category	Nominee	Status	Ref.
2001	Parents' Choice Foundation	Television Gold Award	Little Airplane Productions	Won	
2001	Coalition for Quality Children's Media	Kids First Endorsement Award	Little Airplane Productions	Won	
2001	Coalition for Quality Children's Media	Best Children's Film or Video	Little Airplane Productions	Nominated	
2004	Parents' Choice Foundation	Television Silver Honor	Little Airplane Productions	Won	
2004	Prix Jeunesse International	Up to 6 Fiction	Little Airplane Productions	Nominated	
2007	Common Sense Media	Best Bet for Young Kids 2-4	Little Airplane Productions	Won	
2009	Academy of Television Arts & Sciences Foundation	Innovation Award	Josh Selig	Won	
2014	Prix Jeunesse International	Greatest Impact Programme of the Last 50 Years: 2004	Little Airplane Productions	Won	

=== Cultural impact ===
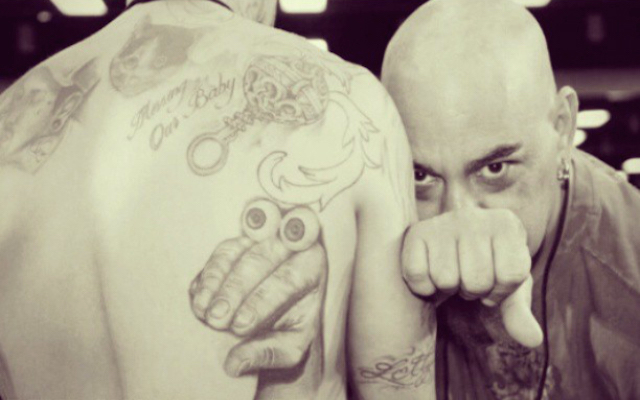
Artist Jesse Hernandez with an Oobi tattoo in Longview, Texas

Oobi has made an impression on celebrities. Actress Uma Thurman, who shares her first name with the character Uma, revealed to Stephanie D'Abruzzo (who plays Uma) that she was familiar with the show and its characters in 2004. Also in 2007, two clips from the Oobi episodes "Showtime!" and "Uma Bathroom!" were shown on Joel McHale's talk show The Soup during the segment "What the Kids Are Watching", where McHale took scenes from children's shows out of context.

During its run, the show developed a cult following of puppet fans and amateur filmmakers who created their own Oobi puppets. In 2003, the Boston Herald said that Oobi was "already very popular" with "those of the Muppet generation." In the same article, Tom Ascheim stated that Oobi "gets fan mail," and he guessed that the show was catching on because viewers could easily make their own Oobi puppets with their hands. In 2004, The Melbourne Age reported that "the show - the work of various Sesame Street alumni - is developing a strong cult following; the real Uma [Thurman] is said to be a fan of hand Uma." From 2006 to 2013, an online shop called OobiEyes.com sold handmade Oobi puppets and accessories. OobiEyes.com held an advertising campaign with YouTube in 2008, which inspired a community of early YouTubers to make videos with their own Oobi-style puppets.

External videos
- "Dog Problems" Official Music Video, December 1, 2006, Nettwerk Music

In November 2006, indie rock band The Format released a music video for their song "Dog Problems" which was inspired by Oobi. It featured hand puppets in the style of the show. In 2009, an advertising contest called the Cannes Young Lions Competition included an Oxfam commercial based on Oobi. Titled "Let Your Hands Do the Talking," it starred spoofs of celebrities portrayed as hand puppets and given "Oo"-themed names like Oobi and Uma. In January 2014, the condom company Durex made a commercial that starred a parody version of Oobi named Elizabeth. In an interview with La República, the commercial's director said, "Elizabeth is a parody of the television character Oobi, who is also a funny talking hand."

In July 2016, Disney XD made a one-off television pilot called Right Hand Guy, which starred a pre-teen whose right hand becomes a puppet and befriends him. The creator, Dan Lagana, took inspiration from Oobi while developing the pilot. Lagana showed the Oobi episode "Babysitter!" to the actors so that they would be familiar with the hand movements.

The show has been mentioned in books. In his autobiography Alternadad, comedian Neal Pollack talks about Oobi and names Grampu his favorite character. He writes that Oobi "featured a hilarious character called Grampu ... he made funny faces when he had to eat the awful food the kids cooked for him, and he also flirted with Oobi's piano teacher." It is a plot point in Laura Lynn's novel Ariel's Office, where the narrator's daughter watches Noggin and is "transfixed" by Oobi. It is described as a "Noggin show that use[s] Señor Wences-style human hand puppets" in Dade Hayes's novel Anytime Playdate, which studies the preschool TV business. The filmmaker Robert Rodriguez also talks about Oobi in his book The 1950s' Most Wanted. Lisa Guernsey describes Oobi in her 2012 book Screen Time, which reports on how TV affects children.

== Related media ==
=== Video releases and books ===
Clips from Oobi were included as special features on ten Nick Jr. DVDs sold in 2003 and 2004. The first was Blue's Clues: Shapes and Colors!, which featured the "Dance!" short. The last was Oswald: On-the-Go Oswald, which featured a clip from the "Dance Class!" episode. Some of these videos were repackaged and sold in DVD packs from 2004 until 2015.

Oobi has also been featured in TV-related magazines. The August 2004 issue of Nick Jr. Magazine had a craft section about how to make Oobi hand puppets. In August 2004 and April 2005, TV Guide ran interviews with Stephanie D'Abruzzo and Josh Selig about the show. The show is mentioned in the September 2004 issue of Big Apple Parent. The October 2004 issue of Playthings includes another interview with Josh Selig with pictures from behind the scenes of Oobi. Kidscreen included news about the show in July 2005 and in June 2007.

=== Online games ===
In 2001, Noggin's website added a page called "Oobi Online," which had a series of flash games starring Oobi. Noggin staff described the page as a place "where kids can match shapes with bubbles, colors with snacks, compose music, and draw and dance with Oobi." A few of the games were inspired by episodes of the show, while other games had their own unique stories. From 2004 to 2006, Noggin.com also hosted printables of Oobi. Four of the games were imported to NickJr.com in 2009.

=== Live events ===
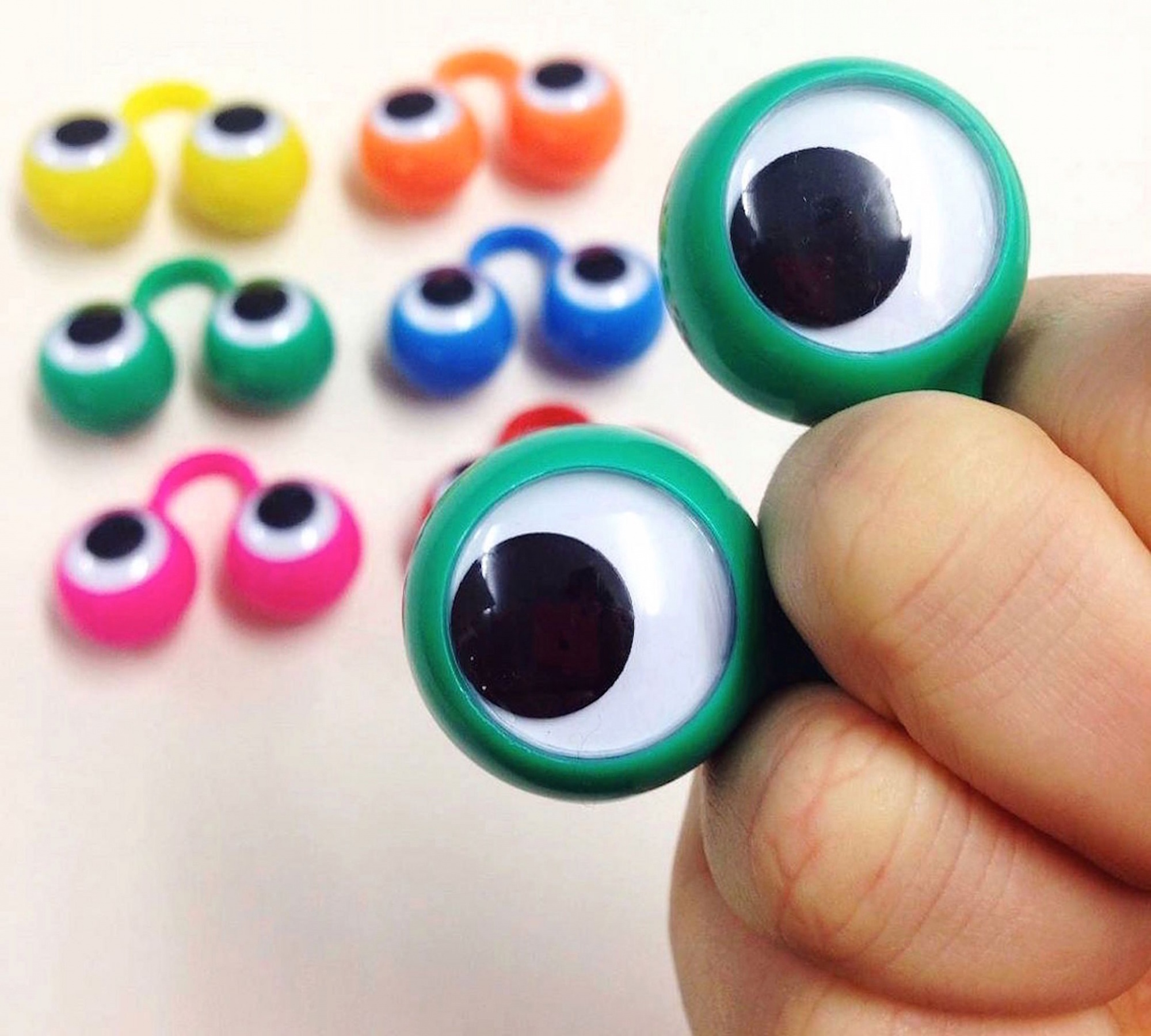
At some events, Noggin gave out plastic puppet eyes to promote the show.

From 2001 to 2007, Noggin held live events to promote the show. The first was an Oobi tour at the 2001 North American Trade Show in Minnesota. The tour featured a replica of the set for Oobi's house. The second event was Club Noggin, a monthly event held at GGP Malls across America in 2004. At Club Noggin, visitors could get Oobi puppet eyes and make crafts based on the show. The third event was the Noggin Auction, an online charity auction hosted on Noggin.com in November 2006. Viewers could bid on props from different Noggin shows, including hats and towels with Oobi on them. The last event was "Oobi Arts and Crafts," held at the Nick Hotel in Florida in November 2007. At these sessions, hotel guests were given plastic puppet eyes like Oobi's.

Episodes of the show were also screened at a few promotions and festivals. In 2001 and 2002, the show was part of the Kids First Film Festival, an annual event held across the United States. From 2002 to 2004, the Jillian's restaurant chain held "Noggin Play Days" where it screened Oobi shorts. In August 2009, three episodes of Oobi were screened by Multikino, a chain of movie theaters across Poland. They were shown as part of a promotion called "Mornings with Nick," which advertised new shows on Nickelodeon's Polish channel.
