= Amir Soltan Ahmadi =

Iranian actor and comedian

- Born: Tehran, Iran
- Education: University of Tehran; B.A. in Theatre
- Occupations: Actor, comedian
- Years active: 1998–present

Amir Soltan Ahmadi (Persian: امیر سلطان‌احمدی) is an Iranian actor and comedian who is one of Iran's foremost puppeteers. He is known for playing Pesar Ammeh Za on Kolah Ghermezi.

== Filmography ==
=== TV series ===
- Kolah Ghermezi - Writer, performer of Pesar Ammeh Za
- Oobi: Dasdasi - Director and performer
- Shutters - Main cast

=== Film ===
- Kolah Ghermezi and Pesar Khaleh - Performer of Pesar Ammeh Za
- The Castle (post-production, 2018) - Voice actor, main cast

=== Theatre ===
- Bahman Koochik and Little Bahman - Main cast

== See also ==
- Iraj Tahmasb
- Hamid Jebelli
