= List of Oobi episodes =

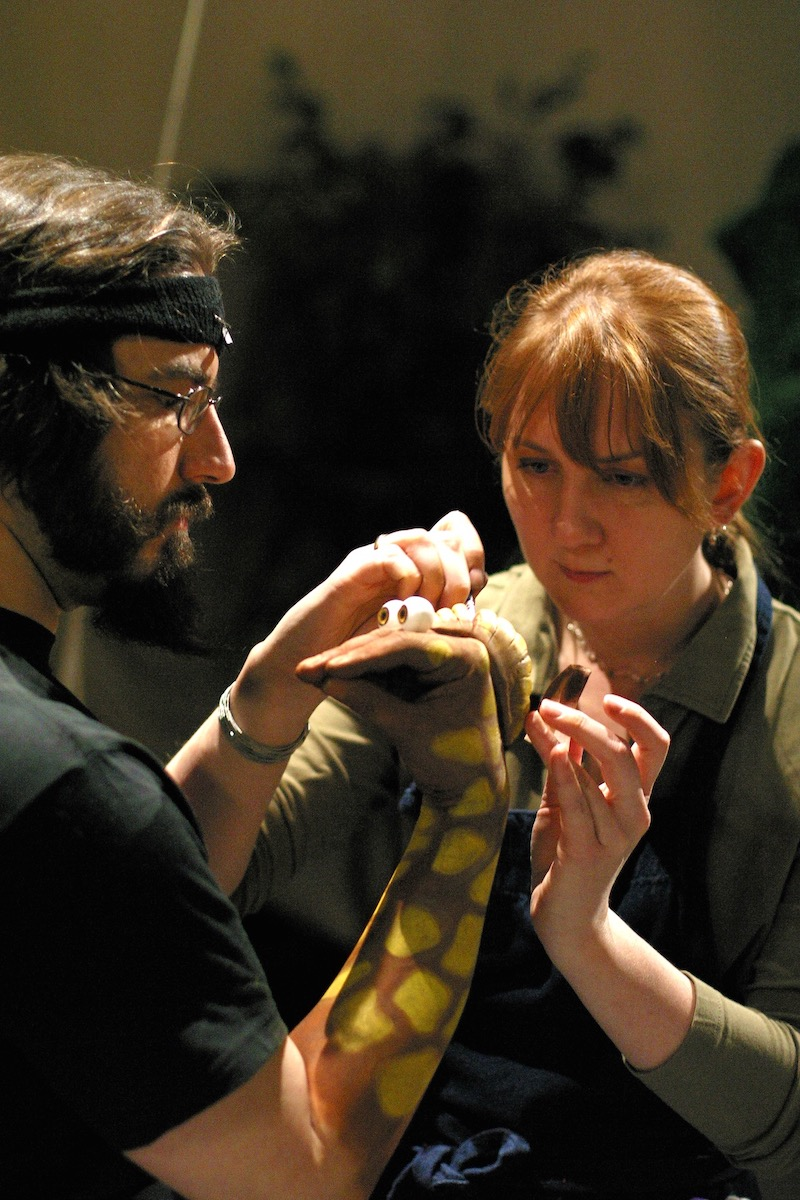
Tim Lagasse and Cathy McCullough on the set of Oobi in 2004

Oobi is an American children's television series produced by Little Airplane Productions. The show's concept is based on a technique used by puppeteers in training, in which they use their hands and a pair of ping pong balls instead of a full puppet. The main characters are bare hand puppets with eyes and accessories, played by Muppet performers. The show aired on the Noggin channel, which was co-founded by MTV Networks and Sesame Workshop.

Oobi has three seasons: one season of shorts and two seasons of long-form episodes. The shorts are 1–2 minutes each and were aired during commercial breaks. The long-form episodes are 10–13 minutes each. The show ran from 2000 to 2005, with reruns continuing until 2013. It ended with 48 shorts and 52 long-form episodes: a total of 100 individual stories. From 2015 to 2020, Oobi was available for streaming through the Noggin streaming app. The show received a variety of awards and nominations, including an Innovation Award from the Television Academy and two accolades from the Parents’ Choice Foundation.

In 2012, a foreign adaptation titled Oobi: Dasdasi premiered and ran for 78 episodes. It was filmed in Iran and produced by the Iranian network IRIB TV2. In July 2013, Oobi: Dasdasi was sold to broadcasters in Southeast Asia and Japan, becoming one of the first Iranian children's shows to air internationally.

== Series overview ==
Season	Episodes	Originally released	
Season	Episodes	First released	Last released
1 (shorts)	48	2000	2001
2	26	April 7, 2003	June 16, 2003
3	26	September 6, 2004	February 11, 2005

== Episodes ==
=== Season 1 (shorts, 2000–01) ===
The first season was a collection of two-minute shorts that were played as interstitials between half-hour shows. 48 shorts have been confirmed. The episodes are listed below in the order used by TVOntario.

No. in season	Title	Directed by	Original release date
1	"Slide!"	Tim Lagasse	2000
Oobi rides down a slide with Uma at the playground.
2	"Follow the Leader!"	Tim Lagasse	2000
Oobi, Uma, and Kako play a game of follow the leader. Oobi is the leader, and Kako copies all of his moves perfectly. However, Uma does them backwards each time. The boys decide to let Uma be the leader so she can make up her own moves.
3	"Pretend Catch!"	Tim Lagasse	2001
Oobi and Kako play a game of catch with an imaginary ball.
4	"Peekaboo!"	Tim Lagasse	2001
Oobi, Uma, and Kako play peekaboo by covering and uncovering each other with their palms. Later, they invite the viewers to join in by covering and uncovering the camera.
5	"Tag!"	Tim Lagasse	2001
Uma feels left out when Oobi and Kako play a game of tag without her. She tries to get their attention, but they are laughing so much that they cannot hear her. She decides to jump into the game herself.
6	"Dance!"	Tim Lagasse	2001
Grampu brings a radio outside, and each of the kids takes a turn dancing along to a different genre of music.
7	"Share Pretzels!"	Tim Lagasse	2001
Oobi shares his store-bought pretzels with Uma and Kako, but they eat them all before Oobi gets a chance to have one. Grampu appreciates Oobi's thoughtfulness and gives him a home-baked pretzel.
8	"Watermelon!"	Tim Lagasse	2001
Uma discovers the taste of watermelon and loves it so much that she tries to eat one whole.
9	"Soup!"	Tim Lagasse	2001
Oobi and Kako make soup for Uma. She thinks the soup is too hot at first, so Oobi and Kako help cool it down. Soon the soup is very cold, but Uma likes it that way.
10	"Hot Dog and Ketchup!"	Tim Lagasse	2001
Oobi wants to put some ketchup on his hot dog, but he has trouble getting it out of the bottle. After Kako helps out, they end up drenching the hot dog in ketchup.
11	"Empty and Full!"	Tim Lagasse	2001
Oobi and Uma show the difference between empty and full by drinking orange juice out of a tiny cup and a huge pitcher.
12	"Popcorn!"	Tim Lagasse	2001
Grampu is making a bowl of popcorn for Oobi and Kako. While they wait, the boys pretend to be popcorn by popping up and down.
13	"Worm!"	Tim Lagasse	2001
Uma finds a worm in the garden. Kako shows her that it is safe to touch it.
14	"Apple Picking!"	Tim Lagasse	2001
At the local orchard, Oobi and Kako stack on top of each other to help Uma reach a perfect apple. As soon as Uma picks the apple, they lose their balance and fall down.
15	"Pretend Wind!"	Tim Lagasse	2001
Oobi and Kako are outside on a windy day. They pretend to be the wind by blowing on each other.
16	"Dig!"	Tim Lagasse	2001
Oobi and Uma dig in the garden.
17	"Hide and Seek!"	Tim Lagasse	2001
Oobi hides behind a sunflower during a game of hide and seek.
18	"Nature!"	Tim Lagasse	2001
Grampu tries to explain what nature is.
19	"Music!"	Tim Lagasse	2001
Oobi and Kako make music by turning a soup can and a bottle into makeshift instruments. Uma joins in by singing along to their rhythm.
20	"Guitar!"	Tim Lagasse	2001
Oobi and Kako have trouble trying to play an acoustic guitar separately. They discover that they need to work as a team to play a tune on it.
21	"Bongo Drums!"	Tim Lagasse	2001
Grampu plays a beat on a pair of bongo drums. Uma wants to play along, but she has trouble matching Grampu's rhythm.
22	"Quiet Read!"	Tim Lagasse	2001
Oobi tries to read a book in peace but is interrupted by Uma, who is listening to loud music. He finds a compromise by giving Uma a pair of headphones.
23	"Clap Hands!"	Tim Lagasse	2001
Uma wants to join when Oobi and Kako pass time by clapping their palms together.
24	"Painting!"	Tim Lagasse	2001
Uma poses for Oobi while he uses finger paints to draw a portrait of her.
25	"Macaroni Jewelry!"	Tim Lagasse	2001
Oobi, Uma, and Kako put on a fashion show with jewelry made from macaroni. Their performance is cut short when Grampu calls them to the kitchen, where he has made bowls of mac and cheese for them.
26	"Paint Shapes!"	Tim Lagasse	2001
Oobi and Kako use sponges to paint different shapes.
27	"Pinch Pot!"	Tim Lagasse	2001
Oobi and Uma make a pinch pot out of clay.
28	"Drawing Game!"	Tim Lagasse	2001
Grampu plays a charades-style drawing game with Oobi. He draws a rabbit and asks Oobi to guess what it is.
29	"Neighborhood Art!"	Tim Lagasse	2001
Oobi makes a model of a neighborhood out of cardboard boxes and paint. He gives Uma a tour of the different buildings, and he helps her sound out the words "library" and "neighborhood."
30	"Toothpaste!"	Tim Lagasse	2001
Oobi and Kako try to open a tube of toothpaste. Just as Oobi realizes the cap is still screwed on, Kako decides to jump on top of it, covering Oobi in toothpaste.
31	"Wet and Dry!"	Tim Lagasse	2001
Grampu uses a big blue towel to dry Uma after her bath. After jumping in and out of the bathtub a few times, Uma decides to splash Grampu and then dries him off.
32	"Bubble Bath!"	Tim Lagasse	2001
Oobi and Kako take a bubble bath. They use bubbles to pretend to be different creatures.
33	"Feelings!"	Tim Lagasse	2001
Oobi plays a game by acting out emotions and inviting the viewers to join him. Uma imitates Oobi's moves behind his back. After the game, she decides to act out the feeling of surprise by jumping and scaring Oobi.
34	"Cake!"	Tim Lagasse	2001
After playing outside in the mud, Oobi and Kako run inside and spot a cake on the counter. Before they can eat it, Grampu tells them to wash up in the sink, so they work together to wash their hands.
35	"Flush!"	Tim Lagasse	2001
Uma thinks the sound of a toilet flushing is hilarious, so she wants to hear it flush over and over again. When Grampu asks her to stop, they play a game where they imitate a flush by moving their thumbs up and down.
36	"On and Off!"	Tim Lagasse	2001
Oobi and Kako play with a water sprinkler in the backyard. When it keeps turning on and off, they try to figure out why it won't run normally. They find out that Uma has been spinning the faucet handle like a race car, messing with the water unintentionally.
37	"Prince Oobi!"	Tim Lagasse	2001
Uma builds a sand castle. She names Grampu the king of the castle, then names Oobi the prince. When they ask her if she wants to be a queen or a princess, she says she would rather just be a builder.
38	"Bubbles!"	Tim Lagasse	2001
Oobi and Uma use a bubble wand to blow bubbles outside. They let Kako have a turn, but instead of blowing bubbles, he tries to take a bath in their bubble soap.
39	"Tea!"	Tim Lagasse	2001
Oobi and Uma want to have a tea party, but they forget to bring out their teapot. Determined not to let their day go to waste, they decide to sing the song "I'm a Little Teapot".
40	"Ice Cream!"	Tim Lagasse	2001
Oobi and Uma eat ice cream.
41	"Water Games!"	Tim Lagasse	2001
Oobi and Kako play pretend at a big red pool.
42	"Guess!"	Tim Lagasse	2001
Oobi and Kako play a guessing game. Oobi hides a turtle in a terrarium, then asks Kako to guess what is inside. He gives a few clues: legs, green, tail, and shell. Kako makes a few incorrect guesses but realizes that it has to be a turtle. Oobi uncovers the turtle and they play with it.
43	"Bird!"	Tim Lagasse	2001
Uma tries to get a canary to sing with her.
44	"Cat!"	Tim Lagasse	2001
Oobi and Kako take turns using a feather to play with a cat. Grampu asks for a turn and acts like a cat trying to grab the feather.
45	"Puppy!"	Tim Lagasse	2001
Oobi pretends to be a puppy, smelling a flower.
46	"Animal Cookies!"	Tim Lagasse	2001
Kako brings Oobi a box of animal cookies. They look at the different shapes and imitate the animals they see. When Kako mimics a pig, he oinks and eats all of the cookies, leaving none for Oobi.
47	"Itsy Bitsy Spider!"	Tim Lagasse	2001
Kako pretends to be a spider and gives Oobi the idea to sing the song "The Itsy Bitsy Spider".
48	"Toys!"	Tim Lagasse	2001
Uma tries to have fun with her stuffed rabbit, but she is bored. Oobi cheers her up by chasing her rabbit with his toy lizard.

=== Season 2 (2003) ===
For the show's second season, it became a long-form series with each episode lasting around 13 minutes. A total 26 long-form episodes were filmed for this season from January to February 2003. The first two episodes ("Camp Out!" and "Uma Swing!") premiered on April 7, 2003. The episodes are ordered below according to the Noggin streaming service.

No. in season	Title	Directed by (Note: Information is taken from the ending credits. The same three directors—Selig, Arciero, and Lombard—are credited for every episode of season two. The team of directors changed in season three, with Selig remaining and Scott Preston replacing the others.)	Original release date
1	"Camp Out!"	Josh Selig, Pam Arciero, and Kevin Lombard	April 7, 2003
Grampu and the kids camp out in the backyard. They eat marshmallows, tell a ghost story, and prepare their own sleeping bags. Oobi tries to have fun but is afraid of the dark and the sounds of the night. Grampu helps him overcome his fears by showing Oobi that the sounds are just everyday things: a cat, an owl, and a creaky door.
2	"Uma Swing!"	Josh Selig, Pam Arciero, and Kevin Lombard	April 7, 2003
Oobi helps Uma regain her confidence after she falls off of the swing at the playground. After he shows her how to be careful on the other rides, Uma decides to try the swing again. She is soon swinging all by herself with Kako and Grampu cheering her on.
3	"Uma Bathroom!"	Josh Selig, Pam Arciero, and Kevin Lombard	April 7, 2003
Uma refuses to take a bath after playing in the mud with Oobi and Kako. Grampu chases her through the house and tries to convince her to wash up. Uma eventually climbs into the bathtub and has fun by singing a song about bathtime. Grampu is relieved that Uma is clean, but he is less than thrilled to clean up the dirty bathroom. Note: A scene from this episode appears in a 2007 installment of Joel McHale's The Soup.
4	"Dance Class!"	Josh Selig, Pam Arciero, and Kevin Lombard	April 7, 2003
Oobi and Uma sign up for dance lessons. Their instructor, Tulla, teaches them the importance of practicing. After they master a synchronized dance routine, Tulla throws a disco dance party for them. Grampu feels the beat and joins in.
5	"Kako's Puppy!"	Josh Selig, Pam Arciero, and Kevin Lombard	April 10, 2003
Oobi is excited when Kako asks him to watch his puppy while he's out. Grampu helps Oobi realize that pets are a big responsibility and need to be walked, fed, and washed. After learning how to take care of dogs, Oobi finally gets to play with the puppy.
6	"Uma's Birthday!"	Josh Selig, Pam Arciero, and Kevin Lombard	April 10, 2003
Oobi, Kako, and Grampu throw Uma a big surprise party for her birthday. They play games, give her presents, and dance in a conga line. After a while, Uma feels overwhelmed when the party becomes more about the games and less about her. She retreats to her room, and Oobi learns that she would prefer a small party. The others decide to give her one by bringing in one small gift and a tiny birthday cupcake.
7	"Asparagus!"	Josh Selig, Pam Arciero, and Kevin Lombard	April 14, 2003
Oobi and Grampu try to get Uma to try asparagus. After their attempts fail, Oobi is able to trick her into tasting it, and she ends up loving it.
8	"Haircut!"	Josh Selig, Pam Arciero, and Kevin Lombard	April 14, 2003
Oobi wakes up with a wild patch of hair on his head. He tries hiding and styling it, but nothing satisfies him. In the end, he and Grampu go to the barbershop. Oobi is able to overcome his fear of getting a haircut and happily returns to his old hairless self.
9	"Grampu Day!"	Josh Selig, Pam Arciero, and Kevin Lombard	April 18, 2003
The kids create their own holiday to celebrate Grampu and each give him a gift. Oobi makes a statue of Grampu out of clay, Kako makes food, and Uma sings a short song. The statue looks nothing like Grampu and the food is disgusting, but Grampu has a great time and enjoys Uma's song.
10	"Make Pizza!"	Josh Selig, Pam Arciero, and Kevin Lombard	April 18, 2003
The kids are a little too eager to help Grampu make pizza, and end up doing everything the wrong way. They throw the dough on top of Grampu and smash tomatoes instead of using tomato sauce. Luckily, the pizza turns out okay, but they forget to leave a slice for Grampu. They then make him another to make it up to him.
11	"Showtime!"	Josh Selig, Pam Arciero, and Kevin Lombard	April 21, 2003
Uma wants to be a part of Oobi and Kako's puppet show. They let her help make the costumes, but when she accidentally glues the boys and their props together, they insist that she should just watch. They soon regret their decision when they find out that they need Uma's help to open the curtain when their costumes prevent them from opening it themselves. Oobi asks her to come back, and she becomes a star of the show. Note: A scene from this episode appears in a 2007 installment of Joel McHale's The Soup.
12	"Oobi's Car!"	Josh Selig, Pam Arciero, and Kevin Lombard	April 21, 2003
Oobi reluctantly lets Uma play with his favorite model car while he helps Grampu with the sink. When she accidentally breaks one of the wheels off, she tries to repair it herself and ends up damaging more of it with each touch. Oobi gets mad. Grampu explains that accidents can sometimes happen and fixes the car with the kids' help.
13	"Garden Day!"	Josh Selig, Pam Arciero, and Kevin Lombard	April 28, 2003
Grampu introduces the kids to his favorite pastime, gardening. He teaches them how flowers grow and gives them a seed to plant. They find it boring waiting for their plant to grow, but their patience pays off when it becomes a small sprout.
14	"Piano Lesson!"	Josh Selig, Pam Arciero, and Kevin Lombard	April 28, 2003
Grampu falls in love with Oobi's piano teacher, Inka, when she comes to visit. She teaches Oobi how to play a scale and even lets Grampu show off his piano skills.
15	"Uma Chicken!"	Josh Selig, Pam Arciero, and Kevin Lombard	May 5, 2003
Uma takes Oobi and Kako's farm animal game too far and won't stop pretending that she is a chicken. She wears a chicken costume, pecks at her food, and tries to lay an egg. However, when she meets an actual chicken, she decides that it is more fun to be herself.
16	"Sleepover!"	Josh Selig, Pam Arciero, and Kevin Lombard	May 5, 2003
Kako invites Oobi to a sleepover. Uma misses Oobi terribly and is disappointed that she wasn't invited. Grampu does his best to make Uma feel better, but the only thing that works is a phone call and a lullaby from Oobi.
17	"Play Ball!"	Josh Selig, Pam Arciero, and Kevin Lombard	May 12, 2003
Kako becomes frustrated with tee-ball and refuses to play. After Oobi learns the basics of Kako's hand-clapping game, Oobi teaches Kako the fundamentals of tee-ball. Kako gets a hit and Uma is revealed to be a tee-ball natural.
18	"Build Fort!"	Josh Selig, Pam Arciero, and Kevin Lombard	May 12, 2003
Oobi and Kako build forts out of blocks and get into a heated argument over whose is better. They try to one-up each other by bribing Uma, Grampu, and even the viewers to join their respective forts. They eventually make up and combine their forts after agreeing that arguments are no fun.
19	"Petting Zoo!"	Josh Selig, Pam Arciero, and Kevin Lombard	May 19, 2003
Grampu takes Oobi and Kako to the petting zoo. The boys are afraid of the horse at first, but they overcome their fear after joining Grampu for a horseback ride and pretending to be cowboys.
20	"New Friend!"	Josh Selig, Pam Arciero, and Kevin Lombard	May 19, 2003
A day at the park with Grampu becomes special for Oobi when he meets Frieda, a friendly foot puppet. Oobi learns that diversity is good and that new friends come in many shapes and sizes.
21	"Uma Sick"	Josh Selig, Pam Arciero, and Kevin Lombard	May 26, 2003
Oobi and Kako try to make Uma feel better when she comes down with a fever. They make her a card filled with things she likes and perform a "get-better" dance, but what she really needs is some rest. They decide to sing her a lullaby, and Uma is healthy again after getting some sleep.
22	"Playdate!"	Josh Selig, Pam Arciero, and Kevin Lombard	May 26, 2003
Kako gets jealous when Oobi becomes obsessed with his new pet turtle and forgets about a playdate they planned. Oobi makes every game about the turtle. Oobi realizes how upset Kako is and makes amends with him.
23	"Make Art!"	Josh Selig, Pam Arciero, and Kevin Lombard	June 9, 2003
The kids decide to make art together after seeing Grampu's painting. Kako paints a colorful pattern, Uma creates a circle-themed piece, and Oobi makes a collage.
24	"Rainy Day!"	Josh Selig, Pam Arciero, and Kevin Lombard	June 9, 2003
After the rain spoils their plans, Oobi and Kako reluctantly join Uma to find a rainbow. They cheer up after catching raindrops and splashing in puddles before finally finding a rainbow.
25	"Pretend Circus!"	Josh Selig, Pam Arciero, and Kevin Lombard	June 16, 2003
Oobi, Uma, and Kako are disappointed when they cannot visit the circus because it is too far away. They decide to use their imaginations to create their own pretend circus.
26	"Make Music!"	Josh Selig, Pam Arciero, and Kevin Lombard	June 16, 2003
The kids form their own band and try to find makeshift instruments. Kako blows into a bottle, Uma bangs on a pot, and Oobi claps with Grampu.

=== Season 3 (2004–05) ===
The show's third and last season was filmed from January to February 2004. Like the second season, it contains 26 episodes. The season premiered on September 6, 2004. The episodes are ordered below according to the Noggin streaming service.

No. in season	Title	Directed by	Original release date
1	"Video!"	Josh Selig and Scott Preston	September 6, 2004
Oobi and Uma are obsessed with a video and watch it over and over again. Grampu turns the television off and shows them how to film and edit their own home video.
2	"Grown-Up!"	Josh Selig and Scott Preston	September 6, 2004
Oobi and Kako think grown-ups have cool jobs, so they pretend to be grown-up firefighters, musicians, and businesspeople. Uma plays along but eventually convinces them that kids are cooler.
3	"Shopping!"	Josh Selig and Scott Preston	September 7, 2004
Grampu takes Oobi and Kako to Bella's supermarket, where the boys play with the fruit and unintentionally make a mess. Grampu helps them learn to respect other people's property and shows them how to pay for their food.
4	"Uma Dreams!"	Josh Selig and Scott Preston	September 7, 2004
Uma wakes up in the middle of the night after having a nightmare. Grampu helps calm her down and teaches Uma how to turn her nightmare into a silly dream.
5	"Chopsticks!"	Josh Selig and Scott Preston	September 8, 2004
Grampu takes the children to a Chinese restaurant, where Uma learns how to use chopsticks.
6	"Clean Up!"	Josh Selig and Scott Preston	September 8, 2004
Oobi wants to play outside with Uma and Kako, but he has to clean his room first. Uma and Kako sing a song and work together to help him clean up.
7	"Kako Dinner!"	Josh Selig and Scott Preston	September 9, 2004
Oobi learns that trying new things is good when he visits Kako's house for dinner.
8	"Sign Language!"	Josh Selig and Scott Preston	September 9, 2004
Oobi and Kako meet a deaf girl named Amy at the park. Her mother helps them learn American Sign Language so that they can communicate and play together.
9	"Halloween!"	Josh Selig and Scott Preston	October 25, 2004
It is Uma's first time trick-or-treating on Halloween. After Oobi teaches her all of the rituals, Uma takes Kako under her wing and helps him overcome his fear of Halloween.
10	"Checkup!"	Josh Selig and Scott Preston	October 26, 2004
Oobi visits his pediatrician's office for a checkup. He is nervous at first, but the doctor's kindness helps puts Oobi at ease.
11	"Uma Trip!"	Josh Selig and Scott Preston	October 27, 2004
Oobi, Kako, and Grampu take Uma on a pretend trip throughout the house.
12	"Frieda Friend!"	Josh Selig and Scott Preston	October 28, 2004
Frieda invites Oobi to play with her and another foot named Frankie at the park. At first, Oobi does not know how to play with them because they like different games. However, Uma tells him that differences are okay and even points out some things that they have in common.
13	"Neighborhood!"	Josh Selig and Scott Preston	October 29, 2004
Oobi and Kako build a replica of their neighborhood out of boxes and paint. They give Uma a tour and show her the library, the post office, and the zoo.
14	"Uma Preschool!"	Josh Selig and Scott Preston	November 1, 2004
Uma does not want Grampu to leave on her first day of preschool, but ends up having the time of her life when she meets her teacher and some new friends.
15	"Theater!"	Josh Selig and Scott Preston	November 2, 2004
Maestru directs a musical performance of "Little Red Riding Hood", staged in the park. Oobi plays the wolf, Uma plays Little Red, Kako plays the mother and grandmother, and Angus steals the show as the woodsman.
16	"Baby!"	Josh Selig and Scott Preston	November 3, 2004
Oobi meets a baby named Sophie and her mother, Sheila, at the park. Oobi feeds Sophie, changes her diaper, and rocks her to sleep.
17	"Chez Oobi!"	Josh Selig and Scott Preston	February 11, 2005
Grampu prepares a special dinner of spaghetti and meatballs for his date with Inka. Oobi and Kako help by turning the house into an Italian-style restaurant. They turn on soft violin music, act as waiters, and serve fruit tarts for dessert. Note: In the United States, "Chez Oobi!" and Valentine!" were the last episodes to premiere on television. During the original airing, the order of the segments was switched, with "Valentine!" shown first.
18	"Valentine!"	Josh Selig and Scott Preston	February 11, 2005
Oobi and Uma follow a trail of hearts to find their mystery valentine, who turns out to be Grampu in a festive heart costume. Note: In the United States, "Chez Oobi!" and "Valentine!" were the last episodes to premiere on television. During the original airing, the order of the segments was switched, with "Valentine!" shown first.
19	"Parade!"	Josh Selig and Scott Preston	September 14, 2004
The kids put on their own parade after seeing a parade poster. Oobi wears a float costume, Uma becomes a majorette, and Kako dresses as a one-man band.
20	"Babysitter!"	Josh Selig and Scott Preston	September 14, 2004
Grampu and Inka go out polka dancing and leave a playful babysitter named Randy in charge of the kids. Uma initially resents Randy, but his silly demeanor eventually wins her over. Guest star: Kevin Clash as Randy
21	"Recital!"	Josh Selig and Scott Preston	September 6, 2004
Oobi and Angus perform at a piano recital. Oobi is very confident and helps Angus overcome his stage fright. However, when Oobi makes a mistake during his performance, he panics and runs offstage. Kako persuades him to try again, and soon afterwards, Oobi is able to play "Twinkle, Twinkle, Little Star" perfectly.
22	"Dinosaur!"	Josh Selig and Scott Preston	September 6, 2004
Oobi writes a storybook called "The Lost Umasaurus", in which dinosaurs named Oobi-Rex and Dino-Kako help Umasaurus find her way home.
23	"Nature Walk!"	Josh Selig and Scott Preston	September 24, 2004
Grampu takes the kids on a nature walk in the park. The highlight of their trip is seeing an eagle fly through the air.
24	"Sing!"	Josh Selig and Scott Preston	September 24, 2004
Oobi and Kako decide to join Maestru's singing group after hearing a song called "Yo To Ho!" (based on the classical opera tune "Ride of the Valkyries").
25	"Fishing!"	Josh Selig and Scott Preston	September 15, 2004
Grampu takes Oobi fishing. They learn about patience and eventually catch a fish. However, Oobi feels bad for the fish and convinces Grampu that they should set it free.
26	"Superheroes!"	Josh Selig and Scott Preston	September 15, 2004
Oobi, Uma, and Kako visit the park and pretend to be superheroes. They pretend to fly around and help people in need. When they find Mrs. Johnson's cat stuck in a tree, they use teamwork to bring her down.
