= Famil =

Famil is a given name. Notable people with the name include:

- Famil Jamalov (born 1998), Azerbaijani footballer
- Famil Mehdi (1934–2003), Azerbaijani poet

== See also ==
- Famil-e Door, Iranian fictional puppet character
