= Pesar Ammeh Za =

Fictional puppet character

- Kolah Ghermezi character
- First appearance: Kolah Ghermezi 88
- Created by: Iraj Tahmasb; Hamid Jebeli
- Portrayed by: Amir Soltan Ahmadi
- Voiced by: Mohammad-Reza Hedayati

In-universe information
- Species: Humanoid puppet
- Gender: Male
- Relatives: Kolah Ghermezi (cousin)

Pesar Ammeh Za (Persian: پسرعمه‌زا, lit. 'Cousin Za') is a fictional puppet character performed by Amir Soltan Ahmadi in Kolah Ghermezi, an Iranian series of television shows and films. His voice is mainly provided by the comedian Mohammad Reza Hedayati, with Ahmadi substituting for some scenes.

Pesar Ammeh Za is the imaginative but mischievous cousin of the main character, Kolah Ghermezi. He hails from a rural village and does not understand his cousin's urban way of life. He is a troublemaker who loves to eat sweets and chocolates. A running gag in his appearances is his insistence that his two imaginary friends, Pumpkin and Torpedo, are real people.

He first appeared as a recurring guest in the Kolah Ghermezi 88 series, and was promoted to a main cast member in Kolah Ghermezi 91 and the film Kolah Ghermezi and Bache Naneh. He has since become one of the primary characters, appearing in every new iteration of the franchise since 2009.

== Character ==
A major part of Pesar Ammeh Za's character is his rural upbringing, which makes him an outcast among Kolah Ghermezi and friends. He moved from his village to the city to live with Kolah Ghermezi. He has a rural accent and is often confused by modern ways of life. Like his cousin, he had a habit of speaking too quickly when he was young.

Pesar Ammeh Za is sometimes portrayed as an antagonist to Kolah Ghermezi, due to his mischievous and selfish nature.
