= Children's film =

Film genre

A children's film, or family film, is a film genre that generally relates to children in the context of home and family. Children's films are made specifically for children and not necessarily for a general audience, while family films are made for a wider appeal with a general audience in mind. Children's films come in several major genres like realism, fantasy, adventure, war, musicals, comedy, and literary adaptations.

== Psychological aspects ==
Children are born with certain innate biological dispositions as a product of long evolutionary history. This provides an underlying biological framework for what may fascinate a child and also impose limitations on the same. These can be seen in certain universal features shared in children's films. According to Grodal, films like Finding Nemo (2003), Bambi (1942), or Hayao Miyazaki's Spirited Away (2001) are based on certain strong emotions like fear, that lead to the activation of what Boyer and Lienard called the hazard-precaution system. This enables the brain to take precautions in case of danger. Children's films such as these explore various topics such as: attachment to parenting agency; the development of friendship; reciprocal relationships between individuals; or deal with the necessity or need in children and young people to explore and to engage in play. Thus these diverse films deal with certain aspects that are not mere social constructions, but rather emotions relevant to all children and therefore have an appeal to a wider universal audience. While cultural aspects shape how various films are created, these films refer to underlying universal aspects that are innate and biological. University of Melbourne scholar Timothy Laurie criticises the emphasis placed on children's innate psychic tendencies, noting that "pedagogical norms have been tirelessly heaped onto children's media", and that rather than deriving from hardwired biology, "the quality of childhood is more likely shaped by social policy, political opportunism, pedagogical institutions, and youth-specific market segmentation".

== Terminology ==
In the United States and Europe, the idea of children's films began to gain relative prominence in the 1930s. According to Bazalgette and Staples, the term "family film" is essentially an American expression while "children's film" is considered to be a European expression. The difference between the terms can be seen in casting methods adopted by American and European films respectively. In American family films, the search for a child protagonist involves casting children who meet a specific criterion or standard for physical appearance. In contrast, European children's films look to cast children who appear "ordinary". Similarly, in American family films, the adult cast can be composed of well known actors or actresses in an effort to attract a wider audience, presenting narratives from an adult or parental perspective. This is shown through the casting, content of the plot, editing, and even mise-en-scène. According to Bazalgette and Staples, a fine example of a family film is Honey, I Shrunk the Kids (1989), which if it were a European children's film with a similar plot, the title would be Sis, Dad Shrunk Us, explaining that European children's films are told from the child's perspective, portraying the story through the various emotions and experiences of the child. Because of these differences, American family films are more easily marketable toward domestic and international viewing audiences while European children's films are better received domestically with limited appeal to international audiences.

== United States ==
=== 1930s to 1950s ===
The Walt Disney Company made animated adaptations of Grimms' Fairy Tales before World War II, beginning with Snow White and the Seven Dwarfs (1937). The period immediately before and during World War II saw the release of three significant family films in the U.S. These were Snow White and the Seven Dwarfs by Disney, Gulliver's Travels by Fleischer Studios, and Pinocchio (1940), also by Disney. All of these were loose adaptations of literary sources.

After the war, Disney continued to make animated features that could be classified as family films given the scope of its content. According to Wojcik, the most important film adaptations of children's literature in the immediate post-World War II period were the motion pictures The Diary of Anne Frank by George Stevens (1959), Treasure Island (1950) by Byron Haskin and Luigi Comencini's 1952 motion picture Heidi.

=== 1960s to 1990s ===
In the 1960s, motion pictures such as To Kill a Mockingbird (1962) and Oliver! (1968), directed by Carol Reed, portrayed children as naturally innocent. Other films of the 1960s that involved children include The Sound of Music (1965) by Robert Wise and The Miracle Worker (1962). These were very successful musical motion picture that were in the genre of family films. Four of the top ten highest-grossing films of the decade were family films: The Sound of Music, One Hundred and One Dalmatians (1961), The Jungle Book (1967), and Mary Poppins (1964). Hollywood also released motion pictures starring children though these were not commercially successful and they were literary adaptations nonetheless. These include ...And Now Miguel (1966), Doctor Dolittle (1967), and The Learning Tree (1969). Other family/children films of the decade include Pollyanna (1960), Swiss Family Robinson (1960), In Search of the Castaways (1962), The Sword in the Stone (1963), That Darn Cat! (1965), Up the Down Staircase (1967), To Sir, With Love (1967), Yours, Mine and Ours (1968), and The Parent Trap (1961).

Children's films in the 1970s from the United States include animated films such as The Aristocats (1970), Charlotte's Web (1973), Robin Hood (1973), The Rescuers (1977), and The Hobbit (1977). The decade also had live action children's films like Willy Wonka & the Chocolate Factory (1971), Sounder (1972), Benji (1974), The Bad News Bears (1976), Freaky Friday (1976), and A Hero Ain't Nothin' but a Sandwich (1978), the divorce drama involving a child Kramer vs. Kramer (1978), and The Muppet Movie (1979). There were also combination live action/animation films such as 1971's Bedknobs and Broomsticks and Pete's Dragon (1977). This trend of films inspired the 1980s and 1990s productions of classic children's films from America including Beauty and the Beast (1991) and Matilda (1996).

American children's and family films of the 1980s include Popeye (1980), The Fox and the Hound (1981), Steven Spielberg's E.T. the Extra-Terrestrial (1982), The Great Mouse Detective (1986), and The Little Mermaid (1989). Spielberg portrays children realistically, having to cope with issues. This is seen in E.T. the Extra Terrestrial, where the children have to cope with the issues of single parenting and divorce, as well as separation from their father. Also, in the motion picture Empire of the Sun (1987), the protagonist child Jim Graham has to deal with separation from his parents for years, to the point where he is unable to even remember what his mother looked like. He is wounded not by bullets, but by the madness and cruelty of war and separation from his parents. According to Robin Wood, in their films, Lucas and Spielberg both reconstruct "... the adult spectator as a child ..." or "... an adult who would like to be a child". Other important children's films from the U.S. in the late 1970s include Close Encounters of the Third Kind (1977). Live action films like Superman (1978) and Superman II are also important children's and family films. They have been ranked as some of the best family entertainment over the past generation. The 1970s and 1980s also include several films and their sequels as classics of family films, including: Star Wars (1977) and its sequels The Empire Strikes Back (1980) and Return of the Jedi (1983). Other similar movies and sequels include Robert Zemeckis's film Back to the Future (1985) and its sequels Back to the Future Part II (1989) and Back to the Future Part III (1990).

"Since the resurgence of Disney feature films with The Little Mermaid (1989)", writes Laurie, "high-budget animations have become part of the Hollywood box office furniture, with phenomenal successes from Pixar Studios, DreamWorks animations and more recently, Blue Sky Studios". Important animated family films of the 1990s include Disney titles such as Beauty and the Beast (1991), Aladdin (1992), The Lion King (1994), Mulan (1998), The Hunchback of Notre Dame (1996), and the Pixar animated films Toy Story (1995), its sequel Toy Story 2 (1999), and A Bug's Life (1998). This decade introduced the modern fairy tale film Edward Scissorhands (1990), depicting an isolated, artificially created young man with human emotions and childlike qualities who is ultimately rejected by society while the female protagonist holds on to his memory. The 1990s also saw additional live-action family films such as Back to the Future Part III (1990), which brought the Back to the Future franchise into this decade, Teenage Mutant Ninja Turtles (1990), Home Alone (1990) and its sequel Home Alone 2: Lost in New York (1992), Hook (1991), Alan & Naomi (1992), Jurassic Park (1993), Steve Zaillian's Searching for Bobby Fischer (1993), Super Mario Bros. (1993), Mrs. Doubtfire (1993), The Flintstones (1994), Babe (1995), Jumanji (1995), 101 Dalmatians (1996), Fly Away Home (1996), Vegas Vacation (1997), and October Sky (1999). Films such as A Little Princess (1995) were more successful in the home video market than in theaters. Direct-to-video became important for both animated and live-action films, such as The Return of Jafar (1994), and those starring Mary-Kate and Ashley Olsen.

== Europe ==
In the 1930s and 1940s, a children's film studio was set up in Moscow. Several films were imported from this studio to the United Kingdom including The Magic Fish, The Land of Toys, and The Humpbacked Horse. Post World War II children's films include the Italian neorealist film Bicycle Thieves, by Vittorio De Sica (1948). According to Goldstein and Zornow, Clement's French film, Forbidden Games (1952), features children in the scenario of war, and shows the gap between children and adults. This period also includes the Czech children's film Journey to the Beginning of Time (1955), directed by Karel Zeman. In the 1960s, important European children's films include the British-Italian romance film Romeo and Juliet (1968), and the French film L'Enfant sauvage (1969). French film directors Louis Malle and François Truffaut made significant contributions to children's films. Louis Malle made the films Zazie dans le Métro (1960), Murmur of the Heart (1971), and Pretty Baby (1978). The works of Truffaut include The 400 Blows (1959), The Wild Child (1970) and Small Change (1976). The film making style of Malle and Truffaunt inspired present day directors in making children's films; including Ponette (1996) directed by Jacques Doillon, which deals with the emotional and psychological pain and hurt that children experience "... while living without parental love and care". Other important European children's cinema in the 1960s include The Christmas Tree (1969), which tells the story of a child coping with his imminent death due to leukemia, and Robert Bresson's film Mouchette (1964), which deals with the suicide of a 14-year-old girl. According to Wojcik, the contrast between films like Mary Poppins and Mouchette shows the ambiguous or schizoid nature of the depiction of children in the 1960s.

European children's films from the 1970s and 1980s include: the German film directed by Wim Wenders, Alice in den Städten (1974); the Spanish film The Spirit of the Beehive (1973); Fanny & Alexander directed by Ingmar Bergman; the Danish film Pelle the Conqueror (1988); The NeverEnding Story (1984), directed by German director Wolfgang Petersen; the Danish film, Me and Mamma Mia (1989); and the Hungarian film Love, Mother (1987). Autumn Sonata by Ingmar Bergman is also an important cinema in the genre of family films, although it deals with issues between parent and child which the child expresses after reaching adulthood. The 1990s include the important Russian films Burnt by the Sun (1994) and The Thief (1997), both of which are set in post-revolutionary Russia of 1917. In the 2000s, important European children's films include the Finnish film Mother of Mine (2005), the Italian short film Il supplente ("The Substitute") (2007), and the Polish animated film Peter and the Wolf (2006). In 2010s the Belgian, French language film, The Kid with a Bike (2011) stands as an important children's film.

=== Britain ===
In the 1960s, the UK made motion pictures dealing with children that are now regarded as classics. These films include The Loneliness of the Long Distance Runner (1962), Lord of the Flies (1963), Born Free (1966), To Sir, with Love (1967) (based on E. R. Braithwaite's real experiences), and if.... (1968). The list also includes the film Kes (1969). Some children's motion pictures belong to the category of avant-garde films because of the unconventional and often controversial treatment of the subject. According to film scholars; an important example of an avant-garde children's film is the British film Pink Floyd The Wall (1982). Pink Floyd The Wall is an unconventional and controversial motion picture that has a haunting and powerful nightmarish depiction of alienated childhood, boarding school separation, maternal deprivation, separation anxiety, war, and consumerist greed that affects a child and further affects his relationships and experiences in adulthood. It shows the child with non traditional images and the social changes that has occurred with family. In Pink Floyd The Wall the representation of child and family "stresses confrontation, confusion, dysfunctionality and history".

== Asia ==
In the 1960s, important children's films from Japan include Bad Boys (1960), based on the lives of children in a reform school for juvenile delinquents, and Boy (1969). In the 1960s, important children's films from Asia include the film Goopy Gyne Bagha Byne (1969) by Satyajit Ray. South India gave us the children's film Daisy (1988), depicting children in a boarding school and their experience of separation and longing. Other children's films from this region also include Abhayam (1991), which is also known by the alternative title, Shelter, by Sivan. It was awarded the Silver Elephant and Special International Jury & CIFEJ Jury Awards at the 7th International Children's Film Festival. India also has a neo-realist children's film about street children in Mumbai, Salaam Bombay (1988) by Mira Nair. It depicts the cruel way in which adults treat children in India by showing the hard life of street children in Mumbai (also called as Bombay). Important children's films from India also include the Bollywood films Masoom (1983) and Mr. India (1987); both directed by Shekhar Kapoor. Other important children's films include the reproduction of the German Fairy tales of the Grimm brothers by the Israeli film companies Golan Globus and Cannon Films in their series called Cannon Movie Tales, which includes: The Frog Prince (1986), starring Aileen Quinn, Helen Hunt, and John Paragon; Beauty and the Beast (1987), starring John Savage; and Puss in Boots (1988), starring Christopher Walken. From Japan, Miyazaki's Spirited Away was voted as the number one film that must be seen by 14 years of age. That list also included the Māori film Whale Rider (2002). Another important children's film is Son of Maryam (1998), directed by Hamid Jebeli and set in Azerbaijan. It deals with the relationship between a Muslim boy and an Armenian priest.

== South Africa, Canada and Argentina ==
Children's films from South Africa include Tsotsi (2006). Another collection of family films is the anthology of 20 Canadian and European motion picture productions titled Tales for All. This includes the Canadian children's film Bach and Broccoli (Bach et Bottine) (1986) and the Argentine film Summer of the Colt (1990), directed by André Mélancon.

== See also ==
- List of children's films
  - List of children's animated films
- Children's BBC
- Children's literature
- Children's music
- Children's television series
