= The Pastry Girl =

- Directed by: Iraj Tahmasb
- Written by: Iraj Tahmasb
- Produced by: Majid Modaresi; Hamid Modarresi
- Cinematography: Aziz Saati
- Edited by: Hossein Zandbaf
- Music by: Mohammad Reza Aligholi
- Production company: Sahra Film
- Release date: 11 September 2002
- Running time: 98 minutes
- Country: Iran
- Language: Persian

The Pastry Girl (Persian: دختر شیرینی‌فروش Dokhtar-e Shirini-Foroush) is a 2001 Iranian film written and directed by Iraj Tahmasb. It was the second highest-grossing Iranian film of 2002.

== Cast ==
- Fatemeh Motamed-Arya as Niloufar
- Soraya Ghasemi as Mrs. Rostami
- Iraj Tahmasb as Saeed Saatchi
- Hamid Jebeli as Taghi Saatchi
- Ghasem Zare as Guard Officer
- Yousef Teymouri as Hamid Rostami
- Khosro Ahmadi as Mostafa
- Mohsen Ghazi Moradi as Uncle
- Saeid Pirdoost as Landlord
- Faranaz Manaf Zaher as Akhtar
- Saeed Nourollahi as Marriage Officiant
- Seyed Jalal Tabatabaei as Carpet Seller

== Reception ==
In his review for Variety Robert Koehler stated: "Iraj Tahmasb’s broad Farsi farce “The Pastry Girl” pokes fun at the customs of Iranian wedlock, but its tone-deaf sense of humor and overextended storyline give it the appearance of a sitcom stretched to the bigscreen."
