= Famil-e Door =

Famil-e Door فامیل دور
- First appearance: Kolah Ghermezi 90
- Last appearance: Mehmani (2024-)
- Created by: Iraj Tahmasb – Hamid Jebelli
- Portrayed by: Mohammad Loghmanian
- Voiced by: Bahador Maleki

In-universe information
- Alias: Famil
- Species: Human Puppet
- Gender: Male

Famil-e Door (in Persian: فامیل دور, lit. Distant relative) is an Iranian fictional puppet character who was first introduced in Kolah Ghermezi TV series in 2011. Famil-e Door is a door-keeper who is from Door (in Persian: دور, lit. Far; a fictional village in Iran) and has a wife. In 2014, he also becomes a father. Though Famil-e Door is older than the rest of the characters, he participates in all their plans and games, and sometimes is even naughtier than the kids. He is a very sweet and witty puppet. One of his major characteristics is being very much interested in doors as he is a doorkeeper. He frequently says "door" as he speaks and always cares if they are properly closed. He also immediately responds to any door knock or similar sounds. His son who debuted in Kolah Ghermezi 93 (2014), looks much like him. He uses the same phrases and body language as his father. He is one of the most favourite amongst the other puppets in this show, and frequently in any survey, rated as the top favourite. He has a sister in law named Shooreh.

== Creation ==
Iraj Tahmasb, the creator of the series needed new puppets for 2010 program and he asked Marzieh Mahboub (The puppet-maker of the series) to introduce him some voice actors. She also introduced Bahador Maleki, who had a Bachelor's degree in Puppetry and he had a great role in creation of the characteristics of Famil-e Door.

== Catchphrases ==
He uses different catchphrases in the series like "What happened?", "What did he say?", "How do I look like right now?", "Sir Dagh" (sit down) to sit Baba'ee down, "Me?", "My first name is Famil and my last name is Door", etc. He is obsessed with doors and frequently talks about them in his speeches and poems. He also mispronounces the "L" sound as a "R".
