= A Show of Hands (TV series) =

Short film series by Tim Lagasse

- Scene from the episode "Painting"
- Created by: Tim Lagasse
- Written by: Tim Lagasse
- Directed by: Agi Fodor
- Starring: Tim Lagasse; Jim Napolitano
- Country of origin: United States
- Original language: English
- No. of seasons: 1
- No. of episodes: 6

Production
- Producer: Agi Fodor
- Production location: University of Connecticut (Storrs, Connecticut)
- Camera setup: Single-camera
- Running time: 1 minute
- Production company: Nickelodeon Productions

Original release
- Network: Nickelodeon
- Release: 1996

Related
- Oobi; Oobi: Dasdasi

A Show of Hands is a series of short films created by puppeteer Tim Lagasse for Nickelodeon. It was a predecessor to the television program Oobi. Each film is about one minute long and follows personified hands as they perform a small skit or a visual illusion. The series started airing on Nickelodeon as an interstitial program in 1996, and reruns were shown through 1997. The title is a reference to the phrase "show of hands," used literally to refer to a television show about hands.

Lagasse wrote, directed, and performed A Show of Hands at the University of Connecticut while earning his BFA in Puppet Arts. The original live show received an UNIMA. The series was directed by Agi Fodor (creator of Nick in the Afternoon) and was shot in black and white, with the exception of the vanity card that appears at the end of each film. After the conclusion of the series, Lagasse went to work as a director and performer on Nickelodeon's Oobi, which features similar bare hand puppets as characters. His work on A Show of Hands was what led to him being cast on Oobi.

The films were positively received and won a Broadcast Design International. In 2001, Lagasse began performing an extended live version of the Show of Hands skits at the HERE Arts Center in New York.

== Format ==
The films follow a similar format and include recurring elements. Each film opens with seven white-gloved hands forming a cartoonish face that announces, "And now, Nickelodeon presents A Show of Hands." The hands disperse and present the main part of the short. It involves individual hands silently acting out skits. Once the short finishes, an audience of hands gives a big round of applause. The films close with a shot of the Nickelodeon logo on a hand painted orange.

== History ==
The films were produced and shot at Viacom's New York City headquarters. According to Lagasse, the films were "based on earlier work."

In 1992, The New York Times reported that MTV had expressed interest in producing a project based on Lagasse's production. The resulting interstitial series would instead be produced for Viacom's children's network Nickelodeon. The series ran as an interstitial program on Nickelodeon from 1996 to 1997. The series also aired on Nickelodeon's Noggin network and in international markets, including on the Australian branch of Nickelodeon.

On November 16, 2001, Lagasse debuted an extended live version of A Show of Hands at the HERE Arts Center in New York City. Unlike in the television version, Lagasse was the sole performer and did not use gloves. Each performance lasted one hour and incorporated a blend of new material and techniques from the original films.

== Cast ==
- Tim Lagasse - lead performer
- Jim Napolitano - ensemble puppeteer
- Rick Lyon

== Episodes ==
No.	Title	Length (in minutes)
1	"Ballet"	1:06
A group of hands performs a ballet routine.
2	"Bow Tying"	1:00
Three hands learn that they must use teamwork to tie a bow onto a gift box.
3	"Holding Hands"	1:06
A male hand tries to get a female hand to hold his hand by flirting with her.
4	"Magic Trick"	Unknown
Two pairs of magician hands, one red and the other blue, appear and do magic tricks. They use a glass of water and some playing cards to create the illusion of two of the same card appearing.
5	"Painting"	1:00
An artist hand tries to paint a portrait of another hand, but the other hand cannot keep still to hold a pose.
6	"Piano"	Unknown
Two pairs of hands play "Flight of the Bumblebee" on a grand piano together.

== Awards ==
Year	Presenter	Category/Award	Recipient	Status	Ref.
1993	Union Internationale de la Marionette	Citation for Excellence	Tim Lagasse	Won	
1997	BDA International Design Awards	Produced In-House: National/International Live-Action (silver)	Tim Lagasse	Won	

== See also ==
- History of Nickelodeon
