= Oobi: Dasdasi =

Iranian children's TV series

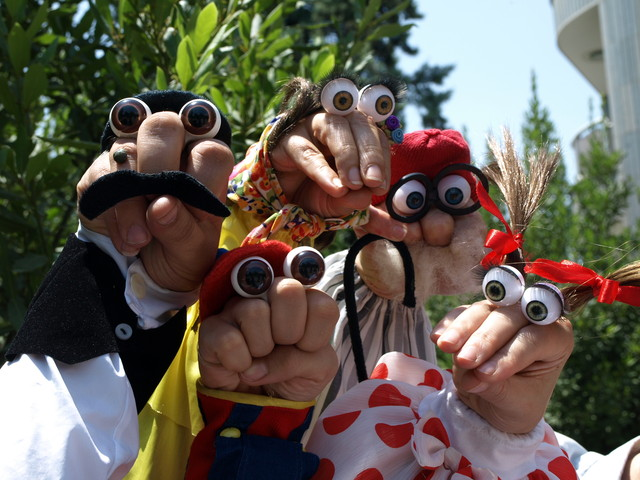
- The puppet characters in their costumes
- Also known as: Dasdasi
- Persian: دس دسی صداش می آد
- Genre: Comedy; Puppetry
- Based on: Oobi by Josh Selig
- Developed by: Negar Estakhr
- Directed by: Amir Soltan Ahmadi
- Starring: Amir Soltan Ahmadi; Negar Estakhr; Bahador Maleki; Banafsheh Samadi; Isa Yousefipour
- Composer: Amirali Razaghi
- Country of origin: Iran
- Original language: Persian
- No. of seasons: 2
- No. of episodes: 78

Production
- Producer: Negar Estakhr
- Production locations: Tehran, Iran
- Camera setup: Multi-camera
- Running time: 8 minutes
- Production company: Islamic Republic of Iran Broadcasting

Original release
- Network: IRIB TV2
- Release: 22 September – 20 December 2012

Related
- Oobi

Oobi: Dasdasi (Persian: دس دسی صداش می آد; English translation: Dasdasi: Clapping Hands) is an Iranian children's television series created for channel IRIB TV2. It is an adaptation of the American television series Oobi. It was produced by Negar Estakhr and directed by Amir Soltan Ahmadi, two puppeteers who also starred on the program. The show featured performers Bahador Maleki, Banafsheh Samadi, and Isa Yousefipour.

In an interview with the newspaper Jaam-e Jam, Estakhr said that the idea for the show came about after watching Oobi in English. She wanted to make a tailored version for an Iranian audience, so some of its characters and locations highlight elements of Iranian culture. The series follows a family of characters represented by bare-hand puppets. The stories have a heavy emphasis on comedy and typically follow the children of the family as they discover something new.

A total of 78 eight-minute episodes were made for the first season. They aired from 22 September to 20 December 2012, with six new segments premiering every week for three months. A second season was confirmed in a 2012 interview with the creators, but it did not play in Iran. In July 2013, the series was sold to international markets in Southeast Asia and Japan, becoming one of IRIB's first children's shows to air outside of Iran.

== Plot ==
The main characters are a family of five: a boy and a girl, their parents, and their grandfather. The kids are mischievous and like to play tricks on their parents and each other; they are impressionable, easily amused, and known for frequently daydreaming. However, they are also genuinely curious about the world. They often ask their parents about science topics, like perception and the four seasons. Other times, they are interested in sillier things, like how to buy ice cream or play a mimicking game. No matter the episode's topic, the kids always learn about it in an awkward and humorous way.

The stories are eight minutes each with two or three intermissions. The intermissions are transition scenes in which a duo of puppets, called the Palms, have short adventures that relate to the episode's topic. They are sometimes joined by their friend Finger.

== Cast ==
- Amir Soltan Ahmadi
- Negar Estakhr
- Bahador Maleki
- Banafsheh Samadi
- Isa Yousefipour

== Production and broadcast ==
Negar Estakhr produced the series and Amir Soltan Ahmadi directed it. After watching the original American version of Oobi, Estakhr pitched the idea of an Iranian version to IRIB TV2; she explained, "I accidentally saw a program called Oobi and I really enjoyed it... Of course, on Oobi, the hands had no coverings, but we designed clothes for the hands." Estakhr's pitch focused on how Oobi had been successful with audiences in America and other international markets.

Estakhr and Ahmadi hired veteran puppeteers from Kolah Ghermezi, one of Iran's longest-running puppet series. They cast male puppeteers with wide hands for the father and grandfather puppets, and female puppeteers with small hands for the children and women puppets. After assembling the cast, the actors held an impromptu photo shoot with their hand puppets to develop an understanding of their characters. Amirali Razaghi was hired to produce the show's music; he is a film score composer who previously worked as a music teacher at the Tehran University of Art.

The series was first announced in January 2012 when IRIB added it to the upcoming series section of its website. During filming, the writers worked closely with a think tank of IRIB staff members who ensured that each episode included the right blend of family-friendly humor. Production started on 21 May 2012 and ended on 20 September.

The first episode aired on 22 September. From then until 20 December, a new episode premiered once per day from Saturday to Thursday each week.

In July 2013, the series was screened and pitched to international broadcasters at a conference held by the Asia-Pacific Broadcasting Union. The Japanese station NHK obtained distribution rights for the series in Japan. It also aired in several Southeast Asian territories: Kuwait, Malaysia, Thailand, Indonesia, and Sri Lanka.

=== Second season ===
A second season entered development after the first. In an interview from December 2012, Estakhr confirmed that a second season was being made. The writers planned to introduce outdoor locations, namely a village and a forest, in addition to a cast of animal characters. The animals would be portrayed similarly to hand-shadow puppets. Season two would follow the family as the kids entered kindergarten, the family planted a garden, and the family learned about the water cycle.
