= HaHa Nick =

Chinese TV programming block

- Network: SMG
- Launched: 1 May 2005
- Closed: October 2007; 17 years ago
- Country of origin: China; Mongolia; Hong Kong; Macau
- Owner: SMG (51%); Viacom (49%)
- Headquarters: Shanghai
- Format: Children's television
- Running time: 6 hours
- Official website: web.archive.org/web/20050806233124/https://www.hahanick.com/TVShows/Show_Info

HaHa Nick (also spelled HAHA Nick; Chinese: 哈哈尼克) was a television programming block co-produced by Nickelodeon and Shanghai Media Group (SMG). It consisted of original live-action host programs and several of Nickelodeon's flagship American shows, dubbed in Mandarin. It aired on multiple SMG channels, mainly their children's network, Oriental.

The block began development in March 2004, following a change in China's media regulations that allowed foreign ownership of televised content. Sumner Redstone, the chairman of Nickelodeon's parent company Viacom, oversaw the creation of the block. HaHa Nick marked the first time that a foreign investor took an equity stake in a major Chinese content producer. The block premiered on 1 May 2005, and stopped airing in October 2007. It ran for 6 hours daily, with start and end times depending on the day of the week.

Around 100 episodes of the block's original host programs were produced. The on-air continuity featured the host characters from these programs, in addition to original animation created by local Shanghai studios. Dubbed content included Oobi, Blue's Clues, ChalkZone and The Fairly OddParents. After HaHa Nick stopped airing, two of the host shows were retooled for SMG without Nickelodeon's involvement.

== History ==
=== Creation ===
The creation of HaHa Nick was first announced in March 2004. China's State Administration of Radio, Film, and Television had recently passed new legislation that allowed foreign ownership of television content. This made Viacom, Nickelodeon's parent company, "jump at the opportunity" to establish a partnership with a major Chinese TV station. Viacom chairman Sumner Redstone visited Shanghai in March 2004 to discuss a Nickelodeon-branded programming block with Shanghai Media Group. Negotiations continued until November 2004, when Nickelodeon and SMG formally ratified their partnership. The venture was planned to have an authorized capital of $6 million. By establishing HaHa Nick, Nickelodeon became the first foreign investor to take an equity stake in a Chinese content producer.

To comply with government regulations, Viacom only held a 49 percent stake in HaHa Nick. Both Viacom and SMG sold advertising and shared revenue from the block. MTV Networks chairman Bill Roedy called HaHa Nick a "strategically significant development for MTV's and Nickelodeon's positions in China," noting that "China has the creative talent to become one of the world's leading animation hubs, and HaHa Nick is tapping into the local industry."

The Guardian reported that Nickelodeon would also produce a parallel block for Beijing Television, but Viacom denied this, stating that HaHa Nick was their only programming venture to date in China.

=== Programming ===
Nickelodeon supplied SMG with raw copies of their flagship American shows, beginning with Oobi (which was localized as 小手乌比, meaning "Little Hand Oobi") and Blue's Clues. SMG translated the scripts into Mandarin and recorded Mandarin voice-overs at their in-house dubbing studio.

Nickelodeon also produced several original series, filmed locally in Shanghai. For the first few months of production, they contributed 25 hours of locally produced programming to HaHa Nick each week. Production was later increased to 50 hours of programming per week. The longest show was HaHa Nick Weekend Play, a variety show with a live studio audience that ran for two hours on Saturdays and Sundays. Other programs included SoNick, a lifestyle show that profiled the lives of Shanghai children, and Nick Tong: Painting Expert, an instructional art-themed show. In October 2007, right before the block was discontinued, food company Danone sponsored HaHa Nick's art-themed segments.

Animation for the on-air continuity and the original programs was produced by Chinese animation houses in and around Shanghai. The block's logo combined elements of both SMG and Nickelodeon's iconography. "HaHa" refers to SMG's children's mascot, a purple frog named HaHa. Geoffrey Fowler of The Wall Street Journal described its logo: "The logo for HaHa Nick ... features the trademark orange Nickelodeon splat and the word 'Nick' as the dot to an exclamation point that says 'HaHa.'"

=== Broadcast ===
HaHa Nick premiered on SMG's Oriental channel on 1 May 2005. When the block debuted, it was available to 3.5 million households in China. Throughout 2005, it also syndicated several of its shows to China's 30 regional children's cable channels, available to another 100 million households. To promote the block's premiere, Nickelodeon held a HaHa Nick roadshow that toured Shanghai. It also launched a website called HAHANick.com. Toys and online games based on HaHa Nick began production by March 2005.

In September 2005, Viacom's co-president Tom Freston said HaHa Nick was "off to a good start." Sumner Redstone told The Hollywood Reporter "It's going very well."

== Programming ==
Original shows

- HaHa Nick Weekend Play
- Nick Tong: Painting Expert
- SoNick

Dubbed shows

- Blue's Clues
- ChalkZone
- Dora the Explorer
- Eureeka's Castle
- The Fairly OddParents
- Kenan & Kel
- Legends of the Hidden Temple
- Oobi (localized as 小手乌比)
