= Kolah Ghermezi and Pesar Khaleh =

- Directed by: Iraj Tahmasb
- Written by: Iraj Tahmasb Hamid Jebelli Homayoun Asadian
- Produced by: Mohammad Mahdi Dadgou Tasvir-e Zendegi co.
- Starring: Iraj Tahmasb; Fatemeh Motamed Aria; Hamid Jebelli; Hamideh Kheirabadi; Morteza Ahmadi; Farrokhlagha Houshmand
- Cinematography: Aziz Saati
- Edited by: Ruhollah Emami
- Music by: Mohammad Reza Aligholi
- Distributed by: Tasvir-e Zendegi co.
- Release date: 1995
- Running time: 92 minutes
- Country: Iran
- Language: Persian

Kolah Ghermezi and Pesar Khaleh (Persian: کلاه‌قرمزی و پسرخاله, romanized: Red Hat and Cousin) is a 1995 Iranian film directed by Iraj Tahmasb. The film is about Kolah Ghermezi, a popular puppet character of the early 1990s in Iran.

== Plot ==
Kolah Ghermezi is a naughty school boy. His playfulness gets him expelled from school and he fails to find a job. He sees a program on TV which attracts his attention and he goes to Tehran. With the help of Pesar Khaleh, he goes to the TV program he had seen and finds the reporter. He likes the reporter so much that he decides to help him overcome the obstacles he faces for getting married, but instead causes troubles. After a long travel to work as a showman in a kid's show, he finds it more difficult than he had assumed.

== Characters ==
- Kolah Ghermezi
- Pesar Khaleh
- Iraj Tahmasb as Mr. Mojri
- Fatemeh Motamed Aria as Narges
- Hamid Jebeli as Guard, Voice of Kolah Ghermezi and Pesar Khaleh
- Morteza Ahmadi as Father of Narges
- Hamideh Kheirabadi as Mother of Narges
- Farrokhlagha Houshmand as Kolah Ghermezi's Aunt
- Donya Fannizadeh as the puppeteer of Kolah Ghermezi and Pesar Khaleh

== Release and legacy ==
The movie was a best seller upon its release, and is the highest-grossing film in Iranian cinema after 29 years of its release. Its characters are found very lovable as the audience can manage to connect with them on a deep level. Kolah Ghermezi is found much more optimistic and explorative, and bringing good into the world, he is very connected to the “post-war development children” (Generation Y) and he is seen to demonstrate good mannerism in children. Pesar Khaleh whom is seen much more mature and caretaking, handling various tasks such as baking bread, calving ice, and heating the house warm, these task were often taken up by “the children of wartime” (Generation X) during the Iran-Iraq War.
