= Naser Tahmasb =

Iranian voice actor (1939–2023)

- ناصر طهماسب
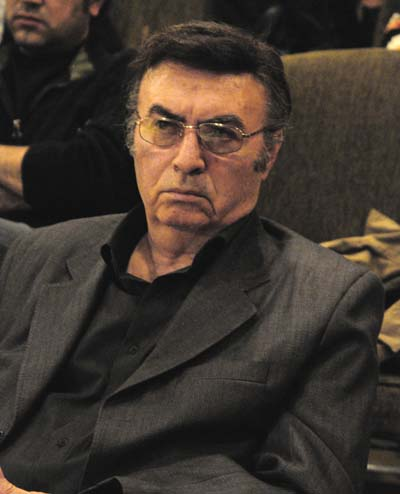
- Born: 16 December 1939; Jahrom, Iran
- Died: 22 December 2023 (aged 84); Tehran, Iran
- Occupation: Voice acting
- Years active: 1956–2000
- Known for: Doubler of famous actors of world cinema
- Relatives: Iraj Tahmasb (Brother)

Naser Tahmasb (Persian: ناصر طهماسب; 16 December 1939 – 22 December 2023) was an Iranian voice actor, announcer, and dubbing manager.

== Life and career ==
Tahmasb entered the field of dubbing in 1956 and worked on both foreign and Iranian films. In the eighties, he was known as Harold Lloyd, Jack Nicholson, Gary Cooper, Michael Caine, Steve McQueen and Dustin Lee Hoffman' constant voiceover and appeared in several films of these actors have spoken.

== Death ==
Tahmasb died on 22 December 2023, at the age of 84.

== Filmography ==
=== Dubbing ===
Covered Actor	Film
Harold Lloyd	The Cat's-Paw
Gary Cooper	Ball of Fire High Noon Vera Cruz (film) Garden of Evil
Steve McQueen	The Thomas Crown Affair (1968 film)
Michael Caine	Sleuth (1972 film)
Jack Nicholson	Chinatown (1974 film) One Flew Over the Cuckoo's Nest (film) The Last Tycoon (1976 film) The Shining (film) The Bucket List
Dustin Lee Hoffman	Papillon (1973 film)
