= Tim Lagasse =

American puppeteer

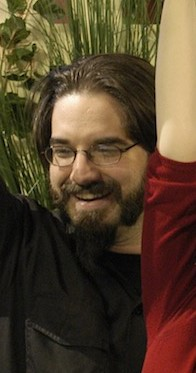
- Lagasse on the set of Oobi in 2004
- Born: Timothy Lagasse; 1968 or 1969 (age 57–58); Milford, Connecticut, U.S.
- Education: University of Connecticut (BFA)
- Occupations: Puppeteer; puppet designer; director
- Years active: 1991–present
- Website: timlagasse.com

Timothy Lagasse (born 1968/1969) is an American puppeteer, puppet designer, and director. He has worked on films and television programs for Sesame Workshop, Nickelodeon, Disney XD, and HBO. He is known for playing the title character on Noggin's Oobi, and Crash on Disney XD's Crash & Bernstein.

Lagasse has been nominated for three Daytime Emmy Awards. In 1991, he became the first recipient of the Jim Henson Memorial Prize in Puppetry. In 1993 he was presented with a Citation for Excellence by UNIMA; and later that year, received a Broadcast Design Silver Award for his series of short films, A Show of Hands.

== Biography ==
Lagasse was born in Milford, Connecticut. He attended St. Mary's School and Notre Dame High School in West Haven, and graduated from the University of Connecticut in 1992 with a BFA in Puppet Arts.

One of his earliest roles was Mr. Cook on the Nickelodeon series Allegra's Window. He also played the title character on the Noggin's Oobi series, and Crash on Disney XD's Crash & Bernstein. He has performed additional characters on Sesame Street, The Muppets and the 2008 film A Muppets Christmas: Letters to Santa. In addition to his performance credits, he has built puppets for The Jim Henson Company and Puppet Heap.

Lagasse also teaches the art of puppetry, lecturing at the Lincoln Center Foundation and instructing students on modern puppetry techniques at the University of Connecticut's Puppet Arts Program. In 2011 he offered workshops on building puppets at the University of Central Arkansas as part of Heather Henson's Handmade Puppet Dreams Film Festival. In 2012 he traveled to Haiti with No Strings Productions as a puppet workshop trainer.

== Filmography ==
Year	Title	Credit(s)	Role(s)	Ref.
1994–1996	Allegra's Window	Principal puppeteer	Mr. Cook; Tweeter	
1995–1998	Nick in the Afternoon	Principal puppeteer; Puppet designer; Puppet coordinator	Additional puppets	
1995	Weinerville	Guest puppeteer	Coach Loogi	
1996–1998	Once Upon a Tree	Principal Puppeteer; Puppet coordinator	Jasper the Hare, Bleu the Cricket	
1996–1998	The Wubbulous World of Dr. Seuss	Ensemble puppeteer	Fox in Socks; Junior Kangaroo; Little Cat P Sidney the Spider	
1997–2006	Bear in the Big Blue House	Ensemble puppeteer	Jet Setter Tutter	
1999–2000	A Little Curious	Principal puppeteer; Puppet coordinator; Puppet builder		
2000–present	Sesame Street	Ensemble puppeteer	Additional puppets	
2000–2010	Between the Lions	Principal puppeteer; Puppet designer; Director	Arty Smartypants; Barnaby B. Busterfield III; Gus the Bunny	
2000–2005	Oobi	Principal puppeteer; Puppet coordinator; Director (shorts)	Oobi; Taro	
2003–2006	Chappelle's Show	Puppet coordinator		
2003–2008	Paz	Principal puppeteer; Puppet coordinator	Paz	
2004	Blue's Room	Puppet designer	Polka Dots; Dress Up Chest	
2005–2009	Johnny and the Sprites	Principal puppeteer; Director (one episode)	Basil	
2006–2007	It's a Big Big World	Principal puppeteer; Director (seven episodes)	Wartz the Frog; Ick the Catfish	
2007	Imagination Movers	Puppet designer		
2008	A Muppets Christmas: Letters to Santa	Ensemble puppeteer	Additional puppets	
2010	The Electric Company	Director (ten episodes)		
2012–2014	Crash & Bernstein	Principal puppeteer	Crash	
2015–2016	The Muppets	Ensemble puppeteer	Additional puppets	
2017	The Muppets Take the Bowl	Ensemble puppeteer	Additional Muppet Performer, live show at the Hollywood Bowl, Sept. 8–10	
2018	The Muppets Take the O2	Ensemble puppeteer	Additional Muppet Performer, live show at the O2 Arena, Jul. 13–14	
2019–2023	Helpsters	Ensemble puppeteer	Scatter	
2026	The Muppet Show	Supporting Muppet Performer		

== Awards and nominations ==
Year	Presenter	Category/Award	Work	Status	Ref.
1991	University of Connecticut	Jim Henson Memorial Prize in Puppetry	N/A	Won	
1993	Union Internationale de la Marionette	Citation for Excellence	A Show of Hands	Won	
1993	Broadcast Design International	Broadcast Design Silver Award	A Show of Hands	Won	
2003	30th Daytime Emmy Awards	Outstanding Single Camera Editing	Between the Lions	Nominated	
2004	31st Daytime Emmy Awards	Outstanding Achievement in Costume Design/Styling	Between the Lions	Nominated	
2004	31st Daytime Emmy Awards	Outstanding Achievement in Single Camera Editing	Between the Lions	Nominated	
2005	American Theatre Wing	Henry Hewes Design Award	Uncle Jimmy's Dirty Basement	Nominated	
