= Son of Maryam =

- Directed by: Hamid Jebeli
- Written by: Hamid Jebeli
- Produced by: Fereshteh Taerpoor
- Starring: Mohsen Falsafin; Rafik Dergabrilian; Hadi Nainizadeh
- Music by: Pirooz Arjmand
- Release date: 1998
- Country: Iran
- Language: Persian

Son of Maryam (Persian: ﭕﺴﺮ مريم Pesar-e Maryam), is a 1998 Iranian drama film directed by Hamid Jebelli and starring Rafik Dergabrilian, Mohsen Falsafin, Hadi Nainizadeh. The movie is about a young Persian boy who befriends an Assyrian priest and learns tolerance toward Christians in post-revolution Iran.

== Synopsis ==
Rahman (Falsafin) Can is a milk delivery boy in a small village in Iran and is also the village's mosque crier. One day, he delivers some milk to the priest (Dergabrilian) living in the church on the outside of town. Amidst the villages preparations for Ashura, the priest's preparations for the Feast of Mary go unnoticed except by young Rahman. The young boy befriends the priest and spends his time sneaking his blind friend Davoud (Nainizadeh) into the church and helping the priest prepare for the feast, much to his father and grandmother's chagrin.

One day, while affixing a crucifix to the front of the Church, a rung on the ladder the priest is using breaks, and he severely injures himself. Rahman takes care of the priest until he is told to go to a nearby city, where the priest's brother lives. In the city he meets a young Christian by the name of Rafik who takes him to the city's church where he observes a Christian service for the first time.

Upon his return to his home village with the brother, the brother takes the old priest back to the city with him for medical care. The priest gives Rahman the keys to the church and a medal. In the next scene, the brother returns with a letter and a photo of Rahman and the priest together. The priest apparently has died. The film ends with the Village mourners begin their pilgrimage for Ashura.
