= Morteza Ahmadi =

Iranian actor, voice actor, singer and writer (1924–2014)

Morteza Ahmadi مرتضی احمدی
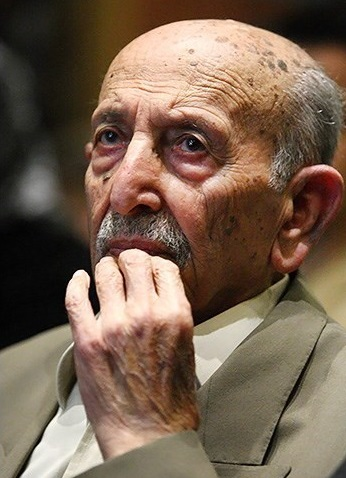
- Ahmadi celebrating his 89th birthday in 2013
- Born: Morteza Haj Seyed Ahmadi مرتضی حاج‌سیداحمدی; 1 November 1924; Tehran, Qajar Iran
- Died: 21 December 2014 (aged 90); Tehran, Iran
- Resting place: 88 Segment, Behesht-e Zahra Cemetery
- Citizenship: Iranian
- Occupations: Actor, singer, radio announcer, writer
- Years active: 1942–2006
- Spouse: Zahra Javanshir (1955–1971, her death)
- Children: Azita (b. 1958); Maziar (b. 1961)

Morteza Haj Seyed Ahmadi (Persian: مرتضی حاج‌سیداحمدی; 1 November 1924 – 21 December 2014) was an Iranian actor, voice actor, singer, and writer.

Ahmadi, who is known for nearly five decades of memorable performances, was born in 1924 in a neighbourhood in the south of the capital Tehran. In addition to being one of the most successful figures in the Iranian cinema, Ahmadi was known for his dubbing career. He was also known for singing different songs, including innovative types. Among Ahmadi’s works are Autobus, Madrak-e Jorm (exhibit piece) and Khane-kharab (homeless). He died on 21 December 2014.

== Early life and background ==
Morteza Ahmadi was born on 1 November 1924 in southern Tehran. He grew up in a working class part of Maktab and later attended Manouchehri school at first then later went to Roushan and Sharaf high schools. At age 16, Ahmadi started playing football and joined his school's football team. Later, he joined Rah Ahan and played for the club's amateur team until 1944. He was then employed at Iranian Railways as a repairman.

== Career ==
After several amateur theaters, he and his friends established the Tamashakhaneye Mah theater near Ferdows Garden in 1942. He then began Pardeh Khani for the first time in 1942. In the same year, he signed Golpari Joon. After that, he was invited to Radio Tehran. He was then banned for six months from his work after he signed a track criticizing Iran's Democratic Party, named Pirhan Zarde (The yellow shirts) that was the same as the party's colour. Later the ruling was cancelled by the Supreme Court and he returned to radio.

After the 1953 Iranian coup d'état, Ahmadi left Tehran and began living in Ahvaz. After seven years, he returned to Tehran and acted in a TV-series named Tak Mezrab. He then acted in Hassan Kachal and Soltan-e Sahebgharan.

== Personal life ==
Ahmadi married Zahra Javanshir, his colleague at Iranian Railway on 31 July 1955. Zahra died on 15 May 1971 due to cancer. The couple had one daughter, Azita (born 1958), and one son, Maziar (born 1961).

Ahmadi was a long-time fan of Persepolis F.C. and was honoured by the club in 2010 as the oldest recognized fan of the club at the time. He attended all of Persepolis' home matches at Azadi Stadium until 2013, before his illness. He also wore a red scarf and sat on seat number 6 of the stadium.

== Death ==
Morteza Ahmadi died on 21 December 2014 at 11 A.M. at his private home in Tehran. His funeral was held on 24 December and he was buried at Behesht-e Zahra cemetery.
