= Kolah Ghermezi and Bache Naneh =

2012 film by Iraj Tahmasb

Kolah Ghermezi and Bache Naneh (Persian: کلاه‌قرمزی و بچه‌ننه lit. 'Kolah Ghermezi and the Spoilt Kid') is a 2012 Iranian film directed by Iraj Tahmasb.

Kolah Ghermezi's cousin, Pesar Ammeh Za, that he stays at Iraj Tahmasb's house from Nowruz holidays, explodes The house and because of the Neighbours complaint he goes to jail.
