= Famil Mehdi =

Azerbaijani poet

Famil Mehdi (1934–2003) was an Azerbaijani poet, critic, publicist, a member of the Writers Union since 1959, a doctor of philology science (1974), and professor (1977).

== Life ==
Mehdi was born in the village Sarihajily of Aghdam district in Azerbaijan in 1934. He finished his education at Ahmedvar village school and continued his education in Pedagogical School in Aghdam. He continued his education at the Faculty of Philology of the Journalism department in Azerbaijan University of Languages(1953–1958). He started his work activity as a literary worker in a Baku evening newspaper.

He worked as a graduate student, teacher and as a head of the department of theory and practice of journalism in Azerbaijan University of Languages from 1973. He chose for himself a doctoral thesis about "The masterys problems of Azerbaijan art puplicity's" and he defended it. Mehdi died on September 26, 2003, in Baku.

== Poetry ==
He began his poetry career by publishing his first poem in the Aghdam village newspaper Lenin yolu (the way of Lenin). After this, he periodically participated in media events. His works were translated into many foreign languages.

He was one of the authors of "Journalism matters" (Jurnalistika məsələləri) for high school students.

"The masterys problems of Azerbaijan art puplicity's", "Fiery Puplicist Samad Vurghun", "Puplicity in press", "The art of puplicity" - these monographic books and manuals belong to him. He was the deputy of Baku city Council of People's Deputy.

He was honored with the laureate of Oqonyak magazine. He received a diploma according to the best scientific and popular works of "Bilik" (knowledge) corporation.

== Social activity ==
He created "Nicat" community during the early days of Karabakh War. With the aim of creating passion between young volunteers, he established "General Mahammad Asadov award".

== Works ==
1. "Sevendən beri" Bakı: Ushaqgancneshr, 1961, 29-page.
2. "Sade setirler." Bakı: Azerneshr, 1963, 29-page.
3. "Menim ulduzlarım". Bakı: Azerneshr, 1964, 95page..
4. "unvanım deyishir". Bakı: Azerneshr, 1966, 78-page..
5. "omurdən sehifeler," Bakı: Gandjlik, 1970, 76page.
6. "karabagh shikestesi." Bakı: Azerneshr, 1970, 93-page..
7. "İller və taleler." Bakı:Azerneshr, 1974, 141page.
8. "İnsan unudulmur." Bakı: Gandjlik, 1976, 195-page.
9. "Seni gozleyirem". Bakı: Azerneshr, 1978, 174page.
10. "Anam ele bilir". Bakı: Yazıchı, 1979, 200page.
11. "Tebriz xalısı". Bakı: Yazıchı, 1981, 187-page.
12. "omur kechir, gun kechir'. Bakı: Yazıchı, 1983, 246page.
13. "Borc." Bakı: Gənclik, 1984, 273page.
14. "eyilme, dunyam". Bakı: Yazıchı, 1985, 170-page.
15. "Seçilmiş eserleri." Bakı:Azerneshr 1989, 223-page.
16. "50-dən sonra". Bakı: Yazıchı, 1993, 132-page.
17. "karabagh faciesi" (publisistika). Bakı: Gandjlik, 1995, 320-page.
