= Jam-e Jam (newspaper) =

Iranian daily newspaper

- Type: Daily newspaper
- Owner: IRIB
- Publisher: IRIB
- Editor: Yousef Gharavi Ghochani
- Founded: March 29, 2000; 26 years ago
- Political alignment: Principlists
- Language: Persian
- Headquarters: Davoudieh, Mirdamad Boulevard, Tehran, Iran
- Circulation: 90,000 Daily (2015)
- ISSN: 1735-3637
- Website: jamejamonline.ir

Jam-e Jam (Persian: جام جم, Jâm-e Jam; "Cup of Jam") is a Persian language daily newspaper published in Iran.

== History and profile ==
Jam-e Jam had its first issue on 29 April 2000. It is published by Islamic Republic of Iran Broadcasting (IRIB), with a conservative bent and Mehdi Givehki is director of the newspaper. Panorama is one of its supplements and the first weekly English newspaper of the country.

The paper focuses on cultural and social news.

Based on the results of a domestic poll of how citizens of Tehran view television and print media which were released by Iran's Ministry of Culture and Islamic Guidance Jam-e Jam was read at 7.5% in March 2014.

== See also ==
- List of newspapers in Iran
