= Hamid Jebeli =

Iranian actor, writer, director, singer and art director

- حمید جبلی
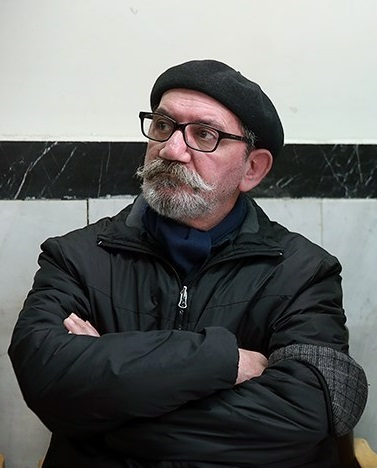
- In January 2017
- Born: October 2, 1958 (age 67); Tehran, Iran
- Occupations: Actor, voice actor, director, screenwriter
- Years active: 1978–present
- Relatives: Nasser Jebeli (father)

Hamid Jebelli or Hamid Jebeli (Persian: حمید جبلی; born October 2, 1958) is an Iranian stage and film actor, director, and voice actor.

== Life and career ==
He was born in Tehran, Iran. He has directed two films; Khab-e Sefid ('White Dream') and Pesar-e Maryam ('Son of Mary'). He is also the voice actor of Iranian famous puppet character, Kolah Ghermezi. His notable films as actor include Mother, Del Shodegan, Kolah Ghermezi and Pesar Khaleh, and Kolah Ghermezi and Bache Naneh.

== Awards ==
His film, Son of Maryam (1998) was chosen as the best film in Cairo Film Festival.
