= Kolah Ghermezi =

Fictional puppet character

- First appearance: Post Box (1992)
- Created by: Iraj Tahmasb; Hamid Jebelli; Marzieh Mahboob; Masoud Sadeghian Boroujeni
- Portrayed by: Donya Fannizadeh
- Voiced by: Hamid Jebelli

In-universe information
- Species: Human
- Gender: Male
- Occupation: Shoemaker; Ambulance; Driving Instructor; Student co-author
- Relatives: Pesar Khaleh; Pesar Ammeh Za; Bi Bi
- Nationality: Iranian

Kolah Ghermezi (Persian: کلاه‌قرمزی, lit. "The One with the Red Hat"), also known as Red Hat, is a fictional puppet character created by Iraj Tahmasb and Hamid Jebelli along with Marzieh Mahboob and Masoud Sadeghian Boroujeni. He has appeared in various television series and a number of theatrical films. The first TV program to feature the character was a 1995 episode of the children's puppet show Post Box (Persian:صندوق پست). Films based on this character have been among the best-selling in the history of Iranian cinema. For over two decades, the presence in Iranian cinema and television of Kolah Ghermezi has turned him from a doll to a cultural phenomenon that appeals to audiences across different generations, especially those of the 1360s (1980s).

Kolah Ghermezi is an orange-skinned humanoid with a bulbous nose and a red smile. He always wears a distinctive red hat, from which he received his name, along with a blue shirt and green pants. He has two different eye colors: one blue and the other green. He was originally characterized as a schoolboy who talked so quickly that he could not be easily understood, but this trait has been lessened throughout his media appearances.

Kolah Ghermezi from 2009, along with several other dolls in the form of the Nowruz (New Year's) Show, re-launched the TV series and became the most engaging program on the holiday that year. The special Nowruz Kolah Ghermezi program continues to the present day.

== Early life ==
There are two narratives in the life of Kolah Ghermezi and how his character was established: 1. Television series (not widely known) 2. The movie "Kolah Ghermezi and the Cousin" considerably more widely known.

In the first narrative, the character is a shoemaker who shows up as a guest in one of the episodes of children's series Post Box (sandoghe posti)'. He brings back the shoes which he has waxed of Mr. Morji (mis-pronounced version of "Mojri" meaning the Host of a show). The character is a playful, cheerful boy who mis-pronounces almost every word in a funny way. He constantly spits as he talks as well. Ultimately he stubbornly stays in the show and fixes his presence in the program.

The second narrative which is the most widely-known among the fans is depicted in the movie "Kolah Ghermezi and the Cousin" where he lives in a small town and has just been expelled from school. After trying different jobs (such as a driving instructor!), unsuccessful in all, he hears a voice by complete accident from a TV in the showcase of a TV store while walking in a street. Mr. Mojri lives in the capital, Tehran, and hosts a TV show for kids. One of the episodes is being aired when he walks by.

Hearing the soft, kind words of the host, Kolah decides to go to Tehran and try to become his co-host. He arrives but Mr. Mojri by no means needs a co-host especially a kid who cannot even talk properly. In a moment of disappointment, "The Cousin" who is the son of his maternal aunt - neither of whom ever became actual characters) shows up and tells him a story about an ant who never quits the job when taking a heavy seed to home, even if it is heavy and if he drops it many times he tries again. With the help of The Cousin and the girlfriend of Mr. Mojri who thinks Kolah is cute and has potential they finally convince Mr. Mojri to accept him and they become close friends.

== History ==
Kolah Ghermezi was originally an ant, used in the show "Wagtail and the wise Hoopoe" directed by Iraj Tahmasb in 1981 along with its creator, Massoud Sadeghian Boroujeni. Sadeghian also creates puppets for Hadi and Hoda, the School of Mice, and Aleson and Waleson shows for kids.

In 1993, a few years after the Wagtail and the wise Hoopoe, this puppet was pulled out of the archives once again for the show "Jeghjeghe o Ferfere" and turned into Kolah Ghermezi by some alterations by Marzieh Mahbub.

Initially the character was only supposed to be present as a guest in the show for a small bit part as a playful boy and a student, who did not know how to speak properly and constantly misspelling words. His part was about a guest that had brought Mr. Mojri his repaired shoes which he has waxed clean, but because of the excellent reception from the audience, he became a fixed character. Even the name of the show was changed to include his name.

Subsequently, the shape of the doll and its voice changed into its current incarnation. That program led to the Post Box program the following year. Other characters were then introduced, however, even though it had other dolls such as pears, julipoli, and others, the program was a cheerful treat that, with its playfulness, defamation, and even its innocent lies, could survive and even open the door to movies. The captain, originally a guest of the program slowly became a landlord. After changing the name of the program with the start of the new period in 2009, his return to television helped bring more families and even their animals from the village to the wider family.

=== Return ===
After years of being away he returned along with other dolls in the special program of Nowruz, in 2009. subsequently becoming the most prominent television program of that year. Since then, (except in 1389, 1395, and 1396, when the program was not made), the broadcast created great fanfare and popularity. For example, in the summer of 1391 it suddenly became commonplace that the character of the prohibited dragon has been shown, but was rejected the following year.

Some of the other characters in the series are: Mr. Hamsade (Mr. Neighbor), Famil e Dur (Far Family), Dure (Lady Far), Khanum Bozorg (Grandma), Dokhtar e Hamsaye (Neighbor Girl), Divi (Little Monster), Gabi (The Cow), Babayi (The Little Sheep), Jigar (Liver), Bebakhsid (Mr. Dear Please), Pesaramme Za (Cousin Za), Bache e Famil (Mr. Far Family's Kid) some of whom have become even more popular than Kolah Ghermezi himself.

== Attributes ==
=== Physical features ===
Kolah Ghermezi is a boy either eight or nine years old who wears a blue shirt with white horizontal lines. He always has a red hat, green pants, and red boots. One of his eyes is green and the other is blue. He also has black hair

=== Personality ===
Kolah Ghermezi is portrayed as a very honest and naive individual whose honesty is sometimes misinterpreted and gets him into trouble.

Apart from the changes that have been made in the puppet to this figure and its appearance over time, changes have also been made to the character of the Cricket. In addition to also having a speech impediment, he came forward and fastened himself to the sitter's head and stared at his eyes. In the same way, when he spoke his mouth unwittingly moved as the presenter who forced him to keep away from the axe. Over time, his personality grew up, his speech impediment gradually goes away and even his hangouts decrease.

The original puppeteer Donya Fannizadeh died on 8 January 2016 and died three months after the death of a cancer patient. He believed that the character in the 1390s was still the same as the 1370s, and only a more modern man. However, he believes he has made a huge difference over the past 20 years of his life. According to him, this character has grown up but has not lost his good qualities, only loing a series of behaviors that were specific to his childhood. For example, he now understands and can speak normal language, no longer needing his translator. He believed that he had learned in these years to speak well and control some of his behaviors.

He who still loves this character, like the first day of the romance, believes that despite the stability of the character of the helmet, however, due to the time and changing circumstances, given the fact that the sex of the copyrighted dialogues has been updated, he is also in the form of his eyesight to him This change is due to the fact that, in his opinion, many of those years are unknown to the child for today, and therefore, they are no longer in the form of a hijacker (the technical world of the dolls of the kolah Ghermezi of the eighth day of the 2016 died out of cancer due to Lost).

=== Puppet changes over time ===
Marzieh Mahboob, the designer of the Pulitzer Collection, says that since it is handmade with each hand made of each sponge piece, it is natural for them to change in time and by rebuilding the doll. He denies that the capricious personality becomes larger in time, and believes that dolls will never grow bigger or older. In the opinion of this doll, a doll would be created if the child was created to last until the child's life, and if he is born, he will be old at the end of his life. However, he believes that since all the senses and emotions of the doll maker are with these dolls And some of her life has been on their hands, maybe the helmet has grown despite its seemingly unchanged, and perhaps the creators of the character in the future will bring him to Sunni, who wants to marry. Nevertheless, he insists that it is our imagination that changes him, otherwise the physics and appearance of the doll will always remain the same.

It's about the reason why the new puppets are more similar to the helmet, even the distant family with that bald head and mustache, all of them from a tribe and neighborhood who may not have a relative blood relationship, but they say they are from one Ten have come. Ten Caps

== Movies ==
=== Kolah Ghermezi va Pesar Khaleh ===
Kolah Ghermezi va Pesar Khaleh (Red hat and the cousin) was the first film based on the character of the Cricketers. The film was released in 1994, and in the space of about three months, the average ticket price of 80 toman could reach 171 million tomans in Tehran. That is, taking into account the average ticket for 500 Toman in 2002, the price of the movie Kolah Ghermezi and Cousin cost about US$1 billion, and taking into account the ticket for 10,000 Iranian tomans in 1398, it is approximately 40 billion tomans, so this film can be viewed as the most popular and best-selling film in history. Therefore, it is said that this film, with inflation, is the best-selling film in the history of Iranian cinema.

=== Kolah Ghermezi va Sarvenaz ===
Kolah Ghermezi va Sarvenaz (Red hat and Sarvenaz) was the second feature film based on the captcha, which was released in 2002. It is said that with an average ticket price of 550 tomans, it managed to sell nearly 550 million tomans and become the bestselling movie of the year 2002.

=== Kolah Ghermezi va Bache Naneh ===
Kolah Ghermezi va Bache Naneh (Red hat and the spoilt kid) is the third feature film based on the captain's name, released on 27 August 2012. During the first two days of its opening in only 12 cinemas, it was able to sell 102 million tomans.

The bullet-proof film that was released simultaneously with the movie, sold nearly 5 million in 18 cinemas on the first day, and unscrupulously sold 9 million tomans in the first day in 19 cinemas. In the same period of the same movie (the first day of the show), Kolah Ghermezi and Bache Naneh sold 42 million tomans in the 9 cinemas that she sold. She was able to cross the border of 1 billion sales in 11 days after the show, and this was the only show in Tehran. And the statistics of cities were not yet clear. Many Iranian filmmakers predicted that this film would be the best-selling film of the year.

== Critics' Perspectives and Reasons for Popularity ==
The pre-poplice is popular among its audiences. The behind-the-scenes footage of this collection is the world-renowned Fengizadeh, the blindfold of this character. She is speaking behind the scenes with a helmet, caressing her, arranging her hair, and hanging her victims, which may seem odd to others. Fennizadeh, who was the first to introduce a hat-trick With the young child who today has reached the height of his youth, he feels more emotional, as if his child is not big, and his only temperament is more modern. He still loves a capricorner like in the 1370s and has a passion for turning it around the camera like the first days. He believes that the bullet is the strangest puppet personality that came from the very beginning without being asked to come and lasting. He says that apart from the audience's interest in the hacker, this personality is not very attractive for the program's creator, and he says that he is not only himself, but also the other producers of the program, including Iraj Tahmasb and Hamid Jebelli, who is also a survivor and is part of the program production group. He cites, for example, a quote from Iraj Tahmasb who says that this year he has a captcha when he asks him: "We need to have this program this year as well."

Many critics find it one of the reasons for the success of this collection and this character is a nostalgia. The critics say that the criticism is a generational nostalgia that has spent a significant part of his life on television, but there are critics who believe that this is not the only reason for the success of the series. Critics believe the success of this collection, if only because of memories, could never have been able to communicate well with other generations. Critics believe the continuation of a single set of success can not only be achieved by relying on nostalgia. In the opinion of these critics, the characters of this collection provide a suitable platform for the creation of social jokes and sometimes political ones. For example, a scene in the helmet, in which the auction is set up by dolls and in which the family is constantly in constant contact with the money launderers. The dollar demanded the price of its goods at the moment and in dollars.

"Criticism is a typical example of a boy who can be present in all generations," said critic Cinema Mohammad Hassan Saki, emphasizing that he's not just a character or a doll, but a cultural phenomenon. He is a mischievous, devil, lazy and lazy boy. There is no clear economic class. Features that allow him to move in between generations ... The bullet is not just a character; he's not just a doll, it's a cultural phenomenon. This can be greatly appreciated by the success and amount of its audience. "From this critic's point of view, the lifeblood is life-threatening and over time, an important point that may not be seen in other dolls, and even in itself, the presenter. The helmet is not a constant character; he has grown over time, so that he who initially could not speak properly and even drank his mouth when he spoke his mouth began to change and grew.

A journalist, Nikoo Sharifi, writes: "Perhaps the hijacker (whose replay began after more than a decade of interruption, started in Nowruz 1388), is the only television program that can be said to have the same size as the 90th program with the production and performance of Adel Ferdowsipur. The enormous amount of children and adults watching this program on TV and the Internet, and more importantly, those who just like this program from TV shows are evidence of that. "

Critics have different opinions about the reasons behind the success of this set. Mohammad Hassan Saki believes that this success is due to the proper use and updating of the prototype. He sees the relationship between the captain and the presenter according to the narrative, according to which the relationship between the mentor and the child is established between them. From his point of view, as the childbearer is misplaced and his professional masters say, the captain did not speak well especially in his early programs, and his words had to be rehearsed by the performer. From the perspective of this critic, they can be seen as an updated version of the Avestan and Black screenings. Black jokes and rejoicing over the patience and austerity of Avesta are somewhat repeated in the character of the choreographer and captain.

From the critics' point of view, the relation between the hypocrite and the presenter can also be known as a father-child relationship. As many of their children find themselves in criminals, the adults find themselves in the hands of the presenter, who is a kind, compassionate and patient father, which makes it a capricious audience not only for children, but also for adults. The relationship between these two is not the relationship between the teacher and the student, that is, the author does not advise the child and the children will accept it very soon, but the capricious and other puppet characters of this collection will not accept the words and the advice of the presenter and challenge him. The host sometimes takes greedily from the children, just like a true and true father-child relationship. From the viewpoint of these critics, although the haters do not speak politically, their words express the memories and even the sufferings of a generation. The Cinderella is a modern blessing that, in the language of humor and contemplation, tells the realities of the model of society; a symbol of Iranian humor, which is a talisman and continues to live.

However, since the beginning of the series, it has been widely criticized. Many critics accuse the program of not having expert and child professionals, which has made it possible for children to develop programs without regard to the cognitive needs of children, which, according to these critics, not only do not see this happen, but behaviors and speeches are fraught with wrong teachings. The speaker of the executive with dolls is full of violence, persistently defying and humiliating the children, decrees and rarely defines them. According to the critics, in this collection, children are constantly lying, playing, hiding something, doing false secret things and doing a lot of sweets, dirtying, or dying, and misunderstanding everything, making mistakes to work. (Which, in the opinion of these critics, is itself a wrong teaching to children). Other criticisms of this collection use characters from violent words and ask for large and disproportionate work with children's age, such as opening and washing and installing screens for home.

In the recent series of "Hacking", which will start and the number of characters will increase each year, the role of the active captain, whose name is the full name of the collection, has become weaker. This issue has been criticized for this collection. Nonetheless, the world's techno-scientist, fanfare fan from the beginning, believes that due to the multiplicity of characters, this is inevitable, and in any case, all puppets should be given the opportunity while the item's time is short.The personal taste of Fannizadeh about the program is to have a helmet in dual items appear against the actor, while preserving that nostalgic mood for the old audience, has a better chance of dialogue. Nevertheless, Iraj Tahmasb's view is that the "hijacker" is one of the few dolls that are present in most items, even if only a short dialogue is made.

== Cultural products and presence in popular culture ==
Kolah Ghermezi in Iran has become a brand that has been among children for many years as a member of the collective memory of Iranians, in addition to being in television and cinema, dolls and gadgets and toys. However, before returning to TV in 2009, it was still not a monopoly brand. This was the first time on Thursday, 18 October 2013 at the 27th Children and Youth Film Festival in Kosar Hotel of Dolls. The collection was officially unveiled.

Also, on the 15–21 October 2013, along with the children's network IRIB TV2 television series of the Iran, it was celebrating 20th birthday.

== Video games ==
A Running video game based on Kolah Ghermezi titled TEHRUN 2 was released for PC and Android.

Another Video game based on Kolah Ghermezi titled Kolah Ghermezi: Chocolate Dreams was developed by YC Groups and was released for PC in 2015.

== Appearances ==
=== TV shows ===
- kolah Ghermezi And Jeghjeghe And Ferfere – 1993
- Post Box – 1995
- World Children's Day and TV – 1995
- kolah Ghermezi and Presenter – 2003
- Kolah Ghermezi 88 – broadcast in Nowrouz of 2009 (1388 Solar Hijri)
- Kolah Ghermezi 90 – broadcast in Nowrouz of 2011 (1390 Solar Hijri)
- Kolah Ghermezi 91 – broadcast in Nowrouz of 2012 (1391 Solar Hijri)
- Kolah Ghermezi 92 – broadcast in Nowrouz of 2013 (1392 Solar Hijri)
- Kolah Ghermezi 93 – broadcast in Nowrouz of 2014 (1393 Solar Hijri)
- Kolah Ghermezi 94 – broadcast in Nowrouz of 2015 (1394 Solar Hijri)
- kolah Ghermezi 97 – broadcast in Nowrouz of 2018 (1397 solar Hijri)

=== Films ===
Three separate films were produced based on Kolah Ghermezi and his stories.

- Kolah Ghermezi and Pesar Khaleh (1995)
- Kolah Ghermezi and Sarvenaz (2002)
- Kolah Ghermezi and Bache Naneh (2012)

=== Home screen network ===
- kolah Ghermezi in Edge (2006)

== See also ==
- Howdy Doody
