= Iraj Tahmasb =

Iranian actor, director (born 1959)

- ایرج طهماسب
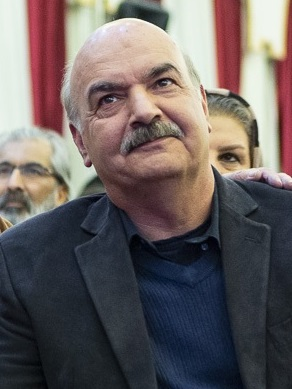
- Tahmasb in 2020
- Born: 21 May 1959 (age 67); Sanglaj Tehran, Iran
- Education: Dramatic Arts and Theater, College of Fine Arts, University of Tehran
- Occupations: Actor, screenwriter, director
- Years active: 1980–present
- Notable work: Kolah Ghermezi
- Spouse: Marjan Modarresi (m. 1983)
- Relatives: Naser Tahmasb (brother)

Iraj Tahmasb (Persian: ایرج طهماسب; born 21 May 1959) is an Iranian actor, screenwriter, and director of TV series and films. He is best known for co-creating of popular puppet character, Kolah Ghermezi.

== Personal Life and Family ==
Iraj Tahmasb is married to Marjan Madresi, a script supervisor. The couple has two daughters, Golnaz and Yasaman.

Tahmasb is also the brother of Nasser Tahmasb, a renowned actor, voice artist, and dubbing professional in Iranian cinema and television.

== Filmography ==
- Days of Waiting - 1987
- Kolah Ghermezi and Pesar Khaleh - 1994
- Once Upon a Time - 1999
- Kolah ghermezi and Sarvenaz - 2002
- The Pastry Girl - 2002
- Zir-e Derakht-e Holou - 2006
- Kolah Ghermezi 88 (TV series) - 2009
- Kolah Ghermezi 90 (TV series) - 2011
- Kolah Ghermezi 91 (TV series) - 2012
- Kolah Ghermezi and Bache Naneh - 2012
- Kolah Ghermezi 92 (TV series) - 2013
- Kolah Ghermezi 93 (TV series) - 2014
- Kolah Ghermezi 94 (TV series) - 2015
- Kolah Ghermezi 97 (TV series) - 2018
- Mehmouni (TV series) - 2022-2023
