= Jordan Shapiro =

American author (born 1977)

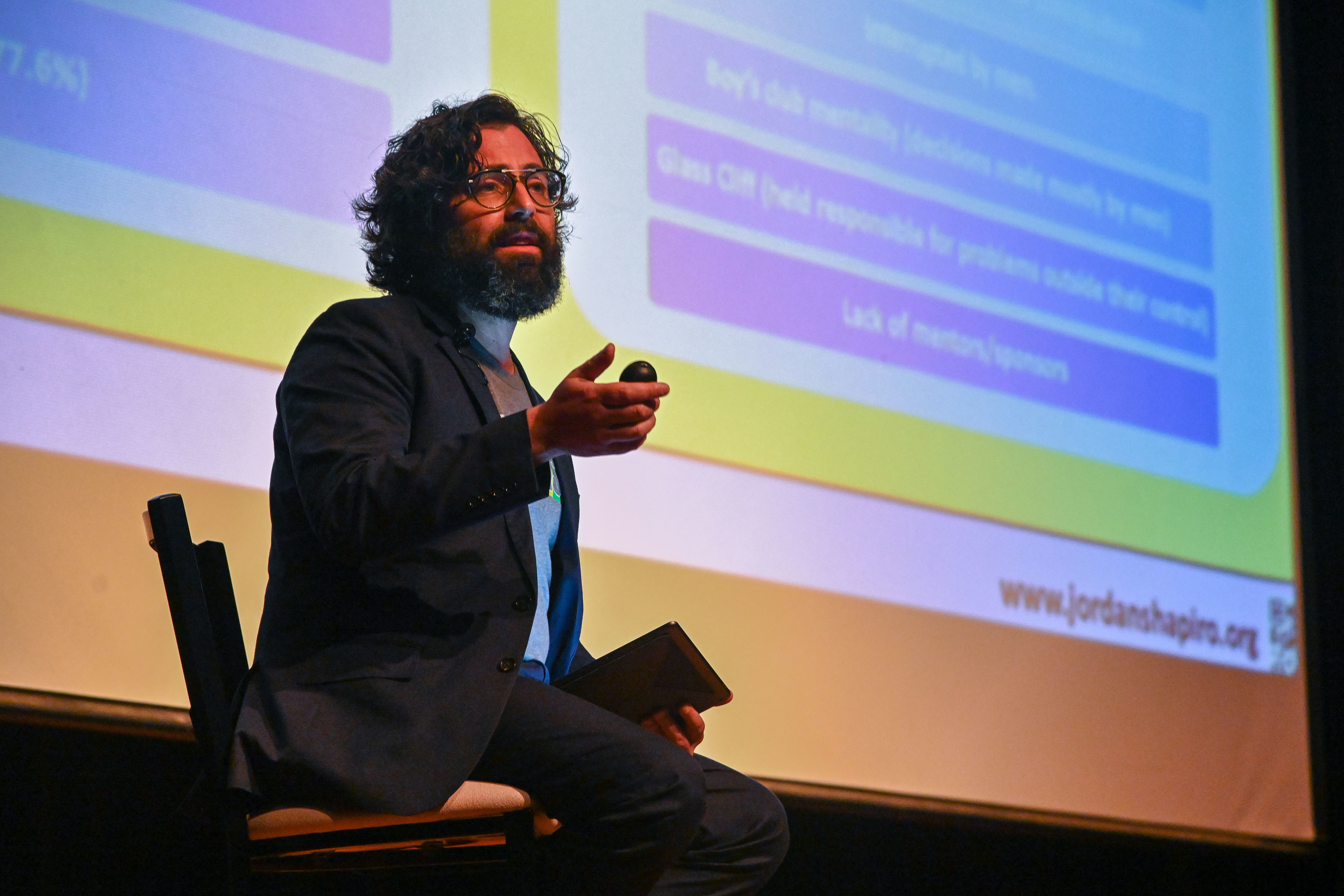
- Shapiro in 2022
- Born: November 15, 1977 (age 48); Philadelphia, Pennsylvania, U.S.
- Education: Bard College (BA), Pacifica Graduate Institute (MA) (PhD)
- Occupations: Professor, author
- Spouse: Amanda Steinberg
- Website: www.jordanshapiro.org

Jordan Shapiro (born November 15, 1977) is an American author known for his work on parenting, education, gender, and technology.

== Early life and education ==
Shapiro grew up in Philadelphia. He earned a B.A. from Bard College, an M.A. and a Ph.D. in depth psychology from Pacifica Graduate Institute. He studied phenomenology with Edward S. Casey, Rabbinic Judaism with Jacob Neusner, film & cinema with Adolfas Mekas.

== Career ==
Shapiro teaches philosophy at Temple University in the College of Liberal Arts. He is senior fellow at The Joan Ganz Cooney Center at Sesame Workshop, and a non-resident fellow at the Brookings Institution Center for Universal Education.

He became an expert in childhood development and digital play following his divorce, after playing video games with his two sons.

In 2021, he became core faculty in Temple University's Gender, Sexuality and Women's Studies program after researching and writing a book about being a feminist dad.

== Philosophy ==
Shapiro's perspective combines psychology, philosophy, and economics.

He argues against strict screen time limits for kids, suggesting instead that parents should teach their kids how to use digital devices with integrity. He advises parents not to panic about new technologies and encourages students to use social media in his Intellectual Heritage class. He advocates for joint media engagement. His view that kids can only learn good proper ethics for a connected world by spending more time with digital technology has been controversial, causing Wall Street Journal journalist Naomi Schaefer Riley to complain, "the idea that parents might forbid or severely limit their children's devices—or take the devices away altogether—is anathema to him". He hosts a podcast about digital wellbeing that is produced by Sesame Workshop and Roblox.

Shapiro's work on feminism and fatherhood has been well received. The New York Times Book Review called it "utterly mind-blowing". In 2022, United States Air Force four-star general Anthony J. Cotton celebrated Shapiro's views on masculinity and feminism, inviting him to be the keynote speaker at the Air Force Global Strike Command's Women's Leadership Symposium.

== Books ==
Father Figure: How to be a Feminist Dad ISBN 9780316459969 was published by Little, Brown Spark, an imprint of Little, Brown and Company in April 2021.

The New Childhood: Raising Kids to Thrive in a Connected World ISBN 0-316-43724-7 was published by Little, Brown Spark, an imprint of Little, Brown and Company in December 2018.

== Other writings ==
Shapiro wrote a column for Forbes called "Geek Philosophy" from 2012 to 2017.

He wrote "The Mindshift Guide to Games and Learning" for the online site of NPR member station KQED-FM. And the Asia Society Center for Global Education guide "Digital Play for Global Citizens".

In 2017, he coauthored a notable essay on education for global citizenship with former Prime Minister of Greece George Papandreou.
