= List of Wallykazam! episodes =

This is a complete list of the Nickelodeon CGI interactive animated series, Wallykazam!. The series was produced by Nickelodeon.

== Series overview ==
Season	Episodes	Originally released	
Season	Episodes	First released	Last released
1	26	February 3, 2014	April 16, 2015
2	26	May 8, 2015	September 16, 2017

== Episodes ==
=== Season 1 (2014–15) ===
No. overall	No. in season	Title	Directed by	Written by	Storyboard by	Original release date	US viewers (millions)
1	1	"Naptime for Borgelorp"	Beth Sleven	Adam Peltzman	Brian Hatfield and Rossen Varbanov	February 3, 2014	1.87
Wally agrees to babysit Ogre Doug's rambunctious pet, Borgelorp, but Ogre Doug warns Wally not to let him eat "Purple Flowers". If Borgelorp does eat Purple Flowers, something funny might happen to him.: Letter Concept: S; produced S words: Super, Soaring, Sandal, Somersault, Sock, Soar, Sand, Sandwich, Song, Soft, Stop, Symphony, Speak, Sing, Scream, Squawk; Opening Sequence: Flying on a Super Soaring Sandal.; "Whoo-ooh-ooh" Gag: Bobgoblin; Characters in Order of Appearance: Bobgoblin, Wally Trollman, Norville Trollman, Ogre Doug, Borgelorp, Gina, Libby; Ending Sequence: What a Letter!: "S"; Song: "Naptime for Borgelorp"; Guest Star: Jason Harris as Borgelorp and Sandwich
2	2	"Castle Caper"	Tom Mazzocco	Gabriel Pulliam	Joe Oh and Cynthia Petrovic	February 5, 2014	2.04
After Norville saves Wally's magic stick from a waterfall, Wally uses a magic word to build Norville a castle as a reward, then when Bobgoblin invades the castle, Wally, Norville and Gina Giant must get Bobgoblin out of the castle so Norville can get it back.: Letter Concept: C; Opening Sequence: Balancing on a Cup on a Can on a Clock and on a Camel named Carlos.; "Whoo-ooh-ooh" Gag: Bobgoblin; Characters in Order of Appearance: Wally Trollman, Norville Trollman, Bobgoblin, Gina Giant; Absent: Jorge Vega as Ogre Doug, Jenna Iacono as Libby Light Sprite; Produced C Words: Cup, Can, Clock, Camel, Carlos, Castle, Couches, Carpets, Crown, Cake, Costume, Catapult, Cushions; Ending Sequence: Giant Words with Gina Giant: "Ridiculous"; Song: "My Friend The King" which first aired as a standalone segment 2 September 2017; Stolen: Norville's Castle; Guest Stars: Dan Bittner as Green Ben and Jim Nolan as Cow; Note: The word king was also made but it started with K. C and K both make the same sound.
3	3	"The Rock Can Talk"	Beth Sleven	Tim McKeon	Brian Hatfield and Rossen Varbanov	February 7, 2014	1.64
Rockelle, a large rock that Wally brings to life by his magic, leads him and Norville to a treasure hunt to the Top of the Peak so they can find "The Really, Really, Really Big Treasure".: Letter Concept: T; Opening Sequence: Sitting on Top of a Tall Tree.; "Whoo-ooh-ooh" Gag: Bobgoblin; Characters in Order of Appearance: Wally Trollman, Norville Trollman, Bobgoblin, Rockelle; Absent: Taliyah Whitaker as Gina Giant, Jorge Vega as Ogre Doug, Jenna Iacono as Libby Light Sprite; Produced T Words: Tall, Tree, Tuba, Trampoline, Talk, Tube, Toboggan, Tires, Tunnel, Taffy, Top, Tumble, Turn, Toss; Ending Sequence: A Word from Bobgoblin: "–et"; Song: "What The Treasure Could Be"; Stolen: The 3 Times Really Big Treasure; Guest Star: Vanessa Bayer as Rockelle
4	4	"How to Bathe Your Dragon"	Eric Fogel	Adam Peltzman	Scott Cooper and Julia "Fitzy" Fitzmaurice	February 10, 2014	N/A
Wally encourages Norville to take a bath during Gina's party, but Bobgoblin steals the Letter "B" just because it starts with his name.: Letter Concept: B; Opening Sequence: Seeing a Banana ride a Bicycle.; "Whoo-ooh-ooh" Gag: Libby Light Sprite; Characters in Order of Appearance: Bobgoblin, Wally Trollman, Norville Trollman, Gina Giant, Libby Light Sprite, Ogre Doug; Produced B Words: Banana, Bicycle, Big, Bump, Burp, Bounce, Bathtub, Band, Bubbles, Balloons; Ending Sequence: A Light Sprite Can Write!; Song: "Dragon Bath Party"; Stolen: The Magic B; Guest Star: Dan Bittner as Ball
5	5	"Dragon Hiccups"	Tom Mazzocco	Sascha Paladino	Joe Oh and Cynthia Petrovic	February 12, 2014	1.77
Wally needs help to find all the ingredients so he can mix up a magic potion to stop Norville's hiccups.: Letter Concept: ---ash; Opening Sequence: Having a Sash Bash that Flashes.; "Whoo-ooh-ooh" Gag: Ogre Doug; Characters in Order of Appearance: Wally Trollman, Norville Trollman, Bobgoblin, Ogre Doug, Gina Giant, Stan of the Swamp (debut); Absent: Jenna Iacono as Libby Light Sprite; Produced ---ash Words: Sash, Bash, Flash, Splash, Crash, Mash, Tash, Dash, Trash; Ending Sequence: Ode to a Creature: "The Blathertash Song" (a lot of the words have "–ash"-ending words.); Song: "We Must Have Mud"; Guest Stars: J.R. Horne as Stan of the Swamp, Fran Brill as List Text and Lightning Snail, and Adam Peltzman as Slow Snail, Goose, and Blathertash
6	6	"Picnic: Impossible"	Eric Fogel	Gabriel Pulliam	Scott Cooper and Julia "Fitzy" Fitzmaurice	February 19, 2014	N/A
When a rainstorm ruins Gina's picnic, the viewer, Wally, and his friends prepare a giant surprise picnic inside Gina Giant's house for Gina to cheer her up.: Letter Concept: H; Opening Sequence: Hopping on a Hopping Hamburger; "Whoo-ooh-ooh" Gag: Gina Giant; Characters in Order of Appearance: Wally Trollman, Norville Trollman, Gina Giant, Libby Light Sprite, Ogre Doug; Absent: Aria Capria as Bobgoblin; Produced H Words: Hopping, Hamburger, High, Home, Hats, Hop, Hose, Halt, Hang-gliders, Hooks, Hiccup, Hush, Hurry, Hide; Ending Sequence: Howl like the Vowel short A sound; Song: "Picnic Time"; Guest Star: Adam Peltzman as Cuckoo Clock; Note: The episode's title is based on Mission: Impossible.
7	7	"Totally Swamped"	Beth Sleven	Bradley Zweig	Brian Hatfield and Rossen Varbanov	February 21, 2014	N/A
When Wally's Glider lands in Stan's Swamp, Stan challenges Wally to get his glider back after he'll make Stan laugh. It is not an easy task at all, because he never laughed, smiled, and even giggled.: Letter Concept: M; Opening Sequence: Sitting on a Marshmallow Mountain; "Whoo-ooh-ooh" Gag: Ogre Doug; Characters in Order of Appearance: Wally Trollman, Norville Trollman, Stan of the Swamp, Ogre Doug, Gina Giant; Absent: Aria Capria as Bobgoblin, Jenna Iacono as Libby Light Sprite; Produced M Words: Marshmallow, Mountain, Milk, Mud, Mustache, Mumble, Monkey, Moo, Mop, Maracas, Muffins, Mops, Music, Move, Mirror, Mouth, Mad, Merry, Muffin; Ending Sequence: What a Letter!; Song: "Silly Dance Show"; Stolen (And given back): Wally's Glider, Ogre Doug's Book, Gina Giant's Froggy Long Legs; Guest Stars: Adam Peltzman as Mumble Monkey and Dan Bittner as Marvin the Mouth; Return Appearance: J.R. Horne as Stan of the Swamp
8	8	"Day in the Dark"	Tom Mazzocco	Adam Peltzman	Emmanuel Deligiannis, Chong Suk Lee and Cynthia Petrovic	March 19, 2014	1.94
When Norville loses his favorite toy, Squeaky Cyclops, Wally, Norville, Ogre Doug and Libby Light Sprite set out to retrieve Norville's toy that has been taken by a female Night Dragon, as Norville to face his fears of the dark.: Letter Concept: D; Opening Sequence: Seeing a Daisy Dance on Norville.; "Whoo-ooh-ooh" Gag: Libby Light Sprite; Characters in Order of Appearance: Wally Trollman, Norville Trollman, Bobgoblin, Night Dragon (debut), Ogre Doug, Libby Light Sprite; Absent: Taliyah Whitaker as Gina Giant; Produced D Words: Dancing, Daisy, Dragon, Disappear, Dark, Doughnut, Dozen, Doughnuts, Doorbell, Drums, Dash, Daylight; Ending Sequence: A Word from Bobgoblin: "–at"; Song: "Bark In The Dark"; Guest Stars: Gregory Abbey as Fruzzlewuzzle and Snorblemonster, Emily Bauer as Night Dragon, Thomas Langston as Cat, and Dan Bittner as Rat
9	9	"The Great Wishing Potato"	Eric Fogel	Tim McKeon	Scott Cooper, Emmanuel Deligiannis and Julia "Fitzy" Fitzmaurice	March 21, 2014	1.64
When Libby Light Sprite loses her voice before her concert, Bobgoblin suggests that the only way to bring her voice back, is by wishing her voice by "The Great Wishing Potato".: Letter Concept: Sh---; Opening Sequence: Seeing a Shovel Show.; "Whoo-ooh-ooh" Gag: Libby Light Sprite; Characters in Order of Appearance: Bobgoblin, Wally Trollman, Norville Trollman, Libby Light Sprite, Goblin Guard (debut); Absent: Taliyah Whitaker as Gina Giant, Jorge Vega as Ogre Doug; Produced Sh--- Words: Shovel, Show, Shiny, Shoes, Shush, Short, Shed, Shields, Shirt, Shrimp, Shower, Shampoo, Shake, Shout; Ending Sequence: A Word from Bobgoblin: "–ell"; Song: "Shake And Shout"; Guest Stars: (voiced by Chris Phillips) as Goblin Guard and Dan Bittner as Shell
10	10	"Running Rita"	Beth Sleven	Clark Stubbs	Emmanuel Deligiannis, Brian Hatfield and Rossen Varbanov	April 22, 2014	1.78
When a magic word makes Gina Giant's new doll run away, she and Wally set off to save her, while Norville looks after Gina's dolls at a welcome party for Gina's new doll.: Letter Concept: R; Opening Sequence: Having a Robot Race.; "Whoo-ooh-ooh" Gag: Gina Giant; Characters in Order of Appearance: Wally Trollman, Norville Trollman, Gina Giant; Absent: Aria Capria as Bobgoblin, Jorge Vega as Ogre Doug, Jenna Iacono as Libby Light Sprite; Produced R Words: Racetrack, Rollerbot, Rocketbot, Ribbon, Radish, Run, Raisin, Ramp, Roll, Rope, Rise, Red, Rocket, Rest; Ending Sequence: Giant Words with Gina Giant: "Adorable"; Song: "Get Running Rita!"; Guest Stars: Taliyah Whitaker as Squirrel, Adam Peltzman as Rocketbot and Rollerbot, and Thomas Langston as Turtle
11	11	"The Cake Monster"	Tom Mazzocco	Scott Gray	Chong Suk Lee and Cynthia Petrovic	April 24, 2014	1.86
When a Cake Monster steals Ogre Doug's delicious cake, Wally and Norville set out to retrieve it. Then they discover that the Cake Monster's birthday is the same day on Ogre Doug's birthday.: Letter Concept: F; Opening Sequence: Playing with a Furry Football.; "Whoo-ooh-ooh" Gag: Ogre Doug; Characters in Order of Appearance: Wally Trollman, Norville Trollman, Ogre Doug, Borgelorp, Gina Giant, Libby Light Sprite, Barbara Baker (debut), Cake Monster (debut); Absent: Aria Capria as Bobgoblin; Produced F Words: Furry, Football, Feet, Forks, French, Fries, Feathers, Freeze, Fly, Fetch, Fort, Fast; Ending Sequence: A Light Sprite Can Write: "Fly"; Song: "The Birthday Song"; Stolen: Ogre Doug's Cake; Guest Stars: (voiced by Chris Phillips) as Cake Monster and Stephanie D'Abruzzo as Barbara Baker; Note: This episode features 2 debuts of Ogre Doug's New Friend (at the end), Cake Monster and Barbara Baker.
12	12	"Great Galloping Goblins"	Eric Fogel	Joe Matthews	Scott Cooper, Emmanuel Deligiannis and Jean-Sebastien Duclos	May 13, 2014	1.35
When Wally accidentally uses the word "gallop" on his house, it grows legs and runs away. Meanwhile, Bobgoblin becomes a bandit and rides on the house like a horse. Wally, Norville, Libby Light Sprite and Ogre Doug set out to stop him from riding a house.: Letter Concept: G; Opening Sequence: Watering the Gift Garden.; "Whoo-ooh-ooh" Gag: Bobgoblin; Characters in Order of Appearance: Bobgoblin/Bandit Bobgoblin, Wally Trollman, Norville Trollman, Libby Light Sprite, Ogre Doug; Absent: Taliyah Whitaker as Gina Giant; Produced G Words: Gift, Garden, Gallop, Giggle, Gate, Gargantuan, Ghost, Go, Glide, Gold, Glue, Gone; Ending Sequence: Howl like the Vowel: "E"; Song: "It's Good to Be the Good Guys"; Stolen: Wally and Norville's House; Guest Star: Adam Peltzman as Ghost
13	13	"Victor the Villain"	Beth Sleven	Bradley Zweig	Emmanuel Deligiannis, Brian Hatfield and Rossen Varbanov	May 15, 2014	N/A
While they are playing superheroes, Wally uses a magic word to conjure a villain named "Victor the Villian" so they can have a Super Villain to play with in superheroes. But when Victor the Villian starts causing trouble like taking Ogre Doug's chocolate ice cream cone and Gina Giant's doll, Mighty Troll and Wonder Dragon must stop him.: Letter Concept: V; Opening Sequence: Playing Viking Volleyball.; "Whoo-ooh-ooh" Gag: Gina Giant; Characters in Order of Appearance: Wally Trollman/Mighty Troll, Norville Trollman/Wonder Dragon, Bobgoblin/Badgoblin, Victor the Villain, Ogre Doug, Gina Giant; Absent: Jenna Iacono as Libby Light Sprite; Produced V Words: Volleyball, Viking, Vegetables, Villain, Vanilla, Vine, Very, Vanish, Vacuum; Ending Sequence: Giant Words with Gina Giant: "Imitate"; Song: "Wonder Dragon and Mighty Troll"; Stolen: Too many to name; Guest Stars: John O’Hurley as Victor the Villain and Jason Harris as Monkey
14	14	"Snow Place Like Home"	Tom Mazzocco	Sascha Paladino	Chong Suk Lee and Cynthia Petrovic	June 10, 2014	1.87
When Norville discovers a Baby Dragon near their house, Wally and Norville set out to The Top of Mount Chilomanjaro to bring him back to his mother.: Letter Concept: W; Opening Sequence: Cheering for Wally's Favorite Letter, "W".; "Whoo-ooh-ooh" Gag: Ogre Doug; Characters in Order of Appearance: Wally Trollman, Norville Trollman, Mother Snow Dragon (debut), Baby Snow Dragon (debut), Stan of the Swamp, Ogre Doug, Betty Yeti (debut); Absent: Aria Capria as Bobgoblin, Taliyah Whitaker as Gina Giant, Jenna Iacono as Libby Light Sprite; Produced W Words: Wally, Wild, Wacky, Whoops, Whoa, Wonderful, Wig, Water, Wait, Web, Waffles, Wings, Wiggle, Wobble, Whirl; Ending Sequence: What a Letter!: "W"; Song: "That's Awesome"; Guest Stars: Andie Mechanic as Betty Yeti, Oliver Wyman) as Baby Dragon, and Koyalee Chanada as Mama Dragon; Return Appearance: J.R. Horne as Stan of the Swamp; Note: This episode features the debut of Wally's Yeti Friend, Betty the Yeti. Mount Chilomanjaro is a parody of Mount Kilimanjaro.
15	15	"The Switching Stone"	Eric Fogel	Randi Barnes	Scott Cooper and Jean-Sebastien Duclos	June 12, 2014	2.26
When Norville discovers a stone that can glow, Wally and Gina change sizes when they touch a stone. Then Bobgoblin dubs himself "Biggoblin" after he switches sizes with Wally.: Letter Concept: P; Opening Sequence: Putting on a Puppet Play.; "Whoo-ooh-ooh" Gag: Gina Giant; Characters in Order of Appearance: Wally Trollman, Norville Trollman, Bobgoblin/Biggoblin, Gina Giant; Absent: Jorge Vega as Ogre Doug, Jenna Iacono as Libby Light Sprite; Produced P Words: Puppet, Play, Pizza, Pail, Pouch, Pit, Pebbles, Pickle, Pile, Popcorn, Propeller, Parachute; Ending Sequence: Wallykazhymes (featuring Bobgoblin); Song: "Giant Problem In Your House"; Stolen: The Switching Stone
16	16	"Play it Again, Stan"	Beth Sleven	Bradley Zweig	Emmanuel Deligiannis and Brian Hatfield	August 26, 2014	N/A
Wally and his friends teach Stan of the Swamp how to play before his 4 year old niece Marsha of the Marsh visits.: Letter Concept: Tr---; Opening Sequence: Trying to Trick the Tricky Tricycle.; "Whoo-ooh-ooh" Gag: Gina Giant; Characters in Order of Appearance: Wally Trollman, Norville Trollman, Stan of the Swamp, Marsha of the Marsh, Gina Giant, Ogre Doug (cameo); Absent: Aria Capria as Bobgoblin, Jenna Iacono as Libby Light Sprite; Produced Tr--- Words: Tricky, Tricycle, Triangles, Treat, Truck, Trucks, Trampoline, Trail, Trunk, Trap, Train, Tracks, Tremendous; Ending Sequence: Ode to a Creature; Guest Stars: Ripley Sobo as Marsha of the Marsh and Koyalee Chanada as Flibberflug; Return Appearances: Fran Brill as Lightning Snail and J.R. Horne as Stan of the Swamp
17	17	"A Tiny Problem"	Tom Mazzocco	Scott Gray	Chong Suk Lee and Cynthia Petrovic	August 28, 2014	N/A
When Libby Light Sprite discovers a "Flower that will Shrink You", Wally and Norville accidentally shrunk themselves. Then Wally and Norville encounter a Whittle named "Wendy" who can lead them on a Quest to find "The Berry that makes you big again".: Letter Concept: Sp---; Opening Sequence: Questioning the Speaking Spoon to See what He likes to Do.; "Whoo-ooh-ooh" Gag: Libby Light Sprite; Characters in Order of Appearance: Wally Trollman, Norville Trollman, Libby Light Sprite, Wendy Whittle; Absent: Aria Capria as Bobgoblin, Taliyah Whitaker as Gina Giant, Jorge Vega as Ogre Doug; Produced Sp--- Words: Speaking, Spoon, Spin, Sparkle, Space, Spaghetti, Spotlight, Speed, Sponge, Springs, Splat; Ending Sequence: A Light Sprite Can Write; Stolen: The Berry That Makes You Big Again; Guest Stars: Pheobe Golfinos as Wendy Whittle and Gregory Abbey as Flipmunk and Spoon
18	18	"Castle Cafe"	Eric Fogel	Adam Peltzman	Scott Cooper, Jean-Sebastien Duclos and Matt Engstrom	September 30, 2014	N/A
Wally and his friends transform a pretend cafe into a real cafe, when Wally rings the bell saying "Lunch is ready at Wally's Castle Cafe", and his friends come over.: Letter Concept: Ch---; Opening Sequence: Seeing a Cheering Chimp Cheer.; "Whoo-ooh-ooh" Gag: Bobgoblin; Characters in Order of Appearance: Wally Trollman, Norville Trollman, Bobgoblin, Libby Light Sprite, Gina Giant, Ogre Doug, Borgelorp, Betty Yeti, Stan of the Swamp, Cake Monster (In The Alphabet Song), Baby Snow Dragon (In The Alphabet Song), Victor the Villain (In The Alphabet Song); Ch--- food items on the menu: Cherries, Chili, Cheeseburger, Chocolate River through Marshmallow Mountain; Produced Ch--- Words: Cheering, Chimp, Cheese, Chair, Cherries, Chalkboard, Chalk, Change, Chili, Cheeseburger, Checkers, Cha–Cha, Cheesecake, Chocolate; Ending Sequence: The Alphabet Song; Stolen: Norville's Dragon Surprise; Return Appearances: J.R. Horne as Stan of the Swamp, Andie Mechanic as Betty Yeti, Jason Harris as Cheering Chimp and Borgelorp, (voiced by Chris Phillips) as Cake Monster, Oliver Wyman) as Baby Dragon, and John O’Hurley as Victor the Villain
19	19	"The Dragon Games"	Brian Hatfield and Beth Sleven	Dustin Ferrer	Brian Hatfield and Rossen Varbanov	October 1, 2014	N/A
Norville competes in the Dragon Games, but Bobgoblin pretends to be a dragon to win the contest.: Letter Concept: J; Opening Sequence: Having a Jam Jamboree.; "Whoo-ooh-ooh" Gag: Bobgoblin; Characters in Order of Appearance: Wally Trollman, Norville Trollman, Bobgoblin, Ogre Doug, Gina Giant, Night Dragon, Baby Snow Dragon; Absent: Jenna Iacono as Libby Light Sprite; Produced J Words: Jars, Jam, Jamboree, Jiggle, Jump, Juice, Jukebox, Jumbo, Jetpack; Ending Sequence: Wallykazhymes; Guest Stars: Emily Bauer, Oliver Wyman), and Dan Bittner as Jars of Jam; Return Appearances: Emily Bauer as Night Dragon and Oliver Wyman) as Baby Dragon
20	20	"Mustache Day"	Eric Fogel	Adam Peltzman	Scott Cooper and Jean-Sebastien Duclos	October 28, 2014	N/A
During Mustache Day, Wally, Norville and Libby Light Sprite discover a Tremendous Treat at Wizard Jeff's House. Wizard Jeff challenges Wally and his Friends to get the Tremendous Treat before it turns into underpants.: Letter Concept: short A sounds ---a---; Opening Sequence: Seeing a Black Cat.; "Whoo-ooh-ooh" Gag: Bobgoblin; Characters in Order of Appearance: Wally Trollman, Norville Trollman, Bobgoblin, Barbara Baker, Libby Light Sprite, Wizard Jeff (debut); Absent: Taliyah Whitaker as Gina Giant, Jorge Vega as Ogre Doug; Produced ---a--- Words: Black, Cat, Tap, Fast, Flat, Catch, Bat, Nap; Ending Sequence: A Message for Dragons; Guest Stars: "Weird Al" Yankovic as Wizard Jeff, Stephanie D'Abruzzo as Cat, and Dan Bittner as Bat and Mustache; Return Appearance: Stephanie D'Abruzzo as Barbara Baker; Note: This episode features the debut of Wally's Wizard Friend, Wizard Jeff (which is voiced by "Weird Al" Yankovic). Mustache Day is a parody of Halloween.
21	21	"Wally Saves the Trollidays"	Tom Mazzocco	Adam Peltzman	Chong Suk Lee, Cynthia Petrovic and Daniel Schier	December 5, 2014	N/A
When Wally and Norville encounter an Elf name Elfelfa who's having trouble delivering a sack of wishes to the Jingle Troll, Wally and Norville Decide to Help her deliver the sack of wishes to the Jingle Troll before the Trollidays begin. But when Bobgoblin steals the sack of wishes, Wally, Norville, the viewer, and Elfelfa must get it back.: Letter Concept: L; Opening Sequence: Reading Norville a Story called "A Little Book About the Trollidays".; "Whoo-ooh-ooh" Gag: Jingle Troll; Characters in Order of Appearance: Bobgoblin, Wally Trollman, Norville Trollman, Gina Giant, Ogre Doug, Libby Light Sprite, Betty Yeti, Elfelfa, Jingle Troll; Produced L Words: Loud, Little, Large, Leap, Lasso, Lift, Lazy, Lyrics, Launch, Listen, Lights, Love; Ending Sequence: What a Letter; Stolen: The Sack Of Wishes; Guest Stars: Tony Bennett as Bobgoblin’s singing voice, Kate Micucci as Elfelfa, and (voiced by Chris Phillips) as Rotten Tomato and Jingle Troll; Return Appearance: Andie Mechanic as Betty Yeti; Note: The Trollidays is a parody of Christmas. The Jingle Troll is a parody of Santa Claus.
22–23	22–23	"The Big Goblin Problem"	Eric Fogel, Brian Hatfield and Beth Sleven	Scott Gray and Adam Peltzman	Ron Brewer, Scott Cooper, Matt Engstrom, Julia "Fitzy" Fitzmaurice, Joe Oh and Rossen Varbanov	February 6, 2015	1.24
Wally's uncle Steve the Skydasher arrives with his dragon Victoria who Norville likes. As Steve and Victoria leave to rescue George the Elf, Bobgoblin gets ahold of doubling bubbles which belongs to Steve and has himself a clone dance party.: Letter Concept: S; Opening Sequence: Saving Froggy Long Legs with Dragon Riding Moves.; "Whoo-ooh-ooh" Gag: Bobgoblin; Characters in Order of Appearance: Bobgoblin, Wally Trollman, Norville Trollman, Gina Giant, Skydasher Steve Trollman (debut), Victoria Trollman (debut), Libby Light Sprite, Ogre Doug, Stan of the Swamp, Barbara Baker; Produced S Words: Part 1: Super, Soft, Sofa, Song, Snacks, Sing, Soar: Part 2: Sounds, Stinky, Sock, Stupendous, Silly, Single: Ending Sequence: None; Stolen: Trouble Bubbles (first part only); Guest Stars: Ben Schwartz as Skydasher Steve and Vanessa Lemonides as Victoria; Return Appearances: J.R. Horne as Stan of the Swamp, Stephanie D'Abruzzo as Barbara Baker, and Koyalee Chanada as Flibberflug; Note: This is a one-hour special of Wallykazam and This episode features Bobgoblin as the hero and the debut of Wally's Uncle, Skydasher Steve Trollman and his Dragon Victoria.
24	24	"Hopgoblin"	Tom Mazzocco	Scott Gray	Ron Brewer, Chong Suk Lee and Cynthia Petrovic	April 3, 2015	N/A
Hattie turns Bobgoblin into a bunny and is Bunnygoblin after he flies away on Hattie the Witch's broomstick without asking. Wally, Norville and Ogre Doug must go to Hattie the Witch's house to get her to change Bobgoblin back. If she doesn't change Bobgoblin back by sunset, he will be a bunny permanently.: Letter Concept: Sl---; Opening Sequence: Sliding on a Slope with Sliding Slippers; "Whoo-ooh-ooh" Gag: Ogre Doug; Characters in Order of Appearance: Wally Trollman, Norville Trollman, Bobgoblin, Hattie the Witch (debut), Ogre Doug; Absent: Taliyah Whitaker as Gina Giant, Jenna Iacono as Libby Light Sprite; Produced Sl--- Words: Sliding, Slippers, Slope, Slip, Slow, Sleep, Slide, Slingshot; Ending Sequence: Ode to a Creature; Guest Stars: Kyla Carter as Hattie the Witch and Jason Harris as Chad Winklesnad and Dad Winklesnad; Note: This episode features the debut of Bobgoblin's Witch Friend, Hattie the Witch.
25	25	"The Explorers Club"	Tom Mazzocco	Jim Nolan	Cynthia Petrovic and Dan Schier	April 14, 2015	N/A
Wally and Ogre Doug form a club for explorers to find a rare chickephant (a hybrid of a chicken and an elephant). Then, Hattie the Witch starts a rival club with Bobgoblin.: Letter Concept: Cl---; Opening Sequence: Clowning Around.; "Whoo-ooh-ooh" Gag: Ogre Doug; Characters in Order of Appearance: Wally Trollman, Norville Trollman, Bobgoblin, Hattie the Witch, Orge Doug, Chickenphant (debut); Absent: Taliyah Whitaker as Gina Giant, Jenna Iacono as Libby Light Sprite; Produced Cl--- Words: Clowns, Clumsy, Clean, Clubhouse, Cloth, Clue, Climb, Cluck; Ending Sequence: Wallykazhymes; Guest Stars: Vanessa Lemonides as Chickephant and Trevor James Hamill as Frog; Return Appearance: Kyla Carter as Hattie the Witch
26	26	"Mission for Mom"	Brian Hatfield and Beth Sleven	Jim Nolan	Brian Hatfield and Rossen Varbanov	May 8, 2015	N/A
Wally goes to get his mom, Linda, her favorite flower for Mother's Day, with the Help from Libby Light Sprite.: Letter Concept: ---op; Opening Sequence: Selling Mops and Tops with a Shop; "Whoo-ooh-ooh" Gag: Libby Light Sprite; Characters in Order of Appearance: Wally Trollman, Norville Trollman, Libby Light Sprite, Linda Trollman (debut); Absent: Aria Capria as Bobgoblin, Taliyah Whitaker as Gina Giant, Jorge Vega as Ogre Doug; Produced ---op Words: Mop, Top, Shop, Hop, Chop, Pop, Stop, Drop; Ending Sequence: A Light Sprite Can Write; Guest Stars: Alanna Ubach as Linda Trollman, Jason Harris as Wild Borgelorps, and Jeff Gurner and Diana Preisler as Singing Shrubs; Note: This episode features the debut of Wally's Mother, Mrs. Trollman (Linda Trollman).

=== Season 2 (2015–17) ===
No. overall	No. in season	Title	Directed by	Written by	Storyboard by	Original release date	US viewers (millions)
27	1	"The Nice Ninjas"	Eric Fogel	Adam Peltzman	Clint Bond, Ron Brewer and David Van Tuyle	April 16, 2015	1.08
Wally conjures up Nancy the Naughty Noodle and he and Norville must test their newly acquired ninja skills against her. She escapes, "spaghetting out of here", due to her nimbleness, and jumps on Gina Giant's head after messing up her dollhouse, which Wally neatens using his magic stick. Nancy taunts them, causing Wally to try and make her nice. But Nancy nimbly dodges taunting "hasta la pasta" at them. Bobgoblin helps Nancy find a new hiding place in a castle which she dubs the pasta palace. Bobgoblin is bribed with bow-tie pasta to help her set traps for the ninja. Wally tries to out-nimble the "sneaky fettuccine" while Bobgoblin fortifies the place al dente and Bobgoblin sounds a ziti horn to celebrate. He is later distracted by an awooga noise, allowing the ninjas to sneak up on Nancy as she reads a book. Bobgoblin guards Nancy with ravioli launchers but the catapult is netted. After changing a giant meatball into a nut, Bobgoblin self sacrifices himself to protect Nancy from another "nice" spell. Nancy is reduced to tears when the ninjas capture her and plot to rewrite her personality.: Letter Concept: N; Opening Sequence: Guessing what Day it is and It is "The Letter N Day" because all of the Magic Words began with the Letter N.; "Whoo-ooh-ooh" Gag: Wally and Norville Trollman; Characters in Order of Appearance: Nice Ninja Wally Trollman, Nice Ninja Norville Trollman, Bobgoblin, Ogre Doug, Nancy the Naughty Noodle, Gina Giant, Libby Light Sprite (In The Wally, Wally, Wally song); Produced N Words: Norville, Nut, Napkin, Note, Number, Neighbor, Ninjas, Nest, Noodle, Night, Naughty, Nacho, Nose, Neat, Nice, Noise, Net, Normal; Ending Sequence: Wally spelling his name and singing the credits song. Wally, Wally, Wally; Guest Star: Kerry Butler as Nancy the Noodle
28	2	"Home Swamp Home"	Brian Hatfield	Scott Gray	Clint Bond, Dan Schier and David Van Tuyle	May 18, 2015	1.00
When Honkweeds invade Stan's swamp, he, Wally, and Libby Light Sprite search for a humbug that makes the humming of a Humbug make the Honkweeds go away and never ever come back.: Letter Concept: G; Opening Sequence: Playing a Goofy Game; "Whoo-ooh-ooh" Gag: Libby Light Sprite; Characters in Order of Appearance: Wally Trollman, Norville Trollman, Bobgoblin, Libby Light Sprite, Stan of the Swamp, Humphrey the Humbug, Cake Monster (In The Alphabet Song), Gina Giant (In The Alphabet Song), Betty Yeti (In The Alphabet Song), Baby Snow Dragon (In The Alphabet Song), Ogre Doug (In The Alphabet Song), Victor the Villain (In The Alphabet Song); Produced G Words: Goofy, Game, Goblin, Gone, Green, Gunk, Goo, Grumpy, Guitar; Ending Sequence: The Alphabet Song; Guest Stars: Ben Folds as The Humbug and Bob Ari as Stan of the Swamp’s singing voice; Return Appearances: J.R. Horne as Stan of the Swamp, Andie Mechanic as Betty Yeti, Chris Phillips) as Cake Monster, Oliver Wyman) as Baby Dragon, and John O’Hurley
29	3	"The Goblin Cold"	Beth Sleven	Syndi Shumer	Clint Bond, Rossen Varbanov and Steve Wahl	May 20, 2015	1.17
Bobgoblin has come down with a goblin cold. Wally and Betty Yeti need to find the ingredients to cure the Goblin's cold which Bobgoblin is suffering from, although not enough to affect his politeness, still referring to Betty as Miss Elizabeth Yeti.: Letter Concept: B; Opening Sequence: Playing with the Bongos.; "Whoo-ooh-ooh" Gag: Bobgoblin; Characters in Order of Appearance: Bobgoblin, Wally Trollman, Norville Trollman, Betty Yeti, Ogre Doug (cameo); Absent: Taliyah Whitaker as Gina Giant, Jenna Iacono as Libby Light Sprite; Produced B Words: Bongos, Big, Bounce, Bed, Ball, Boomerang, Balloons, Bazoozlehorn, Blast, Burst; Ending Sequence: Ode to a Creature; Guest Stars: Adam Peltzman as Grab Crab, Chris Phillips) as Opera Snail and Rocker Snail, Diana Preisler as Country Snail, Chris Phillips), Diana Priesler, and Dan Bittner as Barbershop Quartet Snails, and Andie Mechanic and Dan Bittner as Snail Chorus
30	4	"Rock and Troll"	Brian Hatfield	Adam Peltzman	Clint Bond, Dan Schier and David Van Tuyle	June 12, 2015	1.02
When Wally's father, Howard's favorite band, The Rockin' Trolls, cancels their concert because of a band member who's sick in bed with the sniffles, Wally and his friends will form a band to cheer him up.: Letter Concept: R; Opening Sequence: Listening to Wally's Father's Favorite Band in the Radio: The Rockin' Trolls; "Whoo-ooh-ooh" Gag: Bobgoblin; Characters in Order of Appearance: Bobgoblin, Wally Trollman, Norville Trollman, Linda Trollman, Howard Trollman (debut), Betty Yeti; Absent: Taliyah Whitaker as Gina Giant, Jorge Vega as Ogre Doug, Jenna Iacono as Libby Light Sprite; Produced R Words: Rock, Roll, Recorder, Rapid, Reverse; Ending Sequence: Wallykazhymes; Guest Star: Jim Gaffigan as Howard Trollman; Return Appearances: Andie Mechanic as Betty Yeti, Alanna Ubach as Linda Trollman, Watt White as The Rockin’ Trolls, Zak Orth as Radio Announcer, and Gregory Abbey as Flipmunk; Notes: This episode features the debut of Wally's Father, Mr. Trollman (Howard Trollman). Instead of the normal credits song, The Rockin' Trolls' song "Hot Chocolate" plays over the credits.
31	5	"Critter Campers"	Eric Fogel	Jim Nolan	Clint Bond, Ron Brewer and Ryan Stapleton	September 15, 2015	0.83
Stan of the Swamp is running a "Critter Campers" scouting group. "Camper Doug" brings Borgelorp, "Camper Light Sprite" brings Chickephant, and "Camper Trollman" brings Norville. "Camper Bobgoblin" shows up with his uncle Robgoblin's purple dragon, Hortis and wants to be Wally's partner. Then Bobgoblin learns that he will have to be great when he is Cooperating with Wally as a partner.: Letter Concept: St---; Opening Sequence: Waving Sticks, Including Norville's (Which is Made by Wally).; "Whoo-ooh-ooh" Gag: Ogre Doug; Characters in Order of Appearance: Bobgoblin, Wally Trollman, Norville Trollman, Hortis (debut), Ogre Doug, Borgelorp, Libby Light Sprite, Chickenphant, Stan of the Swamp; Absent: Taliyah Whitaker as Gina Giant; Produced St--- Words: Stick, Stars, Sticky, Stack, Stilts, Steady, Statue, Stagecoach, Stop; Ending Sequence: A Light Sprite Can Write; Guest Stars: Tyler Bunch as Hortis and Toebugs and Dan Bittner as Pet; Return Appearances: J.R. Horne as Stan of the Swamp, Jason Harris) as Borgelorp, and Vanessa Lemonides as Chickephant; Note: This episode features the debut of Robgoblin's (Bobgoblin's Uncle) Pet Purple Dragon, Hortis.
32	6	"The Big Cake Mistake"	Eric Fogel	Jim Nolan	Clint Bond, Otis Brayboy and Ron Brewer	September 17, 2015	0.91
Wally offers to fulfill his job at the bakery. It turns out the Cake Monster is gainfully employed there. When Cake Monster pours too much Power Flour in, the cakes got too big and caught the bakery on top of the cakes.: Letter Concept: E; Opening Sequence: Exercising at the Playground.; "Whoo-ooh-ooh" Gag: Wally and Norville Trollman; Characters in Order of Appearance: Wally Trollman, Norville Trollman, Bobgoblin, Cake Monster, Barbara Baker, Gina Giant, Stan of the Swamp; Absent: Jorge Vega as Ogre Doug, Jenna Iacono as Libby Light Sprite; Produced E Words: Exercise, Extra, Energy, Eggs, Enlarge, Engine, Exit, Elevator, End; Ending Sequence: Rhyme or Slime; Return Appearances: J.R. Horne as Stan of the Swamp, Stephanie D'Abruzzo as Barbara Baker, Chris Phillips as Cake Monster; Note: This episode features the CGI version of Barbara Baker.
33	7	"Dawn of the Zucchini"	Brian Hatfield	Jim Nolan	Clint Bond, Dan Schier and David Van Tuyle	October 23, 2015	1.02
Wally and Norville meet a gnome in the vegetable garden, who doesn't like his name "Zack" with the letter Z. Then Zack learns how great Z can be when Wally shows him his Magic Stick and can make words that Start with the Letter Z.: Letter Concept: Z; Opening Sequence: Figuring Out What the Magic Letter of the Day Is.; "Whoo-ooh-ooh" Gag: Gina Giant; Characters in Order of Appearance: Wally Trollman, Norville Trollman, Bobgoblin, Gina Giant, Zack the Gnome; Absent: Jorge Vega as Ogre Doug, Jenna Iacono as Libby Light Sprite; Produced Z Words: Zip, Zucchini, Zany, Zombie, Zillion, Zipline, Zero, Zap, Zebra, Zoo, Zilch, Zonk, Zesty, Ziti, Zeppelins, Zigzagging, Zucchinis, Zinger, Zipper, Zig–Zag; Ending Sequence: What a Letter!; Stolen: Vegetables To Make A Salad (TO EAT); Guest Stars: Matt Jones as Zack the Garden Gnome and Jason Harris as Zombie Zucchinis
34	8	"Ricky the Robot" "Ricky Robot"	Ron Brewer and Brian Hatfield	Scott Gray	Clint Bond, Dan Schier and David Van Tuyle	November 3, 2015	1.06
Gina's robot comes to life when Gina switches the power switch on. When Bobgoblin is Impatient and runs away with him, Wally and Gina set out to retrieve him, so Norville can have a turn.: Letter Concept: P; Opening Sequence: Watching a Popsicle Parade.; "Whoo-ooh-ooh" Gag: Gina Giant; Characters in Order of Appearance: Wally Trollman, Norville Trollman, Bobgoblin, Gina Giant, Ricky Robot; Absent: Jorge Vega as Ogre Doug, Jenna Iacono as Libby Light Sprite; Produced P Words: Popsicle, Parade, Popcorn, Power, Pile, Paste, Plane, Pails, Pillows; Ending Sequence: Giant Words with Gina Giant; Stolen: Ricky Robot; Guest Stars: Bradford Scobie as Ricky Robot; Return Appearances: Jason Harris as Monkey
35	9	"A Flouse in the House"	Beth Sleven	Cynthia Riddle	Clint Bond, William Patrick and Rossen Varbanov	November 5, 2015	0.96
Wally, Norville and Gina become detectives to discover who has been taking Gina's possessions from her house.: Letter Concept: D; Opening Sequence: Opening the Doors to See who is Inside.; "Whoo-ooh-ooh" Gag: Gina Giant; Characters in Order of Appearance: Wally Trollman, Norville Trollman, Bobgoblin, Gina Giant, Libby Light Sprite (cameo); Absent: Jorge Vega as Ogre Doug; Produced D Words: Doors, Doorbells, Ding-Dong, Dash, Detectives, Downstairs, Drop, Disappear, Door, Drive, Down; Ending Sequence: Giant Words with Gina Giant; Song: We're the Detectives; Stolen: Slipper, Bike Wheels, and a Horn (To Get A Berry For Breakfast); Guest Stars: Malcolm McDowell as Speaking Flouse and Oliver Wyman) as Squeaking Flouse
36	10	"Young Norville"	Eric Fogel	Scott Gray	Ron Brewer and Ryan Stapleton	November 13, 2015	0.91
When Norville gets hit with the word "Young", he turns into a dragon puppy. Wally and Norville set out to find Ogre Doug, so that he can create a Cure, so Norville can return to adulthood.: Letter Concept: Y; Opening Sequence: Seeing a Yogurt Yodel at their Table.; "Whoo-ooh-ooh" Gag: Wally and Norville Trollman; Characters in Order of Appearance: Wally Trollman, Norville Trollman, Bobgoblin, Hortis, Gina Giant, Ogre Doug, Betty Yeti, Baby Snow Dragon, Libby Light Sprite (cameo); Produced Y Words: Yodeling, Yogurt, Young, Yodel, Yawn, Yo-Yo, Yell, Yummy; Ending Sequence: A Light Sprite Can Write; Return Appearances: Andie Mechanic as Betty Yeti, Tyler Bunch as Hortis, Oliver Wyman) as Baby Dragon, Melissa Van Der Schyff as Yodeling Yogurt, and Dan Bittner as Bat
37	11	"Snowgoblin"	Ron Brewer	Ron Holsey	Dan Schier and David Van Tuyle	January 18, 2016	0.77
Bobgoblin's snow goblin comes to life when Bobgoblin's magic pickle has been placed between the eyes and the mouth. Then Bobgoblin learns that Snowgoblins should live in the Mountains when he discovers that his house is accidentally covered in snow.: Letter Concept: ---ow; Opening Sequence: Having a Glow Bow Show.; "Whoo-ooh-ooh" Gag: Bobgoblin; Characters in Order of Appearance: Bobgoblin, Wally Trollman, Norville Trollman, Snowgoblin, Linda Trollman, Howard Trollman, Betty Yeti, Libby Light Sprite (cameo); Absent: Taliyah Whitaker as Gina Giant, Jorge Vega as Ogre Doug; Produced ---ow Words: Glow, Bow, Show, Snow, Blow, Flow, Row, Grow, Slow; Ending Sequence: A Light Sprite Can Write; Guest Star: Bradford Scobie as Ricky Robot; Return Appearances: Jim Gaffigan as Howard Trollman, Andie Mechanic as Betty Yeti, Adam Peltzman as Snowgoblin, Alanna Ubach as Linda Trollman
38	12	"The Great Missing Potato"	Ron Brewer	Pammy Salmon	Clint Bond, Dan Schier and David Van Tuyle	February 5, 2016	1.08
Not to be confused with the earlier episode "The Great Wishing Potato". Bobgoblin looks after the wishing potato while Goblin Guard is away on his Day Off. When Bobgoblin accidentally loses the Potato, the viewer, Wally, and Norville must help him retrieve the Great Wishing Potato so that Squeaky Cyclops can fixed before the Goblin Guard gets back.: Letter Concept: ---sh; Opening Sequence: Seeing a Fish that can Dash.; "Whoo-ooh-ooh" Gag: Gina Giant; Characters in Order of Appearance: Bobgoblin, Wally Trollman, Norville Trollman, Goblin Guard, Gina Giant; Absent: Jorge Vega as Ogre Doug, Jenna Iacono as Libby Light Sprite; Produced ---sh Words: Dash, Fish, Brush, Rush, Hush, Bush, Wish; Ending Sequence: A Word from Bobgoblin; Guest Stars: Margaret Ying Drake as Gabbin’ Dragon and Chris Phillips) as Pig; Return Appearance: Chris Phillips) as Goblin Guard
39	13	"Going Coconuts"	Beth Sleven	Bradley Zweig	Clint Bond, Rossen Varbanov and Steve Wahl	April 3, 2017	0.65
Wizard Jeff warns Wally and the viewer not to say the word "coconut" when watching his home and Bobgoblin overhears and tries to trick Wally into saying it. He fails but then says it himself, causing a bunch of coconuts to burst out of the closet and bounce around.: Letter Concept: ---at; Opening Sequence: Norville loves Wally's BatMatCat Hat; "Whoo-ooh-ooh" Gag: Gina Giant; Characters in Order of Appearance: Wally Trollman, Norville Trollman, Bobgoblin, Gina Giant, Trash Can, Sheila the Fish; Absent: Jorge Vega as Ogre Doug, Jenna Iacono as Libby Light Sprite; Produced ---at Words: Hat, Cat, Mat, Bat(flying animal), Fat, Vat, Chat, Acrobat, Bat(baseball equipment); Ending Sequence: Giant Word with Gina Giant: Extraordinary; Song: "Get That Flying Fish"; Guest Star: "Weird Al" Yankovic as Wizard Jeff, Adam Peltzman as Trash Can, Stephanie D'Abruzzo as Sheila the Fish and Cat, and Dan Bittner as Bat; Note: The words "Bat" & "Bat" are both seen, but have different meanings.
40	14	"Buddy Pal Friend Day"	Beth Sleven	Syndi Shumer	William Patrick, Simon Thelning and Rossen Varbanov	February 12, 2016	0.98
Everyone picks a pal and gives them a heartfelt gift on Buddy Pal Friend Day, but Bobgoblin receives a gift from Hattie and gives her nothing in return because Bobgoblin does not know how to Think about her, not about himself.: Letter Concept: L; Opening Sequence: Playing with the Large Limbo that is Made out of Licorice; "Whoo-ooh-ooh" Gag: Bobgoblin; Characters in Order of Appearance: Wally Trollman, Norville Trollman, Bobgoblin, Hattie the Witch, Libby Light Sprite, Gina Giant, Ogre Doug (cameo); Produced L Words: Large Licorice Limbo, Low, Large Lollipop, Long Ladder, Lift, Leave, Laughing Leaping Lizard, Lunch; Ending Sequence: Ode to a Creature; Guest Star: Diana Preisler as Lizette the Laughing Leaping Lizard; Return Appearances: Kyla Carter as Hattie the Witch and Jason Harris) as Chad Winklesnad and Dad Winklesnad
41	15	"Keeping Cappie Happy"	Eric Fogel	Scott Gray	Clint Bond, Ron Brewer and Ryan Stapleton	February 16, 2017	0.71
Hattie's younger sister Cappie the Witch (previously shown in a photograph Hattie had in "The Explorer's Club") is introduced in person. Wally needs everyone's help to babysit her when her magical abilities awaken putting her older sister to sleep.: Letter Concept: Short O sounds (O); Opening Sequence: Jumping on Dots they Pop; "Whoo-ooh-ooh" Gag: Bobgoblin; Characters in Order of Appearance: Wally Trollman, Norville Trollman, Bobgoblin, Stan of the Swamp, Hattie the Witch, Cappie the Witch (debut), Ogre Doug; Absent: Taliyah Whitaker as Gina Giant, Jenna Iacono as Libby Light Sprite; Produced short O words: Dots, Pop, Lots, Hop, Gong, Blocks, Top, Spot, Cot, Dot, Pot, Clock, Blob, Lock, Cob, Rock, Mop, Dock, Moth, Sock, Frog, Cod, Top, Knot, Block, Bobgoblin, Jog, Socks; Song: Things I'm Glad I'm Not; Ending Sequence: Spell the Spell; Guest Star: Violet Tinnirello as Cappie; Return Appearance: Kyla Carter as Hattie the Witch; Note: This episode features the debut of Hattie's Little Sister, Cappie, as she previously made a cameo in a picture of her and Hattie in "The Explorer's Club".
42	16	"The Collar Caper"	Ron Brewer	Koyalee Chanda	Dan Schier, Dave Knott and David Van Tuyle	June 19, 2017	N/A
During their game of "Green Sprite, Red Sprite", Norville's collar accidentally comes off and sinks into a lake. Libby Light Sprite comes up with a way to make their own submarine out of a bubble to retrieve it.: Letter Concept: F; Opening Sequence: Wally & Norville made some Funny Faces; "Whoo-ooh-ooh" Gag: Libby Light Sprite; Characters in Order of Appearance: Wally Trollman/Captain Wally, Norville Trollman/First Mate Norville, Bobgoblin, Hortis, Libby Light Sprite/Lookout Libby; Produced F Words: Funny Faces, Fix, Fast, Fan, Fins, Fence, Fun, Fork; Song: "Arrr We Having Fun Yet"; Ending Sequence: A Message for Dragons:How to Bury a Dragon Biscuit; Guest Stars : Chris Phillips) and Jason Harris as Pirate Snails, Adam Peltzman as Grab Crab, Chris Phillips), Jason Harris, and Adam Peltzman as Funny Faces; Return Appearances: Tyler Bunch as Hortis
43	17	"Wally's Great Big Birthday Hunt"	Beth Sleven	Adam Peltzman	William Patrick and Rossen Varbanov	January 26, 2017	N/A
Wally's friends, dressed incognito, send Wally and the viewer on a quest in which Wally must complete challenges and collect letters in order to discover the location of his birthday party.: Letter Concept: H; Opening Sequence: Wally & Norville were Happy, Hopping through Hoops saying "Hip, Hip, Hooray"; "Whoo-ooh-ooh" Gag: Wally and Norville Trollman; Characters in Order of Appearance: Wally Trollman/Birthday Boy, Norville Trollman, Bobgoblin/King Bobgoblin, Linda Trollman (Mrs. Trollman), Howard Trollman (Mr. Trollman), Gina Giant/Mr. Messenger, Betty Yeti/The Singing Snowboarder, Ogre Doug/Ogre of the Forest, Libby Light Sprite/Dr. Light; Produced H Words: Hi, Hello, Happy, Hop, Hoops, Hip, Hip, Hooray, Huge Hops, Halt, Hiccups, Huge Hair, Hug, Hero, Heavy, Home; Ending Sequence: A Message for Dragons; Return Appearances: Andie Mechanic as Betty Yeti, Jim Gaffigan as Howard Trollman, Alanna Ubach as Linda Trollman, Andie Mechanic as Betty Yeti, Jason Harris) as Borgelorp, and Adam Sietz as Howard Trollman’s singing voice
44	18	"Captain Animal"	Eric Fogel	Jim Nolan	Clint Bond, Ron Brewer and Ryan Stapleton	April 15, 2016	N/A
The viewer, Wally, and Norville play superheroes (just like the early episode "Victor The Villain"). Ogre Doug dresses up as a superhero named "Captain Animal" to play with them and finds where Borgelorp and Hattie are but does not know how to be a superhero.: Letter Concept: J; Opening Sequence: Seeing a Joking Jar of Jelly.; "Whoo-ooh-ooh" Gag: Ogre Doug; Characters in Order of Appearance: Wally Trollman/Mighty Troll, Norville Trollman/Wonder Dragon, Bobgoblin, Hattie the Witch, Borgelorp, Ogre Doug/Captain Animal; Absent: Taliyah Whitaker as Gina Giant, Jenna Iacono as Libby Light Sprite; Produced J Words: Joking Jar of Jelly, Juice, Jumpsuit, Jungle, Juggle, Jump, Jack–In–The–Box; Ending Sequence: A Word from Bobgoblin; Guest Star: Ari Rubin as Goorilla; Return Appearances: Kyla Carter as Hattie the Witch, Jason Harris) as Borgelorp and Joking Jar of Jelly, Adam Peltzman as Mumble Monkey, and Vanessa Lemonides as Chickephant
45	19	"The Bathmobile"	Ron Brewer	Adam Peltzman	Dan Schier, Simon Thelning and David Van Tuyle	October 9, 2016	N/A
Wally, with the viewer's help, creates a bathmobile to help clean the town on Clean Up Day; a mud monster (Bobgoblin) roams the forest and gets everyone dirty.: Letter Concept: T; Opening Sequence: Talking through Telephones.; "Whoo-ooh-ooh" Gag: Bobgoblin; Characters in Order of Appearance: Wally Trollman/Bath Troll, Norville Trollman/Scrubbin', Bobgoblin/The Muddler, Gina Giant/Wonder Washer, Libby Light Sprite/Captain Bubble, Borgelorp, Ogre Doug/Spongeboy, Stan of the Swamp; Produced T Words: Telephones, Tub, Towel, Tires, Turn, Top, Turbo, Tools, Team; Ending Sequence: Ode to a Creature; Return Appearance: J.R. Horne (who died in 2016) as Stan of the Swamp; NOTE: This episode was dedicated to J.R. Horne (the voice of Stan of the Swamp) who died on January 14, 2016 following an infection he contracted after his operation.
46	20	"Act Like Your Hat"	Beth Sleven	Adam Peltzman	Clint Bond, William Patrick and Rossen Varbanov	January 12, 2017	N/A
Wally, with help from the viewers, makes his friends hats that makes them act like what their respective hats represent for a hat party. Bobgoblin then stole Wally's hat and now they have to get his hat back.: "Whoo-ooh-ooh" Gag: Gina Giant; Letter Concept: M; Opening Sequence: Seeing a Mop Moo and Meow.; Characters in Order of Appearance: Wally Trollman, Norville Trollman, Bobgoblin, Gina Giant, Ogre Doug; Produced M Words: Mop, Moo, Meow, Music, Magic, Mud, Map, Match; Ending Sequence: Rhyme or Slime; Stolen: Hats; Absent: Jenna Iacono as Libby Light Sprite
47	21	"The Chickephant's Getting Married"	Ron Brewer	Adam Peltzman	William Patrick, Dan Schier, Simon Thelning and David Van Tuyle	February 14, 2017	N/A
Wally plans the Goorilla and Chickephant's wedding with help from the viewers.: "Whoo-ooh-ooh" Gag: Wally and Norville Trollman; Letter Concept: B; Opening Sequence: Bird Band and Birdseed.; Characters in Order of Appearance: Wally Trollman, Norville Trollman, Bobgoblin, Gina Giant, Ogre Doug, ETC; Produced B Words: Bird Band, Birdseed, Balloons, Band, Bike, Backwards, Box, Bow-Ties, Blast, Best Buddy, Big Bone, Bark, Bounce; Guest Stars : Meredith Zeitlin as Lady Bird’s speaking voice, Rachel Bearer as Lady Bird’s singing voice, and Dan Bittner and Chris Phillips) as Musician Birds; Return Appearances: Vanessa Lemonides as Chickephant, Ari Rubin as Goorilla, Bob Ari as the new voice of Stan of the Swamp, Chris Phillips as Cake Monster, Vanessa Bayer as Rockelle, and Adam Peltzman as Mumble Monkey and Bone
48	22	"A Very Villainous Vacation"	Eric Fogel	Scott Gray	Monica Davila, Ryan Stapleton and Simon Thelning	April 5, 2017	N/A
Victor the Villain escapes from Wally's comic again and tries to ruin his family's beach vacation.: Letter Concept: V; Opening Sequence: Wally & Norville love Vegetable Vests; "Whoo-ooh-ooh" Gag: Wally and Norville Trollman; Characters in Order of Appearance: Wally Trollman/Mighty Troll, Norville Trollman/Wonder Dragon, Linda Trollman, Howard Trollman, Victor the Villain; Produced V Words: Vegetable Vest, Vacation, Visors, Villain, Volleyball, Vast, Volleyball Volcano, Vanish.; Ending Sequence: "Rhyme or Slime"; Song: "Vacation Celebration"; Absent: Aria Capria as Bobgoblin, Taliyah Whitaker as Gina Giant, Jorge Vega as Ogre Doug, Jenna Iacono as Libby Light Sprite; Return Appearances: John O'Hurley as Victor the Villian, Jim Gaffigan as Howard Trollman, Alanna Ubach as Linda Trollman, and Adam Sietz as Howard Trollman’s singing voice
49	23	"Ted the Bed"	Beth Sleven	Jim Nolan	William Patrick, Simon Thelning and Rossen Varbanov	May 1, 2017	N/A
Wally and his friends have a sleepover in the clubhouse, but when they forgot their sleeping bags, Wally creates Ted the Bed for them to sleep on.: Letter Concept: Short E sounds; Opening Sequence: Wally & Norville play school; "Whoo-ooh-ooh" Gag: Libby Light Sprite; Characters in Order of Appearance: Wally Trollman, Norville Trollman, Bobgoblin, Ogre Doug, Libby Light Sprite, Night Dragon, Ted the Bed; Absent: Taliyah Whitaker as Gina Giant; Produced short E sound Words: Desk, Pen, Bell, Ted the Bed, Shell, Sled, Left, Net, Jets; Ending Sequence: Dragon Dragon Go To Sleep; Song: "Staying Awake for Some Fun"; Guest Star : Sam Riegel as Ted the Bed; Return Appearance: Emily Bauer as Night Dragon
50	24	"Power Tie"	Eric Fogel	Jim Nolan	Monica Davila, Ryan Stapleton and Simon Thelning	May 3, 2017	N/A
Bobgoblin gets a hold of Mr. Trollman's magic tie (given as a birthday gift from Mrs. Trollman). It's up to the viewers at home to help Wally get it back before it goes out of hand.: Letter Concept: Fl; Opening Sequence: Wally & Norville were trying to catch some Flying Flip-Flops; "Whoo-ooh-ooh" Gag: Bobgoblin; Characters in Order of Appearance: Wally Trollman, Norville Trollman, Bobgoblin, Hattie the Witch, Howard Trollman (Mr. Trollman), Cake Monster, Flipmunk; Produced Fl sound Words: Flying Flip-Flops, Flowers, Flip, Flute, Float, Fly, Fling; Ending Sequence: Spell the Spell; Song: "Up and Away"; Absent: Taliyah Whitaker as Gina Giant, Jorge Vega as Ogre Doug, Jenna Iacono as Libby Light Sprite; Note: Mr. Trollman is voiced by Aaron Phillips instead of Jim Gaffigan in this episode.; Stolen: Power Tie; Return Appearances: Aaron Phillips as Howard Trollman, Chris Phillips) as Cake Monster, Kyla Carter as Hattie the Witch, and Gregory Abbey as Flipmunk
51	25	"Show and Tell and Run"	Eric Fogel	Jim Nolan	Monica Davila and Ryan Stapleton	September 9, 2017	N/A
When Bobgoblin forgets to bring something for school show and tell, he uses the magic word "Wacky" from Wally's stick and accidentally causes wackiness all over town.: Letter Concept: W; Opening Sequence: Wally & Norville were trying to catch a Wiggling Walnut, but they decide to join with the fun; "Whoo-ooh-ooh" Gag: Ogre Doug; Characters in Order of Appearance: Wally Trollman, Norville Trollman, Bobgoblin, Gina Giant, Ogre Doug, Libby Light Sprite, Mrs. Gnomeowitz; Produced W Words: Wiggling Walnut, Wiggle, Wacky, Web, Wash, Whistle, Wall, Weights, Wild, Whirlpool, Whale; Ending Sequence: Chalk Talk!: How To Write The Word "Bobgoblin"; Song: "We're Whistling"; Guest Stars : Amy Sedaris as Mrs. Gnomeowitz, Tyler Bunch as Barking Desks, Michael Barimo as Wally and Mrs. Gnomeowitz’s whistling, and Steve “The Whistler” Herbst as Norville’s whistling
52	26	"Sticky Picnic"	Beth Sleven	Dustin Ferrer	Clint Bond, William Patrick and Rossen Varbanov	September 16, 2017	N/A
When Bobgoblin's drumstick gets broken, he asks Wally and the viewer to repair it. However, when he tossed the word "Sticky" with his broken drumstick, he and Wally got stuck. Now how are Wally and Bobgoblin going to go to Gina's picnic party?: Letter Concept: S; Opening Sequence: Sailing on a Sailing Sofa; "Whoo-ooh-ooh" Gag: Bobgoblin; Characters in Order of Appearance: Wally Trollman, Norville Trollman, Bobgoblin, Gina Giant, Ogre Doug, Libby Light Sprite; Produced S Words: Sailing Sofa, Sneeze, Sticky, Soapy Suds, Sandwiches, Seesaw, Sack of Sand, Skates, Soup, Soar, Split; Ending Sequence: Giant Words with Gina Giant: "Peculiar"; Song: "Stick with Each Other"
