= Wallykazam! =

American animated TV series

- Genre: Fantasy musical Educational; Comedy
- Created by: Adam Peltzman
- Voices of: Thomas Langston; Dan Bittner; Aria Capria; Taliyah Whitaker; Jorge Vega; Jenna Iacono; J.R. Horne; Kyla Carter
- Theme music composer: Paul Buckley
- Opening theme: "Say the Word" by Paul Buckley, lyrics by Paul Buckley and Adam Peltzman
- Ending theme: "Wally, Wally, Wally" by Andrew Barkan and Polly Hall, lyrics by Andrew Barkan, Polly Hall, Dave Palmer, and Adam Peltzman
- Composer: Paul Buckley
- Country of origin: United States
- Original language: English
- No. of seasons: 2
- No. of episodes: 52 (list of episodes)

Production
- Executive producers: Adam Peltzman; Dave Palmer; Koyalee Chanda
- Running time: 24 minutes
- Production company: Nickelodeon Animation Studio

Original release
- Network: Nickelodeon (2014–16); Nick Jr. Channel (2016–17); Treehouse TV (Canada)
- Release: February 3, 2014 – September 16, 2017

Wallykazam! is an American CGI interactive children's animated television series created by Adam Peltzman. The series was first broadcast on February 3, 2014 on Nickelodeon's Nick Jr. block and ended on September 16, 2017. In Canada, it was broadcast on Treehouse TV. In December 2020, the entire series was added to Paramount+ (at the time CBS All Access).

== Premise ==
The series takes place in a colorful fairytale world and follows a young troll named Wally Trollman, who, with "assistance" from the audience, uses his magic stick to turn words into physical objects or occurrences, along with his pet dragon Norville and other friends. The duo occasionally runs into trouble, mostly caused by Bobgoblin.

== Characters ==
=== Main ===
- Wally Trollman (voiced by Thomas Langston) is an adventurous 6-year-old blue troll and the host of the show. He uses his magic stick to allow words to come to life. His mother, Linda Trollman, debuted in the season one finale "Mission for Mom".
- Norville Trollman (voiced by Dan Bittner) is a red dragon and Wally's pet. He cannot speak clearly, his barks and yips form words but are sometimes hard to understand. In some cases Wally repeats the words Norville says, allowing the audience to hear it pronounced more clearly.
- Bobgoblin (voiced by Aria Capria and Tony Bennett (singing voice in Wally Saves the Trollidays)) is a troublesome green goblin who talks in the third person and habitually addresses people by their full names. He has an uncle named Robgoblin who lets him take care of his pet dragon Hortis sometimes. His buddy-pal-friend is Hattie. He is also among Wally's friends and his strength was enhanced by Wally enchanting him with the magic word "Lift." Bobgoblin enjoys music, and in several episodes is shown to play the drums very proficiently.
- Gina Giant (voiced by Taliyah Whitaker) is Wally's neighbor and one of his best friends. She is a 6-year-old purple giant with blonde hair and turquoise eyes who has a collection of dolls. Wally magically enhanced her agility by transforming her into an acrobat, and she is able to do cartwheels, front flips, and a double backflip while capturing Wizard Jeff's flying fish Sheila.
- Ogre Doug (voiced by Jorge Vega) is one of Wally's good friends. He is a gentle 7-year-old yellow ogre who has red hair and wears suspenders. He is a creature expert who likes studying creatures, playing with creatures, and writing songs about creatures; he plays the guitar (as seen in “Wally Saves the Trollidays”, the “Alphabet Song”, and the “Ode to a Creature” songs). Also, he likes to hug, saying "Doug Hug!" as he does so.
- Libby Light Sprite (voiced by Jenna Iacono) is a 4-year old energetic pink sprite with purple hair and the ability to trace words from light. Like Ogre Doug, she is also good friends with Wally. She is later revealed to be the Buddy Pal Friend of Gina. She enjoys singing, dancing, and putting on light shows with her powers.

=== Recurring ===
==== Other characters ====
- Stan of the Swamp (voiced by J.R. Horne (2014–2016, his death) and Bob Ari (2016–2017)) is a swamp monster who would rather spend his day sitting in his muddy home than going on an adventure. However, his swamp home and succotash pies bring him happiness that the others do not expect from a grump like him.
- Mrs. Trollman (later revealed to be named Linda, voiced by Alanna Ubach) is Wally's mom. She is pictured at the end of "Wally Saves the Trollidays", mentioned in "Young Norville", "The Great Wishing Potato", "Buddy Pal Friend Day", and "Power Tie", debuts in person in "Mission for Mom" and returns in "Rock and Troll", "Snowgoblin", "Wally's Great Big Birthday Hunt", "The Chickephant is Getting Married", and "A Very Villainous Vacation".
- Mr. Trollman (later revealed to be named Howard voiced by Jim Gaffigan and Aaron Phillips (Power Tie only), singing voice by Antonio Marin (in Wally's Great Big Birthday Hunt) and Adam Sietz (in A Very Villainous Vacation)) is Wally's dad. He is mentioned in "Totally Swamped", "Day in the Dark", and "Buddy Pal Friend Day", pictured in "Wally Saves the Trollidays", debuts in person in "Rock and Troll" and returns in "Snowgoblin", "Wally's Great Big Birthday Hunt", "The Chickephant is Getting Married", "A Very Villainous Vacation", and "Power Tie".
- Skydasher Steve (aka Steve the Skydasher, voiced by Ben Schwartz) is Wally's uncle. He debuts in "The Big Goblin Problem". He returns in "The Chickephant is Getting Married", but no episode has specified if he is whether the brother of Linda or Howard.
- Betty Yeti (voiced by Andie Mechanic) is a snowboarding yeti. She debuts in "Snow Place Like Home" and returns in many episodes, including the Alphabet Song. She is also called Elizabeth Yeti, and hides one of Wally's birthday clues in his hunt.
- Hattie (Voiced by Kyla Carter) is a witch. She has a younger sister named Cappie.
- Cappie (voiced by Violet Tinnirello) is the younger sister of Hattie. She is in a photograph in "The Explorers Club", debuts in person in "Keeping Cappie Happy" and returns in "The Chickephant is Getting Married".
- Cake Monster (voiced by Chris Phillips) is a yeti-like monster with a huge appetite for birthday cakes. He debuts in "The Cake Monster" and returns in "The Big Cake Mistake", the Alphabet Song during the letter C, "The Chickephant is Getting Married!", and "Power Tie".
- Victor the Villain (voiced by John O'Hurley) is a villain from a comic book who is brought to life from Wally's magic. He debuts in his titular episode and returns in the Alphabet Song during the letter V, "The Chickephant is Getting Married" and "A Very Villainous Vacation".
- Marsha of the Marsh, the niece of Stan, appears in "Play It Again, Stan!" and returns in "The Chickephant is getting Married". Ripley Sobo provides her voice.
- Barbara Baker (voiced by Stephanie D'Abruzzo) is a green, furry monster who runs a bakery in the town square. She debuts in "The Cake Monster" and returns in many episodes just like Betty.
- Wizard Jeff (voiced by "Weird Al" Yankovic) is a green-skinned wizard. He debuts in "Mustache Day" and returns in "Going Coconuts" and "The Chickephant is Getting Married".
- Rockelle is a female rock who came to life from Wally's magic in "The Rock Can Talk". She reappeared in "The Chickephant is Getting Married!" She is voiced by Vanessa Bayer.
- Zack the Garden Gnome (voiced by Matt Jones) is Gina's garden gnome who appears in "Dawn of the Zucchini" and returns in "The Chickephant is Getting Married!".

==== Goblins ====
- Robgoblin is Bobgoblin's uncle and Hortis's owner. He is mentioned in "Critter Campers" and possibly mentioned as one of Bob's uncles coming to his family dance party in "The Big Cake Mistake".
- Goblin Guard (voiced by Chris Phillips) is a goblin who guards the wishing potato. He debuts in "The Great Wishing Potato" and returns in "The Great Missing Potato" and "The Chickephant is Getting Married". In Missing Potato, Bobgoblin takes over his duties. Bobgoblin's mother is said to know Goblin Guard's mother. He has a jetpack which he uses to ascend a hill.
- Momgoblin is Bobgoblin's mother. She is by Bob mentioned in "The Great Missing Potato" and also on his (Bob's) Twitter page

==== Dragons ====
- Baby Snow Dragon (voiced by Oliver Wyman) is a purple baby dragon who lives on top of Mount Chillimonjaro. He debuts in "Snow Place Like Home" and returns in "The Dragon Games", "Young Norville" and the Alphabet Song during the letter F.
- Night Dragon (voiced by Emily Bauer) is a pink dragon who glows in the dark. She debuts in "Day in the Dark" and returns in "The Dragon Games" and "Ted the Bed". Norville seems to have a little bit of a crush on her.
- Victoria (voiced by Vanessa Lemonides) is Skydasher Steve's blue-purple dragon who Norville likes. She debuts in the same episodes as Steve.
- Hortis (voiced by Tyler Bunch) is a purple dragon who is owned by Bobgoblin's uncle Robgoblin. He debuts in "Critter Campers" and returns in "Young Norville", "The Collar Caper" and "The Chickephant is Getting Married".

==== Pets and other creatures ====
- Borgelorp (voiced by Jason Harris) is one of Ogre Doug's pets who Wally and Norville once babysat. He debuts in "Naptime for Borgelorp" and returns in "The Cake Monster", "Castle Cafe", "Critter Campers", "Captain Animal", and "The Bathmobile".
- Blathertash (voiced by Adam Peltzman) is another one of Ogre Doug's pets who appears in "Dragon Hiccups" and "The Cake Monster".
- Chad (aka Chad the Winklesnad, voiced by Jason Harris) is Ogre Doug's green pet Winklesnad. He turns red when angered and blue when saddened. He also has a dad (also voiced by Harris). He debuts at the end of "Hopgoblin" and returns at the end of "Buddy Pal Friend Day".
- Flibberflug is another of the pets that looks like a bug. He is mentioned in "Great Galloping Goblins", debuts at the end of "Play It Again, Stan" and returns in "The Big Goblin Problem".
- Chickephant (frequently misspelled as Chickenphant in TV guide titles and summaries, voiced by Vanessa Lemonides) is a creature who is a hybrid of a chicken and an elephant. Wally, Norville, Ogre Doug, Bobgoblin, and Hattie discover her. Libby also brings her to Critter Campers Scouting Group. She debuts in "The Explorers Club" and returns in "Critter Campers" and "Captain Animal". Doug marries her the Goorilla in the village of Mossy Hollow during "The Chickephant is Getting Married!".
- Lightning Snail is a fast snail who delivers the mail. She debuts in "Dragon Hiccups" and returns in "Play It Again, Stan" and "The Big Goblin Problem". Her catchphrase is "I bring the mail on time with a lot of slime" while singing it. Her actor is Fran Brill.
- Flipmunk is a chipmunk that flips in "A Tiny Problem" and "Wally Saves the Trollidays."
- Grab Crab (voiced by Adam Peltzman) is a crab who grabs things with his pincers and like Bobgoblin, says his own name a lot. He debuted in "The Goblin Cold" and returns in "The Chickephant is Getting Married!". He creates conflict by grabbing items of importance. However, in order to grab something else, he must let whatever he has already grabbed go, thus he can be distracted by providing him another item to grab.
- Goorilla (voiced by Ari Rubin) is a gorilla that's covered in goo in "Captain Animal". He reappears again in "The Chickephant is Getting Married!" where Doug marries Goorilla to the Chickephant in the village of Mossy Hollow.
- Flouse (voiced by Oliver Wyman (noise) and Malcolm McDowell (speaking)) is a mouse that took Gina's stuff in "Flouse in the House". He watches the Chickephant and the Goorilla getting married in "The Chickephant is Getting Married!".
- Mumble Monkey (voiced by Adam Peltzman) is a blue monkey-like creature that attends the Chickephant's wedding. He was introduced in "Totally Swamped" to try get Stan laugh to get Wally's glider back. Doug introduces him to read poetry. He later dances with Betty.

== Episode structure ==
Each episode ends with one of 11 sketches which rotates each episode.

- Alphabet Song – Wally and his friends sing the alphabet.
- And Now a Word From Bobgoblin – Bobgoblin tries to demonstrate words from a certain word family "example: -ey family" but his efforts end in failure or backfire.
- Giant Words with Gina Giant – Gina demonstrates particularly long words she likes in a comical way.
- Howl Like the Vowel – Wally and Norville demonstrate one of the five vowels through sentences.
- A Light Sprite Can Write – Libby Light Sprite demonstrates the viewer how to trace simple letters or words.
- Message for Dragons – Wally shows the viewers how friendly dragons should behave.
- Ode to a Creature – Ogre Doug makes up a song about his appreciation to a certain animal.
- Rhyme or Slime – Wally does a rhyming game with one of his friends, along with Bobgoblin. When Bobgoblin says a word that doesn't rhyme, he gets slimed in the way that Nickelodeon has always done it.
- Wallykazhymes – Wally and one of his friends demonstrate a group of words that rhyme.
- Wally, Wally, Wally, Wallykazam – Wally spells his name and after he does he and the other characters sing the signature closing song.
- What a Letter – Wally tells the viewer about a certain letter featured in the episode.

== Episodic anthologies ==
Unique titles have been created to refer to certain episodes grouped together:

- Volume 1 released 3 February 2014 collects 13 episodes:

1. Naptime for Borgelorp

2. Castle Caper

3. The Rock Can Talk

4. How to Bathe Your Dragon

5. Dragon Hiccups

6. Picnic: Impossible

7. Totally Swamped

8. Day In the Dark

9. The Great Wishing Potato

10. Running Rita

11. The Cake Monster

12. Great Galloping Goblins

13. Victor the Villain

- Volume 2 released 10 June 2014 collects 12 episodes:

14. Snow Place Like Home

15. The Switching Stone

16. Play It Again, Stan

17. A Tiny Problem

18. Castle Cafe

19. The Dragon Games

20. Mustache Day

21. Wally Saves the Trollidays

22. The Big Goblin Problem

23. Hopgoblin

24. The Explorers Club

25. The Nice Ninjas

Play Pack released 25 August 2014 collects 4 episodes from Volume 1: "The Cake Monster", "Running Rita", "Picnic: Impossible" and "Castle Caper". Bobgoblin Problems released 6 April 2015 collects 4 episodes from Volume 2: "The Big Goblin Problem", "Hopgoblin", "The Switching Stone" and "The Dragon Games".

- Volume 3 released 8 May 2015 collects 13 episodes:

26. Mission for Mom

27. Home Swamp Home

28. The Goblin Cold

29. Rock and Troll

30. Going Coconuts

31. Critter Campers

32. The Big Cake Mistake

33. Dawn of the Zucchini

34. Ricky Robot

35. A Flouse in the House

36. Young Norville

37. Snowgoblin

38. The Great Missing Potato

- Volume 4 released 11 February 2016 collects 14 episodes

39. Buddy Pal Friend Day

40. The Great Missing Potato

41. Captain Animal

42. The Bathmobile

43. Wally's Great Big Birthday Hunt

44. Act Like Your Hat

45. The Chickphant's Getting Married!

46. Keeping Cappie Happy

47. A Very Villainous Vacation

48. Ted the Bed

49. Power Tie

50. Show and Tell and Run

51. Sticky Picnic

52. The Collar Caper

== In other media ==
=== Books ===
Some books have been made based on the TV series:

Big Golden Books:

- Dragon Hiccups
- Wally's Magical Adventures
- Mighty Troll and Wonder Dragon

Board books:

- Wally's Best Friends
- Welcome to the Forest
- Forest Friends!

Coloring and Activity books:

- Giant Adventures
- Words with Wally!
- Helping Friends!

Paint box books:

- P is for Paint

Stories with stickers:

- Bath Party!
- Castle Caper
- S is for Stickers
- T Is for Troll
- The Cake Monster
- Troll Time!
- Welcome to Wally's World!
- A Tiny Problem
- Picnic Party!
- Tricks, Treats, and Trolls!
- The Dragon Games

=== Games ===
Nick Jr. has a games section including crossovers with other Nick Jr. series and two exclusively based on the show:

1. Fruit Frenzy!
2. Magic Word Hunt involves looking for 40 biscuits and 5 words that begin with G: gallop (producing a galloping table), giggle (causing Norville to giggle), goblin (causing Bobgoblin to appear), ghost (producing a ghost) and gargantuan (a giant word, causing Norville and Wally to grow in the presence of Gina)

=== Soundtrack ===
Rock N' Troll is the first Wallykazam soundtrack, containing all 26 songs from the 1st season, being released on December 17, 2021.
