= Lisa Guernsey =

American journalist (born 1971)

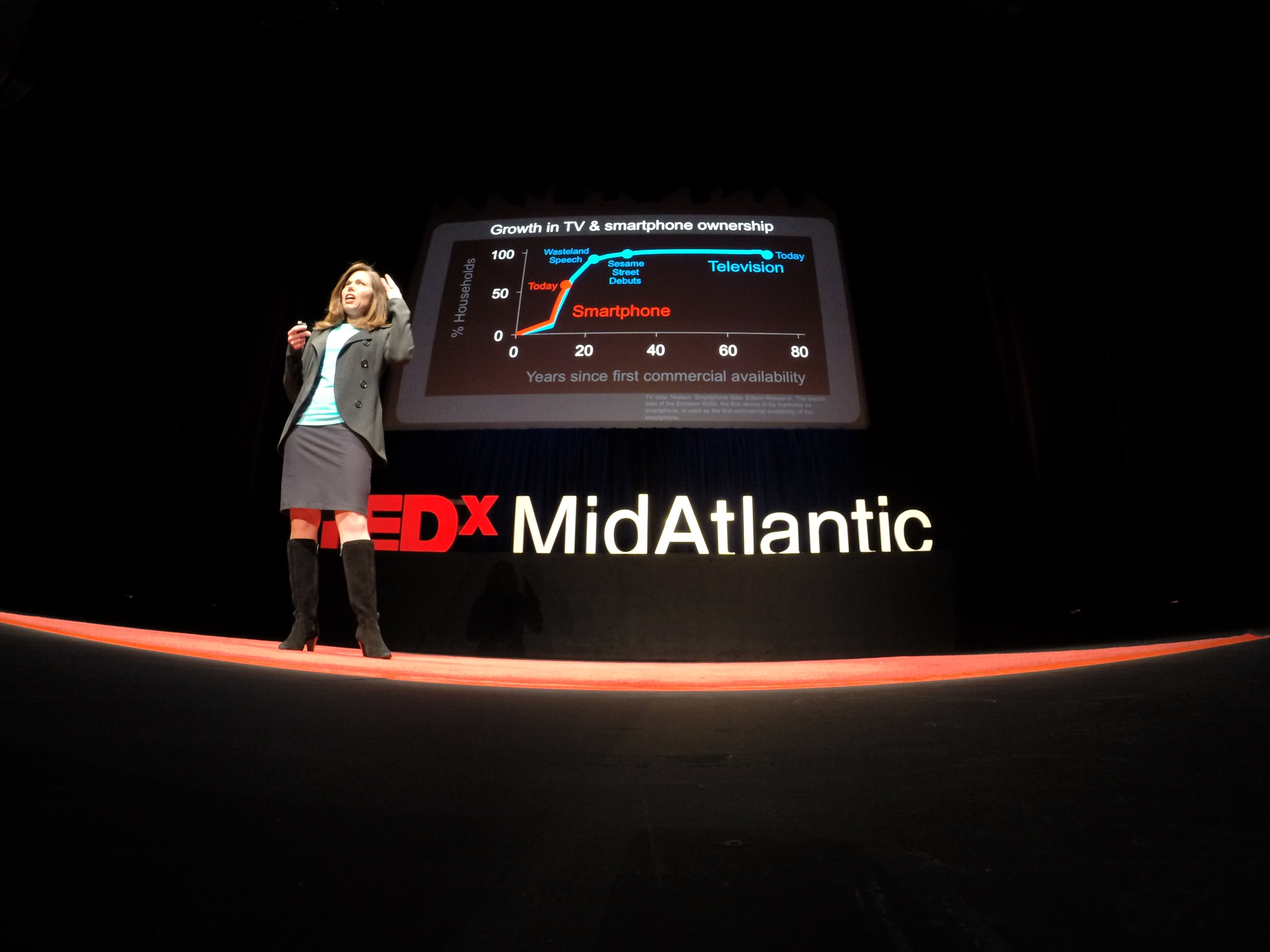
- Guernsey at TEDxMidAtlantic 2013.
- Born: April 6, 1971 (age 55); Lebanon, New Hampshire, U.S.
- Education: University of Virginia
- Occupations: Director of New America's Early Education Initiative, Early Education writer, technology writer, policy analyst, journalist, author
- Known for: Analysis of Early Education and Technology

Lisa Guernsey (born April 6, 1971, in Lebanon, New Hampshire) is an American early education researcher, author, and former journalist. She is currently director of the Learning Technologies Project at New America, a non-profit, non-partisan research organization based in Washington, D.C. She is also deputy director of the organization's Education Policy Program.

Guernsey is a former technology and education writer at The New York Times.

She has written for numerous other major publications including The Chronicle of Higher Education, The Washington Post, the Los Angeles Times, Time.com, Newsweek and others. She is the author of Screen Time: How Electronic Media – From Baby Videos to Educational Software – Affects Your Young Child, and co-author, with Michael H. Levine, of the forthcoming Tap, Click, Read: Growing Readers in a World of Screens.

In 2012, Guernsey won a gold Eddie magazine award for her article on e-books for the School Library Journal. She was also a 2005 journalism fellow at the University of Maryland in their child and family policy program. Guernsey has also served on various committees during her career, including the Education & Youth Development subcommittee of the Advisory Committee on Public Issues for the Ad Council.

== Education and personal life ==
Guernsey was born in Lebanon, New Hampshire, but has lived in Virginia for most of her life. She obtained a bachelor's degree in English and a master's degree in English/American Studies from the University of Virginia in 1994. Guernsey has two daughters, Janelle and Gillian, and they live in Alexandria's Del Ray neighborhood.

== Career ==
Once Guernsey completed her Bachelors and masters degrees in 1994 from the University of Virginia through their joint BA/MA program, she moved to Alexandria, Virginia, and began working as the Associate Editor of The Chronicle of Higher Education. Then, in 1999, she became a reporter for The New York Times where she wrote articles about new technology, science and education.

After she left The New York Times in 2002, she began freelancing for a number of major publications and was a contributor to the book Mobile Technology for Children: Designing for Interaction and Learning. This book focused on the impact of mobile technology on children.

Guernsey started at New America in 2009 as a senior policy analyst and became the Director of the Early Education Initiative that same year. She became head of the organization's new Learning and Technologies Project in 2013. Her recent research and writing is focused on progress in early education and digital learning technologies.

During her time at New America, Guernsey has written four more books. Her 2012 book, Screen Time: How Electronic Media – From Baby Videos to Educational Software – Affects Your Young Child, focuses on issues related to the influence of television of young children. Through the authorship of this book, Guernsey conducted extensive research, concluding that exposure to television need not be negative for young children when new parents focus on "the three C's" involved: content, context and the individual child.

In 2013, she presented a TEDx talk in Washington, D.C., on the influence of new technologies, like iPads, on early learning.

Her latest book, Tap, Click, Read: Growing Readers in a World of Screens, was published in September 2015 and is co-written with Michael H. Levine of the Cooney Center at Sesame Workshop.

== Books ==
- Guernsey, L. College.Edu: Online Resources for the Cyber-Savvy Student. Octameron Associates, 2010.
- Guernsey, L. Into the Minds of Babes: How Screen Time Affects Children from Birth to Age Five. Basic Books, 2007
- Guernsey, L. Screen Time: How Electronic Media – From Baby Videos to Educational Software – Affects Your Young Child. Basic Books, 2012
- Guernsey, L. and Levine, M. H. Tap, Click, Read: Growing Readers in a World of Screens. Wiley/Jossey-Bass, 2015.
