= Yoga Friends =

2020 American children's TV series

- Genre: Educational
- Developed by: Shane Spiegel; Chelsea Butler
- Directed by: Mary Risk; Shane Spiegel; Dave Cain
- Presented by: Stephanie Wong; Trinidad Ramkissoon
- Voices of: Phoenix Averiyire
- Composers: Andrew Barkan; Polly Hall
- Country of origin: United States
- Original language: English
- No. of seasons: 1
- No. of episodes: 27

Production
- Producer: Michael H. Levine
- Running time: 11 minutes
- Production companies: Noggin Originals; Breathe for Change

Original release
- Network: Noggin
- Release: February 18, 2020 – February 4, 2024

Yoga Friends is an American children's television series that premiered on the Noggin streaming service. It ran from February 18, 2020, until February 4, 2024. The series features a live-action host, Stephanie, who journeys into an animated world where she uses her knowledge of exercise and yoga poses to solve problems. Music for the series was composed by the duo Andrew & Polly.

The series ran for 27 episodes in total. In addition to the regular episodes, 28 shorts were made for a miniseries called Yoga Friends: Challenge Weeks in January 2024. The show was also released on Amazon Video and Apple TV+. The first six episodes were released to Paramount+ in 2020, but the remaining 21 episodes were not added.

In 2023, Yoga Friends won a Webby Award in the Video Animation category.

== Premise ==
In each episode, Stephanie goes on an adventure in an animated world (like visiting the moon, traveling back in time to meet dinosaurs, or joining an animated rock band) and teaches yoga poses related to the theme of the episode. The poses usually help her solve a problem or reach a goal in the animated world.

A recurring animated character is Billie the Yoga Goat, who is learning yoga from Stephanie and often asks for the viewers' help to master certain moves. Stephanie is sometimes joined by a second human host, Trinidad.

For example, one episode follows Stephanie (dressed as a knight) as she uses dragon-inspired yoga moves to rescue Billie from a tower. Another episode features Stephanie and Billie (dressed as builders with hard hats) on an animated construction site, learning construction-inspired yoga poses as they build a house.

== Characters ==
- Stephanie (played by Stephanie Wong) - A yoga teacher who hosts the show. She starts and ends each episode in a live-action room called the Cozy Corner. She spends the middle of each episode in an animated world.
- Billie the Yoga Goat (voiced by Phoenix Averiyire) - An animated goat who joins Stephanie on her adventures. At the end of most episodes, Billie also recaps the poses that were learned.
- Trinidad (played by Trinidad Ramkissoon) - Stephanie's friend and the only other live-action human in the series. He wears glasses and is a yoga expert like Stephanie.

== History ==
The series was part of Noggin Originals, a set of original series made specifically for Noggin. The first season was released in early 2020 and introduced one simple yoga pose in each episode. The second season, released in 2022, had longer episodes with more involved stories, animated worlds and characters, and multiple yoga poses in each story.

Michael H. Levine, the president of Noggin, said that the show was meant to inspire mindfulness. He said, "Learning mindfulness and new exercise skills are an important part of wellbeing for every young child ... [the show teaches skills] that they can demonstrate in the real world."

In an interview with Noggin, Dr. Ilana Nankin (the show's educational consultant) described how the show teaches social-emotional skills just as much as physical exercise. She said, "Yoga is not just the physical practice. I think, especially in Western society, we think about Downward Dog or the Warrior II poses. But [Yoga Friends] is about embodying the ethical principles of yoga, like non-violence or being kind to ourselves."

To promote the show, Noggin released a set of printable Yoga Friends cards, which could be downloaded through the Noggin.com website.

== Episodes ==
=== Shorts (2020) ===
No. overall	No. in season	Title	Original release date	Prod. code
1	1	"Robot Chair Pose"	February 18, 2020	101
2	2	"Guppy Pose"	February 18, 2020	102
3	3	"Cobra Pose"	March 17, 2020	103
4	4	"Genie Warrior Pose"	March 17, 2020	104
5	5	"Tree Pose"	April 5, 2020	105
6	6	"Triangle Pose"	April 5, 2020	106

=== Long-form episodes (2021–24) ===
No. overall	No. in season	Title	Original release date	Prod. code
1	7	"Farm Friends Yoga"	July 17, 2022	201
2	8	"Rock 'n Roll Yoga"	July 24, 2022	202
3	9	"Eagle Pose & More!"	July 31, 2022	203
4	10	"5 Senses Countdown"	July 31, 2022	204
5	11	"Happy Hands Yoga"	August 14, 2022	205
6	12	"DIY Peace Potion"	August 28, 2022	206
7	13	"Paw Patrol Yoga"	November 20, 2022	207
8	14	"Space Yoga"	November 27, 2022	208
9	15	"Ocean Yoga"	December 4, 2022	209
10	16	"Best Friends Yoga"	December 11, 2022	210
11	17	"Nighttime Yoga"	December 18, 2022	211
12	18	"Butterfly Yoga"	December 25, 2022	212
13	19	"Jungle Yoga"	January 1, 2023	213
14	20	"Dragon Yoga"	December 31, 2023	214
15	21	"Construction Yoga"	January 7, 2024	215
16	22	"Zoo Yoga"	January 7, 2024	216
17	23	"Dinosaur Yoga"	January 21, 2024	217
18	24	"Red Light, Green Light"	February 4, 2024	218
19	25	"Yoga Spinner"	February 4, 2024	219
20	26	"Pose Knows!"	February 4, 2024	220
21	27	"Yoga Balloons"	February 4, 2024	221

== Awards ==
Year	Presenter	Award/Category	Nominee	Status	Ref.
2023	Webby Awards	Video Animation (Series & Channels)	Yoga Friends	Honoree	
