= The New Childhood =

Book by Jordan Shapiro

First edition

The New Childhood: Raising Kids to Thrive in a Connected World by Jordan Shapiro is a book published by Little, Brown and Company in December 2018.

== Synopsis ==
Shapiro, who teaches at Temple University in the College of Liberal Arts, became interested in childhood development and digital play following his divorce, after playing video games with his two sons. He argues against strict screen time limits for kids, suggesting instead that parents should teach their kids how to use digital devices with integrity. He advises parents not to panic about new technologies. He advocates for joint media engagement.

His view that kids can only learn proper ethics for a connected world by spending more time with digital technology has been controversial, causing writer Naomi Schaefer Riley to complain, "the idea that parents might forbid or severely limit their children's devices—or take the devices away altogether—is anathema to him."
