= Gas Huffin' Bad Gals! =

2000 short film

Gas Huffin' Bad Gals! is a 2000 film written by and starring Bradford Scobie. It was accepted into the Cannes Film Festival, the New York Underground Film Festival, the Outfest festival in Los Angeles, and was broadcast in England by BBC television. It was not shown in the rest of the United Kingdom.
