= Amanda Steinberg =

American computer programmer

- Born: 1977 or 1978 (age 48–49)
- Education: B.A. Columbia College
- Occupations: Investor, financial adviser
- Known for: Founder of DailyWorth
- Spouse: Jordan Shapiro

Amanda Steinberg (born 1977/1978) is the founder of DailyWorth, a financial media platform for professional women focusing on money and business, in 2009. She is also the author of the book Worth It: Your Life, Your Money, Your Terms (2017, Simon and Schuster)

== Early life and education ==
Steinberg graduated from The Baldwin School in Bryn Mawr, Pennsylvania in 1995 and from Columbia College, where she was an urban studies major, in 1999. Subsequently, she became a computer programmer earning six figures. She is of Jewish descent.

== Career ==
Steinberg was first a computer programmer, and had founded a million-dollar software company by age 29. A year later, she was $100,000 in debt. Disappointed by her inability to save money and to build net worth, she launched DailyWorth from Philadelphia the same week her daughter was born in 2009. DailyWorth is mainly a website and newsletter where Amanda Steinberg publishes financial advice for women. Today, her newsletter reach over one million subscribers. Steinberg has since raised over $2 Million in venture capital for DailyWorth. In 2018, the company was purchased by NBC journalist Jean Chatzky, a move Chatzky made after investing in the company for 4 years.

In 2016, she also launched a robo-adviser tailored for females with Source Financial called Worth Financial Management. She is a member of Oprah Winfrey's SuperSoul 100 and named one of the 21 "New American Money Masters" by Forbes.
