= Jason L. Riley =

American journalist (born 1971)

- Born: July 8, 1971 (age 55); Buffalo, New York, U.S.
- Education: University at Buffalo (BA)
- Occupation: Commentator
- Spouse: Naomi Schaefer (m. 2004)
- Children: 3
- Website: Official website

Jason L. Riley (born July 8, 1971) is an American conservative commentator and author. He is a member of The Wall Street Journal's editorial board. Riley is a senior fellow at the Manhattan Institute and has appeared on the Journal Editorial Report, other Fox News programs and C-SPAN. He is Black and has written about his Black experience in America as a conservative. He is the author of several books including Let Them In: The Case for Open Borders (2008), Please Stop Helping Us: How Liberals Make It Harder for Blacks to Succeed (2014), False Black Power? (2017), Maverick: A Biography of Thomas Sowell (2021) and The Affirmative Action Myth: Why Blacks Don't Need Racial Preferences to Succeed (2025).

== Early life and education ==
Riley was born in Buffalo, New York to Lee Riley of Buffalo and Ola Riley. His father retired as a social worker at the Buffalo Psychiatric Center, a residential psychiatric treatment hospital.

Jason Riley grew up in a religious household. His mother was Baptist and later converted to become a Jehovah's Witness. He was also baptized as a Jehovah's Witness when he was approximately fifteen years old and left the religion some years later.

He earned a bachelor's of arts degree in English from the State University of New York at Buffalo. He began his career in journalism working for the Buffalo News and USA Today.

== Career ==
Riley joined The Wall Street Journal in 1994 as a copyreader on the national news desk in New York City. In April 1996, he was named to the newly created position of editorial interactive editor, and joined the editorial board in 2005.

Riley is the author of five books. In 2008, he published Let Them In: The Case for Open Borders, which argues for a more free market-oriented U.S. immigration system.

In 2014, Riley published Please Stop Helping Us: How Liberals Make It Harder for Blacks to Succeed. In National Review Thomas Sowell praised the book, writing: "Pick up a copy and open pages at random to see how the author annihilates nonsense." According to Salon, "[t]he American left should start paying attention to The Wall Street Journal's Jason Riley. His name is on the rise."

In his 2017 book False Black Power?, Riley argues economic success is a more important strategy for the empowerment of black people than dependence on political leadership. In 2021, Riley published Maverick: A Biography of Thomas Sowell.

In 2024, Riley was subject to ridicule online after arguing in a July 9th opinion piece for the Wall Street Journal that Kamala Harris would be the best Democratic candidate to run for President, only to reverse the position two weeks later and hours after Harris became the presumptive Democratic nominee arguing in another opinion piece for the Journal that Kamala Harris is not the change Democrats need.

== Personal life ==
Riley married fellow journalist Naomi Schaefer Riley in 2004. They reside in suburban New York City with their three children.

== Bibliography ==
- Let Them In: The Case for Open Borders (2008)
- Please Stop Helping Us: How Liberals Make It Harder for Blacks to Succeed (2014)
- False Black Power? (2017)
- Maverick: A Biography of Thomas Sowell (2021)
- The Black Boom (2022)
- The Affirmative Action Myth: Why Blacks Don't Need Racial Preferences to Succeed (2025)

== See also ==
- Black conservatism in the United States
