= False Black Power? =

2017 book by Jason L. Riley

- First edition
- Author: Jason L. Riley
- Genre: Non-fiction
- Publisher: Templeton Press
- Publication date: 2017
- Publication place: United States
- Pages: 128
- ISBN: 1599475189

False Black Power ? is a 2017 book by conservative journalist Jason L. Riley. In the book, Riley asserts that despite African American gains in political power over time, culminating in the first black president, Barack Obama did not produce tangible socioeconomic improvement for African Americans. Moreover, Riley argues that the opposite happened and as a group, African Americans progressed at a slower rate than whites.
