= Bradford Scobie =

Performance artist in New York City

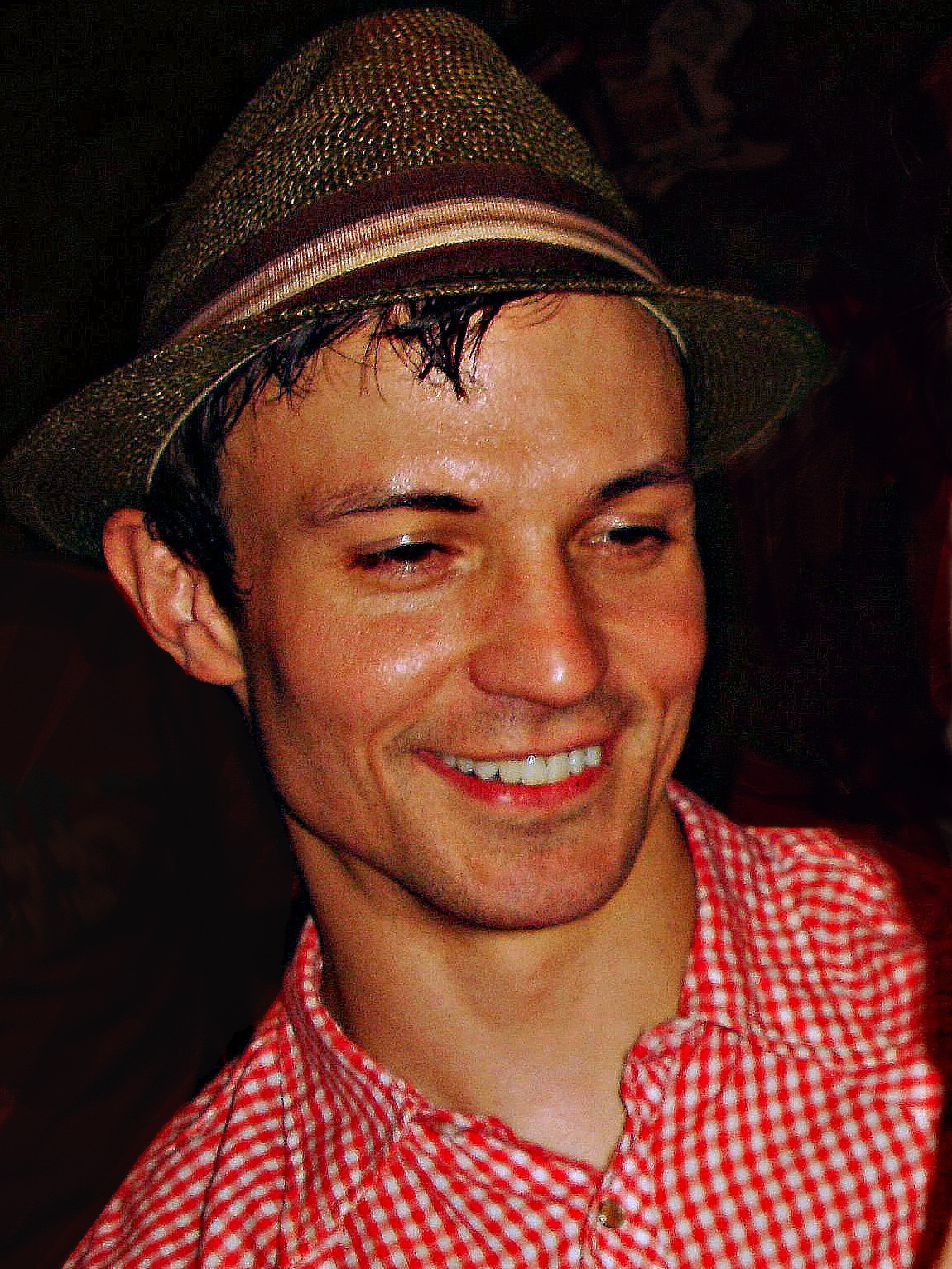
Bradford Scobie in 2008

Bradford Scobie is a New York City-based American performance artist and comedian who performs one-man musical comedy routines.

== Doctor Donut ==
Scobie is known for his onstage persona as the supervillain Doctor Donut. In this role, Scobie wears a dirty white leotard, blackened teeth, a massive false eyebrow and mustache and an éclair hanging down the front of his crotch. A giant donut with the words "Doctor Donut" is placed on his head, with fake donuts hanging all over his body.

New York media including L Magazine, The Village Voice and The New York Times covered Scobie's character. As this character, Scobie appeared alongside other artists from Manhattan's arts scene in Shortbus, a 2006 American comedy-drama film written and directed by John Cameron Mitchell.

== Other characters ==
Other characters created by Scobie include the clown Ukulele Louie, the "spitty and adorable man-child" Bratwurst, and Cousin Rooster, a hillbilly who has sex with chickens. As Zombie Ralph he worked as "Master of Scare-a-Moanies" for "BOO-LESQUE WITH ZOMBIE RALPH", a Halloween-themed show at Joe's Pub in 2008. For the last ten years, Scobie has performed his burlesque emcee character, the dandy gent Sir Richard Castle, at New York's Slipper Room.

== Additional credits ==
Gas Huffin' Bad Gals!, a film written by and starring Scobie, was accepted into the Cannes Film Festival, the New York Underground Film Festival, the Outfest festival in Los Angeles, and was aired on BBC television in England. Scobie is one of the founding members of the sketch comedy group Chucklebucket and played the husband in the comedy lounge act, "Vance & Lorna".
