= The Joan Ganz Cooney Center =

Joan Ganz Cooney Center at Sesame Workshop
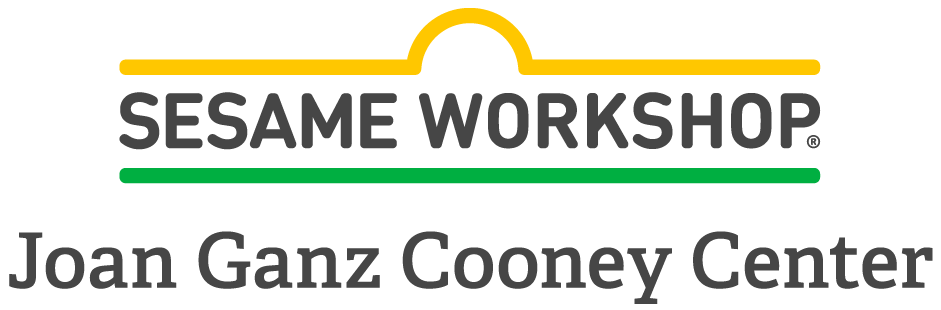
- Founded: February 5, 2007
- Legal status: 501(c)(3) nonprofit organization
- Purpose: To advance children's literacy skills and foster innovation in children's learning through digital media.
- Headquarters: New York City
- Website: www.joanganzcooneycenter.org

The Joan Ganz Cooney Center (informally, the Cooney Center) is an independent, non-profit, non-partisan research and innovation group founded by Sesame Workshop to advance children's literacy skills and foster innovation in children's learning through digital media.

== Background ==
The Joan Ganz Cooney Center was founded in 2007 to study the role of digital technologies in promoting childhood literacy, particularly among elementary school age children.

== Activities ==
The Cooney Center focuses on research, new technologies, and catalyzing policy change. Its activities comprise three primary themes:

- Literacy by Ten: The Cooney Center co-authored Pioneering Literacy in the Digital Wild West: Empowering Parents and Educators, a 2012 report that has been used by literacy researchers from Stanford University and others around the globe. It was the result of a partnership with the Campaign for Grade Level Reading, led by the Annie E. Casey Foundation, to develop analyses and an action plan to raise literacy rates in America. In 2013, the Cooney Center partnered with the National Center for Families Learning (formerly the National Center for Family Literacy) to form the Aprendiendo Juntos Council, which focuses on improving literacy rates among Spanish-speaking American children.
- Digital Play: The Cooney Center has released and contributed to a number of reports and surveys on the connection between games and learning. In 2009, with support from the Robert Wood Johnson Foundation, the Cooney Center published Game Changer: Investing in Digital Play to Advance Learning and Health, which was used in a 2011 testimony to the United States House of Representatives Committee on Science, Space, and Technology. In 2010, the center offered a prize to top innovators in the field of children's digital learning and in 2011, the Cooney Center organized the first annual National STEM Video Game Competition. More recently, in February 2014, the Cooney Center launched GamesandLearning.org, a news site reporting on the latest in the field of educational gaming.
- Learning Together: The Cooney Center is the convener of the Families and Media Research Consortium, which also includes as members AARP, Sesame Workshop, Northwestern University, Arizona State University, and Stanford University. As part of the Families and Media Project, the consortium released a series of reports, the first of which was released on January 24, 2014, by the Cooney Center. For Learning at Home: Families' Educational Media Use in America, the Cooney Center collected data from parents of young children encompassing a variety of ethnicities and backgrounds to assess "the new family media ecology that is shaping interactions in every community in the U.S. and around the globe." The report garnered major media attention.

The Cooney Center also hosts periodic events aimed at catalyzing policy and industry change. The 2009 Leadership Forum: Breakthrough Learning in a Digital Age, hosted at the Googleplex, attracted more than 200 thought leaders from the research, policy, education, and industries. In 2011, the Cooney Center hosted its annual leadership forum focusing on scaling up effective models that support children's learning with an emphasis on harnessing the largely untapped potential of digital media, especially for struggling learners. Learning From Hollywood: Can Entertainment Media Ignite a Digital Revolution? brought together leaders from the creative media industries, education, research, policy, and philanthropy. Recent research publications on the potential of video games and mobile platforms for children's learning have received wide attention in the media and among national and state policymakers.

== Reports ==
The Cooney Center disseminates research that informs national debates, with the intention of "stimulating investment in effective reforms." It does so through its publications on timely topics, including the children's fast evolving, interactive media landscape, mobile learning, and the debates over media multitasking. The Cooney Center's inaugural report was The Power of Pow! Wham!: Children, Digital Media and Our Nation's Future by Rima Shore, Ph.D.

In 2014, the Cooney Center published Learning at Home: Families' Educational Media Use in America. For this national survey, data was collected from 1,577 parents on the amount of media used in their home and its educational value. "What is more, the study, by the Joan Ganz Cooney Center," reported the New York Times, "shows that as children spend more time with screens as they get older, they spend less time doing educational activities, with 8- to 10-year-olds spending about half the time with educational content that 2- to 4-year-olds do."

=== Significant reports ===
- Digital Play for Global Citizens by Jordan Shapiro (2018)
- Opportunity for All? Technology and Learning in Lower-Income Families by Victoria Rideout and Vikki Katz (2016)
- Getting a Read on the App Stores: A Market Scan and Analysis of Children's Literacy Apps by Sarah Vaala, Anna Ly, and Michael H. Levine (2015)
- Diverse Families and Media: Using Research to Inspire Design by Amber Levinson, Sinem Siyahhan, Briana Pressey, and Katie Headrick Taylor (2015)
- Tap, Click, Read: Growing Readers in a World of Screens by Lisa Guernsey and Michael H. Levine (2015)
- Apps en familia: Guîa para usar apps con tus hijos by the Joan Ganz Cooney Center (2015)
- Aprendiendo en Casa: Media as a Learning Tool among Hispanic-Latino Families by June Lee and Brigid Barron (2015)
- Digital Media and Latino Families: New Channels for Learning, Parenting, and Organizing by Bruce Fuller, José Ramón Lizárraga, James H. Gray (2015)
- Connecting to Learn: Promoting Digital Equity for America's Hispanic Families by Vikki S. Katz and Michael H. Levine (2015)
- Family Time with Apps: A Guide to Usings Apps with Your Kids by the Joan Ganz Cooney Center (2014)
- Level Up Learning: A National Survey on Teaching With Digital Games by Lori Takeuchi, PhD, Sarah Vaala, PhD (2014)
- The Mindshift Guide to Games and Learning by Jordan Shapiro (2014)
- Learning at Home: Families' Educational Media Use in America by Victoria Rideout. (2014)
- Games for a Digital Age: K-12 Market Map and Investment Analysis by John Richards, Leslie Stebbins and Kurt Moellering. (2013)
- Pioneering Literacy in the Digital Wild West: Empowering Parents and Educators by Lisa Guernsey, Michael H. Levine, Cynthia Chiong & Maggie Stevens. (2012)
- Kids Online: A new research agenda for understanding social networking forums by Sara Grimes and Deborah Fields. (2012)
- What in the World Happened to Carmen Sandiego? The Edutainment Era: Debunking Myths and Sharing Lessons Learned by Carly Shuler. (2012)
- National Survey and Video Case Studies: Teacher Attitudes about Digital Games in the Classroom by Jessica Millstone. (2012)
- iLearn II: An Analysis of the Education Category on Apple’s App Store by Carly Shuler. (2012)
- The New Coviewing: Designing for Learning through Joint Media Engagement by Lori Takeuchi and Reed Stevens. (2011)
- Take a Giant Step: A Blueprint for Teaching Young Children in a Digital Age by Brigid Barron, et al. (2011)
- Families Matter: Designing Media for a Digital Age by Lori Takeuchi. (2011)
- Always Connected: The new digital media habits of young children by Aviva Lucas Gutnick, Michael Robb, Lori Takeuchi and Jennifer Kotler. (2011)
- Learning: Is there an app for that? by Cynthia Chiong & Carly Shuler. (2010)
- Can Video Games Promote Intergenerational Play & Literacy Learning? by Cynthia Chiong Ph.D. (2010)
- iLearn: A Content Analysis of the iTunes App Store's Education Section by Carly Shuler, Ed.M. (2010)
- Game Changer: Investing in Digital Play to Advance Children's Learning and Health by Ann My Thai et al. (2010)
- Pockets of Potential: Using Mobile Technologies to Promote Children's Learning by Carly Shuler, Ed.M. (2010)
- Getting Over the Slump: Innovation Strategies to Promote Children's Learning by James Paul Gee, PhD (2010)

== Initiatives ==
The Cooney Center focuses on four key strategies: action research, innovation and model development, partnership building and dissemination. These strategies reflect the center's field-building mission, which calls for the creation of new knowledge, the creative application of that knowledge in practice, and the engagement of key decision-makers in making investments to drive innovation and scale up what works.

=== By/With/For Youth: Inspiring Next Gen Public Media Audiences ===
Sponsored by the Corporation for Public Broadcasting, By/With/For Youth: Inspiring Next Gen Public Media Audiences is a research and development project that works to support the public media sector as it evolves to engage tween and teen audiences. In an effort to spur innovation among public media stations, the Cooney Center launched the Next Gen Accelerator program, which provides small grants to 12 local television and radio stations to pilot efforts to engage youth audiences.

=== National STEM Video Game Competition ===
The Cooney Center, in collaboration with E-Line Media, hosts the National STEM Video Game Challenge as part of the "Educate to Innovate" campaign, which President Barack Obama launched in November 2009 to "harness the excitement and educational potential of video games to advance STEM learning (science, technology, engineering, and math)."

=== Cooney Center Fellows Program ===
Cooney Center Fellows assist with high priority research, program development and dissemination activities that examine the potential and challenges associated with digital media applications in promoting children's learning and healthy development. In addition, the center has established a research fund to help support priority areas.

=== Digital Age Teacher Preparation Council ===
The Cooney Center, in collaboration with the Stanford Educational Leadership Institute, convened a Digital Age Teacher Preparation Council, co-chaired by Linda Darling-Hammond of Stanford University and Michael Levine. The council's sixteen members from academia, industry, and policy assessed current practices in early education and elementary school teaching and designed a professional development "blueprint" to advance the use of effective digital media in teaching and learning, with a special emphasis on instruction for underserved students. The final report was issued on November 1, 2011.

== People at the Cooney Center ==
=== Founders ===
- Joan Ganz Cooney, Chairman of the Executive Committee, Sesame Workshop
- Lloyd N. Morrisett, Chairman Emeritus of the Board, Sesame Workshop
- Gary E. Knell Former President and CEO, Sesame Workshop, Current CEO, National Geographic Society
- Michael H. Levine, PhD, Founding Executive Director

=== Key staff ===
- Michael Preston, PhD, Executive Director
- Lori Takeuchi, PhD, Deputy Director & Head of Research
- Catherine Jhee, director, Strategic Communications
