= Andrew & Polly =

Andrew Barkan and Polly Hall write and perform music for children under the name Andrew & Polly. In 2012, they received the Joe Raposo Children's Music Award from The ASCAP Foundation for their song "When You're a Dog." They accepted the award and performed the song at the 17th Annual ASCAP Foundation Awards on December 12, 2012, at Jazz at Lincoln Center in New York where Jason Mraz also performed and received an award.

"When You're a Dog" spent seven consecutive weeks on the Sirius XM Kids Place Live 13 under 13 chart, rising to number two for the week ending June 28, 2013. In 2020, they composed the music for the Noggin television series Yoga Friends.

In November 2023, they were nominated for Best Children's Album at the 66th Grammys (2024) for their album Ahhhhh!

The duo lives in Santa Monica and cites The Muppets, Joe Wise, The Beatles and The Electric Company as influences. Their recordings and performances feature instruments including mandolin, ukulele, accordion, mouth trumpet and teeth hi-hats. They perform locally in community spaces as well as in educational settings.
