= Naomi Schaefer Riley =

American journalist and writer

- Born: Naomi Schaefer; 1976 or 1977 (age 49–50)
- Education: Harvard College
- Occupations: Lecturer, non-fiction writer, editor, and blogger
- Spouse: Jason Riley (m. 2004)
- Children: 3
- Website: naomiriley.com

Naomi Schaefer Riley (née Schaefer; born c. 1977) is an American conservative commentator and author. Her writings have appeared in the Wall Street Journal, The New York Times, The Boston Globe, The Los Angeles Times, The New York Post, and The Washington Post, among others. At The Wall Street Journal, she covered religion, higher education, and philanthropy for the editorial page. Prior to this assignment, she founded the magazine In Character.

Riley was a blogger for the Chronicle of Higher Education until she was fired in 2012 after writing a blog arguing for the elimination of Black Studies at university departments, which resulted in a social media backlash, kicked off by an essay by Tressie McMillan Cottom and a petition demanding her firing, which contained roughly 6,500 names.

A Fellow of the American Enterprise Institute, she has made several appearances on C-SPAN.

== Personal life ==
She graduated from Harvard College in 1998, magna cum laude. She and her husband (since 2004), Jason Riley, have three children.

== Writing ==
- God on the Quad: How Religious Colleges and the Missionary Generation Are Changing America, Ivan R. Dee (2006); ISBN 978-1566636988
- The Faculty Lounges … And Other Reasons Why You Won't Get the College Education You Pay For, Ivan R. Dee (2011); ISBN 978-1566638869
- Acculturated: 23 Savvy Writers Find Hidden Virtue in Reality TV, Chic Lit, Video Games, and Other Pillars of Pop Culture (co-editor), Templeton Press (2012); ISBN 978-1599474045
- 'Til Faith Do Us Part: How Interfaith Marriage is Transforming America, Oxford University Press (2013); ISBN 978-0199873746
- Opportunity and Hope: Transforming Children's Lives through Scholarships, Rowman & Littlefield Publishers (2014); ISBN 978-1442226098
- Got Religion?: How Churches, Mosques, and Synagogues Can Bring Young People Back, Templeton Press (2014); ISBN 978-1599473918
- The New Trail of Tears: How Washington Is Destroying American Indians, Encounter Books (2016); ISBN 978-1594038532
