= Jason Harris Katz =

American voice actor

- Occupations: Voice actor; television host
- Years active: 1993–present

Jason Harris Katz is an American voice actor and former television host. He was the host of the short-lived Double Dare 2000 on Nickelodeon. He was also the host of Nickelodeon's Big Help on the Road in the late 1990s. He appeared on Codename: Kids Next Door voicing the character Chad Dickson/Numbuh 274 and in a commercial for Olive Garden. In 2002, Harris voiced Bill Dickey in the failed Adult Swim pilot, Welcome to Eltingville. He also did several minor voices in the video game Destroy All Humans! 2, and he voiced Top Cat from 2011 to 2015.

Harris had a voice-acting role in Turok as Carter and starred in the film Top Cat: The Movie, providing English dub voices for Top Cat, Choo-Choo, Brain, Griswald, Strickland, and Big Gus.

== Filmography ==
Year	Title	Notes	Role
1993	Iria: Zeiram the Animation	Voice role	Komimasa
1996	My My Mai	Voice role English dub	Ryouichi Kodou
2000	Double Dare 2000	Game show	Himself; Host
2001	Law & Order: Special Victims Unit	1 episode "Folly"	Leo the Photographer
2001	Mergers & Acquisitions		Jonathan
2001	Jak and Daxter: The Precursor Legacy	Voice role Video game	Yellow Sage
2002	Welcome to Eltingville	Voice role	Bill Dickey/Marv
2002	The Cat Returns	English dub	Additional Voices
2002	The Guru		Josh's Assistant
2002	Red Faction II	Voice role Video game	Shrike, E3 Demo
2002	What's New, Scooby-Doo?	Voice role 1 episode, "Riva Ras Regas"	Announcer / Flapjack
2003	Tony Hawk's Underground	Video game	Additional voices
2003	The Wedding Video	Short film	Kevin Dillon
2002–08	Codename: Kids Next Door	Voice role 10 episodes	Various characters and Chad Dickson aka Numbuh 274
2005	Duck Dodgers	1 episode	Football Player / Wayne
2005	Clubhouse	Episode: "Player Rep"	Office Worker
2005	Here Comes Peter Cottontail: The Movie	Voice role	Bee/Worker Bunny
2005	Chicken Little		Additional voices
2006	The Wild	Voice role	Nelson
2006	Codename: Kids Next Door - Operation Z.E.R.O.	Voice role TV movie	Chad Dickson
2006	Everyone's Hero	Voice role	Announcer
2006	Destroy All Humans! 2	Voice role Video game	Astronaut "Biff" / American Men / Additional Voices
2006	Casper's Scare School	Voice role TV movie	Gargoyle/Flyboy/Skinny Ghost/Coach
2006	The Sopranos: Road to Respect	Voice role Video game	Additional voices
2006	Blazing Angels: Squadrons of WWII	Video game	Frank
2007	Life and Times in Reality Stardom	Short film	Chad Burns
2007	Reservation Road		Podcast (voice)
2007	Bee Movie Game	Voice role Video game	Adam Flayman
2008	Turok	Voice role Video game	Carter
2008	Bachelor Party 2: The Last Temptation	Voice role Video	Voice Actor
2008	Space Chimps	Voice role	Guard
2008	The Bold and the Beautiful	1 episode	Radio Announcer
2008	Quantum of Solace	Video game	Additional Voices
2009	Jasper Goes to Bishop	Voice role TV film	Donkey
2009	Sinkhole	Short film	Broker
2009	Thor at the Bus Stop		Abe
2009	Everybody's Fine		Cab Rider #1
2010	Damages	Episodes: "I Look Like Frankenstein" and "The Dog Is Happier Without Her"	Bloomberg Reporter / Radio Announcer (both uncredited)
2010	Gaturro	English dub Unreleased in the U.S.	Max Garcia Aristizabal
2010	Despicable Me: The Video Game	Video game	Vector
2010	Quantum Quest: A Cassini Space Odyssey	Voice role	Announcer
2010	Jasper: A Christmas Caper	Voice role Video short	Moxie
2011	Jasper: A Precious Valentine	Voice role Video short	Moxie
2011	Lucky		Radio DJ (uncredited)
2011	Top Cat: The Movie	Voice role Mexican animated film English dub	Top Cat / Choo Choo / Brain / Griswald / Lou Strickland / Big Gus
2011	Jasper: A Turkey Tale	Voice role Short video	Moxie/Okie Dokey
2011	The Nanny Interviews	2 episodes "Pilot" and "The Post-Baby Shower Interview"	Brandon
2011	Star Wars: The Old Republic	Video game	Additional voices
2012–13	The Legend of Korra	Voice role 6 episodes	Ring Announcer / Additional Voices
2012	Jasper: A Fabulous Fourth	Voice role Video short	Moxie/Okie Dokey
2012	Ice Age: Continental Drift		Additional voices
2012	Foodfight!	Voice role	Hairless Hamster Henchman
2013	Henry & Me		Additional Voices
2013	Team Umizoomi	Voice role	Big Trouble
2014	Rio 2	Voice role	Old Bird
2014	The Legend of Korra	Video game	Ring Announcer
2015	Top Cat Begins	Voice role	Top Cat / Choo Choo / Brain
2015–present	Angelo Rules	Voice role English dub	Geezer / Damien Burst / Coach Zonka

Preceded by Tom Kenny	Voice of Top Cat; 2011-2015	Succeeded by Thomas Lennon
Preceded by Tom Kenny	Voice of Choo Choo; 2011-2015	Succeeded by Jenny Lorenzo
Preceded by Leo De Lyon	Voice of Brain; 2011-2015	Succeeded by Georgie Kidder
