= Michael H. Levine =

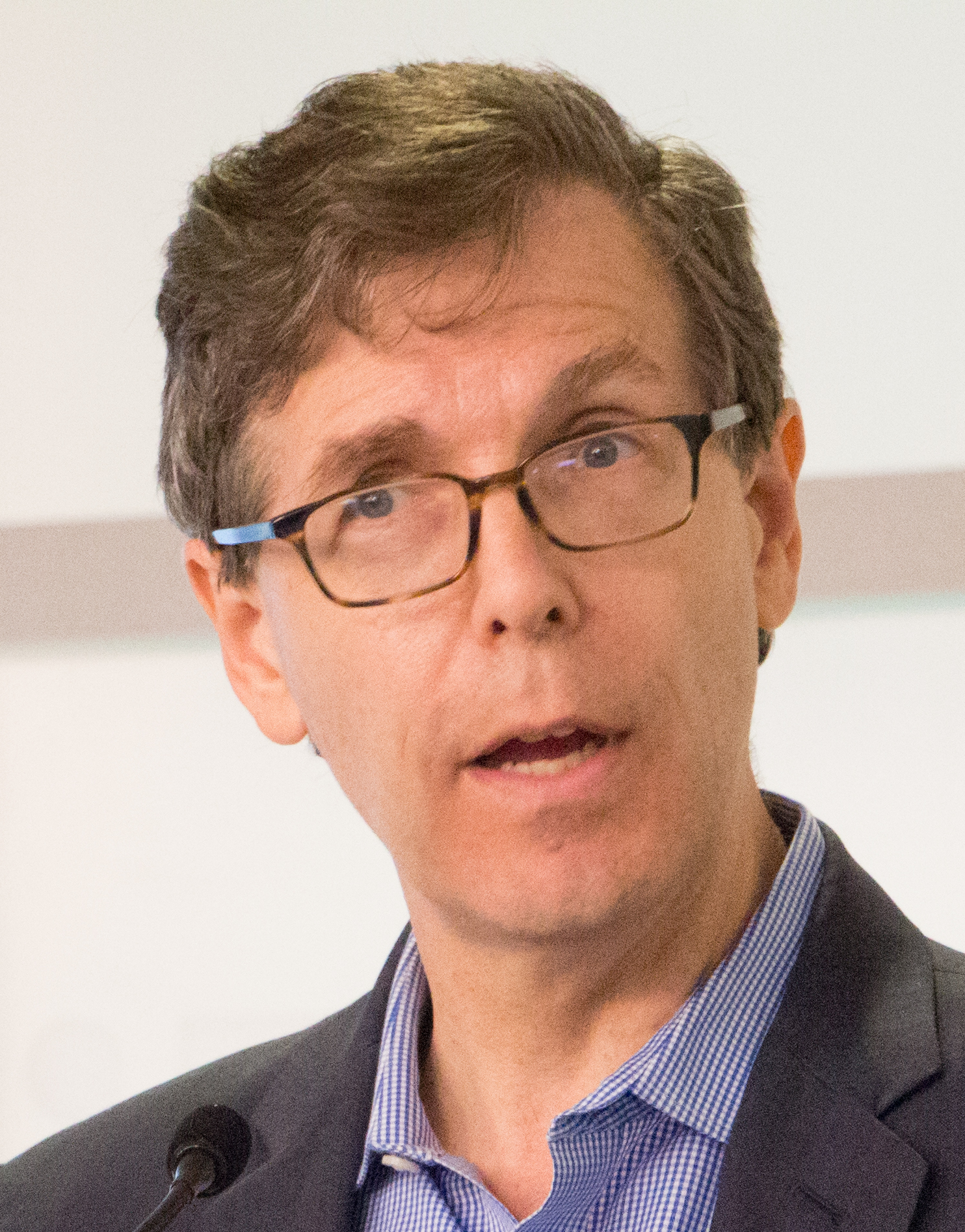
- Michael H. Levine addresses the Family Engagement and Early Literacy Summer Institute
- Occupation: child educator

Michael H. Levine is Senior Vice President at Nickelodeon where he is leading learning and social impact work at Noggin, an industry leader in early childhood education. Previously he was founding executive director of the Joan Ganz Cooney Center, an independent research group founded by Sesame Workshop focused on fostering innovation in children's learning through digital media and Sesame Workshop’s first Chief Knowledge Officer.

== Early life and education ==
Levine grew up in New York City, where he attended William Cullen Bryant High School. He received a B.S. from Cornell University in Industrial and Labor Relations and a Ph.D. in Social Policy from Brandeis University's Florence Heller Graduate School. While at Cornell he studied with developmental psychologist Urie Bronfenbrenner and was the youngest member of a research team that included current leaders in family support and children's policy programs including Dr. Heather Weiss, founder of Harvard's Family Research Project.

== Career ==
Prior to founding the Cooney Center, Levine served as Vice President of New Media and Executive Director of Education for Asia Society, managing interactive media and educational initiatives to promote understanding of Asia and other world regions, languages, and cultures. Previously, he oversaw the Carnegie Corporation of New York's work in early childhood development, educational media, and primary grades reform as Deputy Chair and Senior Program Officer. Levine also served as a senior assistant to the New York City Schools Chancellor, where he directed dropout prevention, after-school, and early childhood initiatives. In 2014 he was invited to join the inaugural class of Disruptor Foundation Fellows, alongside Common Sense Media founder Jim Steyer and Matthew Stepka of Google.org.

=== Policy work ===
Levine has been an adviser to several government agencies including the White House, the U.S. Department of Education, PBS, and the Corporation for Public Broadcasting, and writes frequently for policy-oriented and media industry audiences including The Huffington Post, Democracy Journal, and Education Week. He also occasionally appears at public events to speak on the topic of education and media, most notably at TEDxAtlanta in 2010, 2013 BETT Awards, at the Cooney Center's inaugural symposium Logging Into the Playground and, more recently, at the Young Learners Congress and Expo in Sydney, Australia. Through the Cooney Center, Levine has convened forums on education and policy, such as Learning From Hollywood and Learning at Home. Levine serves on numerous nonprofit boards and advisory councils, including Forum for Youth Investment, Teach For America, We Are Family Foundation, Classroom, Inc, and the Léman School. In April 2014, former Governor of North Carolina Bev Perdue announced her appointment of Dr. Levine to DigiLEARN's Board of Directors.

=== Select publications ===
- Guernsey, L, & Levine, M.H. Tap, Click, Read: Growing Readers in A World of Screens. San Francisco: Jossey Bass, 2015.
- Levine, M. H., Takeuchi, L., & Vaala S. E. (2014). Blumberg, F. Games in a Digital Age: Supporting a New Ecology of Learning. In Blumberg, F. (Ed.), Learning by playing: Frontiers of video gaming in education. New York: Oxford University Press.
- Levine, M. & Vaala, S. E. Games for Learning: Vast Wasteland or a Digital Promise?. In Blumberg, F., & Fisch, S. M. (Eds.), Digital games: A context for cognitive development (pp. 71–82). San Francisco: Jossey-Bass.
- Barron, B., Cayton-Hodges, G., Bofferding, L., Copple, C., Darling-Hammond, L., & Levine, M. (2011). Take a Giant Step: A Blueprint for Teaching Children in a Digital Age. New York: The Joan Ganz Cooney Center at Sesame Workshop
- Gee, J.P., & Levine, M.H. (September 2011). "The Digital Teachers Corps: Closing America's Literacy Gap." Progressive Policy Institute. Retrieved from: http://progressivepolicy.org/wp-content/uploads/2011/09/09.2011-Levine_Gee-The_Digital_Teachers_Corps.pdf
- Guernsey, L., Levine M., Chiong C., and Severns M (November 2012) "Pioneering Literacy: In the Digital Wild West: Empowering Parents and Educators: http://www.joanganzcooneycenter.org/publication/pioneering-literacy/
- Santo, Rafi & Levine, M. (2013) "Upgrading Afterschool: Common Sense Shifts in Expanded Learning for a Digital Age." Expanding Minds and Opportunities: Leveraging the Power of Afterschool and Summer Learning for Student Success. Collaborative Communications Group. Expanding Minds and Opportunities: Leveraging the Power of Afterschool and Summer Learning for Student Success. Collaborative Communications Group, 3 Feb. 2013. Web. 31 Jan. 2014.
- Levine, M. H. (November 2005) "Take a Giant Step: Investing in Preschool Education In Emerging Nations." Phi Delta Kappan 87(no. 3): p. 196-200. Abstract
- Levine, M. H., & Gershenfeld, A.,(11 October 2010). "Scaling Up a Videogame-learning Link - Isn't It Time We Leveled Up" Education Week. Retrieved from http://www.edweek.org/ew/articles/2011/11/09/11levine.h31.html
- Levine, M.H., & Wojcicki, E. (6 September 2010). "Teaching for a Shared Future: Think Global." Education Week. Retrieved from: http://www.edweek.org/ew/articles/2010/10/13/07levine_ep.h30.html
- Levine, M. and Gee, J.P.(Spring 2009). "TV Guidance." Democracy Journal(12). Retrieved from https://web.archive.org/web/20120516185919/http://www.democracyjournal.org/12/6673.php
- Stevens, H. (September 2012) "Bringing up the iKid generation: How to incorporate tech into your children's lives".
- Thai, A., Lowenstein, D., Ching, D., & Rejeski, D., Foreword in Game Changer: Investing in Digital Play to Advance Children's Learning and Health. (2009). New York: The Joan Ganz Cooney Center at Sesame Workshop.
