= 7th Asia Pacific Screen Awards =

- Date: 15 December 2013
- Site: Brisbane; Australia

Highlights
- Best Film: Omar
- Best Actor: Lee Byung-hun
- Best Actress: Zhang Ziyi

The 7th Asia Pacific Screen Awards were held in Brisbane, Australia on 15 December 2013.

== Awards ==
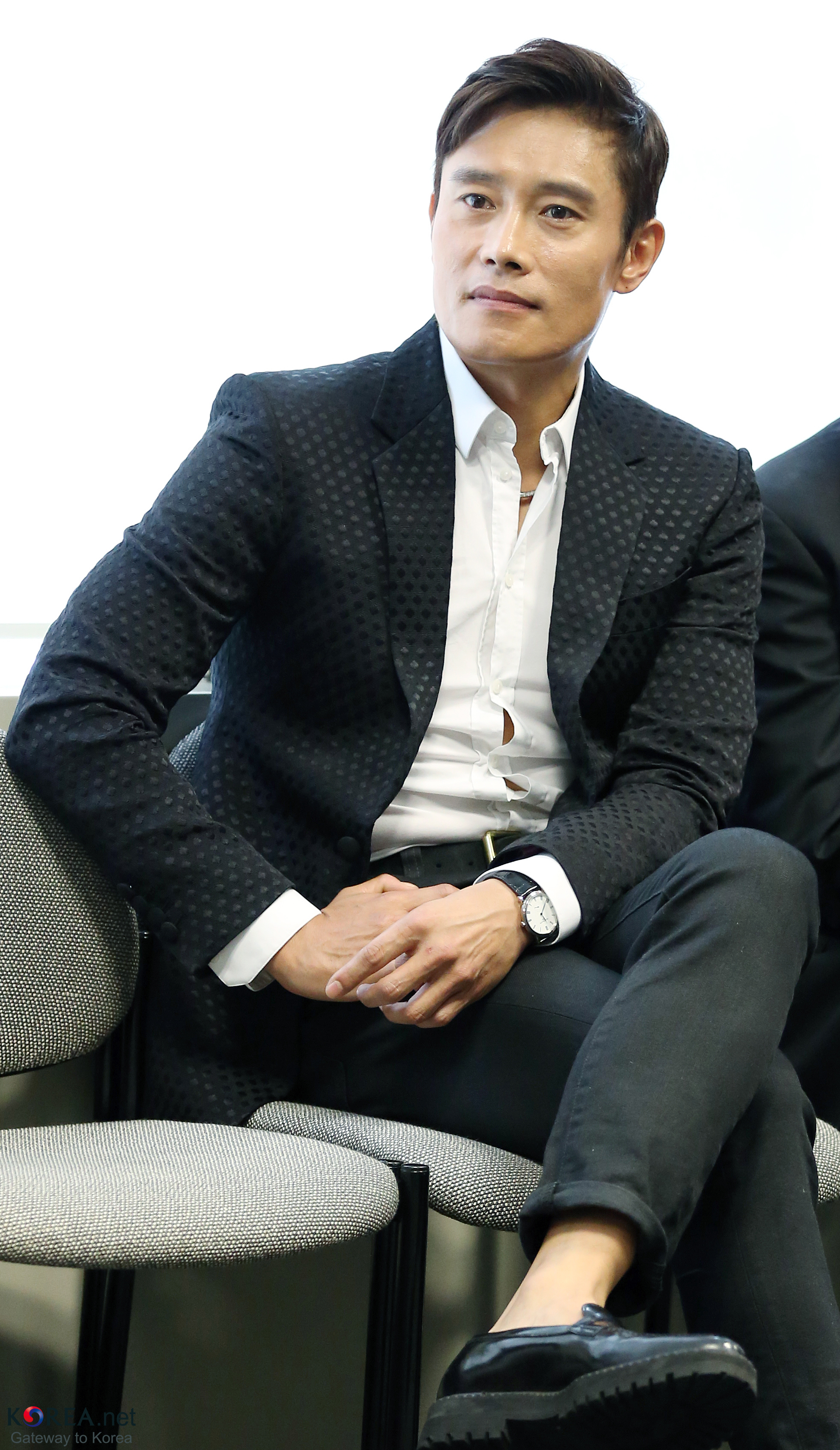
Lee Byung-hun, Best Actor winner.

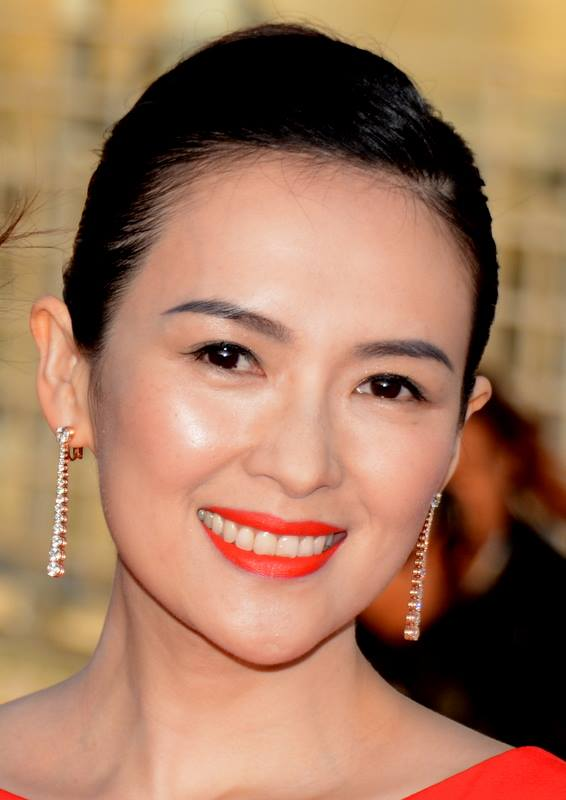
Zhang Ziyi, Best Actress winner.

Best Feature Film	Achievement in Directing
(Palestine) Omar: (Japan) Like Father, Like Son; (Iran) The Past; (Australia) The Turning; (Sri Lanka) With You, Without You	(Singapore) Anthony Chen - Ilo Ilo: (Kazakhstan) Emir Baighazin - Harmony Lessons; (Iraq) Huner Saleem - My Sweet Pepper Land; (Japan) Hirokazu Koreeda - Like Father, Like Son; (Iran) Shahram Mokri - Fish & Cat
Best Actor	Best Actress
(South Korea) Lee Byung-hun - Masquerade: (Australia) Aaron Pedersen - Mystery Road; (Palestine) Adam Bakri - Omar; Tatsuya Nakadai - Japan's Tragedy; (Kazakhstan) Erbulat Toguzakov - The Old Man	(China) Zhang Ziyi - The Grandmaster: (New Zealand) Whirimako Black - White Lies; (Turkey) Ayça Damgaci - Yozgat Blues; (Iran) Golshifteh Farahani - My Sweet Pepper Land; (Iran) Negar Javaherian - The Painting Pool
Best Screenplay	Best Cinematography
(India) Ritesh Batra - The Lunchbox: (Iran) Asghar Farhadi - The Past; (Russia) Denis Osokin - Celestial Wives of the Meadow Mari; (Bangladesh) Mostofa Sarwar Farooki, Anisul Hoque - Television; (Malaysia) U-Wei Haji Saari - Almayer's Folly	(China) Lü Yue - Back to 1942: (Palestine) Ehab Assal - Omar; (Australia) Mandy Walker - Tracks; (Kazakhstan) Murat Aliyev - The Old Man; (India) Rajeev Ravi - Monsoon Shootout
Best Animated Feature Film	Best Documentary Feature Film
(Russia) Ku! Kin-dza-dza: (Japan) Patema Inverted; (South Korea) The Fake; (Japan) The Wind Rises; (India) The World of Goopi and Bagha	(Indonesia) The Act of Killing: (Israel) The Gatekeepers; (India) Menstrual Man; (Lebanon) A World Not Ours; (Afghanistan) No Burqas Behind Bars
Best Youth Feature Film	UNESCO Award
(South Korea) Juvenile Offender: (Japan) Leaving on the 15th Spring; (New Zealand) Shopping; (Saudi Arabia) Wadjda; (Palestine) When I Saw You	(Iran) The Painting Pool
FIAPF Award	Jury Grand Prize
(South Korea) Lee Choon-yun	(Bangladesh) Television (India) The Lunchbox

=== Films and countries with multiple nominations ===
Films that received multiple nominations
Nominations	Film
3	Omar
2	Like Father, Like Son
2	My Sweet Pepper Land
2	Television
2	The Lunchbox
2	The Old Man
2	The Painting Pool
2	The Past

Countries that received multiple nominations
Awards	Country
6	Japan
6	Iran
5	India
4	Palestine
4	South Korea
3	Australia
3	Kazakhstan
2	Bangladesh
2	China
2	New Zealand
2	Russia
