= Mohammad Bahrani =

Iranian voice actor

- محمد بحرانی
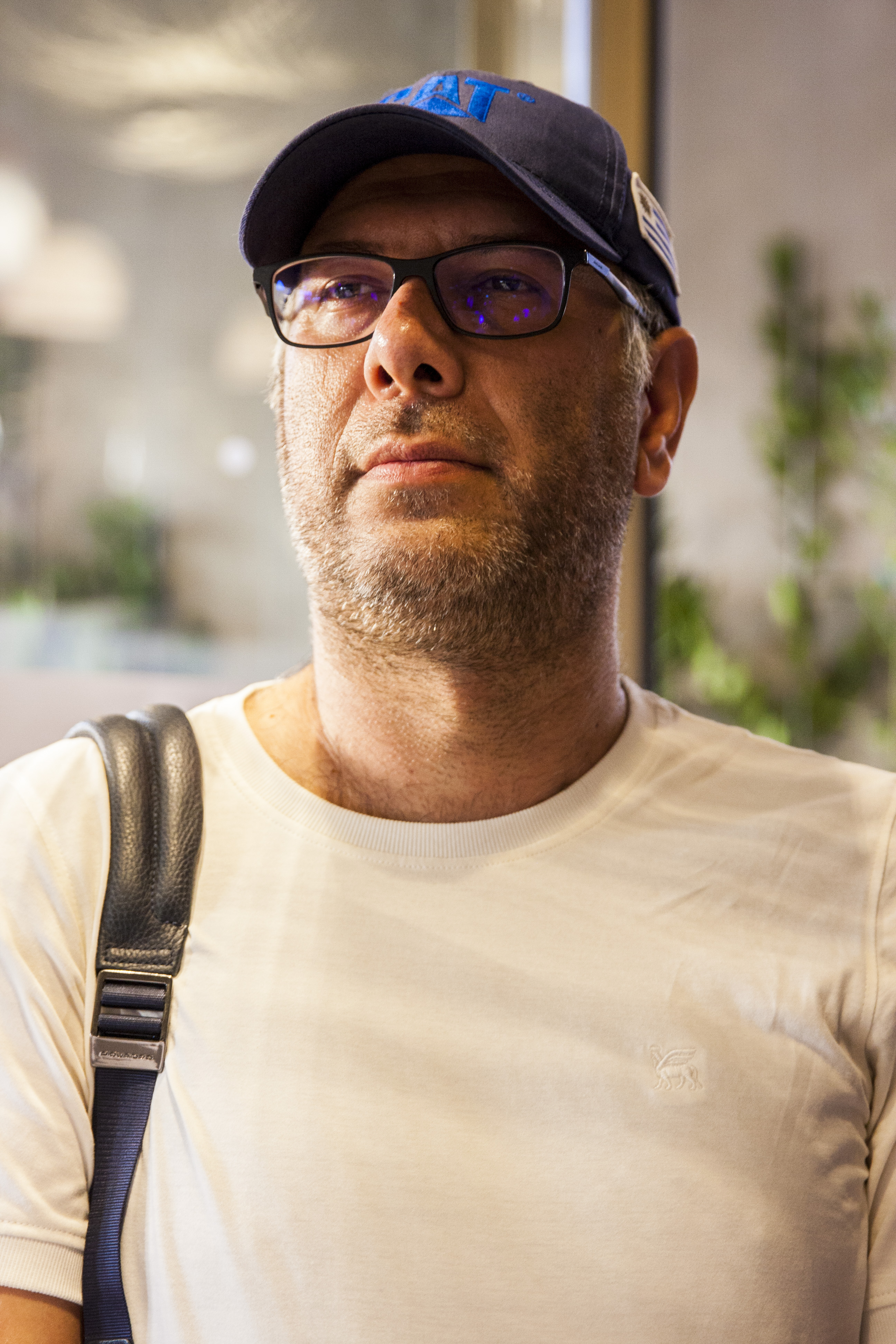
- Bahrani in 2019
- Born: September 11, 1981 (age 44); Shiraz, Iran
- Education: University of Tehran; Tarbiat Modares University
- Occupations: Actor; voice actor; puppeteer; director; poet; host
- Years active: 2001–present
- Spouse: Mahnaz Khatibi

Mohammad Bahrani (Persian: محمد بحرانی Persian pronunciation: [moˈhæmmæd bæhˈrɑːniː]; born September 11, 1981) is an Iranian voice actor, puppeteer, actor, director, presenter, and poet. Best known for his voice acting improvisations as one of the most popular adult puppets in the history of the Iranian television Jenab Khan.

== Early life and career ==
Mohammad Bahrani was born on 11 September 1981 in Shiraz to an English teacher father and a housewife mother. He is the last of their four children; 3 sons and a daughter. His family is originally from Kazerun.

Despite receiving a math and physics diploma, he completed his education with a Bachelor of Arts degree in 2005 from the college of art at the University of Tehran. He entered Tarbiat Modares University, where he completed his Master of Arts degree in 2008. He married one of his classmates and coworker Mahnaz Khatibi in 2006.

He started his career with college theater and puppetry. In one of his performances in a festival, Maryam Sadat (a member of the jury) invited him to take part in Ninimoun (Our Baby), a live television program directed by Bahram ShahMohammadlou.

Since entering the television programs in 2001, Bahrani has participated in numerous puppet projects for children and adults. The Iranian well-known puppet Jenab Khan introduced to television for the first time from a home video series called Morvarid alley. Rambod Javan, a co-star in Morvarid alley, invited Jenab Khan to his variety show Khandevaneh. Bahrani is also known for voice acting as two characters, Aghoye Hamsadeh (Mr. neighbor) and Baabaee, in an Iranian famous children's television program Kolah Ghermezi.

Characterization of Jenab Khan is a product of Bahrani's lived experience; from his childhood in Shiraz with Khouzestan war refugee children to his college dorm experiences. Most of the Jenab Khan dialogues are Bahrani's improvisations. Bahrani is also well known for voice acting as two characters, Aghoye Hamsadeh (Mr. neighbor) and Baabaee, in an Iranian popular children TV series, Kolah Ghermezi, created by Hamid Jebeli and Iraj Tahmasb. He performed as a voice actor in many children TV series such as Ostad-e Hamechidoon (all-knowing Professor), Shahr-e Koudakan (city of children), and Ba ma Kash Bashi (Wish you would be with us).

In addition to voice acting, he, along with Amir Soltan Ahmadi, wrote and performed the music video World Cup in 2014. They once again produced another music video for the 2018 world cup called We are coming to Russia. In this music video, they feature Jenab Khan as the guest-star singer. As an actor, Bahrani appeared in several movies and TV series such as Sly, Tabagheye Haasas, Monster, Golshifteh, and Doping. One of the main parts of his versatile body of works consists of theatre acting and directing.

== Filmography ==
=== Acting ===
==== Film ====
Year	Title	Role	Director
2018	Sly	Meshkati	Kamal Tabrizi
2015	Closer	Mohammadreza	Mostafa Ahmadi
2014	Sensitive Floor	Parviz	Kamal Tabrizi
2007	rafigh bad	Clerk	Abass Ahmadi

==== Television and web ====
Year	Title	Role	Director	Network
2020	Doping	Fereydoon (Shiva's father)	Reza Maghsoodi	IRIB TV3
2020	Bacheh Mahal	Shahram Rezayat	Ahmmad Darvishalipoor	IRIB TV2
2019	The Monster	Mahyar Mehrafzoun	Mehran Modiri	Home video (Filimo, Namava, and TDH Home entertainment)
2018	Golshifte	Zia	Behrooz Shoaibee	Home video
2014	Kerkereh (Louver)		Hadi Hejazifard	IRIB TV3
2011	Maktabkhaneh gheire entefaee		Essa Yosefipoor	IRIB Amoozesh
2006	The Royal Hunt of the Sun (Peter Shaffer)		Farhad Mohandespoor	Tele-Theatre IRIB TV4

==== Theatre ====
Year	Title	Director
2020	Days without rain	Mohammad Bahrani
2018–2019	Bahman Koochik	Mehran nael
2015	chaires	
2014	The Lieutenant of Inishmore (Martin McDonagh)	Morteza Meshkat
2008	déjà vu	Masoud Delkhah
2008	125 Tooman univercity	Bidel's Group
2005	Oedipus	
2004	Jazen bekqam, Jazen naakqam	Amir Soltan Ahmadi
2003	Embassy	
2002	Ahoy Humans	Arjang Farokhpeykar
2000	Magic and Spell	Amir Soltan Ahmadi

=== Directing ===
Year	Title	Note
2020	Roozhaye Bi Baran (Days without rain)	Online
2010	Man Mitavanam (I can)	TV series
2002	Behesht va Zamin (Heaven and earth)	experimental theatre festival

=== Voice acting and puppeteering in theatre ===
Year	Title	Director
2017	Pesare Jangal	ramin kohan
2013	Afsanehye Ah	Anoosh Azizi
2006	concerte hasharat	Maryam Saadat
2004	Dayereh	Hadi Hejazifar
2004	golmin	Mehdi Shahpiree
2003	nafaseh ameegh	Mehdi Shahpiree

=== Voice acting and puppeteering in TV ===
Year	Title	Creator	Character
2014–present	Khandevaneh	Rambod Javan	Jenab Khan
2011–2018	Kolah Ghermezi	Hamid Jebeli, Iraj Tahmasb	Aghoye Hamsadeh (Mr. neighbor) and Baabaee
2015	Berkeye Gando (Gando's pond)	Somayeh Abdollahzadeh	Gando
2014	Kooche Morvarid(Morvarid ally)	Aeed Salarzehi	Jenab Khan
2007–2012	Ostad e Hamehchidoon (All knowing Professor)	Keyhan Shadvar	Ostad e Hamehchidoon (All knowing Professor)
2012	Ba Ma Kash Bashi (wish you would be with us)	Mohammad Allami	Agha Shoja
2011–2012	Madreseye baba Emad1&2 (Baba Emad's school1&2)	Amir Soltan Ahmadi	
2012	Majarahaye Hamoon (Hamoon's adventures)	Somayeh Abdollahzadeh	
2009	Shahr e Kodakan (city of children)	Mohammad Allami	Mokhdan
2009	Manooch & Nonooch	Mohammad Allami	
2009	Fesgheliha	Negar Estakhr	
2008	Mazraeye Bibi (Bibi's farm)	Mohammad Allami	Parviz
2008	Amoo & Mashoo	Mohammad Allami	Amoo
2005	Momo & mimi	Maryam Saadat	

=== Narrating and presenting ===
Year	Title	role	Director	Note
2017	Radio Haft	Presenter		Producer: Mansoor Zabetian, Mohammad Soofi
2017	Razmara Yek Doosieh Maskoot	Narator	Ehsan Emadi	Documentary
2017	Faz	Narator		TV show
2015	Mohakemeh	Narator	Ehsan Emadi	Documentary

=== Singing ===
Year	Title	Note
2020	Main Title Song of Doping Series	Directed by Reza Maghsoodi
2018	One of the vocalists of Lian Music Band	The WOMAD Festival-London
2018	Music video "coming to russia"	To celebrate Iran presence in the World Cup 2018
2015	Music video for Volleyball World League (FIBA)	To celebrate Iran presence in the World League 2015
2014	world cup	A Music Video for 2014 FIFA World Cup, To celebrate Iran presence
2006	Concert e Hasharat (Insects Concert)1&2	Directed by Maryam saadat

=== Lyrics and poetry ===
Year	Title	Note
2014	Lyrics of "World Cup"	A Music Video for 2014 FIFA World Cup, To celebrate Iran presence
2006–2012	Lyrics of All-Knowing Professor's main title song	
2006	Poets of Concert e Hasharat (Insects Concert)1&2	A team work

== Awards and nominations ==
Year	Award	Category	Nominated work	Result
2019	Islamic Republic of Iran Broadcasting Festival	Best voice actor	Khandevane for Jenab Khan	Won
2019	Hafez Awards	Best Comedy Actor	Golshifte	Nominated
2005	Javan Festival	Best Actor	n/2+1	Won; 2nd place
2004	Ostan Marcazi Theatre Festival	Best Actor	Jazen bekqam, Jazen naakqam	Won; 2nd place
2003	Tehran International Puppet Theatre Festival	Best Puppeteer	Golmin	Won; 3rd place
2003	Tehran International Puppet Theatre Festival	Best Voice Actor	Nafas e Ameegh (Deep Breath)	Won; 3rd place
2003	Tehran International Puppet Theatre Festival			Won
2002	Tehran International Puppet Theatre Festival	Best Music	Dayereh (Circle)	Won
2002	Iran Experimental Theatre Festival	Best Director	Heaven and earth	Won

== See also ==
Jenab Khan	Khandevane	Rambod Javan	Mehran Modiri	Dorehami
Kolah Ghermezi	Hamid Jebeli	Iraj Tahmasb	Amir Soltan Ahmadi	Kamal Tabrizi
IRIB Nasim	IRIB TV2	IRIB TV3	IRIB TV4	IRIB Amoozesh
