= Negar Javaherian =

Iranian actress (born 1983)

- نگار جواهریان
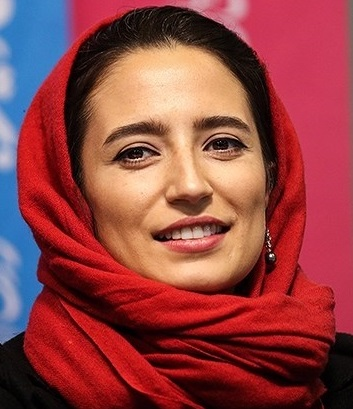
- Javaherian at 2019 Fajr Film Festival
- Born: January 12, 1983 (age 43); Tehran, Iran
- Education: Azad University
- Occupation: Actress
- Years active: 2001–present
- Spouse: Rambod Javan (m. 2016)
- Children: 1

Negar Javaherian (Persian: نگار جواهریان; born January 12, 1983) is an Iranian actress. She is best known for her acting in Gold and Copper (2010), Here Without Me (2011), A Cube of Sugar (2011) and The Painting Pool (2013). She has received various accolades, including a Crystal Simorgh, two Iran Cinema Celebration Awards and an Iran's Film Critics and Writers Association Award, in addition to nominations for two Hafez Awards.

== Early life ==
Negar Javaherian was born on January 12, 1983, in Tehran. She was one of the candidates for the lead role in I, Taraneh, Am 15 (2001), which went to Taraneh Alidoosti, but she played a minor role in the film. She won the Crystal Simorgh for Best Actress at the 28th Fajr Film Festival for her role in Gold and Copper. She also received the Best Actress award at the 14th House of Cinema Celebration for Gold and Copper. Additionally, she dubbed Kristen Stewart’s voice in the Persian version of the film Camp X-Ray (2014).

== Personal life ==
Negar Javaherian married Rambod Javan in 2016. In July 2019, their daughter was born in Canada, and they named her Noordoxt. Javaherian’s presence in Canada during her pregnancy, alongside Javan, with the intention of giving birth there resulting in Canadian citizenship for their child sparked reactions from the public on social media and from various prominent figures in the country, creating controversies surrounding the personal life of this actress and her husband. Ultimately, on July 18, 2019, Noordoxt Javan, the daughter of Negar Javaherian and Rambod Javan, was born in Canada. Previously, Rambod Javan had stated in an interview that he had not traveled to Montreal, Canada, for the screening of the film Murphy’s Law, but coincidentally, the film was screened during his trip.

== Career ==
=== Translation ===
She also co-translated Harold Pinter's play, Betrayal along with Tinouche Nazmjou.

== Filmography ==
=== Film ===
Year	Title	Role	Director	Notes	Ref(s)
2002	I'm Taraneh, 15	Maryam	Rasul Sadrameli		
2004	Ghadamgah	Hananeh	Mohammad Mehdi Asgarpour		
2004	Girls' Dormitory	Shirin	Mohammad Hossein Latifi		
2005	A Few Strands of Hair	Sima	Iraj Karimi		
2007	The Music Box	The Young Girl	Farzad Motamen		
2007	Barefoot in Paradise	Masoumeh	Bahram Tavakoli		
2007	The Magical Generation		Iraj Karimi		
2008	Miss Iran		Saman Moghaddam	Banned and unreleased film	
2008	We Only Live Twice	Shahrzad	Behnam Behzadi		
2008	Shirin	Woman in audience	Abbas Kiarostami		
2008	The Book of Law	Kokab	Maziar Miri		
2010	Gold and Copper	Zahra Sadat	Homayoun As'adian		
2010	Nothing	Leila	Abdolreza Kahani		
2010	The Day Goes and the Night Comes		Keivan Alimohammadi, Omid Bonakdar		
2011	Here Without Me	Yalda	Bahram Tavakoli		
2011	A Cube of Sugar	Pasandideh	Reza Mirkarimi		
2012	Needlessly and Causelessly	Elahe	Abdolreza Kahani		
2013	The Painting Pool	Maryam	Maziar Miri		
2014	The Next Morning	Sahar	Ali Hashemi	Short film	
2014	Tales		Rakhshan Banietemad		
2014	Melbourne	Sara	Nima Javidi		
2015	Temporary		Amir Azizi		
2015	Dowry's Sugar Bowl	Masoumeh	Ali Mollagholipour		
2015	Confessions of My Dangerous Mind	Aida	Houman Seyyedi		
2015	A Minor Leap Down	Nahal	Hamed Rajabi		
2016	Come with Me	She	Shahab Hosseini	Short film	
2016	Duet	Sepideh	Navid Danesh		
2017	Negar	Negar	Rambod Javan		
2018	A Bigger Game	Parastoo	Abbas Nezamdoost		
2019	Gold	Darya	Parviz Shahbazi		
2019	Lovely Trash	The Young Woman	Mohsen Amiryoussefi		
2020	No Choice	Sara Nedaee	Reza Dormishian		

=== Web ===
Year	Title	Role	Director	Platform	Notes	Ref(s)
2021–2022	Once Upon a Time in Iran	Khatoon Bakhtiari	Tina Pakravan	Namava	Leading role	
2025	The Savage	Raha Jahanshahi	Houman Seyyedi	Filmnet	Main role	

=== Television ===
Year	Title	Role	Director	Notes	Network	Ref(s)
2003	This Isn't the Way		Reza Mihandoost	TV series	IRIB TV3	
2006–2007	Under the Blade	Fakhri	Mohammad Reza Honarmand	TV series	IRIB TV1	
2011, 2014	The Red Hat	Herself	Iraj Tahmasb	TV program	IRIB TV2	
2017	Khandevaneh	Herself	Rambod Javan	TV program	IRIB Nasim	

== Theatre ==
Year	Title	Role
2011	Rewards of a repertoire	
2012	The Fourth Wall	
2013	Drama: two clowns and a half	
2016	The Gun is My Honor	Voice
2016	Anton Chekhov's Ivanov	

- Divan-e Theatral – (Directed by Mahmoud Ostad Mohammad)
- Red and the Others – (Directed by Mohammad Yaghoubi)
- Invisible Cities – (Directed by Mohammad Hasan Majouni)
- Where were you on Day the 17th? (Directed by Amir Reza Kouhestani)

== Awards and nominations ==
Name of the award ceremony, year presented, category, nominee of the award, and the result of the nomination
Award	Year	Category	Nominated Work	Result	Ref.
Asia Pacific Screen Awards	2013	Best Performance by an Actress	The Painting Pool	Nominated	
Fajr Film Festival	2010	Best Actress in a Leading Role	Gold and Copper	Won	
Fajr Film Festival	2013	Best Actress in a Leading Role	The Painting Pool	Nominated	
Hafez Awards	2011	Best Actress – Motion Picture	Gold and Copper	Nominated	
Hafez Awards	2014	Best Actress – Motion Picture	The Painting Pool	Nominated	
Iran Cinema Celebration	2008	Best Actress in a Supporting Role	The Book of Law	Nominated	
Iran Cinema Celebration	2010	Best Actress in a Leading Role	Gold and Copper	Won	
Iran Cinema Celebration	2011	Best Actress in a Supporting Role	Here Without Me	Won	
Iran Cinema Celebration	2014	Best Actress in a Leading Role	The Painting Pool	Nominated	
Iran Cinema Celebration	2016	Best Actress in a Leading Role	Dowry's Sugar Bowl	Nominated	
Iran's Film Critics and Writers Association	2011	Best Actress in a Leading Role	Gold and Copper	Won	
Iran's Film Critics and Writers Association	2011	Best Actress in a Supporting Role	Nothing	Nominated	
Iran's Film Critics and Writers Association	2013	Best Actress in a Supporting Role	Needlessly and Causelessly	Nominated	
Les Rimbaud du Cinéma	2021	Best Leading Actress in a Feature Film	A Minor Leap Down	Won	
Mar del Plata International Film Festival	2014	Best Actress	Melbourne	Won	
Osian's Cinefan Festival of Asian and Arab Cinema	2009	Best Actress	We Only Live Twice	Won	
Trans Saharan International Film Festival	2016	Best Actress	A Minor Leap Down	Won	
