= Jenab Khan =

Jenab Khan Persian: جناب خان
- Khandevane character
- First appearance: 2014
- Created by: Mohammad Bahrani
- Portrayed by: Mehdi Borgheyee, Hamed Zabihi
- Voiced by: Mohamad Bahrani

Jenab Khan (Persian: جناب خان) is an Iranian fictional puppet character in IRIB Nasim night show Khandevane hosted by Rambod Javan. Jenab Khan is voiced by Mohammad Bahrani and performed by Mehdi Borghe'ee and Hamed Zabihi.

== Characteristics and personality ==
He is best known for his funny character, Abadanian accent and singing south Iranian songs. He also claims to be the owner of PSG.

35-year-old Jenab Khan loves a girl named Ahlam and has proposed to her on a regular basis since he was 20 years old. His friends are Behnam, Abood and Emad. Neither Ahlam nor his friends weren't shown in the show.

== Appearances and subsequent controversy ==
He first appeared in a video channel program for kids, Kooche Morvarid, (Persian: کوچه مروارید - "The Pearl Alley") as an Abadanian Laboo seller, then joined the 2nd season of the IRIB Nasim night show, Khandevane. He was then abandoned from the show in December 2016, a day before launching the fourth season, due to objections of Saeed Salarzehi, director of Kooche Morvarid, who claimed that the puppet was a property of the original series and has been used illegally. However, he is returning in fifth season due to his rights are bought by IRIB.

== Sources ==
- https://www.tehrantimes.com/news/404034/Khandevaneh-at-Nasim-Studio
- https://www.parsine.com/fa/news/243115/%D8%B1%D8%A7%D8%B2-%D9%85%D8%AD%D8%A8%D9%88%D8%A8%DB%8C%D8%AA-%D8%AC%D9%86%D8%A7%D8%A8-%D8%AE%D8%A7%D9%86
