= Nima Shabannejad =

Iranian actor (born 1987)

- نیما شعبان‌نژاد
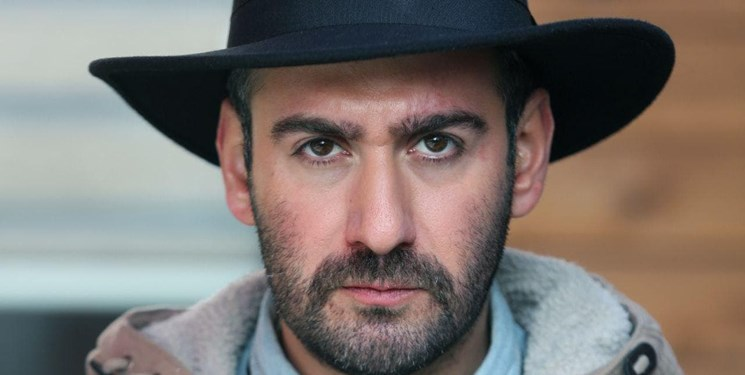
- Shabannejad in 2021
- Born: May 11, 1987 (age 39); Cologne, Germany
- Education: Azad University
- Occupations: Actor; director
- Years active: 2005–present

Nima Shabannejad (Persian: نیما شعبان‌نژاد; also Romanized as Nima Sha'ban Nejad, born May 11, 1987) is an Iranian actor. He rose to prominence for his roles in Khandevaneh (2014–2022). Shabannejad received a Hafez Award nomination for his performance in the comedy series The Secret of Survival (2022).

== Early life ==
He received a bachelor's degree in theatre directing in 2008 from Azad University.

== Filmography ==
=== Film ===
Year	Title	Role	Director	Notes	Ref(s)
2019	Turquzabad		Ali Shah Hatami		
2020	After the Incident		Pouria Heidary Oureh		
2021	A Poetess	Doctor	Saeed Dashti, Sahra Fathi	Short film	
2022	The Future		Amir Pourkian		
2024	Gholhak	Enayat	Mostafa Shayesteh		
2024	Glass House		Amir Pourkian		
2025	The Crooked Cocoon		Hatef Alimardani		
2025	Slow Red	Reza	Ali Jabbarzadeh		

=== Web ===
Year	Title	Role	Director	Platform	Ref(s)
2018–2019	Forbidden	Khalil	Amir Pourkian	Filimo	
2019	Monster	Houshmand Kamrava	Mehran Modiri	Filimo, Namava	
2021	Dracula	Houshmand Kamrava	Mehran Modiri	Filimo, Namava	
2022	The Secret of Survival	Iraj	Saeed Aghakhani	Filmnet	
2022	Cold Blooded	Soroush Moezi	Amir Hossein Torabi	Filmnet	
2023–2024	Schemer	Emad	Ali Yavar	Upera	
2024	Oscar	Himself	Mehran Modiri	Filimo	
2024	Joker	Himself	Ehsan Alikhani, Hamed Mirfatahi	Filimo	

=== Television ===
Year	Title	Role	Director	Network	Ref(s)
2014–2022	Khandevaneh	(various roles)	Rambod Javan	IRIB Nasim	
2018	Don't Set Me Free	Amir	Shahram Shah Hosseini	IRIB TV3	
2020	Doping	Kamran Asadi	Reza Maghsoudi	IRIB TV3	
2020	Soldier	Faramarz Falaki	Hadi Moghaddamdoost	IRIB TV3	

== Theatre ==
=== As an actor ===
- Glass Garden and Zoo - 2006
- Mir Nowruz - 2009
- Battle and Medea - 2010
- Labirent - 2013
- A Skull in Connemara - 2013
- Dragon rage - 2015
- Wrong arrangement - 2016
- Dribble - 2017

=== As a director ===
- Ignorant Chef - 2005
- Prisoner No. 3 from the United States - 2007
- Garbage bin neighbor - 2008 and 2010
- Freedom in the Dead End - 2010
- Four seasons like each other - 2010
- Plus-Plus to the power of two - 2022
