= After the Incident =

- Film poster
- Directed by: Pouria Heidary Oureh
- Written by: Pouria Heidary Oureh
- Produced by: Shahab Hosseini; Arshad Khan; Peter Stephanou
- Starring: Javad Ezzati; Reza Kianian; Setareh Pesyani; Bahram Afshari; Ali Ansarian; Reza Naji; Sedigheh Kianfar; Gelareh Abassi; Nima Shabannejad; Yasna Mirtahmasb; Amirreza Ranjbaran
- Cinematography: Alireza Barazandeh
- Edited by: Sara Ahani
- Music by: Kamyar Behbahani
- Release date: 21 October 2020 (International Film Festival for Children and Youth)
- Running time: 75 minutes
- Country: Iran
- Language: Persian

After the Incident (Persian: بعد از اتفاق, romanized: Bad az Etefagh) is a 2020 Iranian drama film written and directed by Pouria Heidary Oureh. The film screened for the first time at the International Film Festival for Children and Youth.

== Plot ==
A child named Ruhollah who decided to cope with the situation after an unfortunate incident and try to achieve his goals...

== Reception ==
=== Awards and nominations ===
Year	Award	Category	Recipient	Result
2020	International Film Festival for Children and Youth	UNICEF Award (Best Film)	Pouria Heidary Oureh	Won
