= Gold and Copper =

2010 film

- Film poster
- Persian: طلا و مس
- Directed by: Homayoon Asadian
- Written by: Hamed Mohammadi
- Produced by: Manouchehr Mohammadi
- Starring: Negar Javaherian; Sahar Dolatshahi; Mehran Rajabi; Behrouz Shoeibi
- Cinematography: Hossein Jafarian
- Edited by: Bahram Dehghan
- Music by: Arya Aziminejad
- Release date: January 23, 2010 (Fajr International Film Festival)
- Running time: 97 minutes
- Country: Iran
- Language: Persian

Gold and Copper is a 2010 Iranian film directed by Homayoon Asadian that premiered at the 2010 Fajr International Film Festival.

== Plot ==
Seyed Reza is a young student came to Tehran to sit in the class of a famous theological teacher. After a while, his wife developed Multiple sclerosis and he got some trouble to pay.

== Awards ==
Negar Javaherian won the award for Best Actress at the Fajr International Film Festival.
