= Saturday's Hunter =

2010 film

- Persian: شکارچی شنبه
- Directed by: Parviz Sheikh Tadi
- Written by: Parviz Sheikh Tadi
- Starring: Ali Nassirian; Darine Hamze
- Edited by: Parviz Sheikh Tadi
- Release dates: February 2010 (Fajr Film Festival); 17 August 2012 (Iran)
- Running time: 90 minutes
- Countries: Iran; Lebanon
- Languages: Persian; Hebrew; Arabic

Saturday's Hunter (Persian: شکارچی شنبه) (also called Saturday Hunter or The Saturday's Hunter) is a 2010 film by the Iranian director Parviz Sheikh Tadi. The film was subsequently viewed as antisemitic, as it reportedly depicted Jews massacring Arabs while seeking god-like powers. The film was subsequently nominated in the 28th Fajr International Film Festival and was screened at the 17th international children's festival in Hamedan. The film was also broadcast on Channel 1 of Iranian TV on August 17, 2012.

The film was distributed by Iran’s Jebraeil Film Distributing Company, which announced that the film would be screened in Iranian universities and seminaries.

== Plot ==
The film's plot focuses on a boy and his grandfather, who execute Arab civilians in order to steal their land. The grandfather is later revealed to be the leader of a secretive Jewish organization who believe that massacring Arabs will help them achieve "God-like powers." The grandfather also claims that he is empowered to "absolve" anyone of their wrongdoings as long as they provide a sufficient "financial payment." The Grandfather explains that "This is the penalty for those who ridicule the laws of Moses. You have to pay these indulgences. In order to escape the law of God, you must pay this money. The God of the Jews is too lenient with you. If I were in His shoes, I would take your lives, not just your money." When the boy is taught how to shoot and is instructed to shoot at black silhouettes of Arab civilians, the Grandfather explains that "God will be pleased." In a later scene, a group of mercenaries controlled by the grandfather are shown shooting unarmed Arab civilians.

== Cast ==
The film stars Iranian actor Ali Nasirian as Hanan (the Grandfather) and Mohammad Javad Jafarpour as Benjamin. The film also stars Darine Hamze, Amir-Yal Arjomand, Mehdi Faqih and Mobina Karimi.

== Production and development ==
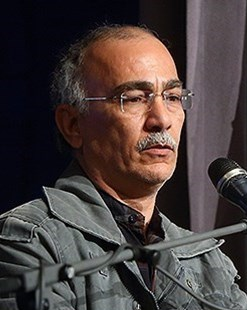
Director Sheikh Tadi speaking at a congress in February 2015.

In an interview with the Art News Agency, director Parviz Sheikh Tadi stated that the film was based on years of research in order to accurately depict "how children grow in Israel with training of Zionism." He also explained that:

"ethnic and religious racism has roots in Jew's nation and this kind of action is legal in their rules and they thought that they have the best religion in the world. And because this kind of issue is limited in other countries we in Iran should pay attention to it."

In an interview with the Tehran Times, Sheikh Tadi explained that Saturday's Hunter was "the first movie that reveals some novel aspects about Zionism, focusing on radical Zionism."

In an article published in Iran, Sheikh Tadi explained that "I extracted most of the information from the resources of the Zionist regime [Israel], such as books, films, photos and interviews with soldiers, leaders and various social strata of this regime. Zionists worked on beliefs of Jews for four generations and promulgated religious nationalism and Jewish Talibanism.” He also stated that:

We must come to terms with this reality that the Zionist lobby has a great deal of influence in the cinema industry and that the US and other western powers constantly support the interests of the Zionist regime worldwide.

== Response ==
In an interview with the Tehran Times, Mohsen Sadeqi, the managing director of Jebraeil Film Distributing Company (which distributed the film), stated that “The film is still being screened in eight theaters in Tehran and according to a poll conducted by the IRIB, over 40 percent of the film audience called the film excellent.” Sadeqi also defended the film, stating that "It is natural that the Zionists are angry about the film screening which make us more strong-willed. Unfortunately several officials and organizations do not agree to support the film although it is an important movie which makes Zionists angry.”

The film was also one of several screened at a film festival in Gaza in December 2012.
