= Milad Salehpour =

Television presenter

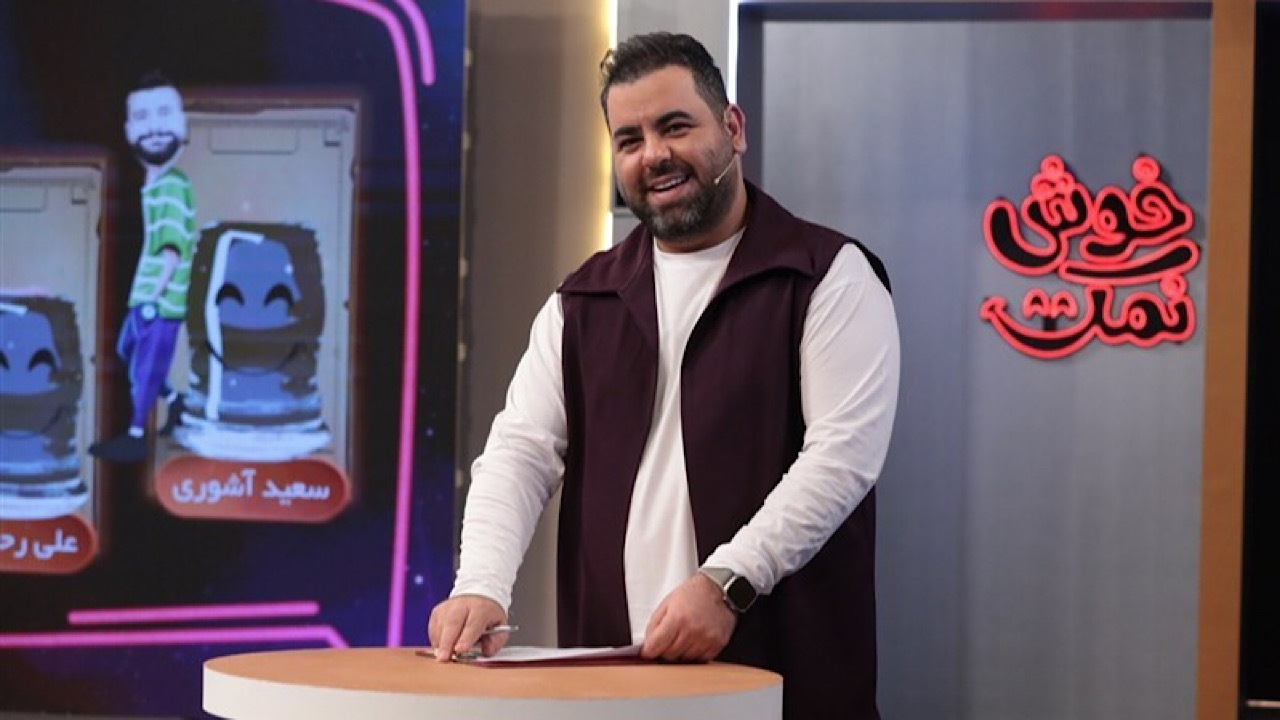
- Born: 3 January 1991 (age 35); Tehran, Iran
- Occupation: Television presenter
- Years active: 2022–present
- Website: Official Instagram Profile

Milad Salehpour (Persian: میلاد صالح پور; born 3 January 1991) is an Iranian Television presenter. He is the host of "Khosh Namak" which airs on Nasim network.
