= Felicity Land =

2011 film

- Film poster
- Directed by: Maziar Miri
- Written by: Amir Arabi
- Produced by: Homayoun Assadian
- Starring: Hamed Behdad; Leila Hatami; Mahnaz Afshar; Hossein Yari
- Cinematography: Mohammad Aladpoush
- Music by: Christophe Rezai
- Release date: 1 October 2011
- Running time: 90 minutes
- Country: Iran
- Language: Persian

Felicity Land (Persian: سعادت آباد Saadat Abad) is a 2011 Iranian drama film directed by Maziar Miri.

== Cast ==
- Hamed Behdad as Mohsen
- Leila Hatami as Yasi
- Mahnaz Afshar as Laleh
- Hossein Yari as Bahram
- Amir Aghaei as Ali
- Hengameh Ghaziani as Tahmine
- Mina Sadati as Mina
