= Beirut Hotel =

- Poster used in Locarno Film Festival
- Directed by: Danielle Arbid
- Written by: Danielle Arbid; Percy Kemp; Vincent Dieutre
- Starring: Darine Hamze; Fadi Abi Samra; Charles Berling
- Cinematography: Pierric Gantelmi d'Ille
- Release date: 4 August 2011 (Film Festival Locarno)
- Running time: 99 minutes
- Country: Lebanon
- Languages: Arabic; French; English

Beirut Hotel (Arabic: بيروت بالليل, romanized: Beirut bel layl, French: Beyrouth Hôtel) is a 2011 Lebanese film directed by Danielle Arbid. The film premiered at the 2011 Locarno International Film Festival.

== Plot ==
One evening, a married young singer Zoha meets the French lawyer Mathieu in a night club in Beirut. Mathieu will become suspected of spying, while Zoha is trying to flee from her husband. Despite these problems, the two will witness a love story for few days mixed with violence and fear.

== Cast ==
- Darine Hamze as Zoha
- Rodney El Haddad as Hicham
- Charles Berling as Mathieu
- Karl Sarafidis as Rabih
- Fadi Abi Samra as Abbas
- Hussein Mokadem as Le cousin d'Abbas
- Karim Saleh as Tony
- Joseph Saklameh as Agent de l'oncle

== Controversy ==
The movie was banned from viewing in Lebanon due to mentioning the Hariri assassination in the plot. The movie sparked controversy due to its explicit sexual scenes and partial nudity. Some Arab families reportedly walked out of the screening during its participation in the 2011 Namur International Francophone Film Festival in Belgium in protest against these scenes. Director Danielle Arbid defended their inclusion, stating that they served the film's dramatic context.
