= Hinepukohurangi: Shrouded in the Mist =

Studio album by Whirimako Black
- Released: 2000
- Genre: World music
- Producer: Wiremu Aata Te Rangiamua Karaitiana

Whirimako Black chronology
Hinepukohurangi: Shrouded in the Mist (2000)	Hohou Te Rongo: Cultivate Peace (2003)

Hinepukohurangi: Shrouded in the Mist is Whirimako Black's first album. It won Best Maori Language Album at the 2001 NZ Music Awards.

== Track listing ==
1. "Engari Te Titi"
2. "Te Tini O Toi"
3. "E Kui Kumara"
4. "Moumou"
5. "E Kui Mareta"
6. "Torete Te Kiore"
7. "Kua Tata"
8. "Mihi Ki Te Wao-nui"
9. "Taku Rakau E"
10. "He Taonga"
11. "Hinekoti"
12. "He Koha Kii Na Taku Kui"
