= Vincent Dieutre =

French film director and screenwriter (1960–2026)

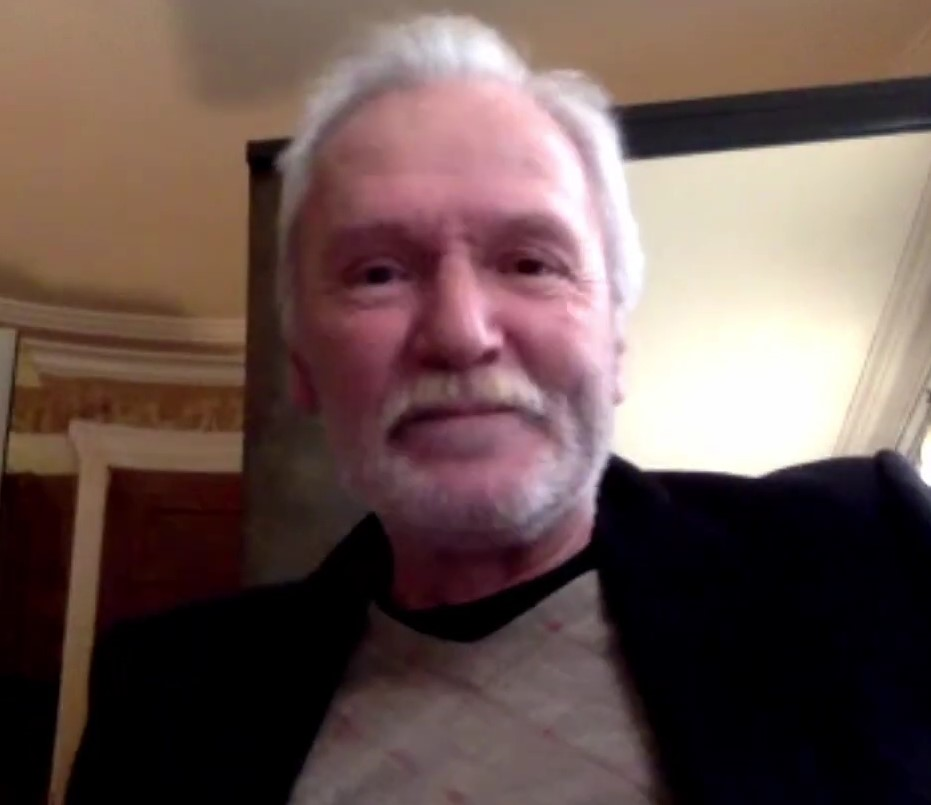

Vincent Dieutre (25 November 1960 – 10 August 2026) was a French film director and screenwriter. His films are primarily in the genre of docudrama, blending aspects of both documentary film and fiction.

Dieutre was born in Le Petit-Quevilly on 25 November 1960. He was openly gay. He died on 10 August 2026, at the age of 65.

== Films ==
- Rome désolée (1995)
- Leçons de ténèbres (2000). Jury prize at the Marseille Festival of Documentary Film.
- Entering Difference (Lettre de Chicago) (2000)
- Bonne Nouvelle (2001). Jury prize at the Locarno International Film Festival.
- Mon voyage d'hiver (2003)
- Bologna Centrale (2003)
- Les accords d'Alba (2004)
- Fragments sur la grâce (2006)
- Une larme d'amour (2007)
- Conversations avec Yaël André (2008)
- ea2, 2e exercice d'admiration : Jean Eustache (2010)
- Beirut Hotel (2011)
- Jaurès (2012)
- This is the End (2023)
