= IRIB UHD =

Iranian Television channel

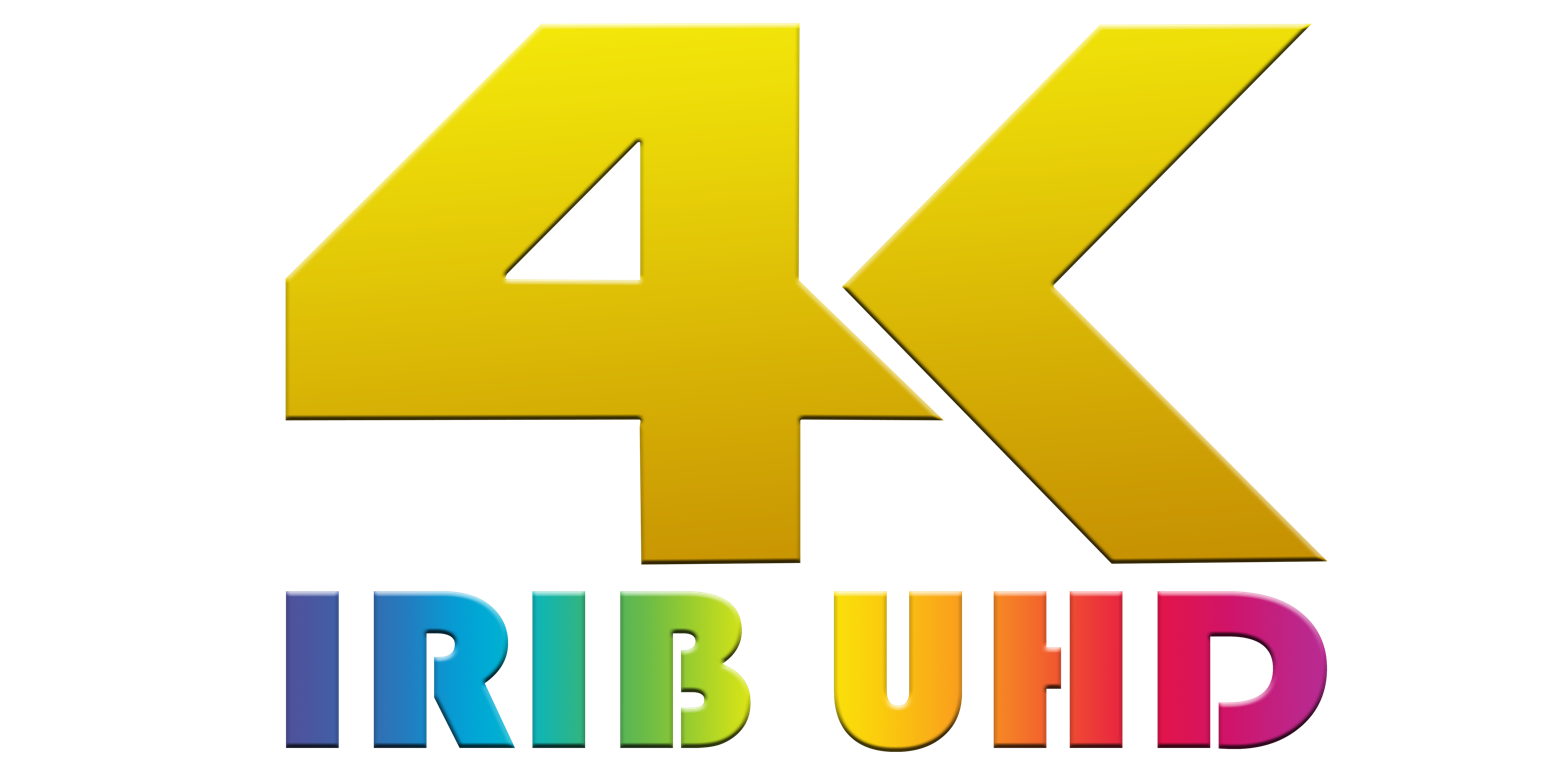
- Country: Iran
- Broadcast area: Asia

Programming
- Language: Persian
- Picture format: 16:9 (2160p, UHD)

Ownership
- Owner: IRIB
- Sister channels: IRIB Nasim

History
- Launched: 29 November 2020

Links
- Website: iribuhd.ir

Availability

Terrestrial
- Jamaran: CH54 UHF Digital (4K)

Streaming media
- Telewebion: live streaming
- Sepehr: live streaming

IRIB UHD is one of the state-owned television channels in Iran, managed by the Islamic Republic of Iran Broadcasting Organization. This channel is the first Persian-language television channel with 4K resolution, which began operating in November 2020. This channel is managed by Abolfazl Salehi.
