= Asia Pacific Screen Award for Best Performance by an Actress =

The Asia Pacific Screen Award for Performance by an Actress is a former category in the Asia Pacific Screen Awards, between 2007 and 2021. It was retired after that, along with the Asia Pacific Screen Award for Best Performance by an Actor, both being collapsed into Asia Pacific Screen Award for Best Performance from 2022.

== Winners and nominees ==
=== 2000s ===
| Year | Winner and nominees | English title | Original title |
|---|---|---|---|
| 2007 | (South Korea) Jeon Do-yeon | Secret Sunshine | 밀양, Miryang |
| 2007 | (China) (United States) Joan Chen | The Home Song Stories | |
| 2007 | (Egypt) Hanan Tork | Cut and Paste | Ass Wa Lazq |
| 2007 | (Lebanon) Nadine Labaki, Yasmine Al Masri, Joanna Moukarzel, Gisele Aouad, Asiza Semaan and Siham Haddad | Caramel | سكر بنات |
| 2007 | (Iran) Baran Kosari | Mainline | Khoon bazi |
| 2008 | (Israel) Hiam Abbass | Lemon Tree | עץ לימון, Etz Limon |
| 2008 | (Russia) Nesipkul Omarbekova | Native Dancers | Baksy |
| 2008 | (China) Miao Pu | Cherries | Ying Tao |
| 2008 | (Russia) Daria Moroz | Live and Remember | Zhivi I Phomni] |
| 2008 | (Japan) Akie Namiki | United red Army | 実録・連合赤軍 あさま山荘への道程 Jitsuroku Rengōsekigun Asama-Sansō e no Dōtei |
| 2009 | (Korea) Kim Hye-ja | Mother | 마더, Madeo |
| 2009 | (China) Zhou Xun | The Equation of Love and Death | 李米的猜想 |
| 2009 | (Russia) Yana Troyanova | Wolfy | VOLCHOK |
| 2009 | (Sri Lanka) Malani Fonseka | Flowers of the Sky | Akasa Kusum |
| 2009 | (Iran) Golshifteh Farahani | About Elly | درباره الی, Darbâreye Eli |

=== 2010s ===
| Year | Winner and nominees | English title | Original title |
|---|---|---|---|
| 2010 | (South Korea) Yoon Jeong-hee | Poetry | Si |
| 2010 | (China) Yu Nan | Weaving Girl | Fang Zhi Gu Niang |
| 2010 | (China) Xu Fan | Aftershock | 唐山大地震 |
| 2010 | (India) Tejaswini Pandit, | I Am Sindhutai Sapkal | मी सिंधुताई सपकाळ, Mee Sindhutai Sapkal |
| 2010 | (Korea) Seo Woo | Paju | 파주 |
| 2011 | (Russia) Nadezhda Markina | Elena | Елена |
| 2011 | (Iran) Leila Zare | Goodbye | به امید دیدار,, Be omid e didar |
| 2011 | (Egypt) Nahed El Sebai | Cairo 678 | |
| 2011 | (Iran) Shayesteh Irani | Facing Mirrors | Aynehaye Rooberoo |
| 2011 | (Australia) Judy Davis | The Eye of the Storm | |
| 2012 | (Philippines) Nora Aunor | Thy Womb | Sinapupunan |
| 2012 | (Pakistan) Humaima Malick | Bol | بول, |
| 2012 | (Russia) Darya Ekamasova | Once Upon a Time There Lived a Simple Woman | Жила-была одна баба; Zhila-byla odna baba |
| 2012 | (Korea) Jo Min-su | Pieta | 피에타 |
| 2012 | (India) Vidya Balan | The Dirty Picture | |
| 2013 | (China) Zhang Ziyi | The Grandmaster | Yi dai zong shi |
| 2013 | (Turkey) Ayça Damgaci | Yozgat Blues - | |
| 2013 | (Iran) Golshifteh Farahani | My Sweet Pepper Land | |
| 2013 | (New Zealand) Whirimako Black | White Lies | |
| 2013 | (Iran) Negar Javaherian | Painting Pool | حوض نقاشی, Hoze Naghashi |
| 2014 | (China) Lü Zhong | Red Amnesia | 闖入者, Chuǎngrù zhě |
| 2014 | (Philippines) Nora Aunor | Justice | Hustisya |
| 2014 | (Israel) Ronit Elkabetz | Gett: The Trial of Viviane Amsalem | גט - המשפט של ויויאן אמסאלם |
| 2014 | (China) Tang Wei | The Golden Era | 黄金时代 |
| 2014 | (Iran) Merila Zarei | Track 143 | |
| 2015 | (Japan) Kirin Kiki | Sweet Bean | あん, An |
| 2015 | (Iran) Fatemeh Motamed-Arya | Bahman | بهمن, |
| 2015 | (Philippines) Sharmaine Buencamino | Lorna | |
| 2015 | (Russia) Evgeniya Mandzhieva | The Gulls | Чайки, Chaiki |
| 2015 | (Korea) Lee Yeong-lan | End of winter | 철원기행 (cheol-won-gi-haeng) |
| 2016 | (Philippines) Hasmine Kilip | Ordinary People | Pamilya Ordinaryo |
| 2016 | (Korea) Youn Yuh-jung | The Bacchus Lady | 죽여주는 여자 |
| 2016 | (Russia) Agripina Steklova | Insight | |
| 2016 | (Russia) Natalia Pavlenko | Zoologiy | Zoologiya |
| 2016 | (Turkey) Aslıhan Gürbüz | Ember | Zor |
| 2017 | (Georgia (country)) Nata Murvanidze | Scary Mother | Sashishi Deda |
| 2017 | (Indonesia) Cut Mini | Emma' (Mother) | Athirah |
| 2017 | (Turkey) Ecem Uzun | Clair Obscur | Tereddüt |
| 2017 | (South Korea) Na Moon-hee | I Can Speak | |
| 2017 | (China) Zhou Xun | Our Time Will Come | 明月幾時有 |
| 2018 | (China) Zhao Tao | Ash is Purest White | 江湖儿女 |
| 2018 | (Kazakhstan) Samal Yeslyamova | Ayka | Айка |
| 2018 | (United States) Rooney Mara | Mary Magdalene | |
| 2018 | (Turkey) Damla Sönmez | Sibel | |
| 2018 | (Kazakhstan) Laura Koroleva | Sveta | |
| 2019 | (Philippines) Max Eigenmann | Verdict | |
| 2019 | (Russia) Viktoria Miroshnichenko | Beanpole | Дылда |
| 2019 | (Kazakhstan) Samal Yeslyamova | The Horse Thieves. Roads of Time | |
| 2019 | (South Korea) Park Ji-hu | House of Hummingbird | 벌새 |
| 2019 | (China) Yong Mei | So Long, My Son | 地久天长 |

=== 2020s ===
| Year | Winner and nominees | English title | Original title |
|---|---|---|---|
| 2021 | (Bangladesh) Azmeri Haque Badhon | Rehana Maryam Noor | রেহানা মরিয়ম নূর |
| 2021 | (Israel) Alena Yiv | Asia | |
| 2021 | (Australia) Essie Davis | The Justice of Bunny King | |
| 2021 | (Australia) Leah Purcell | The Drover's Wife: The Legend of Molly Johnson | |
| 2021 | (Russia) Valentina Romanova-Chyskyyray | Scarecrow | Пугало |

== See also ==
- Asian Film Award for Best Actress
