= The Book of Law (film) =

- The poster on Maziar Miri's official website
- Directed by: Maziar Miri
- Written by: Mohammad Rahmanian
- Produced by: Mohsen AliAkbari
- Starring: Parviz Parastui; Darine Hamze; Davood FathaliBeigi; Fariba Jeddikar; Negar Javaherian; Farideh Sepahmansour
- Cinematography: Shapoor Pooramin
- Edited by: Mohammad Reza Mouyini
- Music by: Mohammad Reza Aligholi
- Release date: March 25, 2009 (Hong Kong International Film Festival)
- Country: Iran
- Language: Persian French

The Book of Law (French: Livre de loi; Persian: کتاب قانون, transliteration: Ketabe ghanoun) is a 2009 Drama, Comedy, Romance Iranian film directed by Maziar Miri, written by Mohammad Rahmanian, and produced by Mohsen AliAkbari. The film is about a Lebanese woman and convert to Islam struggling with the contrast between the behaviour of Iranian Muslims and the principles of Islamic religion. The film stars Parviz Parastui and Darine Hamze.

== Plot ==
Engineer Rahman Tavana, a government employee, falls in love with a Christian girl, Juliet Khamse, while working in an international mission. She converts to Islam, changes her name to Ameneh, and moves to Iran with Rahman. Once in Iran she finds that she cannot accept what she sees as contradictions between the actions of Iranian Muslims, including her husband and his family, and the teachings of the Qu'ran, and eventually decides to return to the Lebanon, where she takes a job as a teacher for refugees.

== Cast ==
- Parviz Parastui as Rahman
- Darine Hamze as Ameneh
- Negar Javaherian as Kokab
- Davood Fathali Beigi as chief
- Farideh Sepah Mansour as Rahman's mother
- Roshanak Ajamian
- Fariba Jeddikar
- Behnaz Tavakoli
- Mehrdad Ziai
- Naiyereh Farahani
- Ahmad Mohebbi Sangari
- Vishka Asayesh as Maternity doctor

== International export ==
The film failed to be granted an Export Licence by the Iranian Ministry of Culture because of fears that the film might be misinterpreted by Western audiences, and Western media would portray the film as an accurate depiction of Iranian life rather than a comedy.

== Awards ==
=== Celebration House of Cinema ===
Category	Nominee(s)	Result	Award
Best Actor in a Leading Role	Parviz Parastui	Nominated	House of Cinema Statue
Best Actress in a Leading Role	Darine Hamze	Nominated	House of Cinema Statue
Best Actor in second Role	Davood Fathalibeigi	Nominated	House of Cinema Statue
Best Actress in a second Role	Faried Sepah Mansour	Nominated	House of Cinema Statue
Best Actress in a second Role	Negar Javaherian	Nominated	House of Cinema Statue
Best composer	Mohammadreza Aligholi	Nominated	House of Cinema Statue
Best editor	Mohammadreza Mouyini	Nominated	House of Cinema Statue

=== Tokyo International Film Festival ===
Despite not being granted an export permit, "The Book of Law" was screened at the Hong Kong International Film Festival in March 2009 and was nominated for Best Asian-Middle Eastern Film Award at the Tokyo International Film Festival in October 2009.
