= Here Without Me =

Here Without Me اینجا بدون من
- Theatrical release poster
- Directed by: Bahram Tavakoli
- Screenplay by: Bahram Tavakoli
- Based on: The Glass Menagerie by Tennessee Williams
- Produced by: Saeed Sadi
- Starring: Fatemeh Motamed-Aria; Saber Abar; Negar Javaherian; Parsa Pirouzfar
- Cinematography: Hamid Khozouie Abyaneh
- Edited by: Bahram Dehghan
- Music by: Hamed Sabet
- Release date: October 3, 2011 (Hamburg Film Festival)
- Running time: 90 minutes
- Country: Iran
- Language: Persian

Here Without Me (Persian: اینجا بدون من) is an Iranian drama film written and directed by Bahram Tavakoli and produced by Saeed Sadi, produced in 2010 and screened in 2011. The film stars Fatemeh Motamed-Aria, Saber Abar, Negar Javaherian and Parsa Pirouzfar. The story is about a family of three dreaming about their wishes, and was inspired by the play The Glass Menagerie, written by Tennessee Williams. Fatemeh Motamed-Arya won the best actress award in the 35th Montreal World Film Festival for this film.

== Plot ==
Based on The Glass Menagerie, the movie details the story of Yalda (Negar Javaherian), a disabled girl who has a great interest for collecting glass animals. She harbors a secret attraction towards her brother Ehsan's best friend Reza (Parsa Pirouzfar). Her brother Ehsan (Saber Abar), whose voiceover introduces the film, writes poetry and desperately dreams of leaving Iran. He dreams of being a writer and spends his spare time haunting cinemas and watching old movies over and over. Farideh (Fatemeh Motamed-Aria) holds down two jobs to help support her family. Farideh is trying her best to find a prompt suitor for her introvert daughter Yalda.

== Cast ==
- Fatemeh Motamed-Aria as Farideh
- Saber Abar as Ehsan
- Negar Javaherian as Yalda
- Parsa Pirouzfar as Reza

== Release ==
Screened and welcomed by critics and audience in 11th Tiburon Film Festival 35th Montréal Film Festival, 2011 2nd Iranian Film Festival Australia, 2012 36th Cleveland International Film Festival, 2012

== Reception ==
=== Awards ===
Year	Award	Category	Recipient	Result
2011	36th Montréal Film Festival	Best Actress prize	Fatemeh Motamed-Arya	Won
