= Halal Love =

2015 film

- Halal Love (and Sex)
- Directed by: Assad Fouladkar
- Written by: Assad Fouladkar
- Produced by: Gerhard Meixner; Roman Paul; Sadek Sabbah
- Cinematography: Lutz Reitemeier
- Music by: Amin Bouhafa
- Production companies: Razor Film Produktion; Sabbah Media Corporation
- Release dates: December 13, 2015 (Dubai International Film Festival); January 23, 2016 (Sundance Film Festival)
- Running time: 95 minutes
- Language: Arabic

Love Halal, also called (Halal Love (and Sex)), is an international film from 2015, written and directed by Assad Fouladkar. The film premiered on December 13, 2015, at the Dubai International Film Festival and had its international premiere at the Sundance Film Festival in 2016 in the World Cinema Dramatic Competition.

== Plot ==
The film tells four stories that are intertwined, tragic and sometimes comical. Some Muslims, both men and women, trying to satisfy their desires and love life without breaking their religious rules. The newlyweds Batoul and Mokhtar bicker constantly and threatens a divorce by the possessive jealousy Mokhtar. The neighbours depleted Awatah trying to find a second wife in order to meet the constant demands of her husband Salim. Their precocious daughters come with their own wild theory about the birds and the bees. Loubna meanwhile, is hoping a divorcee and emerging fashion designer, a second chance with her first love, the grocer Abu Ahmad, through a scandalous secret regarding marriage.

== Reception ==
Reception was positive.

== Cast ==
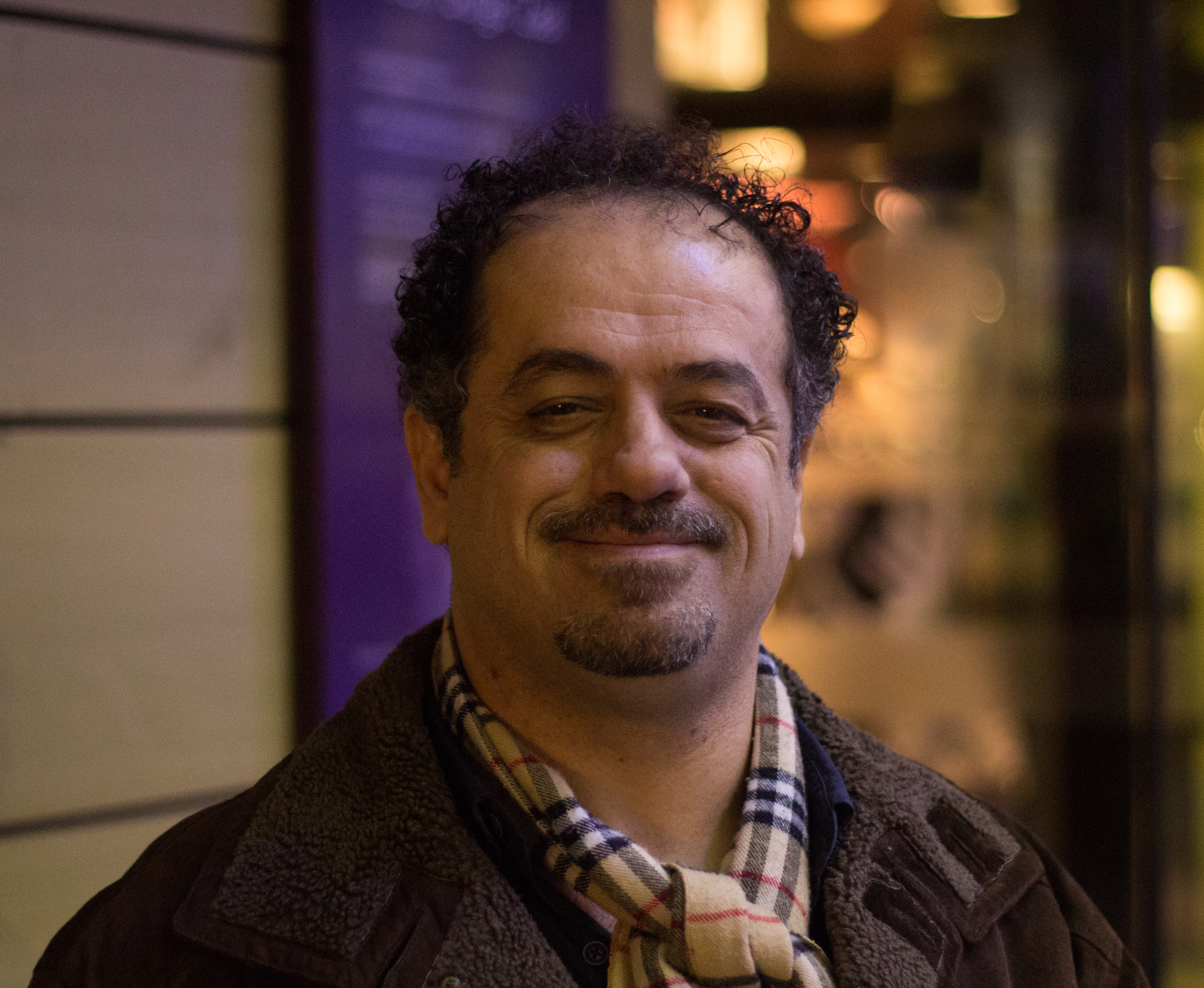
Ali Sammoury at the International Film Festival Rotterdam, where he was to promote "Halal Love"

- Darine Hamze as Loubna
- Rodrigue Sleiman as Abou Ahmad
- Zeinab Khadra as Batoul
- Hussein Mokadem as Mokhtar
- Mirna Moukarzel as Awatef
- Ali Sammoury as Salim
