= My Father's Rifle =

2004 novella by Hiner Saleem

- Author: Hiner Saleem
- Original title: Le Fusil de mon père
- Translator: Catherine Temerson (English)
- Published: 2004 (Éditions du Seuil) (French); 2005 (Farrar, Straus and Giroux) (English)
- Publication date: 2004
- Publication place: France
- English publication date: 2005
- ISBN: 978-0-374-21693-1

My Father's Rifle: A Childhood in Kurdistan (French: Le Fusil de mon père) is a novella by Kurdish screenplay writer, writer, and film director Hiner Saleem, whose name is also transliterated as Huner Saleem and Huner Salim. Originally published in 2004 in France by Éditions du Seuil, the novella was published in English the following year by the American publishing company Farrar, Straus and Giroux. It was translated to English by Catherine Temerson.

The novella is a fictionalized account of Saleem's childhood in Iraqi Kurdistan during the 1960s and 1970s, presented as a first-person narrative by the protagonist Azad Shero Selim. It captures the experience of war and conflict from the perspective of a child from Akre, coming of age amidst the Kurdish struggle for independence led by Mustafa Barzani.
