= Vodka Lemon =

2003 film

- Theatrical Poster
- Directed by: Hiner Saleem
- Written by: Lei Dinety; Pauline Gouzenne; Hiner Saleem
- Produced by: Fabrice Guez
- Starring: Romen Avinian; Lala Sarkissian
- Edited by: Dora Mantzorou
- Distributed by: New Yorker Films
- Release date: 2003
- Running time: 84 minutes
- Countries: France; Italy; Switzerland; Armenia
- Languages: Armenian; Kurdish; Russian; French
- Budget: $2,0 M

Vodka Lemon (Kurdish: Vodka Lîmon, Armenian: Վոդկա լիմոն, Russian: Водка Лимон) is a 2003 internationally co-produced comedy-drama film directed and co-written by the Iraqi–Kurdish director Huner Saleem.

== Plot ==
The film is set in a Yazidi village in Armenia, still suffering economically from the Soviet Union's collapse. Hamo, a widower with three sons, visits his wife's grave every day. In the graveyard, he meets Nina, a widow who works at a local roadside stand called Vodka Lemon which is about to close down. Both are penniless, yet start an unexpected relationship which revitalises them.

== Awards ==
- San Marco Prize, Best Film Award, 60th Venice International Film Festival, 2003.
- Jury Award, Feature Film/Best Actor, Newport Beach Film Festival, 2004.
- Grand Prize, Jury Prize and Best Photography, Mons International Festival of Love Films, 2004.
- Best Film 2003 nominee – Bangkok Film Festival, 2004

== Cast ==
- Romen Avinian
- Lala Sarkissian
- Gagik Sargsyan
- Ruzan Mesropyan
- Zahal Karielachvili
- Armen Marutyan
- Astrik Avaguian
- Ivan Franěk

== Soundtrack ==
- Tombe la neige by Salvatore Adamo
- Письмо (Pismo / Letter) by Klavdiya Shulzhenko
