= Negar (film) =

- Persian: نگار
- Directed by: Rambod Javan
- Written by: Ehsan Goudarzi
- Produced by: Rambod Javan
- Starring: Negar Javaherian; Mohammad-Reza Foroutan; Atila Pesyani; Afsaneh Bayegan; Parsa Arqami
- Edited by: Bahram Dehghan
- Music by: Christophe Rezai
- Release date: 6 January 2017
- Running time: 100 minutes
- Country: Iran
- Language: Persian
- Box office: $312,000

Negar (Persian: نگار) is an Iranian movie directed by Rambod Javan. Story of the movie is written by Ehsan Goudarzi.

In 35th Fajr International Film Festival, Negar has been nominated for crystal Simorgh in 9 majors.

== Awards ==
major	nominate	result	award
Best director	Rambod Javan	Nominated	Crystal Simorgh
Best Costume Design	Negar Nemati	Nominated	Crystal Simorgh
Best editor	Bahram Dehghan	Nominated	Crystal Simorgh
Best voice record	Vahid Qodsi	Nominated	Crystal Simorgh
Best music	Christophe Rezai	Won	Crystal Simorgh
Best Screenplay	Bahram badakhshani	Nominated	Crystal Simorgh
Best Sound Mixing	Hossein Abolsedgh	Nominated	Crystal Simorgh
Best picture	Maryam Takhtkishan	Nominated	Crystal Simorgh
Best Set Design	Amirhossein Qodsi	Nominated	Crystal Simorgh

== Cast ==
- Negar Javaherian
- Mohammad-Reza Foroutan
- Mani Haghighi
- Atila Pesyani
- Afsaneh Bayegan
- Ashkan Khatibi
- Parsa Arghami

== See also ==
- Setareh Pesyani
