= International Film Festival for Children and Youth =

Iranian annual film festival

The International Film Festival for Children and Youth is an annual Iranian film festival targeting children and youth.

== Awards ==
The highest award bestowed at the festival is called the Golden Butterfly.

== Host cities ==
Different cities have hosted the event, including Tehran, Hamedan, Kerman, and most recently, Isfahan.
