= My Sweet Pepper Land =

2013 film

- Theatrical poster
- Directed by: Huner Saleem
- Written by: Antoine Lacomblez; Huner Saleem; Véronique Wüthrich
- Produced by: Marc Bordure; Robert Guédiguian
- Starring: Golshifteh Farahani; Korkmaz Arslan
- Cinematography: Pascal Auffray
- Edited by: Clémence Samson; Sophie Reine; Juliette Haubois
- Distributed by: Memento Films (France)
- Release dates: 22 May 2013 (Cannes); 19 March 2014 (France); 27 March 2014 (Germany)
- Running time: 95 minutes
- Countries: France; Germany; Iraq
- Language: Kurdish

My Sweet Pepper Land is a 2013 Kurdish-language internationally co-produced drama film directed and co-written by Huner Saleem and Véronique Wüthrich. It was screened in the Un Certain Regard section at the 2013 Cannes Film Festival. It was nominated in the 7th annual Asia Pacific Screen Awards for Achievement in Directing for Huner Saleem and Best Performance by an Actress for Golshifteh Farahani.

== Plot ==
In a remote village in Iraqi Kurdistan lives the Kurdish patriot Baran who since recently serves as a policeman. He cannot help but provoke the local villain Aziz Aga and finds himself supported by an attractive lady named Govend who works as a teacher.

== Cast ==
- Korkmaz Arslan as Baran (as Korkmaz Arslan)
- Golshifteh Farahani as Govend
- Suat Usta as Reber
- Mir Murad Bedirxan as Tajdin
- Feyyaz Duman as Jaffar Mohammed Emin
- Tarik Akreyî as Aziz Ağa
