= Huner Saleem =

Iraqi–Kurdish film director

- هونه‌ر سەلیم
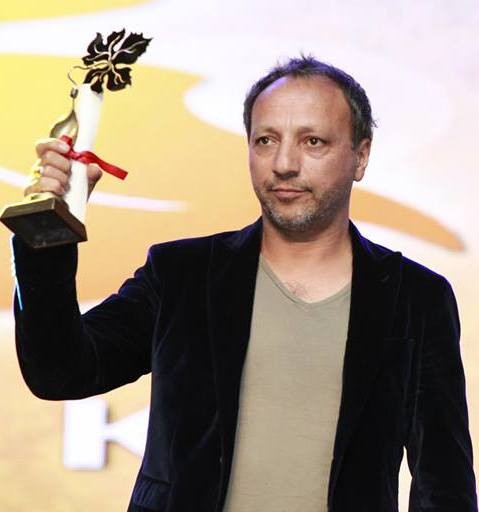
- Huner Saleem
- Born: March 9, 1964 (age 62); Akre, Kurdistan
- Occupations: Film director, Screenwriter
- Years active: 1997–present
- Known for: Vodka Lemon, My Sweet Pepper Land
- Notable work: Vodka Lemon, My Sweet Pepper Land
- Awards: San Marco Prize (2003), Chevalier des Arts et Lettres (2005)

Huner Saleem (Kurdish: هونه‌ر سەلیم), also transliterated as Huner Salim, (born 9 March 1964), is an Kurdish film director. He was born in the town of Akrê in Kurdistan. He left Iraq at the age of 17, and soon made his way to Italy, where he completed school and attended university. Later on, he moved to France where he lives now. In 1992, after the First Gulf War, he filmed undercover the living conditions of Kurds. This footage was shown at the Venice Film Festival. In 1998, he made his first movie, Vive la mariée... et la libération du Kurdistan. His second, Passeurs de rêves, came out in 2000, and his third film, Vodka Lemon, released in 2003, won the San Marco Prize at the Venice Film Festival . He wrote and directed all three. He was honored with the prestigious title Chevalier des Arts et Lettres by French Minister of Culture Renaud Donnedieu de Vabres in 2005. His memoirs titled My Father's Rifle has been published in French, English, Greek and Tamil.

His 2013 film My Sweet Pepper Land was screened in the Un Certain Regard section at the 2013 Cannes Film Festival. He was nominated for the Asia Pacific Screen Award for Achievement in Directing for this film.

== Filmography as director, writer ==
1. Vive la mariée... et la libération du Kurdistan (1997)
2. Passeurs de rêves (2000) (English Title: Beyond Our Dreams)
3. Absolitude (2001) (TV)
4. Vodka Lemon (2003)
5. Kilomètre zéro (2005)
6. Dol (2007)
7. Les Toits de Paris (2007) (English Title: Beneath the Rooftops of Paris)
8. Si tu meurs, je te tue (2011)
9. My Sweet Pepper Land (2013)
10. "Tight Dress" (2015)
11. Lady Winsley (2019)

== Books ==
1. My Father's Rifle: A Childhood in Kurdistan, Translated from French by Catherine Temerson, 112 pp., Farrar, Straus and Giroux. January 2005, ISBN 0-374-21693-2.
2. To doufeki tou patera mou Translated from French by Efi Koromila, 181 pp., Okeanida, Athens, February 2004, ISBN 960-410-324-5.
