= Tehran International Puppet Theatre Festival =

Puppet festival in Iran

Tehran International Puppet Theatre Festival (est.1989) or Mobarak International Puppet Theater Festival occurs in Tehran, Iran, about every two years. It features puppetry acts from around the world. Event organizers include Rahmatollah Mehrabi and Ardeshir Salehpour.

Among the participants:

- Dolls Theatre, Kolkata, India
- Yase-e-Tamam, Tehran
- State Puppet Theatre Varna, Bulgaria
- Puppetmongers, Canada
- Marionettentheater Schloss Schönbrunn, Vienna, Austria
- Magisch Theatertje, Netherlands
- Belarusian Theatre Lialka, Belarus
- Strangeface Theatre Co., Kent, England
- Strings Attached Puppet Theatre, Germany
- Cengiz Özek Shadow Theater, Turkey
- State Hand Shadow Theater, Georgia
- Poppentheater De Trekwagen, Netherlands
