= Maziar Miri =

Iranian filmmaker (born 1974)

- مازیار میری
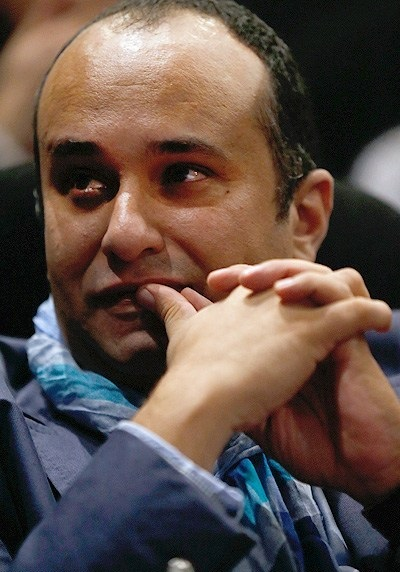
- Maziar Miri, 18 August 2013
- Born: February 1, 1974 (age 52); Tehran, Iran
- Occupations: Director, Filmmaker

Maziar Miri (born 1974 in Tehran) is an Iranian filmmaker.

Maziar Miri graduated in editing, and started his career with making documentaries about Iran. He made his first short film in 1996, and worked for several years in the editing department of Iranian TV, channel 2. He made his debut feature film in 2000 titled The Unfinished Piece that won him several international awards but the movie was never allowed to release in Iran because of its topic about women being banned from singing in Iran. He directed a documentary series titled Red Migration that lasted from 2002 to 2004.

His second feature film, Gradually, was selected to be screened in 2006-Berlin film festival for the programme section. Reward of Silence is his third film with a different anti-war view at Iran -Iraq war. The Book of Law is the fourth film made by Miri on the topic of wrong customs and conventions in Iranian culture which was banned immediately for 2 years and was allowed neither to attend international festivals nor even national ones. It was finally unbanned after 2 years removing 9 minutes of it.

In 2010 he made his fifth film, Felicity Land. The film has criticized Iran's middle class. His latest film, The Painting Pool, is about an intellectually disabled couple and their problems in the society of Iran.

== Filmography ==
=== Film ===
- Sara and Aida (2016)
- The Painting Pool (2012)
- Felicity Land (2011)
- The Book of Law (2008)
- Reward of Silence (2006)
- Gradually (2005)
- The Unfinished Song (2000)

=== Home Video ===
Year	Title	Notes	Ref.
2021	Lunar Eclipse	distributed by Namava	

== Honors and awards ==
- Regard d’Or (Grand Prize of the Festival), Fribourg International Film Festival, Switzerland (2006).
- International Critics Prize (FIPRESCI) at Dhaka Film Festival.
- Best Directing Honorary Diploma at the Fajr Film Festival in International category.
- Best Film Award at Fajr Film Festival in the International Section for Gradually.

== See also ==
- Persian cinema
