= Darine Hamze =

Lebanese actress

Darine Hamze دارين حمزة
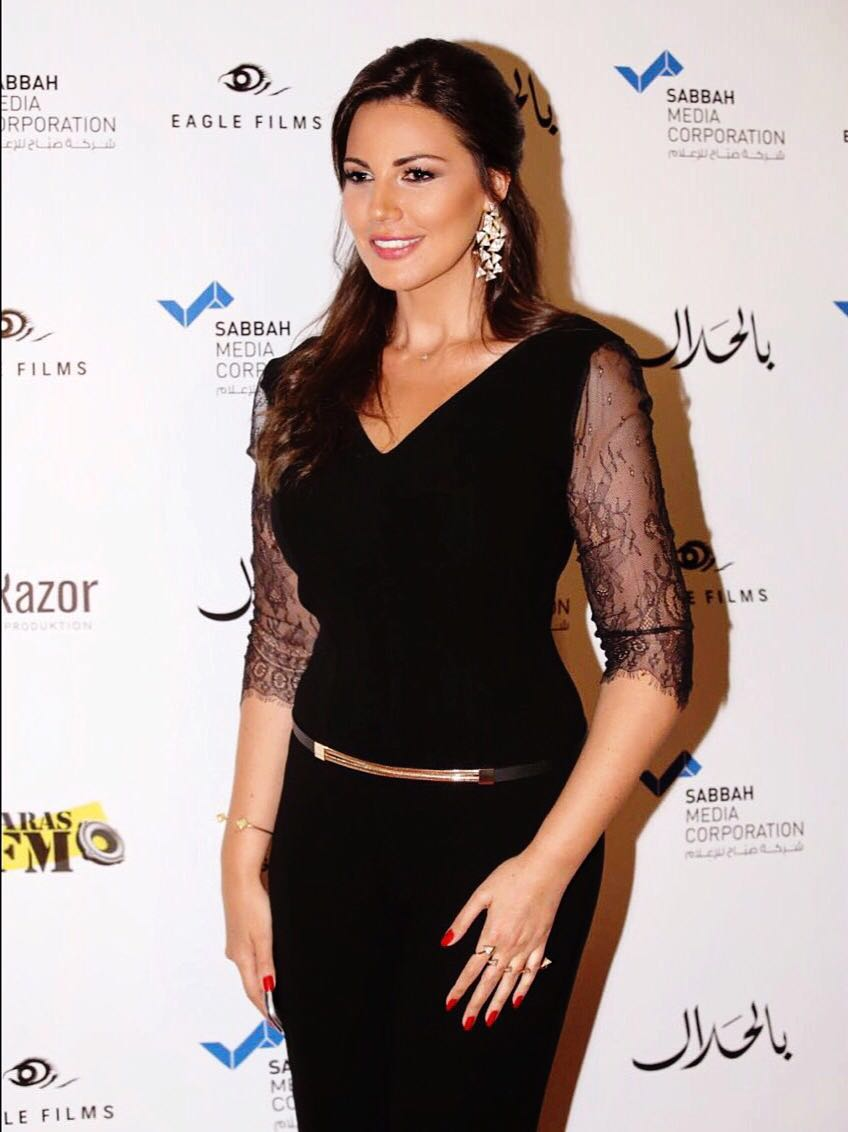
- Born: Baalbek, Lebanon
- Occupation: Actress

Darine Hamze (Arabic: دارين حمزة) (born on 5 July 1979) is a Lebanese actress, director and producer. She has been working in film, television and theatre since 2001 in The Middle East and Europe. Hamze won the Best Actress Award in Oran International Film Festival 2017 for her role in film Nuts.

== Biography ==
Darine Hamze was born on 5 July 1979. She was born as a second child. Her father was a flight engineer and her mother a painter, in Baalbek. She was raised in Souk El Gharb, Aley District, Lebanon. She is a Shia Muslim. She was sent to the United Kingdom (England), between the ages of 8 and 13, to a British boarding school (ISC) in Bath, along with her two brothers.

During her time in England, Hamze discovered Shakespeare's theatre. Evidently, her first appearance on a stage was during this young age in Bath participating in all school plays.

In 1998, Hamze applied and was accepted to the Fine Arts Academy of the Lebanese University, Theatre Department. 2002 was the year of her graduation with a BA in Theatre Arts (acting/directing).

In 2002, Hamze travelled back to London that year to publish her poetry art book "7am Blink" on the web launched 111101 (London, UK) in collaboration with painter/illustrator Rafic Majzoub.

In 2002, Hamze travelled to New York City where she attended film making classes at Columbia University. There she acted in the short student film "The Park" directed by Nadine Khouri.

Her connection with England led her, in 2003, to apply to the British Council's MA scholarships. She was accepted and travelled to London, UK to attend University of Westminster. In 2004, she graduated from the University of Westminster with a Master of Arts (MA) in Arts and Media Practice.

In 2005, Hamze returned to Beirut with her MA from London and directly started giving courses in acting, editing and media arts in a number of International Universities, mainly Université Antonine - UA, American University of Science and Technology - AUST, and Lebanese International University - LIU. She also worked as a director/editor in two cinema critique episodes in the program "Al-Adasa Al-Arabia", for Al-Jazeera TV.

After her MA from London, Hamze is credited for taking on the most challenging daring roles throughout the Middle East. Consistently ranked among the region's highest paid actors in 2016, she is best known for her hit movies "The Book of Law" (2009), "Beirut Hotel" (2011), "Single, Married, Divorced- Yalla A’belkon" (2015), "Halal Love" (2016), and "Nuts" (2017). She has won many local and international acting awards, including Japan's Audience Award in Fukuoka Film Festival 2016 for her starring role in film "Halal Love", and the Best Actress Award from Algeria's Oran International Film Festival 2017 for her starring role in film "NUTS".

In 2016 she founded an entertainment production company, which she currently runs, and has since produced several films, documentaries and ads while continuing to support freedom of speech, youth for arts not war, and help the new generation accept their voices, talents by empowering young girls and to thrive and achieve their full potential.

== International film acting career ==
Credited as one of the best Arab actresses for taking on challenging and complex roles in different dialects and languages throughout the region, her international film career began in 2009 starring in a big Iranian acclaimed feature film The Book of Law - Ketabe Ghanoon, co-starring legendary Iranian movie star Parviz Parastui and directed by Maziar Miri, in which Hamze studied intensive Persian dialect for it. The film had some controversy at first for criticizing the way Islam was being practiced erroneously in certain societies in Iran but was later on accepted as a smart amusing self-critiquing social romantic comedy and was a big hit and has since become a cult-underground film.

Her next unique role was in 2011's French/Lebanese controversial film Beirut Hotel opposite French actor Charles Berling, directed by Danielle Arbid, which made a huge controversy because of its political sub-text and explicit scenes. Hamze took on the challenge this time to portray (Zoha) a wild romantic alternative singer that falls in love with a French spy. Hamze practiced her French and even took singing classes which made the film's soundtrack, with her voice, a hit. But the film was banned in Lebanon due to suggestive scenes depicting the Lebanese government as covering up some kind of information regarding the assassination of former Prime Minister Rafic Hariri. However, the film aired in France and Germany on Arte, and Hamze was bombarded by opposing opinions for playing such a daring role. She was praised by the liberal audiences and out-shun by conformists in a number of Arab societies, for playing the French audacious role.

In 2016 Hamze first came to the attention of the American audiences with her performance in the German/Lebanese film Halal Love (and sex), directed by Assad Fouladkar and produced by Razor Films, which screened at the US film festivals Sundance and The Hamptons as well as many other international film festivals and screened the Golden Globes HFPA nominations. She depicted the dreamy role of "Loubna", a Muslim divorced woman trying to live her love life and desires without breaking any of her religion's rules, and in it she took on the taboo topic of the Islamic pleasure marriage (which is a short-term contract marriage). As Hamze accepted an Award for it in Japan (Fukuoka International Film Festival 2016) she confirmed that she "looks for roles that challenge her psychologically and mentally, as well as fill her human emotions to stimulate evolution, because film is also a window into other people’s worlds, a small peak into the other’s point of view, which can help wake up society’s humanity and lend a hand in bring humans together. And that she hopes that with every character she plays she brings a voice to those hidden closed windows that can help unite races, religions and cultures through the common grounds of art".

== Filmography ==
=== Films ===
Year	Title	Notes
2002	Her Absurdity	Short film
2002	Flat, Pale, White Hands	Short film; director
2003	The Park	Short film
2004	I-Axis / Skin Plasticity	Short film; director
2008	Drabzin	Short film
2008	Rebirth	Iranian film
2009	Majnouni	Short film
2009	The Book of Law	Iranian feature film
2010	South of Heaven	Iranian film
2011	Beirut Hotel	French-Lebanese feature film
2013	Betroit	Lebanese-American feature film
2015	Halal Love (Bil Halal)	German-Lebanese feature film
2015	Single, Married, Divorced, Yalla Aabelkon	Lebanese feature film
2016	Yalla Aabelkon Shabeb – Part 2	Lebanese feature film
2017	NUTS	Lebanese-French feature film

=== Television ===
Year	Title	Notes
2001	Talbeen El Orb	LBCI
2006	Hkeyit Aayda	LBCI
2007	911	LBC SAT
2009	Al-Dawama	Syria TV
2009	Adventures of Jad & Nour	OTV
2010	Selim w Distit Harim	MBC
2010	Aala El-aahed	New TV
2011	Al-Ghaliboun	Lebanese series
2011	Al-Chahroura	Egyptian-Lebanese series
2012	Khotot Hamraa	Egyptian series
2012	Zay Elward	Egyptian series
2013	Ghazl El Banet	LBCI
2014	Halawet Alrouh	Syrian-Lebanese-Tunisian series
2014	Ahl Alexandria	Egyptian series
2015	Alarab Part 1	Syrian series
2015	Ahmad W Christina	MTV
2015	Teen Wolf	MTV
2015	Abna wa qatala	MTV
2016	Shahadit Milad	ON Cairo
2016	Alarab Part 2	Syrian series
2018	Forsa Akhira	Bein Drama TV
2019	Beirut Bride	MBC

=== Other works ===
Year	Title	Notes
2006	Alaadasa Alarabia	Documentary; director
2008	Hamil Outer Bladi	Music video
