= Whirimako Black =

Whirimako Black MNZM
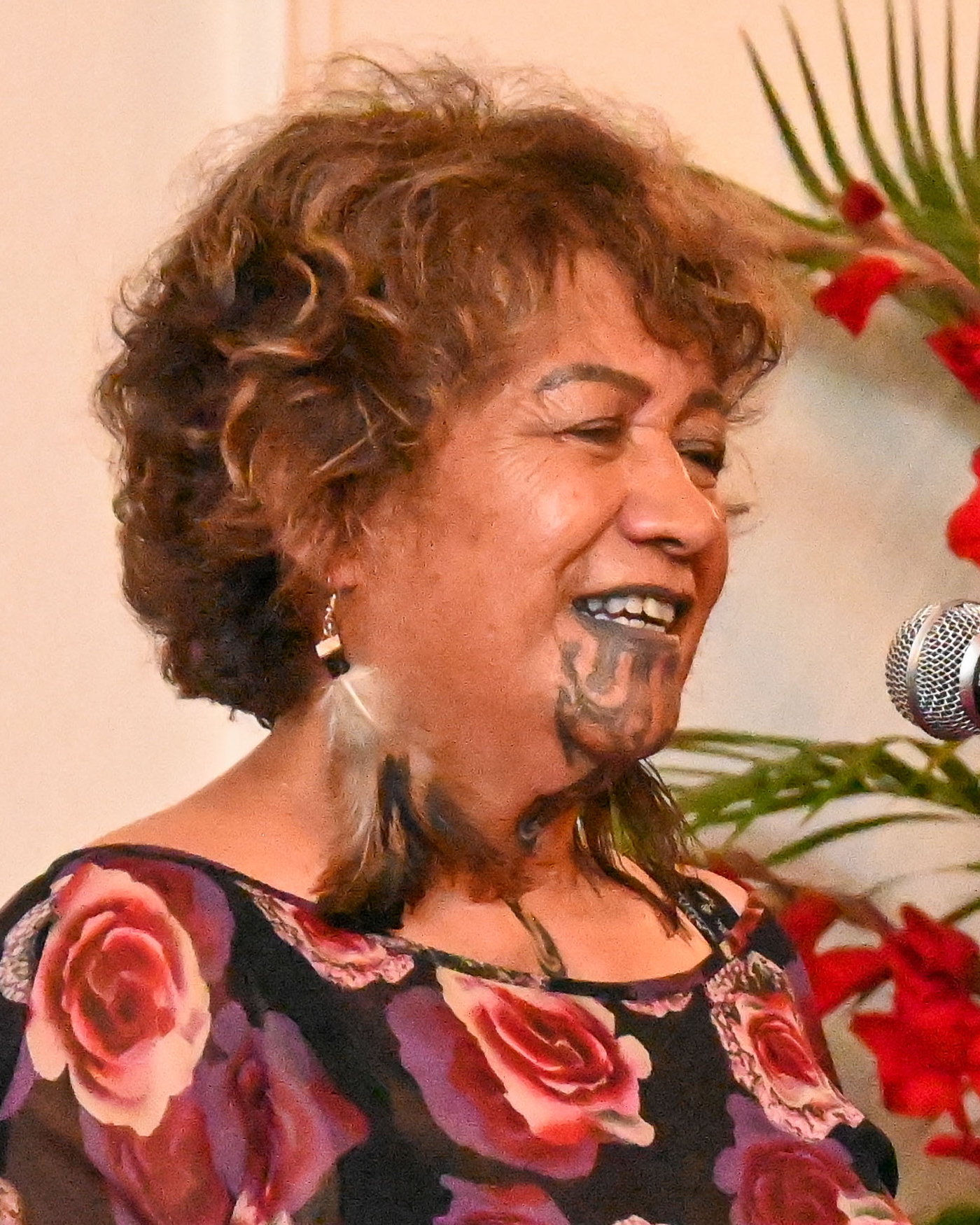
- Black in 2024

Background information
- Origin: New Zealand
- Genres: World music, jazz, soul
- Years active: 2000–present

Barbara Whirimako Black MNZM (born c. 1961) is a New Zealand Māori recording artist and actress.

Black sings mostly in the Māori language, uses traditional Māori musical forms, and collaborates with traditional taonga pūoro instruments. Her musical achievements include composing and singing the titles for the acclaimed Television New Zealand series, The New Zealand Wars, as well as composing with Hori Tait the initial title music for the Māori news programme, Te Karere. In 1991, she formed the female Māori band Tuahine Whakairo but left in 1993, to start a solo career.

Born in Whakatāne, Black is of Ngāti Tūhoe, Ngāti Tuwharetoa, Ngāti Ranginui, Ngāti Kahungunu, Te Whakatōhea, Te Whānau-ā-Apanui, Te Arawa, and Ngāti Awa descent.

Black bears a traditional Māori tattoo, or moko kauae, on her face.

In the 2006 New Year Honours, Black was appointed a Member of the New Zealand Order of Merit, for services to Māori music.

Black made her acting debut in the 2013 film White Lies. She was nominated for the Asia Pacific Screen Award for Best Performance by an Actress.

== Discography ==
Year	Album	Label
2000	Hinepukohurangi: Shrouded in the Mist	Muscle Music
2003	Hohou Te Rongo: Cultivate Peace	Mai Music
2004	Tangihaku	Mai Music
2005	Kura Huna	Mai Music
2006	Soul Sessions	Mai Music
2007	Whirimako Black Sings	Mai Music
