= Bahram Dehghani =

Iranian film editor

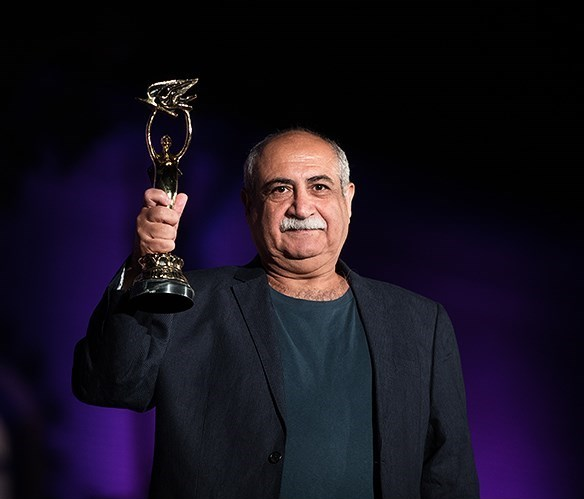
- Born: Shiraz, Iran
- Occupation: Film editor
- Years active: 1985–present
- Awards: 5 Crystal Simorgh Gharche Sami, Asemane Zarde Kam Omgh, Abad va Yek Rooz, Cold Sweat, Just 6.5

Bahram Dehghani (born November 1954), also known as Bahram Dehghan, is an Iranian film editor. He studied film editing and graduated from the USC School of Cinematic Arts in Los Angeles.

He has edited more than 70 movies and won five Crystal Simorgh’s from Fajr International Film Festival for Gharche Sami, Asemane Zarde Kam Omgh, Abad va Yek Rooz, Cold Sweat and Just 6.5

== Education ==
Dehghan received a high school diploma from Pahlavi University High School, Shiraz, 1973.

He received his associate degree in Film Production in Editing from School of Cinema & Television, Tehran, in 1975.

His studies were continued in the field of cinema at the Faculty of South California (USC), Los Angeles, California, United States of America, from 1977 to 1980.

He holds an honorary Doctorate Degree from Ministry of Islamic Culture and Enlightenment, which he received in 2007.

== Filmography ==
- jedal (1985)
- Mahi (1987)
- Simorgh (1987)
- Setareh va Almas (1988)
- Ta ghoroob (1988)
- kakoli (1989)
- Tamame vasvasehaye zamin (1989)
- Ali va ghoole jangal (1990)
- Eshgh va marg(1990)
- sokoot (1990)
- chon abr dar Bahran (1990)
- Madreseye piremardha (1991)
- Ilia naghashe javan (1991)
- Sayehaye hojoom (1992)
- Ilia (1992)
- Baziche (1992)
- Man zamin ra doost daram (1993)
- Oboor az tale (1993)
- Booye khoshe zendegi (1994)
- Alo!Alo! man jojooal (1994)
- Mah o khorshid (1995)
- Ziafat (1995)
- Boradehaye khorshid (1995)
- Saghar (1997)
- Sibe sorkhe hava (1998)
- Zesht o Ziba (1998)
- Motevalede mahe mehr (1999)
- Sharareh (1999)
- Delbakhteh (1999)
- To ra doost daram (1999)
- Les Enfants du pétrole (2000)
- Haft Pardeh (2000)
- Akhare bazi (2000)
- The Hidden Half (2001)
- Gharche sami (2001)
- Koodakaneh (2002)
- Rooze karnameh(2002)
- Jayi digar (2002)
- Bar bad rafteh (2002)
- Mazra'eye Pedari (2002)
- Ghadamgah (2003)
- Iron Island (2004)
- Baj khor (2003)
- So Close, So Far (2004)
- Avai az Doordast (2004)
- Online Murder (2005)
- Royaye khis (2005)
- Taghato' (2005)
- Parvanei dar meh (2005)
- Pa berahne dar behesht (2005)
- Bar bad rafteh (2005)
- Az doordast (2005)
- Rami (2006)
- Parkvey (2006)
- Padashe sokoot (2006)
- Eghlima (2006)
- Le Bus de nuit (2007)
- Har shab tanhai (2007)
- Hamoon va darya (2007)
- Shab (2007)
- Setayesh (2007)
- Niloofar (2007)
- Doost dashtan ra heji kon (2007)
- Zadboom (2008)
- Yek vajab az Aseman (2008)
- Kalantarie gheyre entefa'i (2008)
- Khabhaye donbale dar (2009)
- Tala va Mes (2009)
- Aal (2009)
- Sange aval (2010)
- Parseh dar Meh (2010)
- Gheseye Paria (2010)
- Here Without Me (2011)
- Gonahkaran (2012)
- Shir too shir (2012)
- The Wooden Bridge (2012)
- Ehtemale ma'koos (2012)
- Esterdad (2013)
- Asemane Zarde kam omgh (2013)
- Lampe 100 (2012)
- Rokhe divaneh (2015)
- Ta'me shirine khial (2015)
- Nazdiktar (2015)
- Man digeo Maradona hastam (2015)
- 360 daraje (2015)
- Asphyxia (2017)
- Abad va Yek Rooz (2016)
- Mahi (2016)
- Negar (2017)
- Getting Even (2017)
- Domestic Killer (2017)
- Vilaieha (2017)
- Astigmatism (2018)
- Cold Sweat (2018)
- Centipede (2018)
- African Violet (2019)
- Nabat (2019)
- The Agitation (2019)
- Tsunami (2019)
- Jandar (2019)
- Just 6.5 (2019)
- Ide-ye Asli (2019)
- Hasti va Zaman (2019)

=== Other credits ===
==== Director ====
- Tadvin, Abas Ganjavi (2006) Documentary movie

==== Assistant director ====
- Ganj (1984)
- Gomshode (1985)
- Khate Payan (1985)
- Shabahe kajdom (1985–6)
- Paeezan (1986)
- Parandeye Koochake Khoshbakhti (1987)
- Setare va Almas (1988)
- Ta ghoroub (1988)

==== Director's advisor ====
- Tamame Vasvasehaye Zamin (1989)
- Boradehaye Khorshid (1996)

==== Short film editing ====
- kalagh (1973)
- Nakhle bisar (1974)
- Khorshide Kavir (1975)
- Bagh (1989)
- Dashtha (1992)
- Sal Tahvil (1992)
- Khane Sefid ast (1998)
- Se Hadese (1999)
- Darsi Baraye Farda (2001)
- Pendar (2002)
- Afghani (2003)
- Manteghe Motlaghe yek Etefagh (2004)
- Ravayate Shetabzade (2005)
- Naghashi (2007)
- Dandane Abi (2007)

==== Television programs (serials) as an editor ====
- Marge Tadrijie yek Roya (2007–8)
- Sarzamine Kohan (2009)

== Educational activities ==
- He taught at the Iran Broadcasting University (School of Cinema and Television) from 1975 to 1977 as an assistant professor.
- He began independently teaching in the field of film editing from 1977 at the School of Cinema and Television.
- He has been teaching at the Faculty of Radio and Television/Faculty of Cinema Theatre/ Soureh Faculty and Privates Educational Institutes since 1985.

== Publications ==
- Translation of storybook titled "3rd Type Close Clash"/1983
- Translation of storybook titled "Network"/1984
- Translation of Scenario of the film Passenger, Directed by Michelangelo Antonioni/1995
- Gathering the 9-part collection of introduction to the World's Cinema in the occasion of the centenary celebration of Cinema
- Translation of a book titled "In a Blink of An Eye", written by Walter Murch (about Film Editing)/2000

== Other activities ==
- Member of the Founder's Board of Iranian Film Editors Society in 1991
- Member of the Board of Directors of Iranian Film Editors Society since 1991 till 2003
- Member of the Board of Directors of Khane Cinema since 1998 till 2004
- Juror of the Youth Cinema Festival
- Juror of Khane Cinema in conferring awards (statues) to the winners
- Member of the board of Directors of Iranian Film Editors Society Since 2007 till present

== Awards ==
- Winner of Award (Statue) for the Best Film Editing in 2000 from Khane Cinema for Motevalede Mahe Mehr
- Winner of Award (Statue) for the Best Film Editing in 2001 from Khane Cinema for Bachehaye Naft
- Winner of Crystal Simorgh for the Best Film Editing in 2001 from 20th Fajr International Film Festival for Gharche Sami
- Winner of Award (Statue) for the Best Film Editing in 2000 from Iranian Society of Cinema Instructors for Motevalede Mahe Mehr
- Winner of Award for the Best Film Editing in 2002 from the 9th Holy Defence Film Festival for Gharche Sami
- Winner of Award for the Best Film Editing in 2001 from Faculty of Cinema and Theatre for Gharche Sami
- Winner of Award (Statue) for the Best Film Editing in 2004 from Khane Cinema for Mazra'eye Pedari
- Film Critic Award for Best Achievement in Editing For So Close, So Far in 2005
- Film Critic Award for Best Achievement in Editing For Otobuse Shab in 2007
- Winner of Crystal Simorgh for the Best Film Editing in 2013 from 31st Fajr International Film Festival for Asemane Zarde Kam Omgh
- Film Critic Award for Best Achievement in Editing For Asemane Zarde Kam Omgh in 2013
- Film Critic Award for Best Achievement in Editing For Man Diego Maradona Hastam in 2015
- Winner of Crystal Simorgh for the Best Film Editing in 2016 from 34th Fajr International Film Festival for Abad va Yek Rooz
- Winner of Crystal Simorgh for the Best Film Editing in 2018 from 36th Fajr International Film Festival for Cold Sweat
- Winner of Crystal Simorgh for the Best Film Editing in 2019 from 37th Fajr International Film Festival for Just 6.5
