= Rambod Javan =

Iranian actor

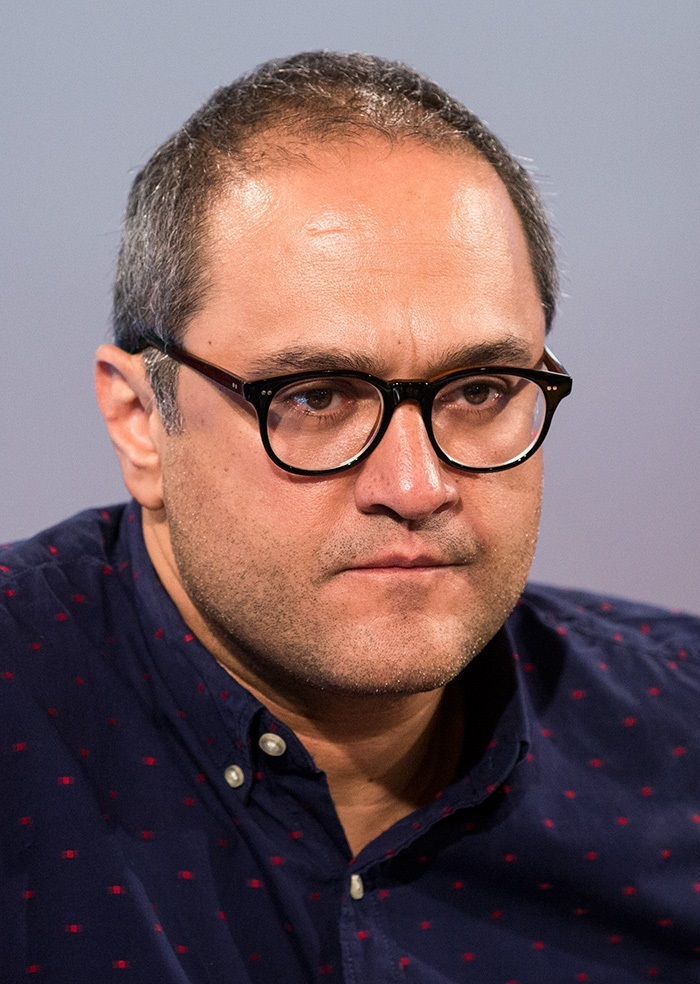
- Javan in 2018
- Born: Rambod Javan Tabrizi; 22 December 1971 (age 54); Tehran, Imperial State of Iran
- Citizenship: Iran
- Education: Islamic Azad University
- Occupations: Actor; Director; TV Host; Screenwriter
- Years active: 1994–present
- Height: 1.74 m (5 ft 9 in)
- Spouses: Mandana Rouhi (m. 2001; div. 2005) Sahar Dolatshahi (m. 2008; div. 2014) Negar Javaherian (m. 2016)
- Children: 2

Rambod Javan (Persian: رامبد جوان; born 22 December 1971) is an Iranian actor, director, TV host and the author of many screenplays. Rambod Javan has made and directed a locally famous TV program, Khandevane. Khandevane has so far had 8 successful seasons.

== Career ==
Javan began stage acting in 1991.

Three years later, he came into the spotlight with a short role in The Spouses (1995) series and found fame after appearing in the series The Green House (1995).

He is more known as a comedic actor.

In 2002, he directed his first series, Lost, which was broadcast during the fasting month of Ramadan and was well-received by both viewers and critics.

Rambod made his film-directing debut with Spaghetti in 8 minutes (2005) and received a Fajr International Film Festival Phoenix for Best supporting Actor in Sinners (2012).

His diverse roles in Mummy 3 (1999) and A Place of Love (2000) made him a versatile actor.

Many critics, however, believe Pink (2003) was the apex of his acting career. He was nominated for a Fajr International Film Festival Crystal Phoenix for Best Actor for Pink.

Rambod has appeared in many other series and movies, including Born Again (1997), Help Me (1997), The Magic Coat (1998), Maxx (2004), Souvenir from Abroad (2006), The Music Box (2007), Adam's Son, Eve's Daughter (2009), No Men Allowed (2009), The Lab (2011), and Conditional Release (2013).

Javan appeared in an episode of the popular TV series, The Spouses. He also appeared in the television series, The Green House, playing the humorous character of Farid Sabahi.

Rambod Javan is the son of two Iranian Azerbaijani parents. He briefly married Mandana Rouhi until their divorce some years later. Javan remarried Iranian actress Sahar Dolatshahi in 2008, and they divorced in 2014.

== Filmography ==
=== Television series ===
Year	Title	Role	Network	Notes
1994	Save water		–	
199۳	norouz 1995		–	
199۳	The Spouses		IRIB TV2	
199۳	Store		IRIB TV3	
1996	The Green House	Farid "Jinglebird" Sabahi	IRIB TV2	
1997	The Green Land	Farid "Jinglebird" Sabahi	IRIB TV2	
1997	In the vicinity		–	Writer
1997	Rebirth		–	Writer
1998	The Magic coat	Emad	IRIB TV3	
1998	Hotel	cameo	IRIB TV1	
2000	Province of Love	Amin abasi	IRIB TV1	
2001	Lost		IRIB TV3	Director
2002	Crystal Garden		–	
2008	Address		IRIB TV2	
2009	The Passengers	Farid Afrookhteh	IRIB TV3	Director, actor
2010	Family Plot		IRIB TV1	Director
2011	Doctors' Building	Wooer of Miss Shirzad (cameo)	IRIB TV3	
2013	Red Hat	Himself (cameo)	IRIB TV2	
2013	Pejman	Himself (cameo)	IRIB TV3	

=== Film ===
Year	Title	Role	Notes
1997	Behind the walls evening		
1997	Help me		
1999	Mummy 3	Behrouz	
2000	Cinderella		
2003	Pink		
2004	Maxx		
2004	Spaghetti in eight minutes	Pedram Aram	Actor and Director
2006	Magical generation		
2006	Souvenirs Europe		
2006	Woman Costume		
2007	Polyphone		
2008	A night in Tehran		
2010	Beauty and beast		
2010	Son of Adam, Daughter of Eve	Naser Nik Khu	Actor and Director
2010	Parian king 's daughter		
2011	No Men Allowed		Director
2011	Laboratory		
2012	Sinners	Officer Nader Ravangar	
2012	Nikan and Giant baby		
2013	Azar, Shahdokht Parviz and Others	Bahram Kiani	
2013	Parole		
2014	Jumping from a low altitude		
2015	A Minor Leap Down		
2017	Negar		Director
2018	Murphy's Law	Manoucher	Actor and Director
2018	Gold		Producer
2023	Pressure Cooker		Director

=== Variety shows ===
Year	Title	Role	Network	Notes
2011	Navad (90)	Guest	IRIB TV3	
2012	Chat	Host	IFILM	Presenter
2014 – present	Khandevane	Host	IRIB Nasim	Presenter, director
2016	3 Stars	Guest	IRIB TV3	
2017	3 Stars	Guest	IRIB TV3	
2019	dorehami	IRIB Nasim	Guest	
2024	Carnival	Host	Filmnet	Presenter, director

== Awards and nominations ==
Year	Award	Category	Nominated work	Result
2005	20th Children and Adolescents International Film Festival	Best Dir'ector	Spaghetti in 8 minutes	Won
2012	31st Fajr International Film Festival	Best Supporting Actor	Sinners	Won
2014	14th Hafez Awards	Best Cinama Man Actor	Sinners	Nominated
2015	15th Hafez Awards	Best TV Program	Khandevane	Won
2016	16th Hafez Awards	Best TV Presenter	Khandevane	Nominated
2017	35th Fajr International Film Festival	Best Director	Negar	Nominated
2017	3rd 3Stars	Best Entertainment TV Program	Khandevane	Nominated
2017	3rd 3Stars	Best TV Presenter	Khandevane	Nominated
2017	17th Hafez Awards	Best TV Presenter	Khandevane	Nominated
2018	18th Hafez Awards	Best Movie Director	Negar	Nominated
2018	18th Hafez Awards	Best TV Presenter	Khandevane	Nominated
2019	19th Hafez Awards	Best TV Presenter	Khandevane	Nominated
2020	20th Hafez Awards	Best Movie	Gold	Nominated
2025	24th Hafez Awards	Best Combination Show	Carnival	Won
2025	24th Hafez Awards	Best TV Presenter	Carnival	Nominated
