= The Painting Pool =

- Directed by: Maziar Miri
- Written by: Hamed Mohammadi
- Produced by: Manouchehr Mohammadi
- Starring: Shahab Hosseini; Negar Javaherian; Fereshteh Sadre Orafaee; Sepehrad Farzami; Siamak Ehsaei; Elham Korda
- Distributed by: Iranian Independents
- Release date: 13 March 2013
- Running time: 90 minutes
- Country: Iran
- Language: Persian

The Painting Pool (Persian: حوض نقاشی, translit. Hoze Naghashi) is a 2013 Iranian drama film written and directed by Maziar Miri. The film released on 13 March 2013 in Tehran and centers upon the interpersonal dynamics between a set of mentally challenged parents and their child. Iran reviewed the movie as a potential selection for contention for a 2014 Academy Award for Best Foreign Language Film, but did not select the film.

== Synopsis ==
Maryam (Negar Javaherian) and Reza (Shahab Hosseini) try to do their best in life, but are met with several obstacles due to being mentally challenged. Their son Soheil was born without any defects and initially does not realize how his parents differ from other adults until he begins to grow older. This leads to complications when his teachers request that his mother come to school for a parent-teacher conference, as Soheil is afraid that his parents will humiliate him. As a result, Soheil spends more and more time with Amirali, his teacher's son, and eventually moves in with them after his father loses his job.

== Cast ==
- Shahab Hosseini as Reza
- Negar Javaherian as Maryam
- Hojjat Hassanpour as Mohsen
- Fereshteh Sadre Orafaiy
- Sepehrad Farzami
- Siamak Ehsaei
- Elham Korda

== Reception ==
Serat News reviewed the film.

== Awards and nominations ==
Year	Award	Category	Recipient	Result
2013	Iran's Film Critics and Writers Association	Honour Diploma	Shahab Hosseini	Won
2013	31st Fajr Film Festival	Audience Award Best Film	The Painting Pool	Won
2013	31st Fajr Film Festival	Best Set & Costume Design	Atoosa Ghalamfarsaie	Won
2013	31st Fajr Film Festival	Best Actress	Negar Javaherian	Nominated
2013	31st Fajr Film Festival	Best Cinematography	Mohammad Aladpoush	Nominated
2013	Asia Pacific Screen Awards	UNESCO Award	The Painting Pool	Won
2013	Asia Pacific Screen Awards	Best Performance by an Actress	Negar Javaherian	Nominated
2014	Lisboa Film Festival	Special Best Actor	Shahab Hosseini	Won
2014	Sharjah International Children's Film Festival	Best Film	The Painting Pool	Won
