= Khandevane =

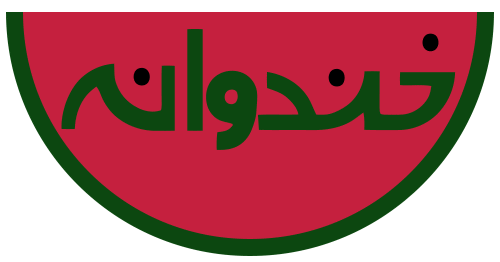
- Also known as: خندوانه
- Genre: Comedy; Interview; Stand-up comedy
- Written by: amiralihooshyar
- Directed by: Rambod Javan
- Presented by: Rambod Javan
- Theme music composer: Habib Badiri; Hooman "Gamno" Shahi
- Country of origin: Iran
- Original language: Persian
- No. of seasons: 8
- No. of episodes: 922

Production
- Producers: Javad Farahani; Ali Ahmadi
- Cinematography: Farhad Jaberi Yazdi
- Editor: Mehdi Ghanbari
- Camera setup: Behrang Dezfoolizadeh
- Running time: 80 min to 120 min
- Production companies: MTN Irancell; *780# Snowa

Original release
- Network: IRIB Nasim
- Release: June 11, 2014 – present

Khandevane or Khandevaneh /xændeva:ne/ (Persian: خندوانه (portmanteau of خنده laughter and هندوانه watermelon) is an Iranian telecast directed by Rambod Javan. It first aired on 11 June 2014 on Nasim channel. The program is focused on showing that there should not be any reason not to laugh using various acts such as stand-up comedy. It aired on cable network IRIB Nasim on Wednesdays to Fridays at 23:00 (IST). For its first two seasons, the program consisted of several parts like: Stand-up comedy, Live music, and Interviews. Other programs include: Report of the people, Competition in the studio, Sms Competition for featured viewers, and Lottery. A new item added to the show from its third season is Labahang (Lip sync). It is proclaimed by the program that it is adapted from Lip Sync Battle.

Several artists made original songs for the show: Gamno, Habib Badiri, Bomrani, Maziar Sarmeh, Mohsen Chavoshi, Reza Yazdani, and many others.

The program is hosted by Rambod Javan and Nima Shabannejad. There is also a doll, Jenab Khan participating in the show. It has spawned a spin-off, which has mainly the same elements but omitted the audience, called Ghaach (Persian: قاچ) (means Slice). Its first season began as a tie-in to 2018 World Cup, and the second season was launched alongside the Season 6 of Khandevane.

== Hosts ==
- Rambod Javan
- Jenab Khan
- Nima Shabannejad

== Elements ==
- Rambod Javan (Designer, Director and Presenter)
- Mohammad-Fuad Safarianpour (Art Director)
- Ali Ahmadi (Producer)
- Sajjad Afsharian (Author)
- Bahram Azimi (Making Titles and Animation)
- Habib Badiri and Hooman "Gamno" Shahi (Singer and Composer)
- Mahmoud Karimi (Reporter)
- Behrouz Baghai (Reporter Provinces - Season 2)
- Abolfazl Sabbagh (Reporter London - Season 2)
- Mehdi Shah-Hosseini (Stage Manager)
- Bozorgmehr Hosseinpour (Thinker)

=== Actors ===
- Mohammad Bahrani (voice Jenab Khan)
- Nima Shaban Nejad
- Danial Ghafar Zadeh
- Arzhang Amirfazli

== Episodes ==
- Season 1: 11 June 2014 - 25 October 2014 (114 episodes)
- Season 2: 18 April 2015 - 13 October 2015 (157 episodes)
- Season 3: 15 March 2016 - 1 October 2016 (137 episodes)
- Season 4: 20 December 2016 - 19 September 2017 (187 episodes)
- Season 5: 16 May 2018 - 7 September 2018 (42 episodes)
- Season 6: 21 November 2018 - 5 April 2019 (49 episodes + 16 Nowruz specials)
- Season 7: 10 March 2021 - TBA

== Awards and nominations ==
Year	Award	Category	Recipient	Result
2015	15th Hafez Awards	Best TV Program	Rambod Javan	Won
2016	2nd 3Stars	Best Entertainment TV Program	Khandevane	Won
2016	16th Hafez Awards	Best TV Presenter	Rambod Javan	Nominated
2017	3rd 3Stars	Best Entertainment TV Program	Khandevane	Nominated
2017	3rd 3Stars	Best TV Presenter	Rambod Javan	Nominated
2017	17th Hafez Awards	Best TV Presenter	Rambod Javan	Nominated
