= IRIB Nasim =

Iranian TV channel

- Country: Iran
- Broadcast area: Asia
- Headquarters: Tehran

Programming
- Language: Persian
- Picture format: 16:9 (576i, SDTV) 16:9 (1080p, HDTV)

Ownership
- Owner: IRIB
- Sister channels: IRIB UHD

History
- Launched: 17 September 2013

Links
- Website: www.tvnasim.ir

Availability

Terrestrial
- Jamaran: CH37 UHF Digital

Streaming media
- IRIB Nasim Live Streaming

IRIB Nasim (Persian: شبكۀ نسیم, romanized: Shæbækeh-ye Næsîm), is an Islamic Republic of Iran Broadcasting television channel, broadcast worldwide.

The channel is one of the newer television channels in Iran and was launched on 17 September 2013 as a test airing only in Tehran, which officially established on 7 May 2014 and began airing nationally on 24 December 2014. The channel's a free to air 24-hour-a-day broadcast includes fun and entertainment programs. The Persian name for the channel is an acronym for "نشاط، سرگرمی، یادگاری، مسابقه" (lit. Fun, Entertainment, Memories, Challenges).

== TV programs ==
- Khandevane
- Dorehami
- Abrang (Watercolor)
- Haavang (Pestle)
- Shabi Ba Abdi
- Shekar Abad
- Vitamin Kh
- Na-Sim-Khardar (No-Barb-Wire)
- Dast Nazan Jizze (Don't Touch, It Hurts)
- Dast be Naghd (Criticizing)
- Dobare Goush Kon (Listen Again)
- Chand Daraje (Some Degree)
- Ketab Baz (Open Book)
- Hoosh e Bartar (Superior intelligence)
- ShabKook (Night-tuned)
- BiSim (Wireless)
- Dast andaz (bumpiness)

== TV Drama ==
- Halat e Khas (Special Case) (2016)
- In Way of Home (2017)
