= List of Palestinian submissions for the Academy Award for Best International Feature Film =

Best International Feature Film submissions from Palestine

Highlights
- Debut: 2003
- Submissions: 19
- Nominations: 2
- Oscar winners: none

Palestine has submitted films for consideration for the Academy Award for Best International Feature Film (Note: The category was previously named the Academy Award for Best Foreign Language Film, but this was changed to the Academy Award for Best International Feature Film in April 2019, after the Academy deemed the word "Foreign" to be outdated.) since 2003. The country had also attempted to submit a film in 2002. The Foreign Language Film award is handed out annually by the United States Academy of Motion Picture Arts and Sciences to a feature-length motion picture produced outside the United States that contains primarily non-English dialogue. The award was created for the 1956 Academy Awards, succeeding the non-competitive Honorary Academy Awards which were presented between 1947 and 1955 to the best foreign language films released in the United States.

As of 2026, Palestine has been nominated twice, for Paradise Now (2005) and Omar (2013).

== History ==
=== Recognition by AMPAS ===
Palestine had originally asked the Academy of Motion Picture Arts and Sciences permission to submit Divine Intervention in 2002, but was reportedly advised that the film would not be accepted since Palestine was not internationally recognized as a country, and because the film had not been selected by a national jury as required by official rules. The decision to bar the country on the basis of nationality proved controversial, especially since other entities without international recognition, including Hong Kong, Puerto Rico and Taiwan, had long participated in the competition, receiving several Oscar nominations. The Academy of Motion Picture Arts and Sciences relented a year later, and allowed the film to compete.

=== Name of the country ===
When AMPAS announces their "longlist" of eligible foreign films each year, the Palestinian submission is designated as the representative of "Palestine". However, when Paradise Now succeeding in getting an Oscar nomination under this moniker, pro-Israeli groups in the United States objected to the name. After intense lobbying from Jewish groups, the academy decided to designate Paradise Now as a submission from the Palestinian Authority, a move that was decried by the film's director Hany Abu-Assad. As a compromise, the film was eventually announced as a submission from the Palestinian Territories. Subsequent to this, Salt of this Sea was once again recognized on AMPAS' official website as the representative of Palestine.

In 2014, Academy of Motion Picture Arts and Sciences named Palestine as the place of origin for Hany Abu-Assad's Omar (2013), rather than the Palestinian territories, the designation used for Hany Abu-Assad's earlier work Paradise Now (2005).

== Submissions ==
The Academy of Motion Picture Arts and Sciences has invited the film industries of various countries to submit their best film for the Academy Award for Best International Feature Film since 1956. The International Feature Film Committee oversees the process and reviews all the submitted films. Following this, they vote via secret ballot to determine the five nominees for the award.

From Ground Zero (2024) and Palestine 36 (2025) advanced to the December shortlists, but were not nominated.

Palestinian filmmaker Annemarie Jacir is the most submitted filmmaker, with four films selected, including: Salt of this Sea (2008), When I Saw You (2012), Wajib (2017), and Palestine 36 (2025).

Other films co-produced by Palestine have been selected to represent Arab or European countries over the years, including: 3000 Nights (2015) by Mai Masri, 200 Meters (2020) by Ameen Nayfeh, and All That's Left of You (2025) by Cherien Dabis, all representing Jordan; and Who Is Still Alive (2025) by Nicolas Wadimoff, representing Switzerland. Other Palestine-set films have also been nominated: Amira (2021) by Mohamed Diab and Farha (2022) by Darin J. Sallam, representing Jordan; and The Voice of Hind Rajab (2025) by Kaouther Ben Hania, representing Tunisia.

Below is a list of the films that have been submitted by Palestine for review by the academy for the award by year. All films were primarily spoken in Arabic.

Year (Ceremony)	English title	Original title	Director(s)	Result
2003 (76th)	Divine Intervention	يد إلهية	Elia Suleiman	Not nominated
2004 (77th)	The Olive Harvest	موسم زيتون	Hanna Elias	Not nominated
2005 (78th)	Paradise Now	الجنّة الآن	Hany Abu-Assad	Nominated
2008 (81st)	Salt of this Sea	ملح هذا البحر	Annemarie Jacir	Not nominated
2012 (85th)	When I Saw You	لما شفتك	Annemarie Jacir	Not nominated
2013 (86th)	Omar	عمر	Hany Abu-Assad	Nominated
2014 (87th)	Eyes of a Thief	عيون الحراميه	Najwa Najjar	Not nominated
2015 (88th)	The Wanted 18	المطلوبون 18	Paul Cowan and Amer Shomali	Not nominated
2016 (89th)	The Idol	يا طير الطاير	Hany Abu-Assad	Not nominated
2017 (90th)	Wajib	واجب	Annemarie Jacir	Not nominated
2018 (91st)	Ghost Hunting	إصطياد اشباح	Raed Andoni	Not nominated
2019 (92nd)	It Must Be Heaven	إن شئت كما في السماء	Elia Suleiman	Not nominated
2020 (93rd)	Gaza mon amour	غزة حبيبتي	Tarzan and Arab Nasser	Not nominated
2021 (94th)	The Stranger	الغريب	Ameer Fakher Eldin	Not nominated
2022 (95th)	Mediterranean Fever	حمى البحر المتوسط	Maha Haj	Not nominated
2023 (96th)	Bye Bye Tiberias	باي باي طبريا	Lina Soualem	Not nominated
2024 (97th)	From Ground Zero	قصص غير محكية من غزة من المسافة صفر	Aws Al-Banna, Ahmed Al-Danf, Basil Al-Maqousi, Mustafa Al-Nabih, Muhammad Alshareef, Ala Ayob, Bashar Al Balbisi, Alaa Damo, Awad Hana, Ahmed Hassouna, Mustafa Kallab, Satoum Kareem, Mahdi Karera, Rabab Khamees, Khamees Masharawi, Wissam Moussa, Tamer Najm, Abu Hasna Nidaa, Damo Nidal, Mahmoud Reema, Etimad Weshah and Islam Al Zrieai	Made shortlist
2025 (98th)	Palestine 36	فلسطين ٣٦	Annemarie Jacir	Made shortlist
2026 (99th)	Citizen Osama	المواطن أسامة	Ahmed Hassouna	Pending

== See also ==
- List of Academy Award winners and nominees for Best International Feature Film
- List of Academy Award-winning foreign language films
- List of Israeli submissions for the Academy Award for Best International Feature Film
