= Maria Zreik =

Palestinian actress (born 1991)

- ماريا زريق
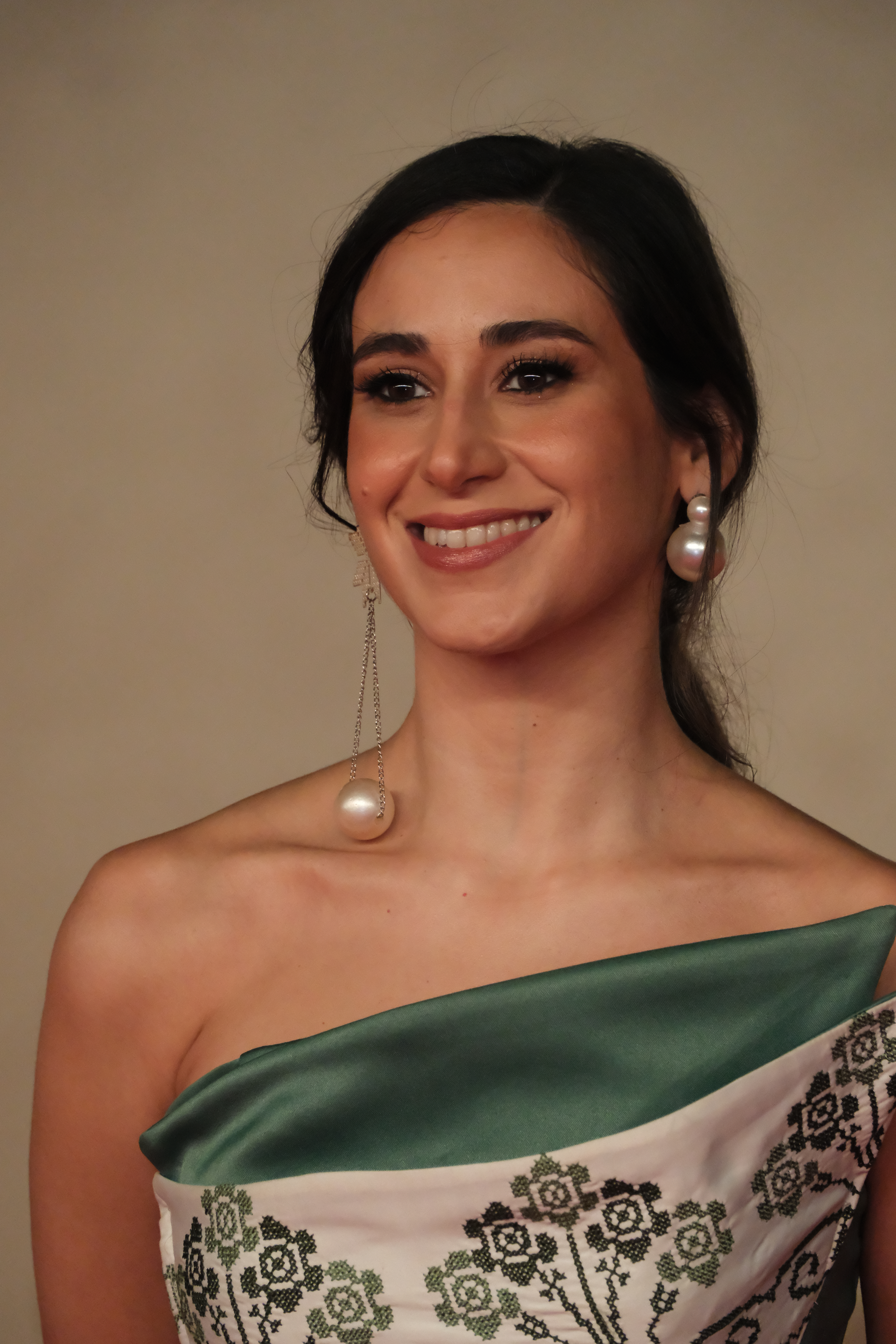
- Zreik in 2025
- Born: 1991 (age 34–35); Haifa, Israel
- Education: University of Haifa
- Occupation: Actress
- Years active: 2011–present
- Known for: Villa Touma (2014); Wajib (2017); Ave Maria (2015)

Maria Zreik (Arabic: ماريا زريق, Hebrew: מריה זריק, also מריה זרייק; born 1991) is a Palestinian actress. She is known for her roles in the films All That's Left of You (2025), Villa Touma (2014), Wajib (2017), and the Oscar-nominated short film Ave Maria (2015).

== Early life and education ==
Maria Zreik is a Palestinian citizen of Israel. She was born in 1991 in Haifa. Her sister Lana Zreik is an artist, her brother Anan is a guitarist, her sister Sana is a nutritionist and ballet dancer, her mother Diana is a music teacher, and her father Imad is a pharmacist.

She completed studies in law at the University of Haifa, but chose an acting career. She started acting while being a law student.

== Career ==
Zreik made her television debut at the age of 17, with a small role in Peter Kosminsky's series The Promise, which aired on the British channel Channel 4 in 2011.

In 2014, she starred in the main cast of the Palestinian film Villa Touma, presented at the 71st Venice International Film Festival. For her portrayal of the young orphan Badia, she won the award for Best Actress at the Mediterranean Experiences Festival in Reggio Calabria. The following year, she gained popularity for her role as Sister Marie in Basil Khalil's short film Ave Maria, which was nominated for the 2016 Academy Awards and screened at the 68th Cannes Film Festival. Her collaboration with the director continued in 2022 with an Arabic-language comedy, A Gaza Weekend.

An emerging star of the 2017 Dubai International Film Festival, Zreik works in both Israel and Palestine. In 2017, she appeared in the multi-award-winning Palestinian comedy Wajib (Duty), directed by Annemarie Jacir, where she played the bride alongside Mohammad Bakri and Saleh Bakri. In 2020, she portrayed Laila in Amos Gitai's film Laila in Haifa, which was presented in competition at the 77th Venice International Film Festival.

Zreik has starred in various short films. Following the success of Ave Maria, she played the role of a Syrian refugee in the American film Detained, directed by Saudi filmmaker Hajar Alnaim. In 2019, the short film Give Up the Ghost, in which she acted alongside Ziad Bakri, was presented in competition at the 76th Venice International Film Festival and won the award for Best Arab Short Film at the El Gouna Film Festival in Egypt.

In 2025, Zreik starred as Munira in Cherien Dabis's generational epic All That's Left of You.

== Selected filmography ==
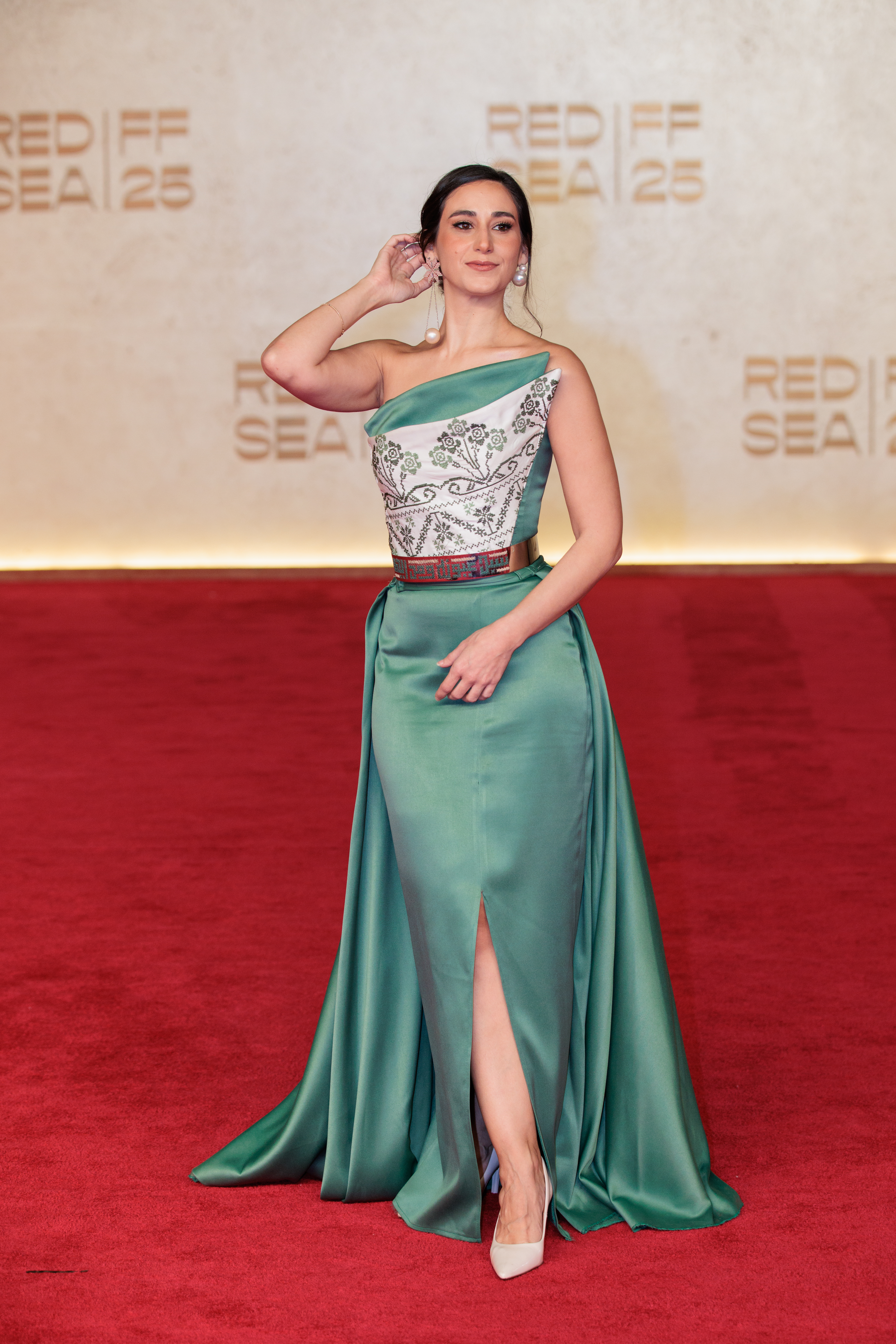
Maria Zreik at the Red Sea International Film Festival, 2025

- 2011: The Promise, TV series, supporting role; debut
- 2014: Villa Touma, a film with her first leading role
- 2015: Ave Maria, short
- 2016: Between Worlds by Miya Hatav
- 2017: Detained, short
- 2017: Wajib (Duty)
- 2019: Give Up the Ghost, short
- 2020: Laila in Haifa
- 2022: A Gaza Weekend
- 2025: All That's Left of You
- 2025: الذئاب (Wolves), a short story of a tired Palestinian surgeon after a night shift on a deserted road in the West Bank
- 2026: Conversation with the Sea

== Awards ==
- 2014: Mediterranean Experiences Festival, Best Actress award in Villa Touma
- 2020: Indian World Film Festival, Best Actress award in Give Up the Ghost
