= Ziad Bakri =

Palestinian actor and filmmaker

- زياد بكري
- Born: March 27, 1980 (age 45); Palestine
- Occupation: Actor
- Father: Mohammad Bakri
- Relatives: Saleh and Adam Bakri (brothers)

Ziad Bakri (Arabic: زياد بكري) is a Palestinian actor and filmmaker. He is the son of film director Mohammad Bakri, and brother of actors Saleh Bakri and Adam Bakri.

== Filmography ==
Year	Title	Role	Director(s)	Notes
2008	The Shooting of Thomas Hurndall	Sgt. Taysir	Rowan Joffé	TV film
2009	Zion and His Brother	George	Eran Merav	
2009	The Time That Remains	Jamal	Elia Suleiman	
2010	Miral	Helmi	Julian Schnabel	
2014	Self Made	Yusuf	Shira Geffen	
2015	Blind Sun	Ashraf Idriss	Joyce A. Nashawati	
2015–2017	The Bureau	Nadim	Éric Rochant	French TV series
2016	Personal Affairs	Hisham	Maha Haj	
2016	Mare Nostrum	Father	Rana Kazkaz and Anas Khalaf	Short film
2018	Screwdriver	Ziad	Bassam Jerbawi	
2019	Give Up The Ghost	Ammar	Zain Duraie	Short film
2020	The Translator	Sami Najjar	Anas Khalaf, Rana Kazkaz	Feature film
2022	The Weekend Away	Zain	Kim Farrant	Feature film
