= Mohammad Bakri =

Palestinian actor and film director (1953–2025)

- محمد بكري
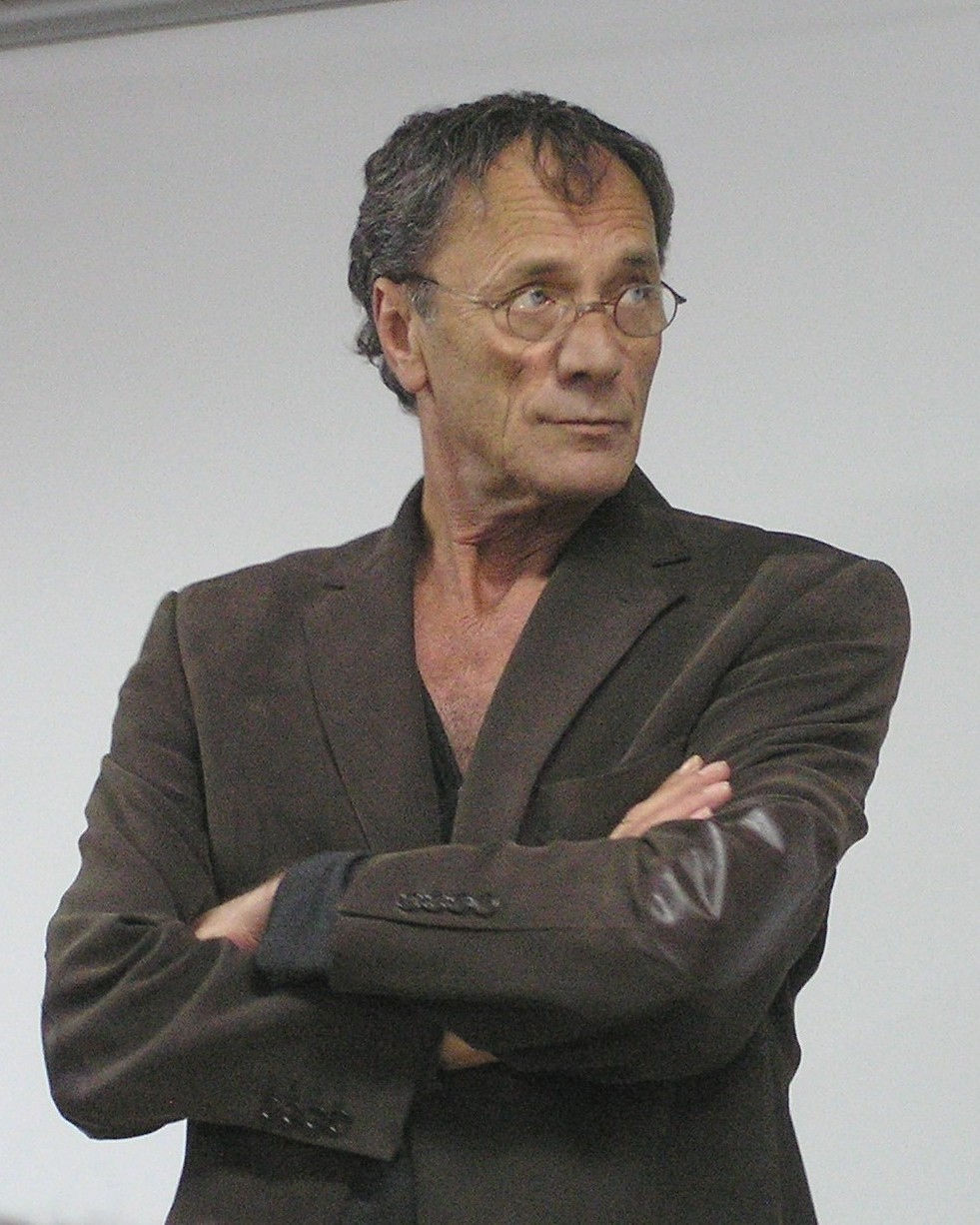
- Bakri in 2010
- Born: 27 November 1953; Bi'ina, Israel
- Died: 24 December 2025 (aged 72); Nahariya, Israel
- Education: Tel Aviv University
- Occupations: Actor; director
- Years active: 1983–2025
- Spouse: Leila
- Children: 6, including Adam, Ziad and Saleh

Mohammad Bakri (Arabic: محمد بكري, Hebrew: מוחמד בכרי; 27 November 1953 – 24 December 2025) was a Palestinian actor and film director with Israeli citizenship. He is often regarded as one of the most preeminent figures in the history of Palestinian cinema and theatre.

== Early life and education ==
Bakri was born into an Arab-Muslim family in the village of Bi'ina in Israel on 27 November 1953. He went to elementary school in his hometown and received his secondary education in the nearby city of Akko. He then studied acting and Arabic literature at Tel Aviv University in 1973 and graduated three years later.

== Acting and film career ==
Bakri began his professional acting career with Habima Theatre in Tel Aviv and al-Kasaba theatre in Ramallah. His one-man plays, The Pessoptimist (1986), The Anchor (1991), Season of Migration to the North (1993) and Abu Marmar (1999), were performed in Hebrew and Arabic. He was featured in Cabaret Voltaire, by Israeli playwright Yuval Rozman.

After a few years of acting in Palestinian and Israeli film, Bakri began to act in international films in France, Belgium, the Netherlands, Denmark, Canada and Italy. He also directed two documentary films including Jenin, Jenin.

== Controversy ==
After Operation Defensive Shield in April 2002, Bakri interviewed residents of the Jenin refugee camp and produced a film based on their testimony, Jenin, Jenin. Some of the survivors described a massacre of hundreds of people. After three showings the film was banned by the Israeli Film Board, which claimed it was not a documentary as it showed only one side of the story. Nevertheless, Bakri showed the film at the Tel Aviv and Jerusalem cinematheques and Arab theatres such as Al-Midan in Haifa.

Bakri petitioned the High Court of Justice for prohibiting the screening of the film on the grounds that it distorted the truth. After a long fight, the court rejected the censor's decision. In 2004, the Israeli High Court finally upheld its earlier overturn of the ban, but joined the Film Board in labeling the film a "propagandistic lie" based on Israeli sources that acknowledged only 52 Palestinian deaths, 38 of whom Israeli sources argued were armed fighters. In response to the court's criticism, Bakri stated that he had "seen hundreds of films that deny and ignore what happened to Palestinians, yet [people have not] complained or tried to ban any film".

In 2007, five soldiers who fought in the Jenin refugee camp during Operation Defensive Shield in 2002 sued the cinematheques in Tel Aviv and Jerusalem for screening the film in the midst of the ban, and sued Bakri for 2.5 million NIS for producing the film. In July 2008, Bakri was acquitted of the charges.

Jenin-Jenin earned two awards: the best film award at the 2002 Carthage International Film Festival and the International Prize for Mediterranean Documentary Filmmaking and Reporting.

Israeli right-wing group Im Tirtzu organized a campaign against Bakri. Im Tirtzu opposed a production of Federico García Lorca's The House of Bernarda Alba in which Bakri played the role of Bernarda. The play was produced in 2012 at Tel Aviv's Tzavta Theater. Israel's Academy of the Performing Arts was behind the production. While refusing Im Tirtzu's request to intervene, Culture Minister Limor Livnat criticized the judgment of the theater's administration.

Bakri consistently emphasized his Palestinian identity throughout his career.

== Personal life and death ==
Bakri was married to Leila and together they had six children. His sons Adam, Ziad and Saleh are also actors.

Bakri died from heart disease at the Galilee Medical Center in Nahariya on 24 December 2025 at the age of 72.

== Filmography ==
=== Actor ===
Year	Title	Role	Director(s)	Country	Notes
1983	Hanna K.	Selim Bakri	Constantin Costa-Gavras	Israel, France	
1984	Beyond the Walls	Issan	Uri Barabash, Eran Preis	Israel	
1986	Esther	Mordecai	Amos Gitai	Israel, UK	
1987	Death Before Dishonor	Gavril	Terry Leonard	U.S.	
1988	Rami og Julie	Rami's cousin	Erik Clausen	Denmark	
1989	Ha Miklat		Rashid Masharawi	Israel	Short film
1989	Foreign Nights	Morod	Izidore K. Musallam	Canada	
1991	Cup Final	Ziad	Eran Riklis	Israel	
1993	The Mummy Lives	Alexatos	Gerry O'Hara	U.S.	
1994	Beyond the Walls II	Issan	Uri Barabash	Israel	
1994	The Tale of the Three Jewels	Aida's father	Michel Khleifi	Palestine, Belgium	
1994	The Milky Way	Mahmud	Ali Nassar	Israel	
1995	Sous les pieds des femmes	Amin 1996	Rachid Krim	France	
1996	Haifa	Haifa	Rashid Masharawi	Palestine, Netherlands	
1997	Desperado Square	Avram Mandabon	Benny Toraty	Israel	
2001	The Body	Abu Yusef	Jonas McCord	U.S.	
2001	The Olive Harvest	Raeda's father	Hannah Elias	Palestine	
2004	Private	Mohammad B.	Saverio Costanzo	Italy	
2005	Yasmine's song	Abu Odeh	Najwa Najjar	Palestine	Short film
2007	The Lark Farm	Nazim	Paolo and Vittorio Taviani	Italy	
2010	Marriage and Other Disasters	Bauer	Nina Di Majo	Italy	
2011	The Salt Fisherman		Ziad Bakri	Palestine	Short film
2013	Stay Human – The Reading Movie	Narrator	Fulvio Renzi	Italy	Chapter XI
2014	Tyrant	Sheik Rashid	Gideon Raff	U.S.	TV series
2016	Of Kings and Prophets	Samuel	Adam Cooper, Bill Collage	U.S.	TV series
2016	The Night Of	Tariq	James Marsh	U.S.	Miniseries
2017	The Bureau	Shahannah	Éric Rochant	France	5 episodes, TV series
2017	Wajib	Abu Shadi	Annemarie Jacir	Palestine	
2017	American Assassin	Ashani	Michael Cuesta	U.S.	
2020	Homeland	Abdu Qadir G'ulom		U.S.	8 episodes, T.V. Series
2021	The Stranger	Abu Adnan	Ameer Fakher Eldin	Palestine	
2025	All That's Left Of You	Older Sharif	Cherien Dabis	Germany, Cyprus	

=== Director ===
Year	Title	Country	Notes
1999	1948	Palestine, Israel	Documentary film
2002	Jenin, Jenin	Palestine	Documentary film
2004	Since You Left	Israel	Documentary film
2009	Zahra	Palestine	Documentary film

== Awards and recognition ==
- Award for the Best Actor for the role in Private in Buenos Aires International Festival of Independent Cinema 2005
- Best Actor Award for Private by Saverio Costanzo, Locarno International Film Festival 2004
- Palestine Prize for Cinema 1999 Ramallah
- Award for the Best Actor for the role in Haifa by Rashid Masharawi, Valencia Festival. 1997
- Award for the Best Actor for the role in Beyond the Walls II by Uri Barabash, Valencia Festival. 1994
- Award for the Best Actor for the role in Beyond the Walls by Uri Barabash, Israel. 1984
- Award for the best actor for the role in Season of Migration to the North, by Tayeb Salih, adapted and directed by Ouriel Zohar, in the Acco Festival of Alternative Israeli Theatre, Israel, 1993.

== See also ==
- List of Palestinians
