= Citizen Osama =

2026 documentary film by Ahmed Hassouna

- International promotional poster
- Arabic: المواطن أسامة
- Directed by: Ahmed Hassouna
- Produced by: Laura Nikolov; Rashid Masharawi; Ahmed Hassouna
- Starring: Osama Al-Ashi
- Cinematography: Ahmed Hassouna
- Edited by: Denis Le Paven
- Music by: Rasmus Steen
- Production companies: Coorigines Production; Masharawi Fund for Films & Filmmakers; Filcam Media For Media Production
- Release date: 5 September 2026 (Venice)
- Running time: 69 minutes
- Countries: Palestine; France
- Language: Palestinian Arabic

Citizen Osama (Arabic: المواطن أسامة, romanized: Al mowaten Osama) is a 2026 documentary film directed by Ahmed Hassouna. A co-production of Palestine and France, it follows the besieged lives of the Palestinian population during the ongoing Gaza war.

The film had its world premiere out of competition at the 83rd Venice International Film Festival on 5 September 2026. It was also selected as the Palestinian entry for the Best International Feature Film at the 99th Academy Awards.

== Premise ==
Osama was a professional artistic photographer until the beginning of the ongoing Gaza war, but now he struggles to provide for his wife and their infant amid hunger and wartime.

== Release ==
The film had its world premiere out of competition at the 83rd Venice International Film Festival on 5 September 2026.

In late August, Roger Waters, Annie Ernaux, Matteo Garrone, Jasmine Trinca, Saleh Bakri, Céline Sciamma, among many other industry talents, signed an open letter organized by the Venice4Palestine collective calling for the festival to take concrete action in support of Palestine, in the wake of the selection of two Palestinian films (Citizen Osama and Conversation with the Sea) about the ongoing conflict.

It was also selected as the Palestinian entry for the Best International Feature Film at the 99th Academy Awards.

== See also ==
- List of submissions to the 99th Academy Awards for Best International Feature Film
- List of Palestinian submissions for the Academy Award for Best International Feature Film
