= Mediterranean fever =

Mediterranean fever may refer to:

- Boutonneuse fever (also called Mediterranean spotted fever, fièvre boutonneuse, Kenya tick typhus, Marseilles fever or African tick-bite fever), a fever as a result of a Rickettsia infection caused by the bacterium Rickettsia conorii and transmitted by the dog tick Rhipicephalus sanguineus
- Brucellosis, a highly contagious zoonosis caused by ingestion of unpasteurized milk or undercooked meat from infected animals or close contact with their secretions
- Familial Mediterranean fever, a hereditary inflammatory disorder and an autoinflammatory disease caused by mutations in MEFV gene
- Mediterranean Fever (film), a 2022 film
