= Love Everlasting =

Love Everlasting may refer to:

- Love Everlasting (1913 film), a silent film directed by Mario Caserini
- Love Everlasting (2016 film), a film starring Lucky Blue Smith
- Love Everlasting (comic book), a comic series by Tom King and Elsa Charretier
