= Adam Bakri =

Palestinian actor

- آدم بكري
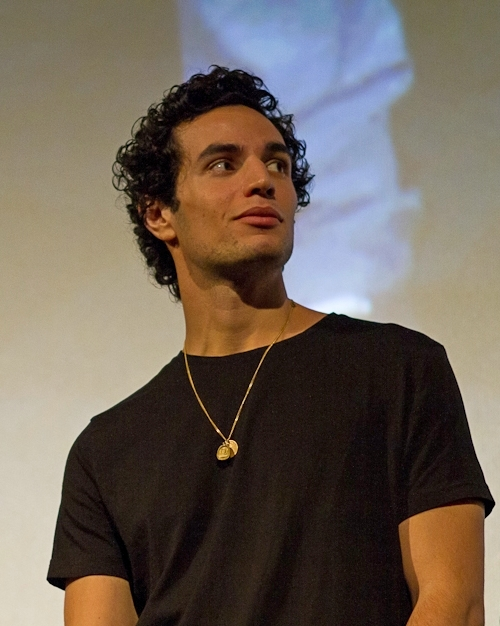
- Bakri in 2013
- Born: Jaffa, Israel
- Education: Lee Strasberg Theatre and Film Institute
- Occupation: Actor
- Years active: 2011–present
- Spouse: Cynthia Samuel (m. 2022)
- Father: Mohammad Bakri
- Relatives: Saleh Bakri (brother); Ziad Bakri (brother)

Adam Bakri (Arabic: آدم بكري) is a Palestinian actor. He made his feature film debut by starring in Oscar-nominated film Omar (2013), directed by Hany Abu-Assad.

== Early life and education ==
Adam Bakri was born in Jaffa to a Palestinian family and grew up in the village of Bi'ina. He is the son of actor and director Mohammad Bakri, with his brothers Saleh Bakri and Ziad Bakri also being actors.

After completing a bachelor's degree in English literature and Theater arts at Tel Aviv University, he trained at New York's Lee Strasberg Theatre and Film Institute.

== Career ==
Bakri began his acting career in theater at the age of 13, when he first took the stage performing in Ululation of the Land at the Al-Midan Theater in Haifa and Nazareth. Shortly after his graduation, he landed the lead role in Hany Abu-Assad's drama thriller Omar.

In 2014, he was cast as the male lead in Asif Kapadia's adaptation of Ali and Nino, the Azerbaijan's national novel placed during the first Azerbaijan Democratic Republic.

In 2018, Bakri played the male lead in an Australian feature film titled Slam, written and directed by Partho Sen-Gupta, shot in Sydney, Australia. In England, he joined the main cast of Gavin Hood's political thriller Official Secrets in the role of Katharine Gun's husband.

== Personal life ==
In September 2022, Bakri married Lebanese-Canadian model and actress Cynthia Samuel, having met while filming Hell's Gate. Their wedding took place in Cyprus.

== Filmography ==
Year	Title	Role	Director(s)	Notes
2012	Unfold	Elias Sohnoun	Ingrid Chikhaoui	Short film
2013	Omar	Omar	Hany Abu-Assad	
2014	A little bit of bad	Kenneth	Patrick von Barkenberg	Short film
2016	Ali and Nino	Ali Khan Shirvanshir	Asif Kapadia	
2018	Slam	Ricky Nasser	Partho Sen-Gupta	
2019	Official Secrets	Yasar Gun	Gavin Hood	
2019	Amsterdam to Anatolia	Marwan	Susan Youssef	Short film
2022	A Gaza Weekend	Waleed	Basil Khalil	
2024	If You See Something	Ali	Oday Rasheed	
2025	All That's Left of You	Sharif	Cherien Dabis	
2026	Sohab El Ard	Majd	Peter Mimi	miniseries

== Awards and nominations ==
Year	Organization	Award	Work	Result	Ref.
2013	Asia Pacific Screen Awards	Best Performance by an Actor	Omar	Nominated	
2014	Malmö Arab Film Festival	Best actor	Omar	Won	
2015	Chlotrudis Awards	Best actor	Omar	Nominated	
2018	Tallinn Black Nights Film Festival	Best actor	Slam	Nominated	
2019	Women Film Critics Circle	Best screen couple (shared with Keira Knightley)	Official Secrets	Nominated	
