= Eric Dupont =

Eric Dupont may refer to:

- Eric Dupont (producer), French film producer
- Éric Dupont (writer), Canadian novelist
- Éric Dupond-Moretti, French lawyer
