= Maisa Abd Elhadi =

Palestinian actress

- ميساء عبد الهادي
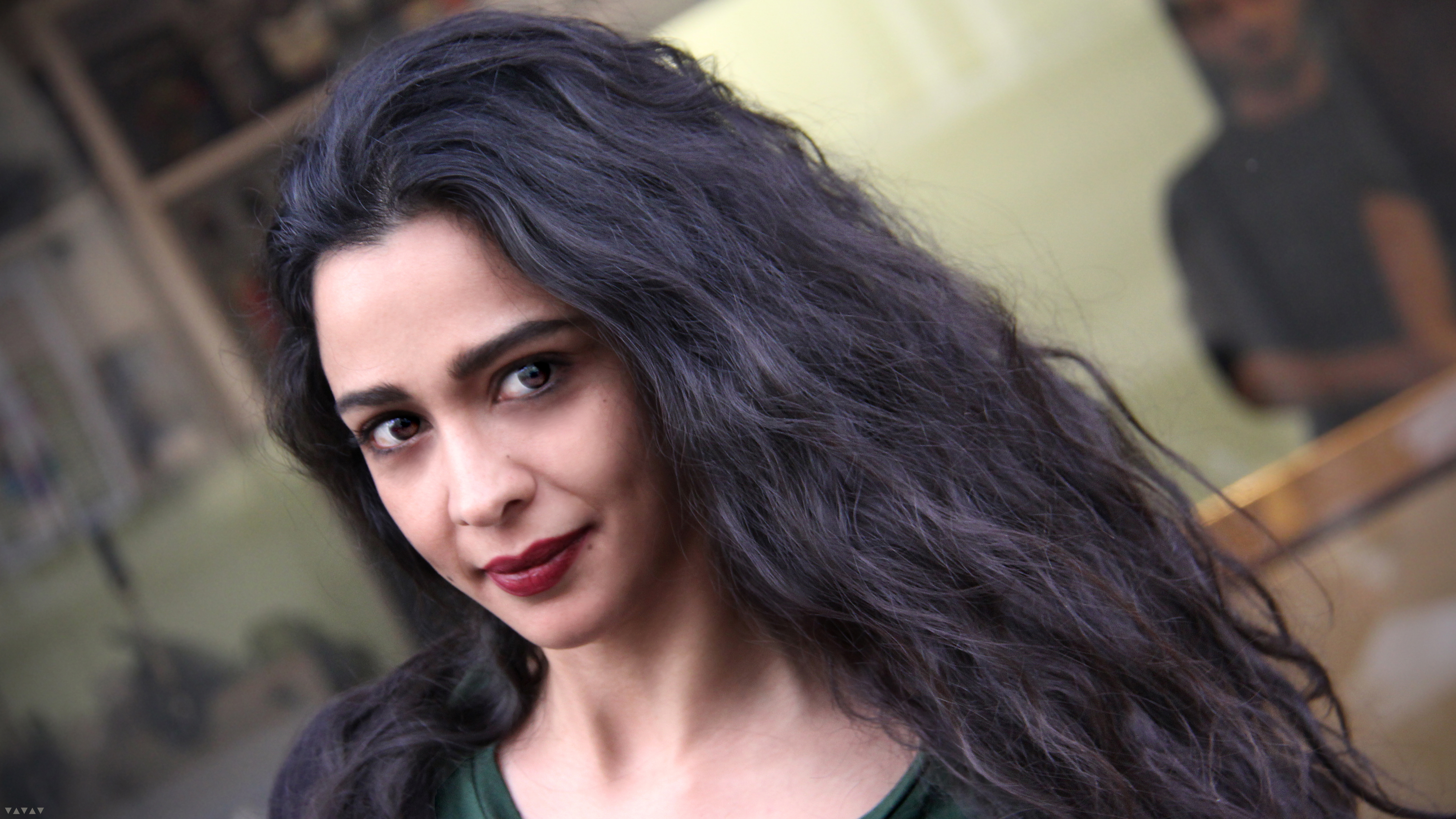
- Abd Elhadi in 2016
- Born: Nazareth, Israel
- Education: Academy of Performing Arts, Tel Aviv
- Occupation: Actress

Maisa Abd Elhadi (Arabic: ميساء عبد الهادي) is a Palestinian actress. She is known for her work in Arab and international cinema, including the 2015 international co-production 3000 Nights; the 2015 French film Dégradé (2015); and the 2016 Israeli drama film Personal Affairs. She has also starred in major British television productions for Channel 4, including the drama series The State (2017) and the 2020 crime thriller Baghdad Central.

== Early life and education ==
Maisa Abd Elhadi is from Nazareth, Israel.

She graduated from the Academy of Performing Arts in Tel Aviv.

== Career ==
=== Film ===
Abd Elhadi has become a prominent figure in Palestinian and international cinema. Her first credited film role was in Elia Suleiman's 2009 award-winning film The Time That Remains. In the following years she appeared in films like Sameh Zoabi's "Man Without a Cell Phone" (2010) and Susan Youssef'sHabibi Rasak Kharban (Darling, Something's Wrong with Your Head, 2011), for which she received the Best Actress Award at the Dubai International Film Festival and gained international recognition.

In 2015 she appeared in Hany Abu-Assad's The Idol, which was partially filmed in Gaza, the first feature film to be shot there in decades. In the same year she appeared Mai Masri's critically acclaimed 3000 Nights, taking on the lead role of Layal, one of a group of Palestinian women prisoners from the Occupied West Bank held captive by Israel on false charges. The film centers on her pregnancy and giving birth to a son while imprisoned. Her performance earned her Best Actress honours at the Dhaka International Film Festival.

In 2018 Abd Elhadi appeared in the award-winning and critically acclaimed films The Reports on Sarah and Saleem (an international co-production directed by Palestinian director Muayad Alayan) and the Israeli comedy drama Tel Aviv on Fire, the latter seeing her work again with director Sameh Zoabi.

In 2020 Abd Elhadi appeared in the romantic drama film Gaza mon amour, which premiered at the Venice Film Festival and received critical praise and several awards.

Abd Elhadi again worked with director Hany Abu-Assad in 2021, appearing in the lead role in the film Huda's Salon. A political thriller set in the Israeli occupied West Bank, it follows the story of young mother Reem, portrayed by Abd Elhadi, who falls victim to a collaborator of the Israelis who drugs women in hair-salons and undresses and photographs them to blackmail them for information to pass along to the Israelis. The story is based on real events. In 2021, Entertainment Weekly described Abd Elhadi's performance in Huda's Salon as a "master class" and included her performance among its "five must-see performances" at the Toronto International Film Festival, alongside leading international actors.

=== Television ===
Abd Elhadi appeared in the 2011 TV show Downtown Precinct and Sirens (2014). In 2017 she appeared in the British drama series The State, for Channel 4.

In 2020 she had a lead role in the Channel 4 miniseries Baghdad Central, directed by Alice Troughton. She plays the character of Zahra, an Iraqi translator who starts working with American occupation forces shortly after the 2003 invasion of Iraq because she needs the money. However after seeing how the Americans behave, she soon realises she has made a grave mistake, and joins the Iraqi resistance, using her access to the Americans and the Green Zone to their advantage.

=== Stage ===
Making her debut on the London stage in 2016, Abd Elhadi acted in the play Scenes From '68, appearing via Skype. Written by playwright Hannah Khalil, the play was performed in the Arcola Theatre and also featured veteran West End actor Peter Polycarpou.

== Recognition and awards ==
Abd Elhadi was named in four consecutive years among the "Golden 101" Most Influential Figures in Arab Cinema by the Arab Cinema Center (Cannes edition).

=== Awards ===
- Best Actress, Critics Awards for Arab Films, for Huda's Salon (2022)
- Best Actress, Almaty Film Festival – The Reports on Sarah & Saleem (2018)
- Best Actress, Durban International Film Festival – The Reports on Sarah & Saleem (2018)
- Best Actress, Dhaka International Film Festival – 3000 Nights (2016)
- Best Actress, Annaba Mediterranean Film Festival – 3000 Nights (2016)
- Best Actress (Ensemble), Annaba Film Festival – Degrade (2015)
- Best Actress, Dubai International Film Festival – Habibi Rasak Kharban (2011)

== Activism ==
Abd Elhadi was shot and injured in the leg by Israeli forces, while taking part in a civil protest in the city of Haifa, Israel, on 9 May 2021, protesting against forced expulsions of Palestinian families from their homes in the East Jerusalem neighbourhood of Sheikh Jarrah.

In a 2020 interview asking her what being part of the show Baghdad Central and portraying the character of Zahra meant to her, Abd Elhadi said:

Its very important for me – artists have a responsibility to tell the truth and fight propaganda. I'm Palestinian but I still have a responsibility to every nation who has gone through occupation. It's important to tell the story from the Iraqi point of view, to see them as human beings. I have to be honest to my character, the script and to Iraq.

On 12 October 2023, Abd Elhadi was arrested in Nazareth on charges of "inciting terrorism and expressing solidarity with a terrorist organization". At the police station, she was subjected to humiliating treatment by Israeli police, including photographing her handcuffed under an Israeli flag. Israeli media outlets published her private details, including her home address, along with a nude scene from her film Huda's Salon. Abd Elhadi described this as part of a coordinated smear campaign aimed at undermining her support among Palestinians. Israeli Interior Minister Moshe Arbel sought to revoke her Israeli citizenship and deport her. On 29 October, Nazareth District Court Judge Arafat Taha placed her under house arrest. While acknowledging that her posts were "harsh" and could provoke anger, the judge expressed uncertainty about whether she had committed any illegal acts by sharing them. According to the Adalah Center (Legal Center for Arab Minority Rights in Israel), Abdulhadi is one of 127 Palestinian women who were arrested or interrogated by Israeli police over social media posts between 7 October 2023 and 27 March 2024.

== Selected filmography ==
- The Time That Remains (2009)
- Eyes of a Thief (2014)
- 3000 Nights (2015)
- The Idol (2015)
- In Between (2016)
- The Worthy (2016)
- The Angel (2018)
- The Reports on Sarah and Saleem (2018)
- Tel Aviv on Fire (2018)
- Baghdad Central (2020)
- Gaza Mon Amour (2020)
- Huda's Salon (2021)
