= Reece Ritchie =

British actor (born 1986)

- Ritchie in 2024
- Born: 23 July 1986 (age 40); Lowestoft, Suffolk, England
- Occupation: Actor
- Years active: 2007–present
- Children: 1

Reece Ritchie (born 23 July 1986) is an English actor. He is known for his film roles, such as Moha in 10,000 BC (2008), Ray Singh in The Lovely Bones (2009), Bis in Prince of Persia: The Sands of Time (2010), and Iolaus in Hercules (2014). He starred as Jay in the British drama television series White Heat (2012). He played Zed in the American fantasy-adventure television series The Outpost (2019–2021) and stars as Lt. Spencer Lane in the American sci-fi television series The Ark (2023). He played Mr. Hale in the television series The New Librarians: the Next Chapter (2026)

== Early life ==
Ritchie was born in Lowestoft, Suffolk, England. He has described himself as a "mix", as his father is from Durban, South Africa and his mother is English. His paternal grandparents left South Africa for England when his father was only a year old because of apartheid in South Africa. Ritchie is the middle of three children. His younger sister is singer-songwriter Ria Ritchie. He worked with the National Youth Theatre as a teenager, and furthered his acting education at the East 15 Acting School at the University of Essex in Loughton, Essex.

== Career ==
After being spotted by a casting director during one of his monologue performances at the Soho Theatre in London, Ritchie was suggested for a role in director Roland Emmerich's 2008 epic 10,000 BC, in which he played the role of Moha. In Peter Jackson's 2009 film The Lovely Bones (based on Alice Sebold's novel of the same name), Ritchie played Ray Singh, the love interest of the main character, Susie Salmon.

In February and March 2010, he starred as Puck in A Midsummer Night's Dream at the Rose Theatre, Kingston with Judi Dench.

In 2013, it was announced that Ritchie would have a starring role in the 2015 television series Hieroglyph, to be produced by 20th Century Fox TV, but Fox dropped the production in June 2014. Ritchie has starred alongside Dwayne Johnson in the 2014 film Hercules. Ritchie played the role of Hercules' nephew Iolaus, a storyteller and soldier.

In 2023, Ritchie stars as Lt. Spencer Lane in the American sci-fi television series The Ark which airs on Syfy. The series premiered on February 1, 2023. Ritchie appears alongside co-stars Christie Burke and Richard Fleeshman.

== Filmography ==
=== Film ===
Year	Title	Role	Notes
2008	10,000 BC	Moha	
2009	Triage	Boy in Beirut	
2009	The Lovely Bones	Ray Singh	
2010	Prince of Persia: The Sands of Time	Bis	
2012	All in Good Time	Atul	
2014	Desert Dancer	Afshin Ghaffarian	
2014	Hercules	Iolaus	
2017	Lies We Tell	Nathan	
2021	Resurrection	Stephen	
2021	The Haunted Hotel	Charles Dickens	

=== Television ===
Year	Title	Role	Notes
2007	Saddam's Tribe: Bound by Blood	Older Ali	Television film
2007	The Bill	Duncan Wilde	Episode: "Up in Smoke"
2008	Silent Witness	Jake Burnett	2 episodes
2010	Pete versus Life	Ollie	4 episodes
2011	Atlantis	Yishharu	Television film
2012	White Heat	Jay	Main role
2014	Hieroglyph	Shai	Unaired television series
2015	A.D. The Bible Continues	Stephen	2 episodes
2017	Year Million	Oscar	Recurring role
2017	Rellik	Asim Fry	Recurring role
2018	Les Misérables	Fameuil	Episode #1.1
2019–2021	The Outpost	Zed	Recurring role (season 2); main role (seasons 3–4)
2020	Endeavour	Dr. Jeremy Kreitsek	Episode: "Oracle"
2020	Flack	Rick	Episode: "Sofi"
2023–present	The Ark	Lt. Spencer Lane/Ian	Main role
2025	Hostage	Dr. Noah Jacobs	2 episodes
