= From Ground Zero =

2024 anthology film by 22 Palestinian directors

- International release poster
- Directed by: Aws Al-Banna; Ahmed Al-Danf; Basil Al-Maqousi; Mustafa Al-Nabih; Muhammad Alshareef; Ala Ayob; Bashar Al Balbisi; Alaa Damo; Awad Hana; Ahmed Hassouna; Mustafa Kallab; Satoum Kareem; Mahdi Karera; Rabab Khamees; Khamees Masharawi; Wissam Moussa; Tamer Najm; Abu Hasna Nidaa; Damo Nidal; Mahmoud Reema; Etimad Weshah; Islam Al Zrieai
- Produced by: Rashid Masharawi; Laura Nikolov
- Edited by: Pauline Eon; Denis Le Paven
- Music by: Naseer Shamma
- Production companies: Masharawi Fund For Films & Filmmakers in Gaza; Coorigines Production; Metafora Production; Sharjah Art Foundation; International Media Support; Akka Films; The Royal Film Commission; Doha Film Institute
- Release date: July 5, 2024 (Amman)
- Running time: 113 minutes
- Countries: Palestine; France; Qatar; Jordan; United Arab Emirates
- Language: Palestinian Arabic
- Box office: $330,188

From Ground Zero (Arabic: قصص غير محكية من غزة من المسافة صفر, romanized: qiṣaṣ ghayr maḥkiyya min Ghazza min al-masāfa ṣifr, lit. 'Untold stories of Gaza's Ground Zero') is a 2024 anthology film directed by 22 different Palestinian directors. The film is made up of 22 short films, including documentaries, fiction, animation and experimental films about the current situation of the people of the Gaza Strip in the midst of the Gaza war.

From Ground Zero premiered at the 5th Amman International Film Festival on 5 July 2024 and had its North American premiere at the 49th Toronto International Film Festival on 9 September 2024 as part of the TIFF Docs section. It was selected as the Palestinian entry for the Best International Feature Film at the 97th Academy Awards, making the December shortlist, but was not nominated.

== Contents ==
- "Selfie", Directed by Reema Mahmoud
- "No Signal", Directed by Muhammad Alshareef
- "Sorry Cinema", Directed by Ahmed Hassouna
- "Flash Back", Directed by Islam Al Zrieai
- "Echo", Directed by Mustafa Kallab
- "Everything Is Fine", Directed by Nidal Damo
- "Soft Skin", Directed by Khamees Masharawi
- "Charm", Directed by Bashar Al-Balbeisi
- "The Teacher", Directed by Tamer Najm
- "A School Day", Directed by Ahmed Al-Danf
- "Overburden", Directed by Ala’a Ayob
- "Hell’s Heaven", Directed by Kareem Satoum
- "24 Hours", Directed by Alaa Damo
- "Jad and Natalie", Directed by Aws Al-Banna
- "Recycling", Directed by Rabab Khamees
- "Taxi Wanissa", Directed by E’temad Weshah
- "Offerings", Directed by Mustafa Al-Nabih
- "No", Directed by Hana Awad
- "Farah and Myriam", Directed by Wissam Moussa
- "Fragments", Directed by Basil Al-Maqousi
- "Out of Frame", Directed by Nidaa Abu Hasna
- "Awakening", Directed by Mahdi Karirah

== Development and production ==
After the start of the Gaza war, film director Rashid Masharawi founded the Masharawi Fund for Cinema and Filmmakers in Gaza with the purpose of supporting young Palestinian filmmakers to express themselves and tell their stories through cinema. Masharawi supported the production and post-production of the 22 short films that make up From Ground Zero filmed in different parts of the Gaza Strip at the end of 2023.

== Release ==
The film was scheduled to have its world premiere at the 77th Cannes Film Festival, but was pulled by organizers on "political grounds". In response, Masharawi held a screening via projection outside the festival grounds in protest. It had its official world premiere on July 5, 2024, at the 5th Amman International Film Festival, then screened in mid-July 2024 at the 70th Taormina Film Festival, on September 9, 2024, at the 49th Toronto International Film Festival and on September 28, 2024, at the 17th Toronto Palestine Film Festival.

=== Critical response ===
On the review aggregator website Rotten Tomatoes, 98% of 48 critics' reviews are positive, with an average rating of 8/10. The website's consensus reads: "An eclectic collection of short films that capture both the joy and pain of a people persevering through wartime, From Ground Zero has a cumulative emotional impact that proves unforgettable." Metacritic, which uses a weighted average, assigned the film a score of 83 out of 100, based on 13 critics, indicating "universal acclaim".

Matt Zoller Seitz of RogerEbert.com gave the film four out of four stars, praising it as a "staggering achievement" not just for being completed but also for expressing that "after a catastrophe, art is not only still possible but necessary". He stated that "We don't always understand the connections between people within individual stories and have to intuit them.... Rather than being confusing, this has a universalizing effect. We feel it could happen to us, too, or that it is happening to us, thanks to the empathy machine aspect of cinema storytelling." Seitz concluded that "Even amid so much murder and destruction, the urge to create abides. For all its horror and sadness, this is one of the most hopeful films I've ever seen." Seitz later named From Ground Zero as the best film of 2025.

== See also ==
- List of submissions to the 97th Academy Awards for Best International Feature Film
- List of Palestinian submissions for the Academy Award for Best International Feature Film
