= Ave Maria (2015 film) =

- Film poster
- Directed by: Basil Khalil
- Written by: Basil Khalil; Daniel Ka-Chun Chan
- Produced by: Eric Dupont; Eric Fantone
- Starring: Maria Zreik; Huda El-Imam; Shady Srour; Ruth Farhi; Maya Koren
- Cinematography: Eric Mizrahi
- Edited by: Basil Khalil
- Music by: Jamie Serafi
- Production company: Incognito Films
- Distributed by: Topic Studios (United States)
- Release date: May 18, 2015 (Cannes Film Festival)
- Running time: 14 minutes
- Countries: France, Germany, Palestine
- Languages: Arabic; English; Hebrew
- Box office: $559,502

Ave Maria is a short film directed by Basil Khalil and written by him and Daniel Ka-Chun Chan.

A family of religious Israeli settlers has their car break down in a rural area of the West Bank and they must seek the help of five nuns to get back home.

The movie was nominated for the Academy Award for Best Live Action Short Film at the 88th Academy Awards in 2016.

== Plot ==
The quiet routine of five Palestinian Carmelite nuns is abruptly disrupted when a Jewish settler family's car collides with a statue of the Virgin Mary in front of their house. They ring the doorbell to ask for help. At first, no one answers, as the sisters are bound by their vow of silence. When the youngest nun finally opens the door, she is horrified to discover that the statue of Mary has been beheaded in the accident. Distraught, she describes the tragedy to the other nuns, which proves difficult at first because of their vows. The settlers ask them to call for help by phone, but they are forbidden from operating any technical devices according to the laws of the Sabbath. They try to order a taxi, but the Arabs demand exorbitant prices because they are Jewish. Finally, the oldest nun suggests repairing an old car. The youngest proves to be a skilled mechanic. To avoid being shot by the Jews because of the Arab car, they place an oversized statue of the Virgin Mary on the roof and continue their journey.

== Criticism ==
Jennie Kermode of Eye for Film judges that the film never ridicules religious traditions, but merely "gently" displays the associated hypocrisies. Ave Maria thus contrasts with previous films that, with a direct focus on the conflict and tense social circumstances, attempted to solve problems. This film, instead, relies on humor and warmth.

== Cast ==
- Maria Zreik as Sr. Marie
- Huda Al Imam as Sr. Marie Angeline
- Shady Srour as Moshe
- Ruth Farhi as Esther
- Maya Koren as Rachel
- Sana Tanous as Sr. Marie Antoinette
- Maria De Pina as Sr. Marie Josephine
- Raneen Bisharat Iskandar as Sr. Marie of Christ Crucified

== Awards and nominations ==
Award	Date of ceremony	Category	Recipients and nominees	Result
Academy Awards	February 28, 2016	Best Live Action Short Film	Ave Maria	Nominated
