= Yuval Rozman =

Israeli actor, playwright, and director

- Born: 1984; Tel Aviv
- Occupation: Playwright

Yuval Rozman (Hebrew: יובל רוזמן; born 1984) is an Israeli actor, playwright, director, and theatre director, living in France.

== Youth and arrival to France ==
Rozman was born in 1984 in Tel Aviv into a left-wing religious Jewish family. He wrote his first play at the age of 18. Yuval Rozman trained at the Tel Aviv Conservatory. He deserted the Israeli army during his military service while deployed in Gaza. His 2010 play, Cabaret Voltaire, featuring Palestinian actor Mohammad Bakri, received numerous awards in Israel. He was opposed to Benjamin Netanyahu's policies and expressed this in his plays. In 2012, he decided to leave Israel for France.

== Career ==
His plays focus on the Israeli–Palestinian conflict and the issue of homosexuality, among other topics, but are not limited to these themes. In 2017 he presented Tunnel Boring Machine, a comedy exploring the journey of a Palestinian and an Israeli in the Gaza tunnels. On 26 November 2019 he visited the Valenciennes hospital center to read his texts and engage with patients.

In 2018 he directed HATE with Lætitia Dosch. In 2020, Yuval Rozman directed The Jewish Hour, a reflection on Jewish identity. The COVID-19 pandemic impacted the project, but he still won the Impatience Prize. Regarding this play, he stated, "It was in France that I discovered I was Jewish".

After the start of the Gaza war, a performance of The Jewish Hour was canceled following the 2023 Brussels shooting. Speaking about the war, Yuval Rozman said in the media: "On one hand, of course, condemn Hamas, terrorism, and all its horrors directed not against the Israeli people, but against Jews, and at the same time, acknowledge that there is a responsibility of the Israeli government, that there is still an occupation, Israeli war crimes". In 2023, he presented a new play, Ahouvi, about the romantic relationship between an Israeli woman and a Frenchman.

== Works ==
- 2005:Sous un ciel bleu et des nuages blancs
- 2010:Cabaret Voltaire
- 2015: Un Album
- 2017:Tunnel Boring Machine
- 2018: HATE
- 2021:The Jewish Hour
- 2023:Ahouvi
- 2025: Au Nom du Ciel
