= Personal Affairs (film) =

2016 Israeli drama film by Maha Haj

- Film poster
- עניינים אישיים
- Directed by: Maha Haj
- Written by: Maha Haj
- Release date: 12 May 2016 (Cannes)
- Running time: 90 minutes
- Country: Israel
- Languages: Arabic; Hebrew

Personal Affairs (Hebrew: עניינים אישיים, Arabic: Omor Shakhsiya) is a 2016 Israeli drama film, the directorial debut of Nazareth-born Palestinian Maha Haj. She was also the screenwriter for the film. Personal Affairs was screened in the Un Certain Regard section at the 2016 Cannes Film Festival.

== Plot ==
The members of a Palestinian family are dispersed between Israel, the occupied Palestinian territories, and Europe. The elderly parents live in Nazareth. The husband, Salah, keeps occupied with his laptop computer and does not interact with his wife, Nabila, who occupies her time with cooking, knitting and watching television soap operas. "She can barely bring herself to acknowledge her husband’s presence, much to his irritation. Nor can she muster much enthusiasm for joining him on a getaway to Sweden to visit their son Hisham".

In Ramallah, Samar, Nabila and Salah's pregnant daughter, cares for Granny, whose dotage is punctuated by brief moments of reflection. Meanwhile, Samar's husband, George, a mechanic, finds himself cast in an American movie after visiting filmmakers turn up at his garage. The opportunity affords him permission to go to Haifa — where he sees the Mediterranean for the first time.

Another son, Hisham, has relocated to Stockholm, putting himself at an even greater remove from his family and origins. He pressures Tariq, his brother, to visit their parents and convince them to take a trip to Sweden to see him. Tariq states that he moved to Ramallah to get away from the parents and their unhappiness, but agrees to a short visit. Back in Ramallah, Samar is critical of his unwillingness to marry and settle down.

"Between check-points and dreams, frivolity and politics, some want to leave, others want to stay but all have personal affairs to resolve."

== Cast ==
- Amer Hlehel as George
- Doraid Liddawi as Tareq
- Zidane Awad as Saeed
- Mahmoud Shawahdeh as Salah
- Saana Shawahdeh as Nabila
- Maisa Abd Elhadi as Maisa
- Hanan Hillo as Samar
- Ziad Bakri as Hisham
- Jihan Dermelkonian as the grandmother

== Awards and nominations ==
- October 2016: Haifa International Film Festival: the Haifa Cultural Fund Award for Best Feature Film (the festival's top prize), award of NIS 100,000
- October 2016: 38th Cinemed Film Festival in Montpellier: BNP Paribas Critics' Prize, award of 2,000 Euro
- October 2016: Philadelphia Film Festival: the Archie Award for Best First Feature
