= Wajib (film) =

2017 Palestinian drama film

- Film poster
- Directed by: Annemarie Jacir
- Written by: Ossama Bawardi Annemarie Jacir
- Produced by: Ossama Bawardi
- Starring: Mohammad Bakri, Saleh Bakri, Maria Zreik
- Cinematography: Michael Zananiri
- Edited by: Sanabel Cherqaoui
- Music by: Koo Abouali
- Production companies: Ape&Bjørn, Ciudad Lunar Producciones, JBA Production
- Release date: 5 August 2017 (Locarno)
- Running time: 96 minutes
- Country: Palestine
- Language: Palestinian Arabic

Wajib (Arabic: واجب Wājib, "Duty") is a 2017 Palestinian drama film directed as well as written by Annemarie Jacir. It was screened in the Contemporary World Cinema section at the 2017 Toronto International Film Festival. It was selected as the Palestinian entry for the Best Foreign Language Film at the 90th Academy Awards, but it was not nominated.

Wajib won 36 international awards including Best Film in Mar Del Plata, Dubai, Amiens, DC Film Festival, Kerala and the London BFI Festival.

== Plot ==
In this road movie, a father and son travel amid wedding preparations in the lead-up to Christmas in Nazareth.

== Cast ==
- Mohammad Bakri as Abu Shadi
- Saleh Bakri as Shadi
- Maria Zreik as Amal
- Ossama Bawardi as Karaim
- Tarik Kopty as Abu Murad
- Lama Matour as Maria
- Monera Shehadeh as Um Murad
- Zuhaira Sabbagh as Georgette
- Samia Shahan as Widow
- Jalil Abu Hanna as Waiter
- Emil Rock as Bird's uncle
- Naheda Azzam Shorrosh as Bird's aunt
- Sobhi Hosari as Salim
- Ruba Blal as Rami's wife
- Huda Al Imam as Um Issa
- Blanche Mawaari as Um Rami
- Rana Allaudin as Fadyah's cousin
- Eihab Salame as Norbert
- Samia Hakim as Woman in Salon
- George Kheleifi as Asad
- Shams Bawardi as Rami's daughter
- Bahjat Odeh as Mourner
- Salah Taha as Shadir Seller
- Mohamed Jabarin as Nasser
- Rebecca Esmeralda Telhami as Noura
- Sama Dubayah as Running Girl
- Reem Khoury as Saleswoman
- Raja Dubayah as Neighbor (voice)
- Violette Khoury as Grandmother
- Manner Bakri as Johnney
- Makram Khoury as Special Appearance
- Amina Bawardi as Relative
- Falah Zoabi as Marwan
- Rezik Bawardi as Abu Firas
- Sana Mgazil as Um Suleman
- Gaby Abu Sini as Abu Issa
- Ebah Bahous as Yousef
- Karma Zoubi as Salwa
- Maryam Konj as Souq Girl
- Mahmoud More as Driver 1
- Khalil Khalileh as Driver 2
- Dana Abed as Reiham
- Nader Bawaridi as Kayak Seller
- Henry Andrawes as Rami
- Ahmed Bayatra as Salesman
- Walaa Eltiti
- Yazeed Fariuja
- Hanna Jiryis

== Reception ==
=== Critical reception ===
On review aggregator Rotten Tomatoes, the film holds an approval rating of 100%, based on 34 reviews with an average rating of 7.6/10.

=== Awards ===
- Muhr Awards for Best Fiction Feature Film and for Best Actor (for Mohammad Bakri and Saleh Bakri), Dubai International Film Festival 2017
- Golden Crow Pheasant for Best Film, International Film Festival of Kerala 2017
- Arab Critics Awards for Best Film, Best Screenplay and Best Actor (for Mohammad Bakri), Cannes Film Festival 2018
- Golden Astor for Best Film and Silver Astor for Best Actor (for Mohammad Bakri) Mar del Plata International Film Festival 2017

== See also ==
- List of submissions to the 90th Academy Awards for Best Foreign Language Film
- List of Palestinian submissions for the Academy Award for Best Foreign Language Film
