= Haifa (film) =

1996 film

- Directed by: Rashid Masharawi
- Written by: Rashid Masharawi
- Produced by: Erik Schut; Peter van Vogelpoel
- Starring: Mohammad Bakri
- Cinematography: Ehab Assal; Edwin Verstegen
- Edited by: Hadara Oren
- Release date: 8 August 1996
- Running time: 75 minutes
- Country: Palestine
- Language: Arabic

Haifa is a 1996 Palestinian drama film directed by Rashid Masharawi. It was screened in the Un Certain Regard section at the 1996 Cannes Film Festival.

== Cast ==
- Mohammad Bakri - Haifa
- Ahmad Abu Sal'oum - Abu Said
- Hiam Abbass - Oum Said (as Hiyam Abbass)
- Nawal Zaqout - Sabah
- Fadi El-Ghoul - Siad
- Areen Omari - Samira
- Khaled Awad - Abbas (as Khalid Awad)
- George Ibrahim (actor) - Postman
- Mariam El-Hin - Haifa's aunt
- Mahmoud Qadah - Said
- Hussam Abu Eisheh - Barber
- Samer Abu Eisheh - Son of the barber
- Younis Younis - Younis
