= A Gaza Weekend =

2022 British film by Basil Khalil

- Promotional poster
- Directed by: Basil Khalil
- Written by: Basil Khalil; Daniel Ka-Chun Chan
- Produced by: Amina Dasmal
- Starring: Stephen Mangan; Mouna Hawa; Loai Nofi; Maria Zreik; Adam Bakri; Adeeb Safadi
- Cinematography: Eric Raphael Mizrahi; Lasse Ulvedal Tolbøll
- Edited by: Shahnaz Duleimy; Victoria Boydell
- Music by: Alex Baranowski
- Production companies: Alcove Entertainment; BFI; Film4
- Release date: 10 September 2022 (TIFF)
- Running time: 90 minutes
- Countries: United Kingdom; Palestine
- Languages: English; Arabic; Hebrew

A Gaza Weekend is a 2022 British-Palestinian comedy film co-written and directed by Basil Khalil. It follows an English man named Michael (Stephen Mangan) and his Israeli partner Keren (Mouna Hawa) as they try to take refuge in Gaza, which—due to Israel's blockade of the region—has ironically become the safest place to be after a virus is accidentally released from an Israeli laboratory.

== Synopsis ==
An accident at the Institute for Microbiological Research in Israel leads to a mutant viral outbreak known as ARS. Englishman Michael (Stephen Mangan) and his Israeli girlfriend Keren (Mouna Hawa) become stranded in the Gaza strip after their plan to flee Israel fails. Waheed (Adam Bakri), a local trader, shelters the couple with his family. Once news of the couple is reported by the media, Michael and Keren must begin another escape plan.

== Production ==
Although the film revolves around a viral pandemic, it began production long before the COVID-19 pandemic – according to director Basil Khalil, it began as a conversation in 2009. It was written by Khalil and Daniel Ka-Chun Chan, and produced by Amina Dasmal and Alcove Entertainment. Eric Raphael Mizrahi and Lasse Ulvedal Tolbøll were the cinematographers, and Victoria Boydell and Shahnaz Dulaimy edited the film.

The film premiered on 10 September 2022 at the Toronto International Film Festival, where it won the FIPRESCI Prize.

== Reception ==
On the review aggregator website Rotten Tomatoes, 80% of 10 critics' reviews are positive, with an average rating of 7.2/10. A review of the film by Toronto's Allan Hunter described Gaza Weekend as "an entertaining, endearingly old-fashioned comedy," praising the political commentary but noting the film fell short of being "the uproarious heart-warmer it seems to promise."
