= Ahmed Hassouna =

Palestinian filmmaker

- أحمد حسونة
- Born: Saudi Arabia
- Occupation: Film director

Ahmed Hassouna (Arabic: أحمد حسونة; born in Saudi Arabia) is a Palestinian film director, cinematographer and journalist. His 2026 documentary Citizen Osama was selected as Palestine's submission in the Best International Feature Film category at the 99th Academy Awards.

== Early life ==
Hassouna was born in Saudi Arabia and was raised in the Gaza Strip. He studied journalism at Al-Azhar University in Gaza City before moving into documentary and, later, fiction filmmaking.

== Career ==
Hassouna's 2019 feature film debut, Istrupya, concerned four youths debating emigrating from Gaza. He contributed his short film Sorry, Cinema to the 2024 Rashid Masharawi-helmed anthology film From Ground Zero, which depicted life during the Gaza war.

In 2026, Hassouna's documentary Citizen Osama about a Palestinian journalist premiered out of competition at the 83rd Venice International Film Festival.

== Filmography ==
Year	Title	Notes	Ref.
2019	Istrupya		
2024	From Ground Zero	Sorry, Cinema segment	
2026	Citizen Osama		

== Awards and nominations ==
Year	Award	Category	Nominated work	Result	Ref.
2019	Alexandria Mediterranean Film Festival	Special Jury Award	Istrupya	Won	
