= Arafat, My Brother =

2005 French documentary film

- Directed by: Rashid Masharawi
- Release date: 2005
- Country: Palestine

Arafat, my brother (French: Arafat, mon frère) is a 2005 French documentary directed by Palestinian Rashid Masharawi, portraiting the Palestinian physician and Yasser Arafat's brother, Fathi Arafat, to get answers about the future of Palestine.

== Overview ==
Rashid Masharawi tried to interview the leader of the Palestine Liberation Organization Yasir Arafat for getting answers about the Palestinian's fate. However, he wasn't able to enter Ramallah, and Yasser Arafat wasn't allowed to leave the city.

Rashid Masharawi knew Arafat's brother Fathi Arafat, who was the head of the Palestinian Red Crescent Society and was dealing with cancer. Masharawi filmed and interviewed Fathi Arafat for almost one year on a journey from El Cairo to Paris to answer the questions What is the Palestinian peoples’ hope for a future? What will happen to us next?
