= Eyes of a Thief =

2014 Palestinian film

- Film poster
- Directed by: Najwa Najjar
- Written by: Najwa Najjar
- Starring: Khaled Abol Naga
- Release dates: 27 September 2014 (Brazil); 1 October 2014 (Palestine)
- Running time: 98 minutes
- Country: Palestine
- Language: Arabic

Eyes of a Thief (Arabic: عيون الحرامية, romanized: ʿuyūn al-ḥarāmiyya) is a 2014 Palestinian drama film directed by Najwa Najjar. It is Najjar's second feature film, and is based in part on an incident that took place in Silwad in 2002. It was selected as the Palestinian entry for the Best Foreign Language Film at the 87th Academy Awards, but was not nominated. The film is set in the West Bank. Its world premiere took place at the Ramallah Cultural Palace in Ramallah, Palestine.Best Director won at Kolkata International Film Festival, 2014.

== Cast ==
- Khaled Abol Naga as Tarek Khedr
- Souad Massi as Lila
- Nisreen Faour as Duniya
- Maisa Abd Elhadi as Houda (as Maisa Abdel Hadi)
- Areen Omari as Salwa

== See also ==
- List of submissions to the 87th Academy Awards for Best Foreign Language Film
- List of Palestinian submissions for the Academy Award for Best Foreign Language Film
- List of Palestinian films
