= Ruth Farchi =

Israeli actress (1927–2021)

- רות פרחי
- As Ms. Pepperney - Screenshot from "Kupa Rashit"
- Born: Ruth Zimmer; 13 August 1927; Vienna, Austria
- Died: 19 April 2021 (aged 93)
- Occupation: Actress

Ruth Farchi (or Farhi) born as Ruth Zimmer (Hebrew: רות פרחי; 13 August 1927 – 19 April 2021) was an Austrian-born Israeli TV, stage and film actress.

== Life ==
Zimmer was born in Vienna, Austria, and she emigrated to Mandatory Palestine with her parents in 1934. She became as a teacher. During Israel's War of Independence, she served in the Haganah. She married in 1951 and had three children. From 1968 she took acting lessons, studying at Kibbutzim College's School of Performing Arts, and from 1972 she started performing in the theatre.

Apart from the theatre she has worked on 40 television and film productions, including Schindler's List (1993), What's the 48? (2011), The Farewell Party (2014), My Michael, Get Through the Wall, Sima Vaknin, a Witch and the short film Ave Maria (2015). That movie was nominated for the Academy Award for Best Live Action Short Film at the 88th Academy Awards in 2016. Two of the films she was in were presented at the Cannes Film Festival in 1997 and 2000. On television, she played roles in the series Kofiko, Traffic Light, All Bash, and her last role, Ms. Pepperney, in Kupa Rashit.

Farchi last lived in Ramat Gan. Farchi died on 19 April 2021, aged 93, and is buried in the Zichron Yaacov cemetery.
