= Palestine Stereo =

2013 film

- Directed by: Rashid Masharawi
- Written by: Rashid Masharawi
- Starring: Mahmud Abu-Jazi
- Cinematography: Tarek Ben Abdallah
- Release date: 6 September 2013 (TIFF)
- Running time: 90 minutes
- Country: Palestine
- Language: Arabic

Palestine Stereo (Arabic: فلسطين ستيريو) is a 2013 Palestinian drama film written and directed by Rashid Masharawi. It was screened in the Contemporary World Cinema section at the 2013 Toronto International Film Festival.

== Cast ==
- Mahmud Abu-Jazi
- Salah Hannoun
- Assem Zoubi
