= All in Good Time (film) =

- Directed by: Nigel Cole
- Written by: Ayub Khan-Din; Bill Naughton
- Starring: Reece Ritchie; Amara Karan; Harish Patel; Meera Syal
- Music by: Niraj Chag
- Production company: Left Bank Pictures
- Distributed by: StudioCanal
- Release date: 11 May 2012
- Running time: 93 min.
- Country: United Kingdom
- Language: English

All in Good Time is a British film directed by Nigel Cole and starring Reece Ritchie, Amara Karan, Harish Patel, and Meera Syal. It is based on Ayub Khan-Din's 2007 play Rafta, Rafta, which was based on Bill Naughton's 1963 play All in Good Time and the 1966 film adaptation The Family Way.

== Synopsis ==
Atul (Reece Ritchie) and Vina (Amara Karan) are newly married and in love. But their marriage gets off to a slow start because they are living with Atul's parents in Bolton. Lack of privacy in the cramped household and Atul's overbearing father, Eeshwar (played by Harish Patel), prevent Atul and Vina to find a suitable time and place to consummate their marriage. At time goes by, word gets around and the young couple's relationship begins to fray. After Vina leaves Atul, Eeshwar is finally able to talk to Atul without judgment and tells him to bring Vina home. With the relationship repaired, Atul and Vina are finally able to consummate their marriage.

== Reception ==
The review aggregator website Rotten Tomatoes reported a 62% approval rating with an average rating of 5.2/10 based on 21 reviews.

In a 2012 Guardian review it was stated, "All in Good Time is a touching, likable comedy of life in Lancashire's Hindu community."
