= The Ark (TV series) =

American television series

- Genre: Science fiction; Mystery; Drama
- Created by: Dean Devlin
- Starring: Christie Burke; Reece Ritchie; Richard Fleeshman; Stacey Michelle Read; Ryan Adams; Pavle Jerinić; Shalini Peiris; Christina Wolfe; Tiana Upcheva
- Country of origin: United States
- Original language: English
- No. of seasons: 3
- No. of episodes: 36

Production
- Executive producers: Dean Devlin; Jonathan Glassner; Marc Roskin; Rachel Olschan-Wilson; Steve Lee
- Producers: Jonathan English; Steve Lee; Mark Franco
- Production locations: PFI Studios, Belgrade, Serbia
- Production companies: Electric Entertainment; Balkanic Media; PFI Studios

Original release
- Network: Syfy
- Release: February 1, 2023 – present

The Ark is an American science fiction television series created by Dean Devlin for Syfy, with Devlin and Jonathan Glassner serving as showrunners for the series. The first season consists of twelve episodes and premiered on February 1, 2023. The series stars Christie Burke as Lt. Sharon Garnet who becomes the de facto captain of an interstellar spacecraft after a disaster. It also stars Reece Ritchie, Richard Fleeshman, Stacey Michelle Read, Ryan Adams, Pavle Jerinić, Shalini Peiris, Christina Wolfe, and Tiana Upcheva.

In April 2023, the series was renewed for a second season consisting of twelve episodes, which premiered on July 17, 2024. In March 2025, the series was renewed for a third season, which premiered on July 29, 2026.

== Premise ==
A hundred years in the future, a vast spacecraft known as Ark One is shuttling a complement of would-be colonists away from a devastated Earth to a new home, Proxima Centauri B. The ship suffers a catastrophic event that kills almost all of the technical crew and all of the ship's senior officers. The survivors must work to reorganize themselves to maintain the ship and stay on course to reach their destination.

== Cast and characters ==
=== Main ===
- Christie Burke as Lt. Sharon Garnet, one of the three remaining junior officers, who assumes the role of the de facto captain of the ship after the disaster
- Reece Ritchie as Lt. Spencer Lane (seasons 1–2), one of the three remaining junior officers who is suspicious of Garnet's leadership
  - Ritchie also portrays Ian (season 2–present), a clone and Spencer's brother
- Richard Fleeshman as Lt. James Brice, one of the three remaining junior officers and a self-proclaimed "navigation wonk" who now has to take on other duties after the disaster
- Stacey Read as Alicia Nevins, a waste management engineer with coding skills who is promoted to chief of life support
- Ryan Adams as Angus Medford, a farm and 4-H youth from horticulture whose duties include crop development at the prospective colony
- Pavle Jerinić as Felix Strickland, acting head of security enforcement
- Shalini Peiris as Dr. Sanjivni Kabir, the only remaining doctor on the medical staff
- Christina Wolfe as Dr. Catrina "Cat" Brandice (seasons 1–2), (Note: Wolfe was credited as main in season 2, episode 1 and as guest starring in season 2, episode 4.) a social media star and "TV relationship specialist" whom Garnet orders to be the head of ship-wide mental health
- Tiana Upcheva as Eva Markovic, acting head of maintenance, engineering, and construction

=== Recurring ===
- Lisa Brenner as Lieutenant Commander Susan Ingram (season 1), a career military officer who would have been the superior officer to the surviving crew
- Miles Barrow as Baylor Trent (season 1), an ensign and Ingram's protégé
- Dominik Čičak as Harris Beckner (season 1), a member of Eva's engineering team and her secret lover
- Chris Leask as Jasper Dades (season 1), a crew member with a secret
- Tamara Radovanovic as Jelena Griff, a member of Ark 1's security team, later medical staff
- Milos Cvetkovic as Sasha Novak, an Ark 1 engineer
- Jelena Moore as Stella Cogner (season 1), an Ark 1 survivor
- Jessica Yemi as Naomi Spencer, an Ark 1 survivor
- Paul Murray as William Trust, the inventor of the Ark program
- Mercedes De La Cruz as Helena Trust (season 1), William's wife
- Samantha Glassner as Kelly Fowler, an Ark 3 survivor and Evelyn Maddox's daughter
- Jelena Stupljanin as Evelyn Maddox (seasons 1–2), the commander of Ark 15
- Jadran Malkovich as Dr. Marsh (season 2–present; guest season 1), Maddox's former chief of medical who defected to Ark 1 after disagreements with her
- Díana Bermudez as Kimi Joma (season 2–present), Maddox's former chief of security who defected to Ark 1
- Coral Mizarachi as Lati Meir (season 2–present), an Ark 15 defector
- Daniel Fathers as Captain Zed Avega (season 2–present), the captain of the Eastern Federation ship encountered by Ark 1
- Tamara Aleksic as Vesna Ilic (season 3; guest season 2), the governor of Homebase 1
- Ana Savija as Dr. Olga 'Doc' Morozov (season 3) a medic on Ark 1
- Toni Gojanovic as Sheriff Milan Petrovic (season 3), the new sheriff of Homebase 1
- Aaron Fontaine as Admiral Ben Hammond (season 3), a Ross 128 settlement survivor who joins Ark 1

== Episodes ==
Season	Episodes	Originally released	
Season	Episodes	First released	Last released
1	12	February 1, 2023	April 19, 2023
2	12	July 17, 2024	October 2, 2024
3	12	July 29, 2026	October 14, 2026

=== Season 1 (2023) ===
No. overall	No. in season	Title	Directed by	Written by	Original release date	U.S. viewers
1	1	"Everyone Wanted to Be on This Ship"	Dean Devlin	Dean Devlin	February 1, 2023	578,000
When an accident causes the crew of the Ark to wake up prematurely and with most of the senior staff dead, the remaining crew must establish a leadership committee from the remaining survivors and find a way to get the mission back on track.
2	2	"Like It Touched the Sun"	Milan Todorović	Jonathan Glassner	February 8, 2023	408,000
A murder leaves the crew divided and suspicions running rampant.
3	3	"Get Out and Push"	Milan Todorović	John-Paul Nickel	February 15, 2023	310,000
An engine malfunction puts the ship at risk of an approaching comet, but the comet may provide an opportunity to deal with the imminent water shortage.
4	4	"We Weren't Supposed to Be Awake"	Sandra Mitrović	Rebecca Rosenberg	February 22, 2023	350,000
While Garnet is arrested for murder, the crew start to experience hallucinations that may lead to death if they don't find a treatment.
5	5	"One Step Forward, Two Steps Back"	Sandra Mitrović	Kendall Lampkin	March 1, 2023	340,000
Garnet's secret is exposed and the true identity of the murderer is revealed as the ship faces a potential engine overload.
6	6	"Two by Two"	Milan Todorović	Jonathan Glassner	March 8, 2023	361,000
A fuel shortage forces the Ark to attempt a risky manoeuvre to reach a planet to refuel, while certain secrets come out among the crew.
7	7	"A Slow Death Is Worse"	Milan Todorović	John-Paul Nickel	March 15, 2023	426,000
The discovery of Ark 3 leaves the crew facing difficult revelations about life on Earth after their departure.
8	8	"Every Single Person Matters"	Orsi Nagypal	Kendall Lampkin	March 22, 2023	403,000
The reawakening of William Trust raises new tensions among the Ark crew.
9	9	"The Painful Way"	Orsi Nagypal	John-Paul Nickel	March 29, 2023	339,000
Trust and his associates rally a mutiny when Garnet makes a controversial decision.
10	10	"Hoping for Forever"	Sandra Mitrović	Jonathan Glassner	April 5, 2023	357,000
Kelly's true agenda is revealed when she takes crew hostage just as Ark 15 mounts an attack.
11	11	"The Last Thing You Ever Do"	Milan Todorović	Rebecca Rosenberg	April 12, 2023	437,000
With key personnel captured on Ark 15, Garnet mounts a risky rescue operation.
12	12	"Everybody Wins"	Jonathan Glassner	John-Paul Nickel	April 19, 2023	463,000
Garnet attempts risky negotiations with Ark 15 to find a deal that all parties can be satisfied with, but Proxima B turns out to have an unfortunate secret that nobody anticipated.

=== Season 2 (2024) ===
No. overall	No. in season	Title	Directed by	Written by	Original release date	U.S. viewers
13	1	"Failed Experiment"	Marc Roskin	Jonathan Glassner	July 17, 2024	240,000
With Ark 1 damaged after the destruction of Proxima B, the bridge crew must work with Ark 15 to gain access to the rest of the ship.
14	2	"Kill or Be Killed"	Milan Todorović	John-Paul Nickel and Jonathan Glassner	July 24, 2024	N/A
Garnet works to integrate the former Ark 15 residents into the crew of Ark 1, which includes putting Kelly on trial for her previous actions.
15	3	"Anomaly"	Milan Todorović	John-Paul Nickel and Jonathan Glassner	July 31, 2024	N/A
The ship is attacked by an energy-based life-form.
16	4	"The Other You"	Milan Todorović	Madeline Hendricks Lewen	August 7, 2024	N/A
An accident with the FTL drive results in Brice being transported to an alternate universe where his other self died in a military operation over a decade ago. Meanwhile, the alternate version of Cat- still alive and married to William Trust- is transported to the 'prime' Ark.
17	5	"Museum of Death"	Sandra Mitrović	India Sage Wilson	August 14, 2024	285,000
Returning to Ark-3 to strip it for spare parts, the crew discover an unexpected survivor on board.
18	6	"Pretty Big Deal"	Milan Konjević	John-Paul Nickel	August 21, 2024	N/A
As the crew complete repairs to Ark-1, they detect a distress call from Ark-8 and set out to investigate the crashed ship.
19	7	"It Can't Be True"	Milena Grujić	Madeline Hendricks Lewen	August 28, 2024	282,000
Investigations into the destruction of Ark-8 reveal potential Eastern Front traitors in the crew.
20	8	"We Don't Kill Our Own"	Marc Roskin	India Sage Wilson	September 4, 2024	N/A
The Ark-8 survivors stage a mutiny to take control of the ship, forcing various Ark-1 crew to try and retake control.
21	9	"Cycle of Violence"	Hannah Espia-Farbová	James DeLorean	September 11, 2024	239,000
Contact with an Eastern Federation ship leaves Ark-1 in a tense situation as both parties try to negotiate peace, culminating in a serious loss.
22	10	"It Should Have Been You"	Sandra Mitrović	Madeline Hendricks Lewen	September 18, 2024	N/A
An accident with the FTL drive traps Garnet and Ian in a shared coma fantasy, years passing by for them as hours go by in the real world.
23	11	"It Will Be Over Soon"	Orsi Nagypál	India Sage Wilson	September 25, 2024	201,000
As Ark-1 finally reaches the Trappist system, Strickland is contacted by an unknown party threatening the life of his daughter to make him commit subtle acts of sabotage.
24	12	"Fortunate"	Jonathan Glassner	John-Paul Nickel	October 2, 2024	281,000
As Ark-1 reaches humanity's new home, the ship faces a new threat by an old enemy.

=== Season 3 (2026) ===
No. overall	No. in season	Title	Directed by	Written by	Original release date	U.S. viewers
25	1	"I Told You Not to Come"	Marc Roskin	Jonathan Glassner	July 29, 2026	N/A
Ark-1 begins its mission to help and rescue people. Arriving at Ross 128b, they rescue Admiral Hammond, but lose 2 people.
26	2	"It Won't Hurt Too Much"	Sandra Mitrović	John-Paul Nickel	August 5, 2026	N/A
Ark-1 has a problem when Admiral Hammond wants to be in command, but he soon realizes things are different. The ship goes to investigate a possible location to pursue Evelyn Maddow, finding instead an Ark full of clones.
27	3	"The One"	Sandra Mitrović	Madeline Hendricks Lewen	August 12, 2026	N/A
Mutiny happens at Ark-1 when Admiral Hammond does not want to rescue Garnet and Ian from the found Ark, but Kimi does. After the rescue, arriving at Homebase 1, Garnet confronts Kabir about the latter knowing of her being a Gen-3 clone that does not go mad.
28	4	"Hiding in Plain Sight"	Milan Todorović	India Sage Wilson	August 19, 2026	N/A
Brice manages to send a distress message from Ross. Hammond discovers that Ves belonged to something called Black Thorn, and she kills him.
29	5	"It All Happened So Fast"	Orsi Nagypal	James DeLorean	August 26, 2026	N/A
30	6	"Deja Vu"	Sandra Mitrović	Jonathan Glassner	September 2, 2026	N/A
31	7	"I Have Nightmares"	Igor Šunter	John-Paul Nickel	September 9, 2026	N/A
32	8	"By Any Means Necessary"	Milena Grujić	Madeline Hendricks Lewen	September 16, 2026	N/A
33	9	"Critical Failure"	Milan Todorović	India Sage Wilson	September 23, 2026	N/A
34	10	"The Lucky Ones"	Milena Grujić	James DeLorean	September 30, 2026	N/A
35	11	"A Pretty Nasty One"	Orsi Nagypal	Jonathan Glassner	October 7, 2026	N/A
36	12	"We Can't Save Everyone"	Jonathan Glassner	John-Paul Nickel	October 14, 2026	N/A

== Production ==
The Ark received a straight-to-series order in late January 2022 with a 12-episode order from Syfy. Principal photography began at PFI Studios in Belgrade, Serbia, in March of that year. Dean Devlin and Jonathan Glassner serve as showrunners and producers.

In March 2022, it was announced that the regular cast of the series had been set, with Christie Burke starring as Lt. Sharon Garnet, along with Richard Fleeshman, Reece Ritchie, Stacey Read, and newcomer Ryan Adams. In April 2022, it was announced that Lisa Brenner would be a recurring guest star, playing Commander Susan Ingram, with Christina Wolfe, Shalini Peiris, Miles Barrow, Pavle Jerinić, and Tiana Upcheva also recurring.

On April 12, 2023, Syfy renewed the series for a second season. On March 5, 2025, Syfy renewed the series for a third season.

== Release ==
The series premiered on Syfy on February 1, 2023, with episodes released the next day on Peacock.

The second season premiered on July 17, 2024. The third season premiered on July 29, 2026.

== Reception ==
The review aggregator Rotten Tomatoes reported a 50% approval rating based on 14 critic reviews. The website's critics consensus reads, "The core concept of The Ark ought to be alluring enough for the sci-fi faithful, but blasé writing and chintzy production values call into question whether this particular world is worth preserving." Metacritic assigned a score of 50 out of 100 based on 9 critics, indicating "mixed or average reviews".
