= Christina Wolfe =

English actress (Born September 8, 1990)

- Born: 8 September 1990 (age 35); London, U.K.
- Occupation: Actress
- Years active: 2010–present

Christina Wolfe (born 1990), credited earlier in her career as Christina Ulfsparre, is an English actress. She voiced and portrayed Robyn in the 2015 video game Need for Speed and played the recurring roles of Kathryn Davis in the television series The Royals and Julia Pennyworth in The CW television series Batwoman. She portrayed Kate in 2022 Netflix film The Weekend Away. In 2023, she starred as Cat Brandice in the Syfy science-fiction television series The Ark.

== Early life and education ==
Born in London on 8 September 1990, Wolfe attended Durham University and studied English and Philosophy. She also trained at Drama Studio London.

== Career ==
Wolfe played Kathryn Davis on The Royals, which ran for three seasons on E! Her character was involved with princes Liam and Robert. The series ended on a cliffhanger, with Wolfe's character being kidnapped and pregnant with Liam's baby.

She next appeared on The CW series Batwoman as Julia Pennyworth, the daughter of Alfred Pennyworth.

Wolfe appears in the 2022 Netflix film The Weekend Away in a prominent role. Wolfe plays Kate, a woman who convinces her best friend Beth (Leighton Meester) to travel to Croatia for a weekend getaway. However, when Kate goes missing, Beth is forced to figure out what happened to her. The film was released on Netflix on 3 March 2022.

== Filmography ==
=== Film ===
Year	Title	Role	Notes
2014	Sleeping Beauty	Annabelle	Credited as Christina Ulfsparre
2014	Hercules Reborn	Princess Theodora	Credited as Christina Ulfsparre
2014	Fury	Pretty Girl on Bike	Uncredited
2014	From A to B	Julie	Credited as Christina Ulfsparre
2016	Angel of Decay	Carol DaRonch	
2016	Level Up	Kya	
2018	Tin Holiday	Kelly	Credited as Christina Ulfsparre
2022	The Weekend Away	Kate	Streaming film

=== Television ===
Year	Title	Role	Notes
2010	Doctor Mateo	Inga	3 episodes
2014	West End Girls	Sarah Jayne	TV movie; credited as Christina Ulfsparre
2015	Drowning in Sunshine	Vera	Miniseries; credited as Christina Ulfsparre
2015	Serial Thriller: Angel of Decay	Carol	Episode: "Angel of Decay Part 2"
2015	Playhouse Presents	Miss Endway	Episode: "King for a Term"
2016	Holby City	Astrid Taylor	Episode: "From Bournemouth with Love"
2016–2018	The Royals	Kathryn Davis	Recurring role (seasons 2–3), 17 episodes
2019	Very Valentine	Rosaria	TV movie
2019–2021	Batwoman	Julia Pennyworth	Recurring role (seasons 1–2)
2023–2024	The Ark	Cat Brandice	Main role
2024–2025	FBI: International	Amanda Tate	Main role (season 3–4)

=== Video games ===
- Need for Speed (2015), as Robyn (voice and live-action cutscenes)
