= The Weekend Away =

2022 film by Kim Farrant

- Release poster
- Directed by: Kim Farrant
- Screenplay by: Sarah Alderson
- Based on: The Weekend Away by Sarah Alderson
- Produced by: Erica Steinberg; Charlie Morrison; Ben Pugh
- Starring: Leighton Meester; Christina Wolfe; Ziad Bakri; Luke Norris; Amar Bukvić; Iva Mihalić; Adrian Pezdirc; Parth Thakerar
- Cinematography: Noah Greenberg
- Edited by: Sophie Corra
- Music by: Daniel Wohl
- Production company: 42
- Distributed by: Netflix
- Release date: March 3, 2022
- Running time: 89 minutes
- Country: United States
- Language: English

The Weekend Away is a 2022 American thriller film directed by Kim Farrant from a screenplay by Sarah Alderson, based on Alderson's 2020 novel of the same name. It follows a woman named Beth (Leighton Meester), who travels to Croatia for a weekend getaway with her best friend Kate. However, Kate suddenly goes missing and Beth is forced to figure out what happened to her. The film was released on Netflix on March 3, 2022.

Between February 27 and March 20, 2022, the film was watched for 79.95 million hours, according to Netflix's top 10s.

== Plot ==
London-based American new mother Beth flies to Croatia for a holiday with her best friend Kate. Beth confides that her marriage has hit a dull patch and that she is uncertain what to do. They go clubbing and two men flirt with them. Kate suggests Beth have a one-night stand. The next morning, Beth wakes up foggy about the night's events and realizes Kate is missing. Her husband Rob and the police are indifferent, but Zain, the taxi driver who drove them to the club, agrees to help. Beth recovers Kate's purse and phone after Zain threatens one of the men from the previous evening, and learns that the men from the club were escorts hired by Kate. However, they are also con men who drug and rob the women they service.

Beth returns to the police, who start an official investigation. Rob arrives in Croatia and immediately suspects Zain. Shortly after, Kate's body is found. Beth searches Kate's phone for clues and finds text messages between Rob and Kate revealing an extramarital affair. Beth is called into the police station as the primary suspect. It is revealed that both Kate and Beth had drugs in their systems, as Beth suspected due to her memory loss, and she insists she was drugged. The police interview the escorts, who have no criminal history and deny any wrongdoing. The police confiscate Beth's passport. Beth calls Rob and confronts him about the affair.

The police accuse Beth of hiring Zain to murder Kate. Beth confronts him, but he maintains his innocence. Beth discovers her Airbnb host, Sebastian, records his renters. Footage shows Beth was put in bed early the night Kate went missing. It shows Kate getting robbed by the escorts, entering a taxi to follow them and returning later in another car. Beth discovers the car belongs to Pavić, the policeman who doubted her story. Beth and Zain interview the taxi driver who drove Kate that night. He said Kate had him follow the two men, and he dropped her off at the police station. Beth is named a suspected murderer and she and Zain are arrested. Beth figures out that Pavić was involved in Kate's disappearance. Zain gives himself up so Beth can escape, but she is caught by Pavić. They struggle and he falls off the building to his death. The police believe that Pavić killed Kate when she rejected his advances, and Beth is declared innocent.

Back in London, Rob wants to reconcile, but Beth refuses. While looking for her car keys, she finds beads from a necklace she gave Kate in Rob's coat pocket. She realizes Rob killed Kate and confronts him while on the line with the police. He admits he flew to Croatia to stop Kate from revealing their affair, argued with her and pushed her into the water before running off. The police arrest him and Beth leaves with her baby.

== Cast ==
- Leighton Meester as Beth
- Christina Wolfe as Kate
- Ziad Bakri as Zain
- Luke Norris as Rob
- Amar Bukvić as Pavić
- Iva Mihalić as Kovač
- Adrian Pezdirc as Sebastian
- Marko Braić as Luka
- Lujo Kunčević as Mateo
- Parth Thakerar as Jay

== Production ==
The Weekend Away was filmed in Split, Croatia, and the statue of Croatia's national poet, Marko Marulić, at the Radić Brothers Square is shown during a pivotal scene.

== Reception ==
On the review aggregator website Rotten Tomatoes, 39% of 28 critics' reviews are positive, with an average rating of 4.9/10. The website's consensus reads: "The Weekend Away makes for a painless enough home viewing experience, but Leighton Meester's performance deserved a better film."

Dennis Harvey of Variety said, "For all its increasingly-expansive credibility gaps and other flaws, however, the movie does provide a slick, pacey diversion." Marya E. Gates of RogerEbert.com said the film, "is the best kind of purposely preposterous potboiler. The scenery is gorgeous, the twists keep the adrenaline pumping, and the performances are memorable. Even though you might not remember everything that happens, you'll have a good time while it lasts."

In Croatia, the film was met with poor reviews. Writing for Jutarnji list, the film critic Jurica Pavičić dubbed the film "hopelessly stripped of talent". Izabela Pepelko Farszky of 24sata mocked the inaccuracies and illogicalities regarding the way the city of Split is depicted in the film.
