= Huda's Salon =

- Directed by: Hany Abu-Assad
- Written by: Hany Abu-Assad
- Produced by: Hany Abu-Assad; Mohamed Hefzy; Amira Diab
- Starring: Ali Suliman; Samer Bisharat; Maisa Abd Elhadi; Manal Awad
- Cinematography: Peter Flickenberg; Ehab Assal
- Edited by: Eyas Salman
- Production companies: H&A Production; Film Clinic; Films
- Release date: September 9, 2021 (TIFF)
- Running time: 91 minutes
- Country: Palestine
- Language: Arabic
- Box office: $16,128

Huda's Salon is a 2021 Palestinian internationally co-produced thriller film written, directed, and produced by Hany Abu-Assad. It stars Ali Suliman, Samer Bisharat, Maisa Abd Elhadi and Manal Awad.

It had its world premiere at the 2021 Toronto International Film Festival in September 2021.

== Cast ==
- Ali Suliman as Hasan
- Samer Bisharat as Said
- Maisa Abd Elhadi as Reem
- Manal Awad as Huda

== Production ==
In February 2020, it was announced Ali Suliman and Maisa Abd Elhadi had joined the cast of the film, with Hany Abu-Assad directing from a screenplay he wrote.

Principal photography was suspended on 20 March 2020, due to the COVID-19 pandemic, and resumed on 15 July 2020. Production on the film was suspended again, with production concluding by December 2020.

== Release ==
Huda's Salon had its world premiere at the 2021 Toronto International Film Festival in September 2021. Prior to, IFC Films acquired U.S. distribution rights to the film.
