= All That's Left of You =

2025 film

- International promotional poster
- Arabic: اللي باقي منك
- Directed by: Cherien Dabis
- Written by: Cherien Dabis
- Produced by: Thanassis Karathanos; Cherien Dabis; Martin Hampel; Karim Amer
- Starring: Saleh Bakri; Cherien Dabis; Mohammad Bakri; Adam Bakri; Maria Zreik; Muhammad Abed Elrahman; Sanad Alkabareti; Salah El Din
- Cinematography: Christopher Aoun
- Edited by: Tina Baz
- Music by: Amine Bouhafa
- Production companies: Pallas Film; Displaced Pictures; Nooraluna Productions; Twenty Twenty Vision; AMP Filmworks; ZDF; Arte
- Distributed by: X Verleih AG (through Warner Bros. Pictures) (Germany)
- Release dates: 25 January 2025 (Sundance); 20 November 2025 (Germany)
- Running time: 146 minutes
- Countries: Germany; Cyprus; Palestine; Jordan; Greece; Qatar; Saudi Arabia
- Languages: Arabic; English
- Box office: $1 million

All That's Left of You (Arabic: اللي باقي منك, romanized: Illī Bāqī Minnak) is a 2025 drama film produced, written and directed by Cherien Dabis, who also stars in it alongside Saleh Bakri, Mohammad Bakri, Adam Bakri, Maria Zreik, Muhammad Abed Elrahman, Sanad Alkabareti and Salah El Din. It follows a Palestinian family across three generations during the time spanning from the 1948 days of Nakba to the 2020s under Israeli occupation.

The film had its world premiere at the 2025 Sundance Film Festival on 25 January 2025. It was selected as the Jordanian entry for the Best International Feature Film at the 98th Academy Awards, making the December shortlist.

== Plot ==
In 1948 Jaffa, Sharif lives with his family amidst Israeli bombardment. Steadfast on protecting his ancestral home, Sharif makes the decision to move his family to Nablus while he remains to negotiate with the approaching Israeli forces. However, he is violently expelled from his land by soldiers and placed in a prison camp where he labours for months until suffering a heart attack, after which he is allowed to reunite with his family.

Thirty years later, a now-widowed Sharif celebrates the wedding of his youngest daughter, who is soon to join her older sister in Toronto; Sharif's eldest son has also relocated to Amman. Sharif resides in the West Bank with his youngest son, Salim, Salim's pregnant wife, Hanan, and the couple's two young children. One day, Salim takes his eldest son, Noor, to collect medicine for Sharif, who experiences heart problems caused by his heart attack, but the pair is stopped and aggressively taunted by Israeli soldiers imposing an impromptu curfew; Salim is forced at gunpoint to degrade both himself and Hanan in front of Noor. The incident radicalises Noor, who resents Salim's cowardice while growing closer to Sharif and his patriotism.

Ten years later, Sharif has died, and a teenage Noor roams the streets due to school closure. He encounters and joins a protest but is shot in the head when Israeli soldiers open fire on the crowd. Hanan and Salim transfer Noor to a hospital in Haifa to receive adequate care but, due to the couple struggling to retrieve permits in time, Noor fails to recover and is declared brain dead. Hanan and Salim grapple with the question of organ donation, conflicted by the prospect of Noor's organs going to a donee who might grow up to harm their people. After ruminating on the advice of a sheikh and the memory of Salim's mother dying from a lack of a kidney donor, Hanan and Salim agree to donate Noor's organs, saving the lives of six children. Noor's body is returned to the West Bank and a funeral is held. Later, Hanan and Salim travel to Tirat Carmel to visit Ari, the donee of Noor's heart and the only surviving Israeli donee. Ari is visibly apprehensive of the couple and does not speak.

Thirty-four years later, Hanan and Salim, now residing in Toronto, visit Jaffa, now a part of Tel Aviv. Hanan reunites with an adult Ari and recounts her family's history to him. Ari seems dismissive of Noor's story but reassures Hanan that he did not join the army, due to health issues. Before leaving, Hanan implores Ari to never forget that Noor “had a good heart”. Afterwards, Hanan urges a hesitant Salim to explore the city and revisit his childhood neighbourhood, where they find Salim's dilapidated ancestral home. As they watch the sun set over the sea, Salim teaches Hanan a poem that Sharif would recite to him seventy-four years prior.

"أنا بَحْرٌ في أَحشائِهِ الدُّرُّ كامِنٌ،
فَهَل سَأَلوا الغَوّاصَ عَن صَدَفاتي

(I am the sea. In my depths, all treasures dwell.
Have they asked the divers about my pearls?)"

— Hafez Ibrahim

== Cast ==
- Saleh Bakri as Salim
- Salah El Din as Young Salim
- Cherien Dabis as Hanan
- Adam Bakri as Sharif
- Mohammad Bakri as Older Sharif
- Maria Zreik as Munira
- Muhammad Abed Elrahman as Teenage Noor
- Sanad Alkabareti as Young Noor

== Production ==
Initially set to commence production in Palestine, the Gaza war forced the crew to evacuate two weeks before the scheduled start date, and production was instead relocated to Cyprus, Greece and Jordan. In November 2024, it was announced Dabis, Saleh Bakri, Adam Bakri, Mohammad Bakri, Maria Zreik, and Muhammad Abed Elrahman had joined the cast. In September 2025, following the film's festival run, Mark Ruffalo and Javier Bardem were announced to have joined the film as executive producers.

== Release ==
It had its world premiere at the 2025 Sundance Film Festival on 25 January 2025. It also screened in the Official Competition at the 2025 Sydney Film Festival in June, where it won the Audience Award for Best International Feature, and later screened at the 8th Malaysia International Film Festival in the Competition section on 25 July 2025. In August 2025, Watermelon Pictures acquired US distribution rights to the film, co-distributing with Visibility Films.

In the United States, the film will have an Academy Awards-qualifying theatrical run in Los Angeles on 28 November 2025, followed by a limited theatrical release in select cities on 9 January 2026, with nationwide expansions in subsequent weeks.

It is one of three films on Palestinian history to be submitted to the 98th Academy Awards for Best International Feature Film – the others being Palestine 36 and The Voice of Hind Rajab.

The film will compete in the Awards Buzz – Best International Feature Film section of the 37th Palm Springs International Film Festival on 5 January 2026.

== Reception ==
=== Critical response ===
On the review aggregator website Rotten Tomatoes, 100% of 65 critics' reviews are positive, with an average rating of 8.1/10. The website's consensus reads: "A moving chronicle of generational trauma and perseverance, All That's Left of You is a riveting drama that takes on the thematic breadth of an epic work." Metacritic, which uses a weighted average, assigned the film a score of 78 out of 100, based on 14 critics, indicating "generally favorable" reviews.

Sandra Hall of The Age gave the film a score of 4/5 stars, saying, "Dabis' screenplay is episodic but it gathers power as it goes. She doesn't believe in shorthand. Nor does she hold back in portraying the tragic consequences of the Palestinians' expulsion from their homes." Robert Daniels of RogerEbert.com gave it 4/4 stars, calling it "the kind of accomplished, immaculately rendered film that's indicative of a director who's learned much and is ready to seize more." The New York Times's Lisa Kennedy wrote, "In depicting scenes of dispossession and fraught encounters with soldiers, the filmmaker offers a saga of trauma that has antecedents in dramas set during previous mass conflicts like Apartheid as well as in the Jim Crow South."

=== Accolades ===
The film won the Audience Award at the 2025 Leiden International Film Festival in the Netherlands, and was also named best film at the 8th Malaysia International Film Festival.

Award	Ceremony date	Category	Recipient(s)	Result	Ref.
Red Sea International Film Festival	13 December 2025	Silver Yusr Feature Film	All That's Left of You	Won	
Film Independent Spirit Awards	15 February 2026	Best International Film	Cherien Dabis	Nominated	

== See also ==
- List of submissions to the 98th Academy Awards for Best International Feature Film
- List of Jordanian submissions for the Academy Award for Best International Feature Film
