= Eric Dupont (producer) =

French producer for Incognito films

- Occupation: Film producer
- Employer: Incognito Films
- Known for: Ave Maria

Eric Dupont is a French producer for Incognito films, best known for producing the short-film Ave Maria, which earned him a nomination for the Academy Award for Best Live Action Short Film at the 88th Academy Awards.

== Filmography ==
- Ave Maria
- The Old Man Who Read Love Stories
