= Saleh Bakri =

Palestinian actor (born 1977)

- صالح بكري
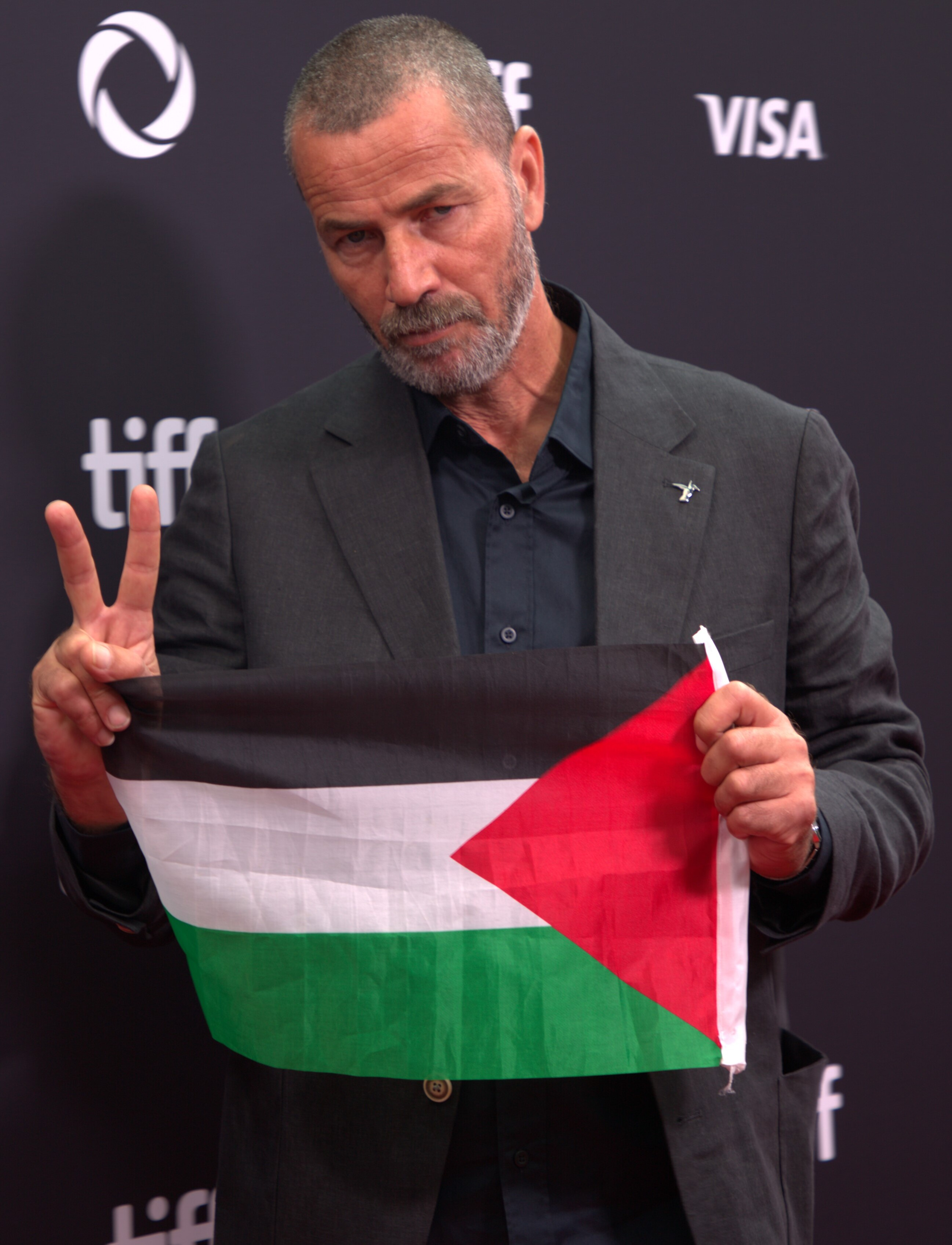
- Saleh Bakri at the 2025 Toronto International Film Festival
- Born: March 1, 1977 (age 49); Jaffa, Israel
- Occupation: Actor
- Years active: 2007–present
- Father: Mohammad Bakri
- Relatives: Adam Bakri (brother); Ziad Bakri (brother)

Saleh Bakri (Arabic: صالح بكري, Hebrew: סאלח בכרי; born 1977) is a Palestinian actor. He began his career in the theater. He is the son of actor and film director Mohammad Bakri, and the brother of actors Ziad, Adam Bakri and Mahmood Bakri.

== Career ==
Bakri performed in Death and the Maiden directed by Juliano Mer-Khamis.

In 2007, Bakri appeared in his first two films: The Band's Visit, and Salt of this Sea by Annemarie Jacir, which premiered at Cannes in 2008. Salt of this Sea was Bakri's debut performance in an Arab film and went on to be Palestine's official submission for the Academy Awards. The Band's Visit also won numerous prizes and awards, including the Ophir Award for Best Supporting Actor and the Most Promising Actor award at the Jerusalem Film Festival for Bakri. The following year he portrayed Elia Suleiman's father Fouad in The Time That Remains.

In 2011, Bakri appeared in Radu Mihaileanu's film The Source alongside Leïla Bekhti, Hafsia Herzi, Biyouna, Sabrina Ouazani, and Hiam Abbass.

Bakri was the protagonist of Sharif Waked's work To be continued in 2009, portraying a Palestinian martyr who reads what was supposed to be the text that testifies to his approaching obliteration but emerges instead as tales from A Thousand and One Nights. Other projects include Laila's Birthday by Rashid Masharawi, playing a supporting role next to his father, Annemarie Jacir's second film When I Saw You, and a short movie titled Fireworks directed by Italian director Giacomo Abbruzzese. He played the eponymous protagonist in the Italian thriller Salvo, which won the Critics' Week Grand Prize at the 2013 Cannes Film Festival. In 2015 Bakri appeared at the Royal Court Theatre in the play Fireworks by Palestinian playwright Dalia Taha, about two families living under siege in Gaza. In 2019 Bakri starred in Dialogue with the Unseen by Italian artist Valerio Rocco Orlando, a video installation about individuals who are questioning their own relationship with nature and society.

In 2021 Bakri's film The Present was nominated for the Academy Award for Best Live Action Short Film.

In 2022, Bakri played the protagonist in The Blue Caftan, directed by Maryam Touzani.

== Filmography ==
Year	Title	Role	Director	Notes
2007	The Band's Visit	Khaled	Eran Kolirin	
2008	Salt of this Sea	Emad	Annemarie Jacir	
2008	Laila's Birthday	Prisoner	Rashid Masharawi	
2009	The Time That Remains	Fuad	Elia Suleiman	
2011	The Source	Sami	Radu Mihăileanu	
2011	Fireworks	Saleh	Giacomo Abbruzzese	Short film
2012	When I Saw You	Layth	Annemarie Jacir	
2013	Salvo	Salvo Mancuso	Fabio Grassadonia and Antonio Piazza	
2013	Giraffada	Yacine	Rani Massalha	
2015	Rattle the Cage	Talal	Majid Al Ansari	
2017	Wajib	Shadi	Annemarie Jacir	
2017	Bonboné		Rakan Mayasi	Short film
2018	The Tower	Yehia	Mats Grorud	Animated film
2019	My Zoe	Akil	Julie Delpy	
2019	Dialogue with the Unseen		Valerio Rocco Orlando	
2020	The Present	Yusef	Farah Nabulsi	Short film
2021	Costa Brava, Lebanon	Walid	Mounia Akl	
2021	Grasshoppers	Nijm	Brad Bischoff	
2022	The Blue Caftan	Halim	Maryam Touzani	
2023	The Teacher	Basem	Farah Nabulsi	
2025	All That's Left of You	Salim	Cherien Dabis	
2025	Palestine 36	Khalid	Annemarie Jacir	
