= The Olive Harvest =

2003 film

The Olive Harvest (Arabic: موسم الزيتون, romanized: mawsim az-zaytūni) is a 2003 Palestinian film directed by Hanna Elias. It won the "Best Arab film" award for 2003 at the Cairo International Film Festival, and it was Palestine's submission to the 77th Academy Awards for the Academy Award for Best Foreign Language Film, but was not accepted as a nominee.

== See also ==
- List of submissions to the 77th Academy Awards for Best Foreign Language Film
- List of Palestinian submissions for the Academy Award for Best Foreign Language Film
