= 3000 Nights =

2015 film

- Film poster
- Directed by: Mai Masri
- Written by: Mai Masri
- Starring: Maisa Abd Elhadi
- Edited by: Michèle Tyan
- Distributed by: Cinema Politica (Canada)
- Release date: 12 September 2015 (TIFF)
- Countries: Palestine; France; Jordan; Lebanon
- Languages: Arabic; Hebrew

3000 Nights is a 2015 internationally co-produced drama film written and directed by Mai Masri. It was screened in the Contemporary World Cinema section of the 2015 Toronto International Film Festival. The film focuses on a Palestinian woman, who gives birth to a son while in jail on false charges. It was selected as the Jordanian entry for the Best Foreign Language Film at the 89th Academy Awards but it was not nominated.

== Plot ==
Layal is a young schoolteacher who lives with her husband, Farid in the occupied West Bank town of Nablus, Palestine. They are preparing to leave for Canada in search of a new life when Layal is arrested and falsely accused of helping a teenage boy suspected of attacking a military checkpoint. When she refuses to testify against the boy in court, Layal is charged with being an accomplice and sentenced to 8 years in prison despite the staunch defense put up by her human rights defense lawyer.

Layal is transferred to a high-security Israeli women's prison where she encounters a terrifying world in which Palestinian political prisoners are incarcerated with Israeli criminal inmates. After witnessing a fierce confrontation between the two sides and being attacked by a female drug addict, Layal discovers that she is pregnant. Her husband does not want her to have their child in prison and tells her that he is leaving for Canada. The prison director, Ruti pressures Layal to abort the baby and spy on the Palestinian inmates. Traumatized and betrayed, Layal hits rock bottom but with the support of the women around her, she finds the strength to stand up for herself and fight to have her child.

Layal goes into labour and is taken in chains to a military hospital where she gives birth to a baby boy she names Nour. As she struggles to raise her son behind bars, she manages to find a sense of hope and a meaning to her life. At the infirmary in the men's section of the penitentiary, she meets Ayman, an imprisoned Palestinian doctor who helps her cope and find love again.

Prison conditions deteriorate and the Palestinian women decide to launch a major hunger strike. Ruti warns Layal against joining the strike and threatens to take Nour away. Rihan, a Palestinian inmate who is secretly working with the prison authorities, urges Layal to collaborate with Ruti. Layal is terrified of losing her son but in a moment of truth overcomes her fear and joins the strike. The guards are sent in to take Nour from her by force. Layal barricades herself with the women inside their cells. Armed soldiers in gas masks storm the prison and subdue the women with clubs and tear gas. Ayman and the male prisoners join the rebellion. The news hits the headlines. The women succeed in realizing their demands and several prisoners are released but Layal is not among them. She is condemned to serve her full prison term. She must find the strength to fight for herself, her child, and the day they will be reunited.

== Cast ==
- Maisa Abd Elhadi as Layal
- Nadira Omran as Sana
- Abeer Zeibak Hadad as Hava
- Raida Adon as Shulamit
- Yussuf Abu-Warda as Judge
- Anahid Fayad as Rihan
- Haifa Al-Agha as Im Ali
- Rakeen Saad as Jamila
- Hana Chamoun as Fidaa
- Khitam Edelbi as Ze'eva
- Karim Saleh as Ayman

== Reception ==
The film received generally positive reviews, with the Middle East Eye calling it "is an unforgettable human portrait of a group of Palestinian women in Israel’s Ramla prison in the 1980s." In the London Film Festival, the film received a positive reception, with many in the audience in tears.

== See also ==
- List of submissions to the 89th Academy Awards for Best Foreign Language Film
- List of Jordanian submissions for the Academy Award for Best Foreign Language Film
- List of Palestinian films
