= Love Everlasting (2016 film) =

- Directed by: Rob Diamond
- Produced by: Dallon Smith, Michael Andrew, Rob Diamond
- Starring: Lucky Blue Smith, Emily Procter, Christie Burke
- Cinematography: Lars Lindstrom
- Edited by: Sam Bauer, Lars Lindstrom
- Music by: Josh Debney
- Release date: 15 November 2016
- Running time: 93 minutes
- Country: United States
- Language: English

Love Everlasting is a 2016 American teen romance film starring Lucky Blue Smith, directed by Rob Diamond.

== Plot ==
High school senior Bridger and his mother Helen Jenkins flee an abusive step-father and husband in Missouri with $197 to their names, and flee towards the West Coast, hoping to see the ocean. Unfortunately, they end up in the small town of Greenville, Utah when their truck breaks down. Local mechanic Will Simms, sympathetic to their situation, gives them temporary lodging. Will's daughter Clover is very shy, and secretly a cutter, haunted by a past incident that left a scar on her left cheek. Earlier, she was in a different crowd, and one night due to her friends being drunk, they mishandled a gun and shot Clover. Bridger also has a scar on his chest, from a childhood heart transplant. They both stand up for each other from the school bully Bo Chinsley. Bo and another football player were the two involved in Clover's accident, with the other person sympathetic to her, but Bo furious when her testimony lands him in trouble. Both face apathy and inaction from the school authorities, though the school's wood-shop teacher takes a liking to Bridger, trying to protect him when he can. However, Bridger is unable to retaliate due to his heart condition - any strenuous activity could cause his heart to fail.

Despite Bo and his gang tormenting the two, they make it to the end of school and both graduate, as a couple. On the night of the graduation Bo corners Bridger in a restroom and after Bridger finally responds by punching Bridger in the face, Bo's two accomplices hold him down while Bo beats him repeatedly, including to his chest which puts him in cardiac arrest. Bo is interrupted by the wood-shop teacher who has been tipped off about the planned beating and an ambulance is called. As Bridger is loaded unconscious into an ambulance Bo is arrested and taken away in a police cruiser.

At the hospital Bridger is shown to be in a coma while Clover reads poetry out loud to him. He comes round and completes the last line of a stanza she has just started and asks her to marry him. She agrees and the two hug. While Bridger's mom is overjoyed, Clover's dad is worried that she will get hurt due to Bridger's medical condition, but she convinces him that their love is enough. They get married in a private ceremony before completing Bridger's dream to see the Pacific Ocean from California. The morning after they consummate their marriage, however, Bridger's heart sadly gives out and Clover finds him on the beach, leaving her and their parents heartbroken.

A closing scene shows Clover happily pushing hers and Bridger's child on a swing.

== Cast ==
- Lucky Blue Smith as Bridger
- Emily Procter as Helen
- Christie Burke as Clover
- Shawn Stevens as Will
- Austin R. Grant as Bo
- Landon Henneman as Roman
- Garet Allen as Albert

== Production ==
The movie was partly filmed in Utah, where Smith grew up, and takes advantage of the scenic beauty of the area. Smith is best known as a model and the film was his acting debut. His father, Dallon Smith, was one of the three producers of the film.

It premiered at the Vista Theatre in Los Angeles on November 9, 2016, and had a limited theatrical release in Utah theaters on February 10, 2017.

The movie received mixed reviews, with The Salt Lake Tribune calling it a "a nicely acted but predictably tragic young-adult romance." It was also described as a mix of The Fault in Our Stars and Romeo and Juliet. It also received numerous nominations for the 2017 Utah Film Awards, and Shawn Stevens won for Feature Supporting Actor.

The film is unrated, but the director predicts it would have received a PG or PG-13 rating in the United States.
