= Najwa Najjar =

Palestinian film director and screenwriter

Najwa Najjar (Arabic: نجوى نجار) is a film writer and director. She was born to a Jordanian father and Palestinian mother. She began her career making commercials and has worked in both documentary and fiction since 1999. Najjar lives in the Palestinian Territories.

== Works ==
Her debut feature film Pomegranates and Myrrh won 10 awards, and was released theatrically and screened at over 80 international festivals. When the film was first screened in Ramallah, there was public outcry by the Hamas Government in Gaza over the film's portrayal of "what was deemed its 'unpatriotic' portrayal of an untrustworthy wife of a political prisoner." At the Doha Tribeca Film Festival, the film won the Best Arab Film award.

The 1999 documentary film Naim and Wadee’a was based on Najjar's family and includes the oral histories of Na’im Azar and Wadee’a Aghabi, a couple who were forced to leave their Jaffa home in 1948. The film won the Award for Films of Conflict and Resolution at the 2000 Hamptons International Film Festival.

Her film, Eyes of a Thief, was the official Palestinian submission to the 87th Academy Awards.

== Filmography ==
The following are some of the films he has made:

- Naim and Wadee’a (1999)
- Quintessence of Oblivion (2000)
- A Boy Named Mohamed (2001)
- Blue Gold (2004)
- They Came from the East (2004)
- Yasmine Tughani (2006)
- Pomegranates and Myrrh (2009)
- Eyes of a Thief (2014)
- Between Heaven and Earth (2019)
