= Kim Farrant =

Australian film director

- Born: Australia
- Occupation: Film director

Kim Farrant is an Australian film director best known for her work on Strangerland (2015), Angel of Mine (2019) and The Weekend Away (2022).
