= Christie Burke =

Canadian actress

- Burke in 2024
- Born: Christie Stainthorpe; October 20, 1989 (age 37); Canada
- Occupations: Actress, model
- Years active: 2010–present
- Height: 5 ft 7 in (170 cm)

Christie Burke (born October 20, 1989) is a Canadian actress known for her portrayal of Renesmee Cullen in The Twilight Saga: Breaking Dawn – Part 2. The actor graduated from New Westminster Secondary School in 2007. She also portrayed Barbara, a love interest of Billy the Kid, in the series of the same name. Since 2023, Burke has a lead role in the TV series The Ark on Syfy.

== Filmography ==
=== Film ===
Year	Title	Role	Notes
2011	The Twilight Saga: Breaking Dawn – Part 1	Teenage Renesmee	
2011	Best Day Ever: Aiden Kessler 1994-2011	Melissa	
2012	Crowsnest	Danielle	
2012	The Twilight Saga: Breaking Dawn – Part 2	Teenage Renesmee	
2013	A Single Shot	Ingrid	
2013	True Love Waits	Tammy	Short film
2014	Black Fly	Paula	
2016	Love Everlasting	Clover	
2017	Still/Born	Mary	
2018	Ascension	Becca	
2025	What We Dreamed of Then	Kya	
2026	Tight Lettuce (Tissé serré)	Taylor	

=== Television ===
Year	Title	Role	Notes
2010	Eureka	College Girl	"The Story of O2"
2010	Tower Prep	Noelle	"The Rooks"
2013	Restless Virgins	Madison	TV film
2014	Almost Human	Abby McKenzie	"Straw Man"
2014	Falling Skies	Elise	"A Thing with Feathers", "Drawing Straws", "Shoot the Moon"
2014	Blackstone	Chloe	"Sext Me", "Truth or Dare"
2014-15	Strange Empire	Miss Logan	Recurring role
2015	Ungodly Acts	Candace	TV film
2016	Van Helsing	Emma	TV series
2017	Supernatural	Alice/Smash	"The Scorpion and the Frog"
2019	Mystery 101: Playing Dead	Josie Hart	Television film (Hallmark Movies and Mysteries)
2020	The Haunting of Bly Manor	Flora Wingrave (Older)	Guest Co-starring
2021	Maid	Tania	Netflix mini series
2023–present	The Ark	Lt./Capt. Sharon Garnet (and clones)	Main role; TV series
2023	Billy the Kid	Barbara Jones	TV series
