= Conversation with the Sea =

2026 drama film by Muayad Alayan

- Arabic: حوار مع البحر
- Directed by: Muayad Alayan
- Written by: Muayad Alayan; Rami Alayan
- Produced by: Muayad Alayan; Rami Alayan
- Starring: Kamel El Basha; Amer Hlehel; Bahira Ablassi; Maria Zreik
- Cinematography: Lorenzo Casadio Vannucci
- Edited by: Matteo Faccenda
- Music by: Fabienne van Eck
- Production companies: PalCine Productions; KeyFilm; Metafora Production; Hubert Bals Fund; Netherlands Film Fund; Red Sea Fund; Doha Film Institute
- Release date: 7 September 2026 (Venice)
- Running time: 112 minutes
- Countries: Palestine; Netherlands; Saudi Arabia; Qatar
- Languages: Arabic; Hebrew; English

Conversation with the Sea (Arabic: حوار مع البحر) is a 2026 drama film directed by Muayad Alayan, co-written with Rami Alayan. A co-production of Palestine, Netherlands, Saudi Arabia, and Qatar, it stars Kamel El Basha, Amer Hlehel, Bahira Ablassi and Maria Zreik.

The film had its world premiere in the Venice Spotlight section of the 83rd Venice International Film Festival on 7 September 2026.

== Premise ==
A 60-year-old Palestinian man receives an Israeli court order requesting a social security debt payment in his late son's name, who allegedly drowned two decades earlier. When no record of the death can be found, he embarks on a journey to discover what happened.

== Cast ==
- Kamel El Basha as Kamal
- Amer Hlehel
- Bahira Ablassi
- Maria Zreik
- Ruba Blal
- Haitham Omari
- Bahira Ablassi
- Rebecca Esmeralda Telhami

== Release ==
It had its world premiere in the Venice Spotlight section of the 83rd Venice International Film Festival on 7 September 2026. It will also screen at the 2026 Toronto International Film Festival in the Centrepiece section.
