= 2016 Academy Awards =

2016 Academy Awards may refer to:

- 88th Academy Awards, the Academy Awards ceremony that took place in 2016, honoring the best in film for 2015
- 89th Academy Awards, the Academy Awards ceremony that took place in 2017, honoring the best in film for 2016
