= Maha Haj =

Palestinian director and screenwriter (born 1970)

Maha Haj مها حاج
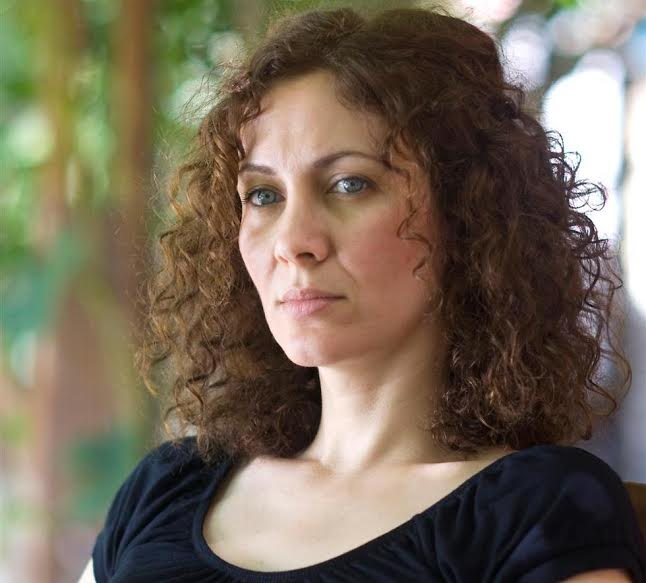
- Born: 1970 (age 55–56); Nazareth
- Education: Hebrew University of Jerusalem
- Occupations: Film director and screenwriter

Maha Haj (Arabic: مها حاج; born in 1970) film director and screenwriter.

== Life and career ==
Haj was born in Nazareth. She was educated in the Baptist Christian school in Nazareth, though both her parents were communist activists. Under her father's influence she began studying pharmacy science, but after a year switched to literature, and completed her BA in English and Arabic literature at the Hebrew University of Jerusalem, and her MA in language and literature at Haifa University. She began working as a teacher, but was more interested in her art and writing, which she practiced in her free time.

She began her cinematic career working as a set designer, script doctor, and art director on such films as Elia Suleiman's The Time That Remains (2009), Ziad Doueiri's The Attack (2012); followed by Adi Adouan's Arabani (2014) and Rafael Najari's Over the Hilltop (2014).

In 2009, she wrote and directed the short film Burtuqal, which was released to critical acclaim, and was screened at many international film festivals, and then the documentary film Within These Walls (2010).

She achieved international recognition in 2016 with her film Personal Affairs, which had its international premiere at the Cannes Film Festival, in the Un Certain Regard section. She both wrote and directed the film, which won Best Feature Film at the Haifa International Film Festival. In their reasoning, the judges wrote: "It is a creation that is entirely love of humankind, fluent and funny, captivating and kindhearted, a contemporary human mosaic, both local and universal."

Haj detailed the difficulties, both logistically and emotionally, she faced getting public funding though the Israeli Film Fund (IFF) for her film Personal Affairs. Then Israeli Minister of Culture Limor Livnat established regulations that require any project receiving public funds to be presented as strictly an Israeli feature, not as a Palestinian-Israeli or Palestinian film, causing difficulties for filmmakers like Haj who want to highlight their Palestinian and/or dual identities. Ultimately, the IFF backed the project after Haj and her producer agreed to the terms to release the movie as an Israeli feature.

In 2022, Mediterranean Fever, which she wrote and directed, premiered at the 2022 Cannes Film Festival within the Un certain regard section, and won the Prize for Best Screenplay. in 2024, Upshot, which she directed, won the prize for short film at the El Gouna Film Festival 2024.

== Filmography ==
=== Feature films ===
Year	English Title	Original Title	Notes
2016	Personal Affairs	עניינים אישיים	
2022	Mediterranean Fever	حمى البحر المتوسط	
2026	Orient Adagio		Post-production

=== Short films ===
Year	Title	Notes
2009	Burtuqal	
2010	Within These Walls	Documentary
2014	Personal Matters	
2024	Upshot	

=== Other credits ===
Year	Title	Role
2009	The Time That Remains	Set design, art director
2012	The Attack	Set design, art director
2013	A Strange Course of Events	Production designer
2014	Arabani	Set design, art director
2014	Over the Hilltop	Set design, art director

== Awards and nominations ==
Year	Nominated work	Category	Result	Notes
2016	Personal Affairs	Best Film, Haifa International Film Festival	Won	
2016	Personal Affairs	Un Certain Regard, Cannes Film Festival	Nominated	
2016	Personal Affairs	Caméra d'Or, Cannes Film Festival	Nominated	
2016	Personal Affairs	Best Film, International Film Festival of India	Nominated	
2016	Personal Affairs	Special Mention – International Feature Film, Zurich Film Festival	Won	
2016	Personal Affairs	Golden Eye – Best International Feature Film, Zurich Film Festival	Nominated	
2016	Personal Affairs	Critics' Award, Montpellier Film Festival	Won	
2016	Personal Affairs	Best Debut Feature, Philadelphia Film Festival	Won	
2022	Mediterranean Fever	Un Certain Regard Best Screenplay Prize, 2022 Cannes Film Festival	Won	
