= Mediterranean Fever (film) =

Black comedy drama film

- Cannes release poster
- Arabic: حمى البحر المتوسط
- Directed by: Maha Haj
- Written by: Maha Haj
- Produced by: Baher Agbariya; Thanassis Karathanos; Martin Hampel; Juliette Lepoutre; Pierre Menahem; Marios Piperides; Janine Teerling
- Starring: Amer Hlehel; Ashraf Farah; Anat Hadid; Samir Elias; Cynthia Saleem
- Cinematography: Antoine Héberlé
- Edited by: Véronique Lange
- Music by: Munder Odeh
- Production companies: Majdal Films; Pallas Film; Still Moving; Amp Filmworks
- Release date: 25 May 2022 (Cannes Film Festival)
- Running time: 108 minutes
- Countries: Germany; France; Cyprus; Palestine; Qatar
- Languages: Arabic; Hebrew; English

Mediterranean Fever (Arabic: حمى البحر المتوسط, romanized: ḥummā al-Baḥr al-Mutawassiṭ) is a 2022 internationally co-produced black comedy-drama film directed by Maha Haj, starring Amer Hlehel, Ashraf Farah, Anat Hadid, Samir Elias and Cynthia Saleem.

== Cast ==
- Amer Hlehel as Waleed
- Ashraf Farah as Jalal
- Anat Hadid as Ola
- Samir Elias
- Cynthia Saleem
- Shaden Kanboura

== Release ==
The film premiered in the Un Certain Regard section of the 75th annual Cannes Film Festival on 25 May 2022, where it won the best screenplay award.

== Reception ==
Kaleem Aftab of Cineuropa called it a "refreshing look at the region's political turmoil with a lovely friendship at its heart."

Leslie Felperin of The Hollywood Reporter wrote that Haj "builds the story up with small jenga blocks of humor and well-observed vignettes, so soft and gentle that it’s barely noticeable when the tower starts to teeter with dread as the stakes get higher and the threat of violence more distinct."

Tim Grierson of Screen Daily wrote that the "slim" tale is "elevated" by the performances of Hlehel and Farah, "ably portraying men each dealing with secret struggles they can’t always articulate."
