= Basil Khalil =

British-Palestinian filmmaker

Basil Khalil is a British-Palestinian filmmaker. Khalil's film Ave Maria was nominated for an Academy Award for Best Live Action Short Film.

== Early life ==
Khalil was born and raised in Nazareth, to a Palestinian father and a British mother.

== Career ==
Khalil studied for an MA from Screen Academy Scotland. Khalil spent several years working in London on TV productions, including on the popular Jamie Oliver cookery shows.

In 2015, Khalil directed Ave Maria, a 14-minute comic short about Palestinian Catholic nuns in a West Bank convent who have an encounter with Israeli settlers. The film premiered in the official selection at the Cannes Film Festival 2015 and went on to screen at more than eighty film festivals worldwide. It was nominated for the Academy Awards in the 'Live Action Shorts' category.

His 2022 film A Gaza Weekend was named the winner of the FIPRESCI Prize at the 2022 Toronto International Film Festival.
