= The Time That Remains =

- UK release poster
- Directed by: Elia Suleiman
- Written by: Elia Suleiman
- Produced by: Hani Farsi; Michael Gentile
- Starring: Elia Suleiman; Saleh Bakri; Leila Mouammar; Bilal Zidani; Samar Qudha Tanus
- Cinematography: Marc-André Batigne
- Edited by: Véronique Lange
- Music by: Matthieu Sibony
- Distributed by: Le Pacte
- Release date: 12 August 2009
- Running time: 109 minutes
- Countries: United Kingdom; Italy; Belgium; France
- Languages: Hebrew; Arabic; English

The Time That Remains is a 2009 semi-biographical drama film written and directed by Palestinian director Elia Suleiman. The film stars Ali Suliman, Elia Suleiman, Saleh Bakri and Samar Qudha Tanus. It gives an account of Palestinian life under Israeli occupation. Suleiman participated in the 2009 Cannes Film Festival, as his new film competed in the official selection category. The Time That Remains was also screened at the 2009 Toronto International Film Festival. In November 2009, the film won the Jury Grand Prize (with About Elly) at the Asia Pacific Screen Awards. The film won the Critics Prize of the Argentinian Film Critics Association at Mar del Plata International Film Festival.

== Plot ==
The Time That Remains (2009) is a semi-biographical film that follows Palestinian life from 1948 to the present day through the story of director Elia Suleiman's family. The plot is divided into four episodes that depict the filmmaker's father, Fouad Suleiman, as a resistance fighter in 1948, the struggles of his family under Israeli military rule in the 1960s, and finally, Elia's own experiences as an adolescent and adult. The film uses a comedic and surreal style to portray the daily life, absurdities, and humiliations of Palestinians living as a minority in their own homeland.

== Cast ==
- Ali Suliman - Eliza's boyfriend
- Saleh Bakri - Fuad
- Maisa Abd Elhadi - Woman in West Bank taxi
- Zidane Awad - The Student
- Elia Suleiman - ES
- Menashe Noy - Taxi driver
- Izabel Ramadan - Olga
- Yasmine Haj - Nadia
- Leila Muammar - Thuraya

== Reception ==
=== Critical response ===
Review aggregation website Rotten Tomatoes reported an 86% approval rating, based on 49 reviews, with an average rating of 7/10. On Metacritic, the film has a score of 74/100 based on 14 reviews, indicating "generally favorable reviews".
