= Mai Masri =

Palestinian filmmaker

- مي المصري
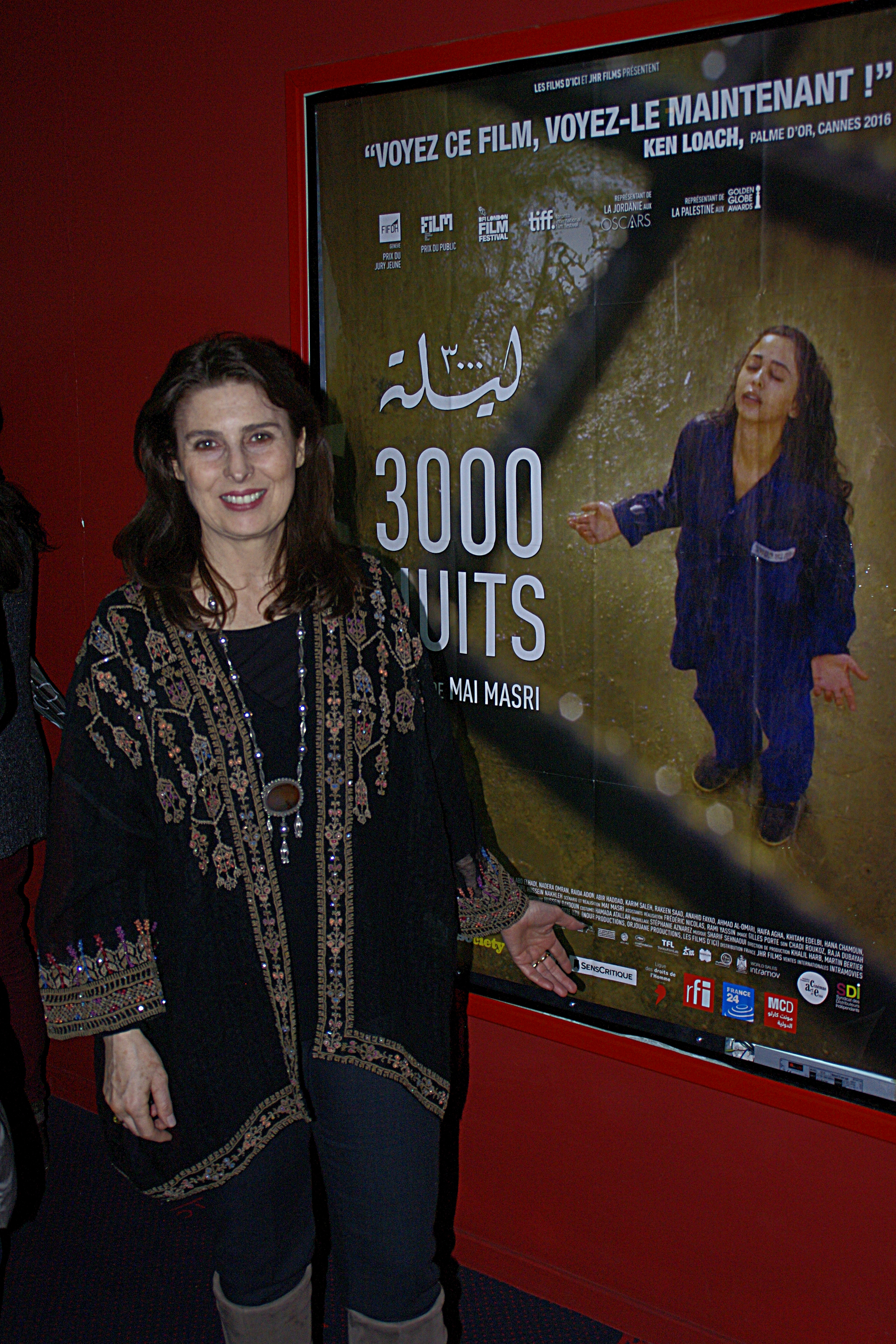
- Born: Mai Masri; April 2, 1959 (age 67); Amman, Jordan
- Occupation: Filmmaker
- Years active: 1983–present
- Notable work: 3000 Nights
- Father: Munib Masri

Mai Masri (Arabic: مي المصري; born April 2, 1959) is a Palestinian filmmaker, director and producer. Her films are primarily documentaries which focus on the real life struggles of the women and children living in the occupied Palestinian territories and Lebanon. She has received over 60 international awards for her films and is hailed as a pioneer in the Middle Eastern film industry.

== Early life ==
Masri was born in Amman, Jordan on April 2, 1959. She is the daughter of Munib Masri from Nablus and an American mother from Texas. She spent her early childhood in Amman and Nablus moving to Beirut when she was in the first grade. Masri was introduced to politics early in her life through her father, Munib al-Masri. Her father was close friends with the leaders of the Palestine Liberation Organization including Yasser Arafat and Khalil al-Wazir who would often visit them in their home. Politics played a large role in her family as her father acted as a minister in Jordan in the 1970s.

In 1976 she visited Berkeley, California where she had attended a lecture on film theory that fascinated her and led her to pursue an education in film. She graduated from San Francisco State University in 1981 with a Bachelor of Arts degree in film production and technique. Soon after, she returned to Beirut and began making films.

== Personal life and career ==
In 1977 while visiting Beirut on her summer break from college, Masri met her husband, the late Lebanese filmmaker Jean Chamoun (1942-2017). The pair connected through their shared love of film making and its ability to influence people’s lives. Masri then went back to San Francisco to finish her degree and returned to Beirut in 1981. At this time the Israeli invasion of Lebanon had begun, and Masri and Chamoun had to abandon a project they were working on. Instead that summer the pair shot rousing footage under dangerous conditions which they would later use in their films Wild Flowers (1986), Suspended Dreams (1992), Under the Rubble (1983) and War Generation (1989). In 1986 Masri and Chamoun were married and had founded Nour Productions. The couple have two daughters. On August 9, 2017 Masri's husband Jean Chamoun died after a long battle with Alzheimer's disease. The pair's partnership led to the production of a total of 15 films, all of which gave voice to stories of peoples living under the hardships of war. Their work is praised for becoming the instrument of change and creativity which they had bonded over and set to achieve.

After their first film, Under the Rubble (1983), Masri and Chamoun bought their own equipment allowing them to produce low budget films on their own terms. They lived in Paris for a year to network outside of the Arab film industry, in order to be able to produce and distribute films abroad. The pair received their big break when the BBC commissioned War Generation for their Inside Story.

== Works ==
=== Filmography ===
Masri's pictures focus on Palestine and the Middle East and have won awards at film festivals throughout the world. Her films revolve around the lives of ordinary people who are living in bizarre times of conflict and how they manage to keep their humanity throughout the reality of their devastating situations. Her films aim to capture authenticity and as a result tell a different story to the stereotypical dehumanization and dismissing of Palestinians rights portrayed in dominate discourses.

- Under the Rubble (1983)
- Wild Flowers: Women of South Lebanon (1986)
- War Generation (1989)
- Children of Fire (1990)
- Suspended Dreams (1992)
- Hanan Ashrawi: A Woman of Her Time (1995)
- Children of Shatila (1998)
- Frontiers of Dreams and Fears (2001)
- Beirut Diaries (2006)
- 33 Days (2007)
- 3000 Nights (2015), she received an honorary award at the Esenler Film Festival.
- Beirut: Eye of the Storm (2021)

=== Article ===
- Masri, Mai. (January 2008) "Transcending Boundaries", This Week in Palestine.
