= Rashid Masharawi =

Palestinian film director (born 1962)

- رشيد مشهراوي
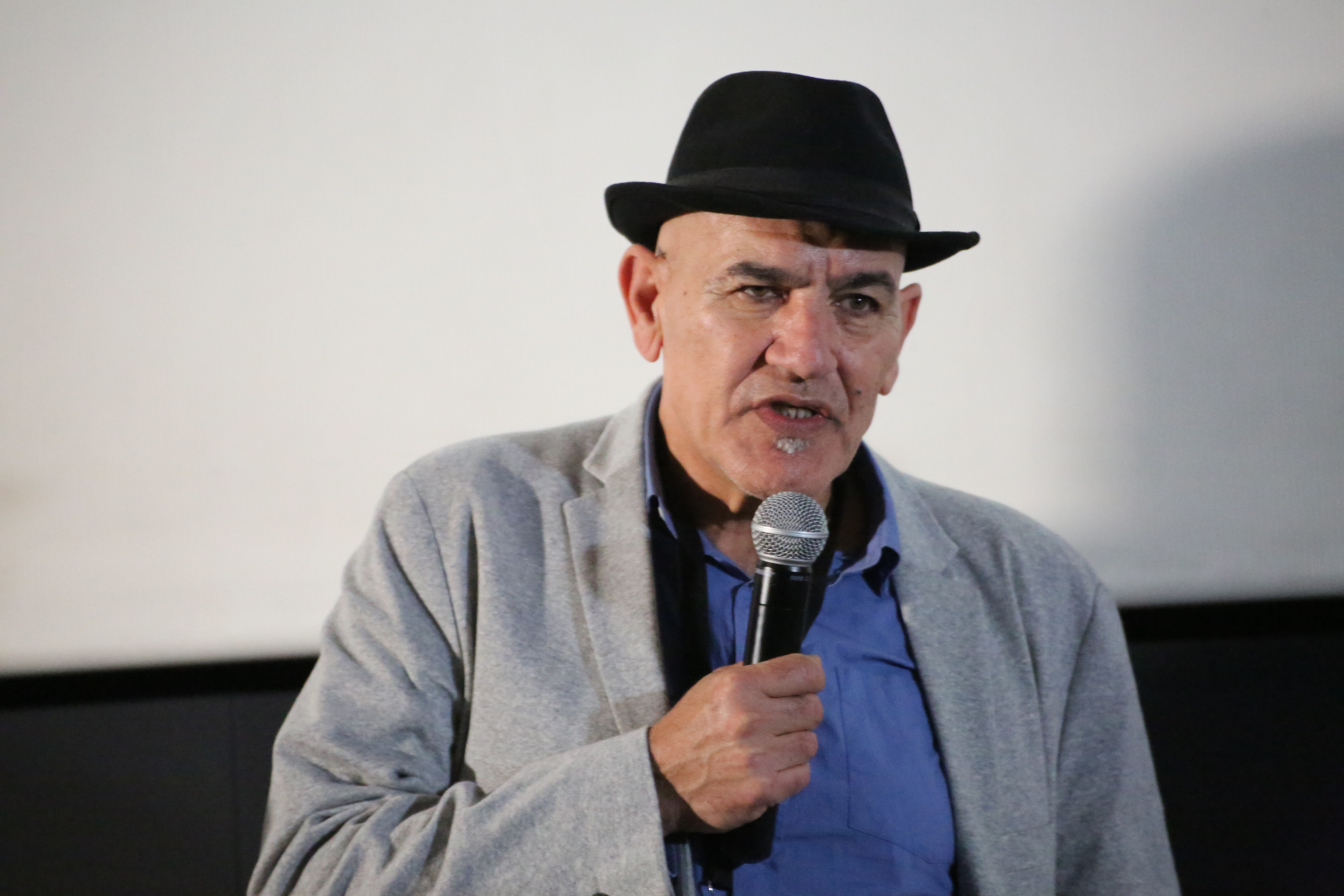
- Born: 1962; Gaza City
- Occupation: Film Director

Rashid Masharawi (also: "Rashid Mashrawi") (Arabic: رشيد مشهراوي) is a Palestinian film director, born in Gaza in 1962 to a family of refugees from Jaffa. He grew up in the Shati refugee camp.

Rashid Masharawi lives and works in Ramallah, where he founded the Cinema Production and Distribution Center in 1996 with the aim of promoting local film productions. He also sponsors a mobile cinema, which allows him to screen films in Palestinian refugee camps. Other projects include the annual Kids Film Festival and major workshops on film production and directing. Rashid Masharawi regularly organises readings and discussion forums at the Al-Matal cultural centre. Through his documentaries and feature films, he has made a name for himself as a film artist and has received several film awards.

== Filmography ==
- Travel Document (1987)
- The Shelter, (1989) Fiction
- Dar o dur (1991)
- The Magician (1992)
- Curfew (Hatta Ishaar Akhar) (1994) At the Cannes International Film Festival he was awarded the Unesco Film Award for Curfew and received the audience and critics' prize for the best film at the Montpellier Film Festival.
- Haifa (1996)
- Rabab (1997)
- Tension (1998)
- Love Season (2001)
- Ticket to Jerusalem (2002), feature film Won a number of awards.
- Live from Palestine, (2002), documentary, 57 min
- Homemovie (2002)
- Checkpoint (2002)
- Waiting, (2005) film / TV, feature film
- Arafat, My Brother, (2005) film / TV, documentary
- Laila's Birthday (2008)
- Land of the Story (2012)
- Palestine Stereo (2013)
- Letters From Al Yarmouk (2014)
- Writing On Snow (2017)
- From Ground Zero (2024)

== See also ==
- Duki Dror
- From Ground Zero
