= List of Jordanian submissions for the Academy Award for Best International Feature Film =

Best International Feature Film submissions from Jordan

Highlights
- Debut: 2008
- Submissions: 10
- Nominations: 1
- Oscar winners: none

Jordan is one of one hundred countries that have submitted films for the Academy Award for Best International Feature Film. (Note: The category was previously named the Academy Award for Best Foreign Language Film, but this was changed to the Academy Award for Best International Feature Film in April 2019, after the Academy deemed the word "Foreign" to be outdated.) Their first submission was in 2008. The award is handed out annually by the United States Academy of Motion Picture Arts and Sciences to a feature-length motion picture produced outside the United States that contains primarily non-English dialogue.

As of 2026, Jordan was nominated only once, for Theeb (2015).

== Submissions ==
The Academy of Motion Picture Arts and Sciences has invited the film industries of various countries to submit their best film for the Academy Award for Best International Feature Film since 1956. The International Feature Film Committee oversees the process and reviews all the submitted films. Following this, they vote via secret ballot to determine the five nominees for the award.

Its first ever submission, Captain Abu Raed (2008), was the country first feature film to be made in Jordan in more than fifty years, it follows the story of an airport janitor who is mistaken as a pilot by a group of orphan children. It was directed by Los Angeles-based director, Amin Matalqa who studied filmmaking in the United States. Although the film was lauded by many Oscar pundits as a favorite, after winning the 2008 Sundance Film Festival "World Cinema" section, it ultimately failed to make the 9-film shortlist.

Amira (2021), directed by Mohamed Diab, was withdrawn by the The Royal Film Commission – Jordan due to controversy surrounding the film's subject matter. The film was criticized by prisoners' rights organizations and withdrawn "out of respect to the feelings of the prisoners and their families".

The documentary My Sweet Land (2024), about the Second Nagorno-Karabakh War and directed by Sareen Hairabedian, was also withdrawn by the Royal Film Commission following diplomatic pressure from Azerbaijan. Additionally the film was banned in Jordan.

All That's Left of You (2025), directed by Cherien Dabis, made into the December shortlist, but was not nominated. It marked the first film directed by a woman to be selected as the country official submission.

Below is a list of the films that have been submitted by Jordan for review by the academy for the award by year and the respective Academy Awards ceremony.

Year (Ceremony)	Film title used in nomination	Original title	Director	Result
2008 (81st)	Captain Abu Raed	كابتن أبو رائد	Amin Matalqa	Not nominated
2015 (88th)	Theeb	ذيب	Naji Abu Nowar	Nominated
2016 (89th)	3000 Nights	3000 ليلة	Mai Masri	Not nominated
2020 (93rd)	200 Meters	200 متر	Ameen Nayfeh	Not nominated
2021 (94th)	Amira	أميرة	Mohamed Diab	Withdrawn
2022 (95th)	Farha	فرحة	Darin J. Sallam	Not nominated
2023 (96th)	Inshallah a Boy	إن شاء الله ولد	Amjad Al-Rasheed	Not nominated
2024 (97th)	My Sweet Land		Sareen Hairabedian	Withdrawn
2025 (98th)	All That's Left of You	اللي باقي منك	Cherien Dabis	Made shortlist
2026 (99th)	Sink	غرق	Zain Duraie	Pending

== See also ==
- List of Academy Award winners and nominees for Best International Feature Film
- List of Academy Award-winning foreign language films
- Cinema of Jordan
