= List of submissions to the 94th Academy Awards for Best International Feature Film =

2021 Best International Feature submissions
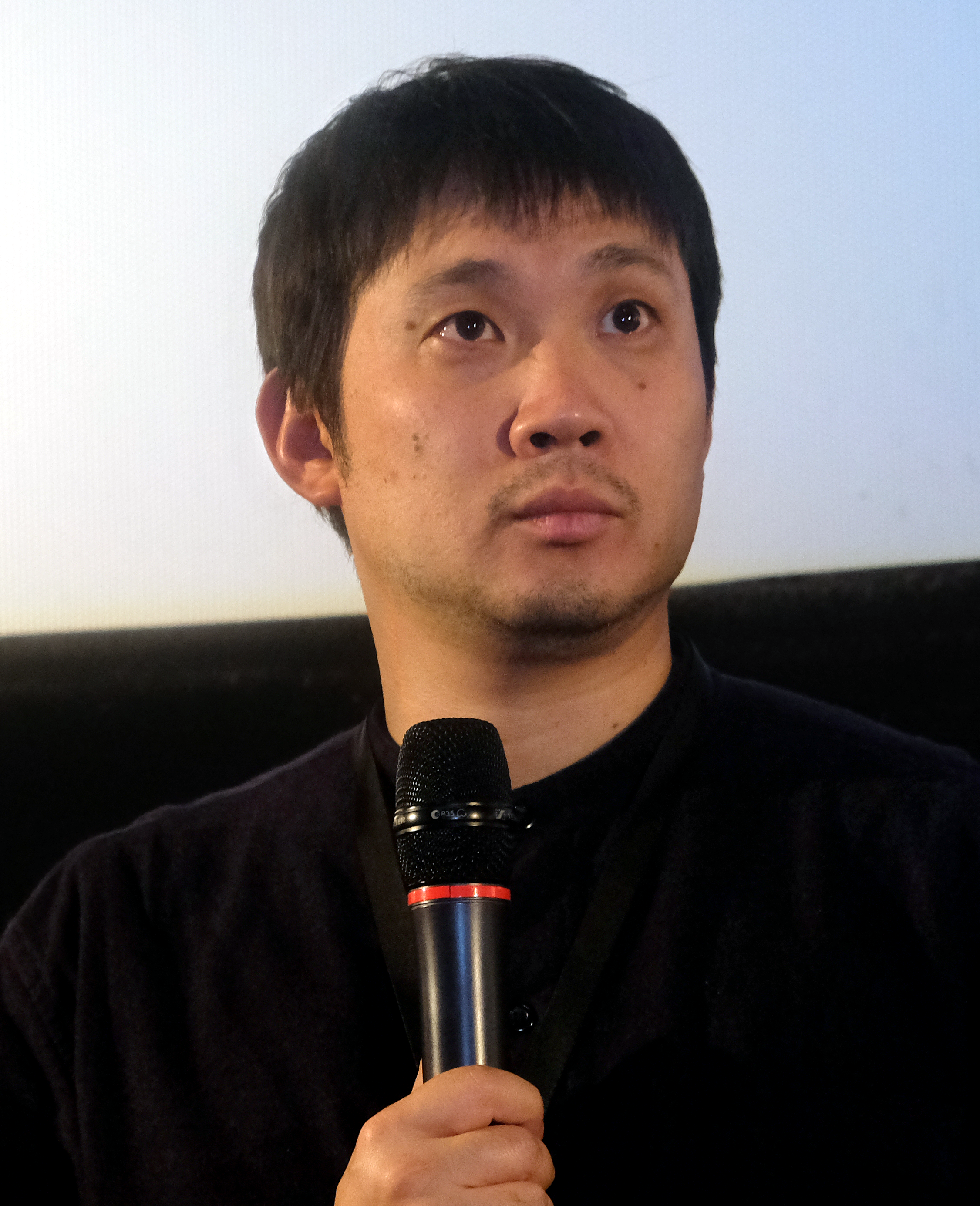
- Ryusuke Hamaguchi directed Drive My Car, which won the year's award.

Highlights
- Oscar winner: (Japan) Drive My Car
- Submissions: 93
- Debuts: 1
- Total eligible: 92

This is a list of submissions to the 94th Academy Awards for the Best International Feature Film. The Academy of Motion Picture Arts and Sciences (AMPAS) has invited the film industries of various countries to submit their best film for the Academy Award for Best International Feature Film every year since the award was created in 1956. The award is presented annually by the Academy to a feature-length motion picture produced outside the United States that contains primarily non-English dialogue. The International Feature Film Award Committee oversees the process and reviews all the submitted films. The category was previously called the Best Foreign Language Film, but this was changed in April 2019 to Best International Feature Film, after the Academy deemed the word "Foreign" to be outdated.

For the 94th Academy Awards, the submitted motion pictures must have first been released theatrically in their respective countries between 1 January 2021 and 31 December 2021. The deadline for submissions to the Academy was 1 November 2021. 93 countries submitted films and were found to be eligible by AMPAS and screened for voters. Somalia submitted a film for the first time, and Algeria, Bhutan, and Uzbekistan resubmitted their films disqualified from last year's list. Jordan withdrew their film on 9 December 2021, leaving 92 eligible entries. After the 15-film shortlist was announced on 21 December 2021, the five nominees were announced on 8 February 2022.

Japan won the award for the fifth time with Drive My Car by Ryusuke Hamaguchi, which was also nominated for Best Picture, Best Director and Best Adapted Screenplay.

== Submissions ==
Submitting country	Film title used in nomination	Original title	Language(s)	Director(s)	Result
Albania	Two Lions to Venice	Dy luanë drejt Venecias	Albanian, Italian	Jonid Jorgji	Not nominated
Algeria	Héliopolis	هيليوبوليس	Arabic, French	Djafar Gacem	Not nominated
Argentina	The Intruder	El prófugo	Spanish	Natalia Meta	Not nominated
Armenia	Should the Wind Drop	Si le vent tombe / Երբ որ քամին հանդարտվի	French, Armenian, Karabakh Armenian, English, Russian	Nora Martirosyan	Not nominated
Australia	When Pomegranates Howl		Pashto, Persian, English	Granaz Moussavi	Not nominated
Austria	Great Freedom	Große Freiheit	German	Sebastian Meise	Made shortlist
Azerbaijan	The Island Within	Daxildəki ada	Azerbaijani	Ru Hasanov	Not nominated
Bangladesh	Rehana	রেহানা মরিয়ম নূর	Bengali	Abdullah Mohammad Saad	Not nominated
Belgium	Playground	Un monde	French	Laura Wandel	Made shortlist
Bhutan	Lunana: A Yak in the Classroom	ལུང་ནག་ན	Dzongkha, English	Pawo Choyning Dorji	Nominated
Bolivia	The Great Movement	El gran movimiento	Spanish	Kiro Russo	Not nominated
Bosnia and Herzegovina	The White Fortress	Tabija	Bosnian, English	Igor Drljaca	Not nominated
Brazil	Private Desert	Deserto Particular	Brazilian Portuguese	Aly Muritiba	Not nominated
Bulgaria	Fear	Страх	Bulgarian, English	Ivaylo Hristov	Not nominated
Cambodia	White Building	ប៊ូឌីញ ស	Khmer	Kavich Neang	Not nominated
Cameroon	Hidden Dreams	Rêves cachés	Cameroonian Pidgin English, English, French	Ngang Romanus	Not nominated
Canada	Drunken Birds	Les oiseaux ivres	French, Spanish, English, Mandarin	Ivan Grbovic	Not nominated
Chad	Lingui, The Sacred Bonds	Lingui, les liens sacrés	French, Arabic	Mahamat-Saleh Haroun	Not nominated
Chile	White on White	Blanco en blanco	Spanish, English	Théo Court	Not nominated
China	Cliff Walkers	悬崖之上	Mandarin, Northeastern Mandarin	Zhang Yimou	Not nominated
Colombia	Memoria		Spanish, English	Apichatpong Weerasethakul	Not nominated
Costa Rica	Clara Sola		Spanish	Nathalie Álvarez Mesén	Not nominated
Croatia	Tereza37		Croatian	Danilo Šerbedžija	Not nominated
Czech Republic	Zátopek		Czech, English, German, Finnish, French	David Ondříček	Not nominated
Denmark	Flee	Flugt	Danish, Dari, Russian, Swedish, French, English	Jonas Poher Rasmussen	Nominated
Dominican Republic	Holy Beasts	La fiera y la fiesta	Spanish, French, English	Laura Amelia Guzmán and Israel Cárdenas	Not nominated
Ecuador	Submersible	Sumergible	Spanish	Alfredo León León	Not nominated
Egypt	Souad	سعاد	Arabic	Ayten Amin	Not nominated
Estonia	On the Water	Vee peal	Estonian, Võro, Russian	Peeter Simm	Not nominated
Finland	Compartment No. 6	Hytti nro 6	Finnish, Russian, English	Juho Kuosmanen	Made shortlist
France	Titane		French	Julia Ducournau	Not nominated
Georgia	Brighton 4th	მეოთხე ბრაიტონი	Georgian, English, Russian, Kazakh	Levan Koguashvili	Not nominated
Germany	I'm Your Man	Ich bin dein Mensch	German	Maria Schrader	Made shortlist
Greece	Digger		Greek	Georgis Grigorakis	Not nominated
Haiti	Freda		Haitian Creole, French	Gessica Généus	Not nominated
Hong Kong	Zero to Hero	媽媽的神奇小子	Cantonese, English	Jimmy Wan	Not nominated
Hungary	Post Mortem		Hungarian, German	Péter Bergendy	Not nominated
Iceland	Lamb	Dýrið	Icelandic	Valdimar Jóhannsson	Made shortlist
India	Pebbles	கூழாங்கல்	Tamil	P. S. Vinothraj	Not nominated
Indonesia	Yuni		Serang Javanese, Banten Sundanese, Indonesian	Kamila Andini	Not nominated
Iran	A Hero	قهرمان	Persian	Asghar Farhadi	Made shortlist
Iraq	Europa	أوروبا	Arabic, Bulgarian, English	Haider Rashid	Not nominated
Ireland	Shelter	Foscaḋ	Irish	Seán Breathnach	Not nominated
Israel	Let It Be Morning	ויהי בוקר / ليكن صباحا	Arabic, Hebrew	Eran Kolirin	Not nominated
Italy	The Hand of God	È stata la mano di Dio	Italian, Neapolitan	Paolo Sorrentino	Nominated
Japan	Drive My Car	ドライブ・マイ・カー	Japanese, English, Korean Sign Language, German, Mandarin, Filipino, Korean, Indonesian, Malay	Ryusuke Hamaguchi	Won Academy Award
Jordan	Amira	ʾأميرة	Arabic, Hebrew	Mohamed Diab	Withdrawn
Kazakhstan	Yellow Cat	Сары мысық / Жёлтая кошка	Kazakh, Russian	Adilkhan Yerzhanov	Not nominated
Kenya	Mission to Rescue		Swahili, English, Somali	Gilbert Lukalia	Not nominated
Kosovo	Hive	Zgjoi	Albanian	Blerta Basholli	Made shortlist
Kyrgyzstan	Shambala	Шамбала	Kyrgyz, English	Artykpai Suyundukov	Not nominated
Latvia	The Pit	Bedre	Latvian	Dace Pūce	Not nominated
Lebanon	Costa Brava, Lebanon	كوستابرافا	Arabic	Mounia Akl	Not nominated
Lithuania	Isaac	Izaokas	Lithuanian, German, Russian	Jurgis Matulevičius	Not nominated
Luxembourg	Io sto bene		Italian, Luxembourgish, French, English	Donato Rotunno	Not nominated
Malawi	Fatsani: A Tale of Survival	Fatsani	Chewa, English	Gift Sukez Sukali	Not nominated
Malaysia	Hail, Driver!	Prebet Sapu	Malay, Mandarin	Muzzamer Rahman	Not nominated
Malta	Luzzu		Maltese	Alex Camilleri	Not nominated
Mexico	Prayers for the Stolen	Noche de fuego	Spanish	Tatiana Huezo	Made shortlist
Montenegro	After the Winter	Poslije zime	Montenegrin, Serbian	Ivan Bakrač	Not nominated
Morocco	Casablanca Beats	علّي صوتك / Haut et fort	Arabic, French	Nabil Ayouch	Not nominated
Netherlands	Do Not Hesitate		Dutch, English, Arabic	Shariff Korver	Not nominated
North Macedonia	Sisterhood	Сестри	Macedonian	Dina Duma	Not nominated
Norway	The Worst Person in the World	Verdens verste menneske	Norwegian	Joachim Trier	Nominated
Palestine	The Stranger	الغريب	Arabic, Hebrew	Ameer Fakher Eldin	Not nominated
Panama	Plaza Catedral		Spanish	Abner Benaim	Made shortlist
Paraguay	Nothing but the Sun	Apenas el sol	Ayoreo, Spanish	Arami Ullón	Not nominated
Peru	Powerful Chief	Manco Cápac	Spanish, Puno Quechua	Henry Vallejo	Not nominated
Poland	Leave No Traces	Żeby nie było śladów	Polish	Jan P. Matuszyński	Not nominated
Portugal	The Metamorphosis of Birds	A Metamorfose dos Pássaros	Portuguese	Catarina Vasconcelos	Not nominated
Romania	Bad Luck Banging or Loony Porn	Babardeală cu bucluc sau porno balamuc	Romanian, Czech, French, Russian	Radu Jude	Not nominated
Russia	Unclenching the Fists	Разжимая кулаки	Ossetian	Kira Kovalenko	Not nominated
Saudi Arabia	The Tambour of Retribution	حد الطار	Arabic	Abdulaziz al-Shlahei	Not nominated
Serbia	Oasis	Оаза	Serbian	Ivan Ikić	Not nominated
Singapore	Precious Is the Night	今宵多珍重	Mandarin, English	Wayne Peng	Not nominated
Slovakia	107 Mothers	Cenzorka	Russian, Ukrainian, Slovak	Peter Kerekes	Not nominated
Slovenia	Sanremo		Slovene	Miroslav Mandić	Not nominated
Somalia	The Gravedigger's Wife		Somali	Khadar Ayderus Ahmed	Not nominated
South Africa	Barakat		Kaaps, Afrikaans, English	Amy Jephta	Not nominated
South Korea	Escape from Mogadishu	모가디슈	Korean, English, Somali, Arabic	Ryoo Seung-wan	Not nominated
Spain	The Good Boss	El buen patrón	Spanish, Arabic	Fernando León de Aranoa	Made shortlist
Sweden	Tigers	Tigrar	Swedish, Italian, English	Ronnie Sandahl	Not nominated
Switzerland	Olga	Ольга	French, Ukrainian, Russian, German	Elie Grappe	Not nominated
Taiwan	The Falls	瀑布	Mandarin, Taiwanese Hokkien	Chung Mong-hong	Not nominated
Thailand	The Medium	ร่างทรง	Isan, Thai	Banjong Pisanthanakun	Not nominated
Tunisia	Golden Butterfly	فرططو الذهب / Papillon d'or	Arabic, French	Abdelhamid Bouchnak	Not nominated
Turkey	Commitment Hasan	Bağlılık Hasan	Turkish	Semih Kaplanoğlu	Not nominated
Ukraine	Bad Roads	Погані дороги / Плохие дороги	Russian, Ukrainian	Nataliia Vorozhbyt	Not nominated
United Kingdom	Dying to Divorce	Ölümüne Boşanmak	Turkish, English	Chloe Fairweather	Not nominated
Uruguay	The Broken Glass Theory	La teoría de los vidrios rotos	Spanish	Diego Fernández	Not nominated
Uzbekistan	2000 Songs of Farida	Faridaning ikki ming qoʻshigʻi	Uzbek, Russian	Yalkin Tuychiev	Not nominated
Venezuela	The Inner Glow	Un destello interior	Spanish	Andrés Eduardo and Luis Alejandro Rodríguez	Not nominated
Vietnam	Dad, I'm Sorry	Bố già	Vietnamese	Trấn Thành and Vũ Ngọc Đãng	Not nominated

== Notes ==
- Jordan submitted Amira by Mohamed Diab, but it was withdrawn by the Royal Film Commission of Jordan due to controversy surrounding the film's subject matter. The film, which centers on a Palestinian girl who learns her real father was an Israeli prison guard rather than a Palestinian prisoner, was criticized by prisoners' rights organisations and withdrawn "out of respect to the feelings of the prisoners and their families." In the past, AMPAS has refused to accept withdrawals for political reasons, and there was no official announcement whether Amira was actually withdrawn from Oscar consideration.
- Lithuania initially reported that The Jump by Giedrė Žickytė was their selection, but Isaac by Jurgis Matulevičius was ultimately submitted.
- Namibia formed an approved Oscar Selection Committee for the first time. On 14 December 2021, the Namibia Film Commission issued a press release noting that they had received four submissions but that they "did not meet the qualifying criteria as set out by the Academy." However, The White Line by Desiree Kahikopo-Meiffret ran their Oscar campaign independently, without success.
- Nigeria launched an open call for submissions but later announced that they would not enter the race "due to the fact that the films received so far for screening failed the eligibility rule test set by the Academy".
- The Film Academy of the Philippines did not submit a film for the first time since 2005, citing funding issues and problems due to the COVID-19 pandemic. Directors' Guild of the Philippines, Inc. publicly expressed "great disappointment" that the Film Academy of the Philippines made no submission. The guild noted the eligible titles Fan Girl by Antoinette Jadaone, Hayop Ka! by Avid Liongoren, On the Job: The Missing 8 by Erik Matti and Tagpuan by Mac Alejandre.
- The Oscar Selection Committees for Ghana, Nepal, and Pakistan all invited filmmakers to make submissions, but no films were sent. Cinemas were closed in all three countries for most or all of the eligibility period due to the COVID-19 pandemic.
