= Noor Taher =

Palestinian actress (born 1989)

- نور طاهر
- Born: Noor Al Taher; 2 November 1999 (age 26); Amman, Jordan
- Citizenship: Jordan
- Occupations: Actress; model
- Years active: 2000s–present
- Known for: AlRawabi School for Girls

Noor Taher (Arabic: نور طاهر; born 2 November 1999) is a Palestinian actress and model. She is best known for her role as Layan Murad Fathi on the Netflix miniseries AIRawabi School for Girls.

== Early life ==
Noor Taher was born on November 2, 1999, in Amman, Jordan, to a Palestinian father and Lebanese mother. Noor is classically trained in ballet. She began acting at age four and was introduced to the film industry by her performing arts teacher, who was also a casting director at the time.

== Career ==
Taher stared appearing in films at age six, including Rowan Joffe's The Shooting Of Thomas Hurndall and Cyrus Nowrasteh's The Stoning of Soraya M both in 2008. After appearing in films at such a young age, Taher took a break until accepting another acting role in the 2019 film Infidel. Her most notable role was in the 2021 Netflix miniseries, AlRawabi School for Girls, which premiered in 32 languages across 190 countries.

In December 2023, Taher was listed as an "Arab Star of Tomorrow" by Screen Daily.

== Inspiration ==
In an interview to Harper's Bazaar Arabia, Taher says that the one person in the film industry that she really looks up to is her AlRawabi School for Girls co-star Rakeen Saad.

== Personal life ==
In March 2022, Taher revealed through her Instagram page she had dealt with epilepsy caused by a sudden seizure. She underwent brain surgery and was hospitalized for six days. Taher emphasized that these seizures were difficult to live with, as they were "not normal, but rather painful, and recovery from them does not come naturally." Taher wanted to spread public awareness about the disease and thanked her followers for showing support.

Her younger sister, Karam, is also an actress, starring in the 2021 film Farha.

== Credits ==
- The Stoning of Soraya M. (2008) (was credited as Noor Al Taher)
- The Shooting of Thomas Hurndall (2008) (was credited as Noor Al Taher)
- Infidel (2019)
- AlRawabi School for Girls (2021)
