= Andria Tayeh =

Lebanese Jordanian actress

- أندريا طايع
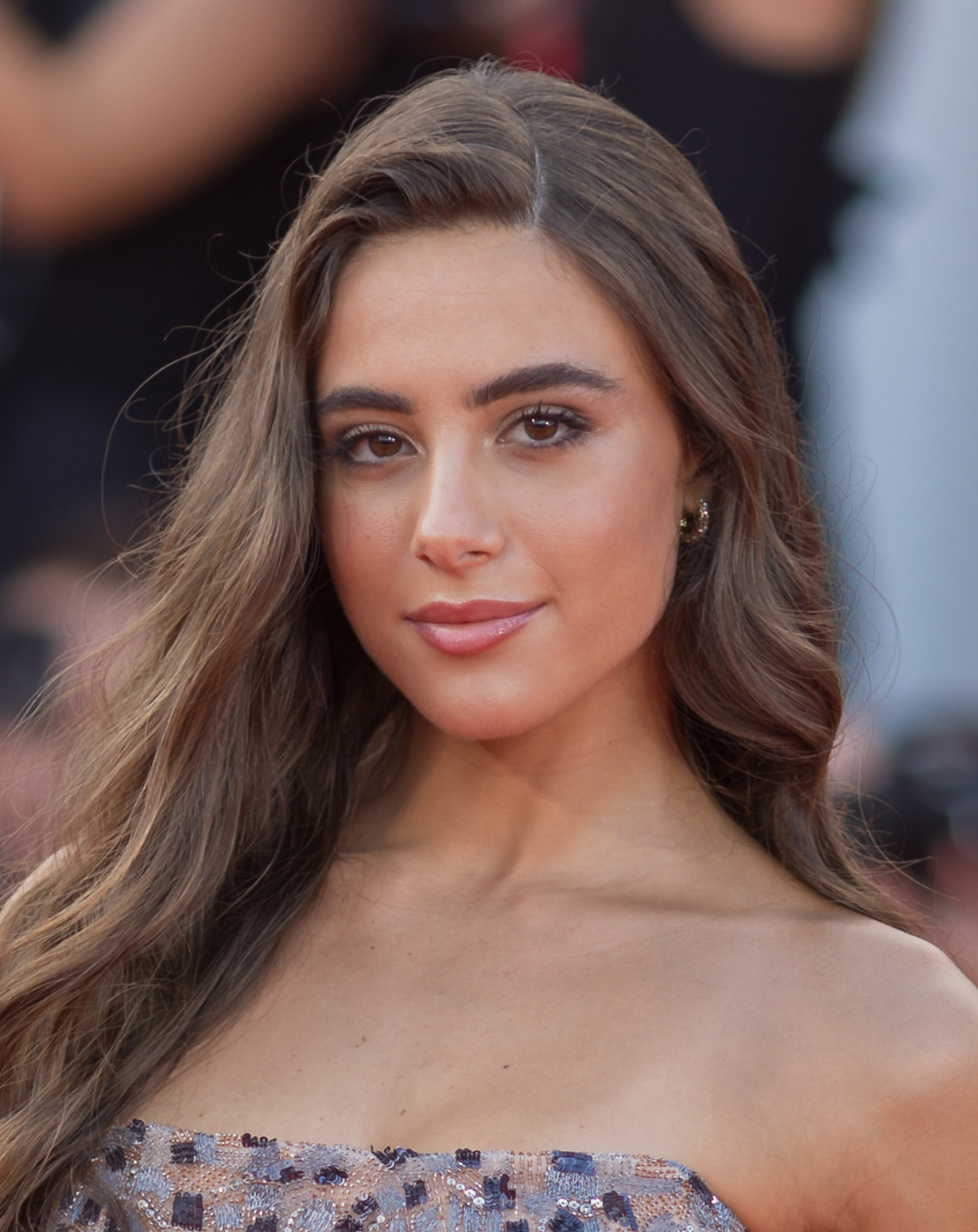
- Tayeh in 2025
- Born: 9 May 2001 (age 25); Amman, Jordan
- Education: Lebanese American University
- Occupations: Actress; model
- Years active: 2020 – present
- Known for: AlRawabi School for Girls

Andria Tayeh (Arabic: أندريا طايع; born 9 May 2001) is a Lebanese and Jordanian actress and model, known for her role as Mariam in the Netflix miniseries AlRawabi School for Girls (2021–2024).

== Early life and education ==
Andria Tayeh was born in Amman, Jordan to a Jordanian mother and a Lebanese father from Zeaitreh. Growing up, Tayeh developed a wide range of interests, including basketball and dance, which she later pursued at a professional level. She pursued a degree in business at the Lebanese American University, located in Beirut.

== Career ==
Tayeh's acting debut came in the television series AlRawabi School for Girls that started in 2021. During her audition, she opened up to director Tima Shomali about her experiences with bullying at school. Shomali, impressed by Tayeh's genuine and emotional performance, decided that Tayeh would be a better fit for the lead role. Tayeh re-auditioned for the role and successfully landed the part. The success of the series led to her becoming an instant star across the Middle East. The series premiered worldwide on Netflix on 21 August 2021. She also starred in the romantic comedy miniseries The Name Doesn't Matter and the German film Mond, directed by Kurdwin Ayub.

In addition to her acting career, Tayeh is a figure in the fashion and beauty industries. She has worked with numerous global brands, becoming the global face of Sephora and the Middle East Ambassador for Armani Beauty. Tayeh was also the first Middle Eastern Ambassador for Kérastase. Her high-profile work includes campaigns for brands like Adidas Originals, Dior, Prada, Miu Miu, Fendi, and Loewe.

== Credits ==
Year	Title	Role	Notes	Ref
2021–2024	AlRawabi School for Girls	Mariam	Miniseries	
2024	Mish Mohem El Esem (The Name Doesn't Matter)	Lara	Miniseries	
2024	Mond (Moon)	Nour	Feature film	
