= AlRawabi School for Girls =

Jordanian streaming television miniseries

- Standard Arabic: مدرسة الروابي للبنات
- Genre: Drama
- Created by: Tima Shomali, Shirin Kamal
- Written by: Tima Shomali; Shirin Kamal; Islam Alshomali
- Directed by: Tima Shomali
- Starring: Andria Tayeh; Rakeen Saad; Noor Taher; Yara Mustafa; Joanna Arida; Thalia El Ansari; Salsabiela; Tara Aboud; Nadera Emran; Reem Saadeh
- Country of origin: Jordan
- Original language: Arabic
- No. of seasons: 2
- No. of episodes: 12

Production
- Producer: Nadine Toukan
- Production location: Amman
- Cinematography: Rachel Aoun; Ahmad Jalboush
- Editors: Eyad Hamam; Ibrahim Taani; Abdallah Sada
- Running time: 45 minutes
- Production company: Filmizion Productions

Original release
- Network: Netflix
- Release: August 12, 2021 – February 15, 2024

AlRawabi School for Girls (Arabic: مدرسة الروابي للبنات) is a Jordanian teen drama television series, created for Netflix by Tima Shomali. The series mainly focuses on the impact of bullying within school systems and societal expectations of young women. The series premiered worldwide on Netflix on 12 August 2021. It is the second Jordanian Netflix original series after Jinn.

In May 2022, the series was renewed for a second season after originally being announced as a miniseries. Filming for the second season concluded in May 2023. The second season premiered on 15 February 2024 on Netflix.

== Plot ==
After a teenager named Mariam is bullied by girls in her elite private school, she plans revenge with her friends. However, her actions have unexpected consequences. The first season focuses on two sets of high school friends to portray different aspects of school that are not commonly talked about. The show reflects and represents patriarchy, corrupt school systems/industries, bullying, mental health issues, religion, sexual assault, reputation and the tradition of honour killings.

In the second season, set in a new school year, most of the characters are new. A girl named Sarah faces similar challenges with bullies and changing friendship groups at AlRawabi. This season delves deeper into themes of cyberbullying, stalking, and the dangers of social media. Each of the episodes in both season ends with a message providing viewers with sources to call for help if they are experiencing the issues discussed in the plot lines, including bullying, eating disorders, and suicidal thoughts. Reviewer Calum Cooper notes that the second season continues the story's thematic richness, but in a complementary vein: “Where season one was a story of how young women in the Arabic region suffer under patriarchy, through loss of morality or straight up murder, season two is an impassioned call for solidarity.”

== Cast ==
=== Main ===
- Andria Tayeh as Mariam (season 1; guest season 2)
- Rakeen Sa'ad as Noaf (season 1; guest season 2)
- Noor Taher as Layan Murad Fathi (season 1; guest season 2)
- Yara Mustafa as Dina (season 1; guest season 2)
- Joanna Arida as Rania (season 1; guest season 2)
- Salsabiela A. as Ruqayya (season 1; guest season 2)
- Tara Abboud as Sarah (season 2)
- Sarah Yousef as Tasneem (season 2)
- Tara Atalla as Nadeen (season 2)
- Kira Yaghnam as Hiba (season 2)
- Thalia Elansari as Shams (season 2)
- Raneem Haitham as Farah (season 2)
- Reem Saadeh as Miss Abeer
- Tima Shomali as Ms Farida

=== Recurring ===
- Nadera Emran as Principal Faten Qadi
- Faris Al Bahri as Ahmad
- Ahmad Hamdan as Laith Radwan
- Sari Silawi as Hazem
- Mohammad Nizar as Omar (season 2)
- Laith Abweh as Ali (season 2)
- Karam Shami as Jawad (season 2)
- Lana Albeik as Rand (season 2)
- Zain Fakhoury as Luma (season 2)

== Episodes ==
Series overview
Series	Episodes	Originally released
1	6	12 August 2021
2	6	15 February 2024

=== Season 1 (2021) ===
No. overall	No. in season	Title	Directed by	Written by	Original release date
1	1	"School Was My Happy Place"	Tima Shomali	Tima Shomali; Shirin Kamal; Islam Alshomali	12 August 2021
The students are interrogated after a violent incident at a top-notch all-girls school, and new pupil Noaf finds herself stuck in a tight spot.
2	2	"Game On!"	Tima Shomali	Tima Shomali; Shirin Kamal; Islam Alshomali	12 August 2021
Vengeful, Mariam returns to school, but her troubles continue, especially when her bestie deserts her. A clash between Noaf and Layan sparks drama.
3	3	"What Goes Around Comes Around"	Tima Shomali	Tima Shomali; Shirin Kamal; Islam Alshomali	12 August 2021
The newly allied Mariam and Noaf set out to take down their first bully at the school's open day. Dina's efforts to fit in lead to a change of heart.
4	4	"Broken Glass"	Tima Shomali	Tima Shomali; Shirin Kamal; Islam Alshomali	12 August 2021
Rania and Layan vow to make whoever was responsible for Ruqayya's scandal pay. In spite of their success, the misfits argue about the next steps.
5	5	"And She Became a Stranger"	Tima Shomali	Tima Shomali; Shirin Kamal; Islam Alshomali	12 August 2021
On an overnight class trip, Layan and Rania make post-curfew plans. In the wake of a traumatic incident, Noaf starts to have second thoughts.
6	6	"The Calm Before the Storm"	Tima Shomali	Tima Shomali; Shirin Kamal; Islam Alshomali	12 August 2021
Emboldened, Mariam is hell-bent on getting back at her last target, despite Noaf and Dina's warnings about the real danger of her actions.

=== Season 2 (2024) ===
No. overall	No. in season	Title	Directed by	Written by	Original release date
1	1	"New Beginnings"	Tima Shomali	Tima Shomali; Shirin Kamal; Islam Alshomali	15 February 2024
It's a new school year, and Sarah dreams of going viral, but her posts aren't getting much traction -- until she posts a video that gets some attention.
2	2	"Fancy Purple"	Tima Shomali	Tima Shomali; Shirin Kamal; Islam Alshomali	15 February 2024
Sarah gets invited to Tasneem's house for a sleepover, but Hiba isn't happy about it. Meanwhile, Nadeen befriends the mysterious Shams.
3	3	"Meet Your Favorite Candidate"	Tima Shomali	Tima Shomali; Shirin Kamal; Islam Alshomali	15 February 2024
Tensions build as the candidates for school president give speeches to their peers. Sarah gets caught in the middle of two competing campaigns.
4	4	"A Blast from the Past"	Tima Shomali	Tima Shomali; Shirin Kamal; Islam Alshomali	15 February 2024
At Omar's birthday party, Sarah is on cloud nine -- until a message from an admirer brings her back down to earth. Hiba gets back at Tasneem.
5	5	"Holy Uniform"	Tima Shomali	Tima Shomali; Shirin Kamal; Islam Alshomali	15 February 2024
When Sarah tries to escape school, an unlikely ally catches wind of her secrets. Meanwhile, Jawad struggles to keep a secret of his own.
6	6	"If I Could Do It All Again..."	Tima Shomali	Tima Shomali; Shirin Kamal; Islam Alshomali	15 February 2024
Nadeen teams up with a past rival for a risky mission to save their friend. Farah chases her dream of performing with Tasneem in front of the school.

== Production ==
=== Development ===
When Tima Shomali developed the idea for AlRawabi School for Girls, she was not thinking about a release on Netflix. According to an interview Shomali gave for Amman TV (and summarized by Al Bawaba) however, "the global streaming platform loved the show and translated it to several languages." Shomali also indicated in the same interview that her goal was to create a dialogue about the concept of bullying, as when she was growing up, the term "was not used, and we did not know what bullying meant, but we lived through it and did not know about it." Shomali also commented on her intent to introduce women's voices the "one thing I always found lacking in most shows that talk about women is the female perception on their issues. So I gathered around a brilliant team of women to work on developing and executing the show's creative vision. Together, we envisioned and built the elements of the Al Rawabi world, starting from the characters, set design, colors, lighting and even the music." Later, on 13 April 2019, Shomali announced to her followers on Facebook that she was working on creating an original Arabic Netflix series, in collaboration with her Jordanian production company Filmizion Productions, titled AlRawabi School for Girls. On 18 May 2022, Tima Shomali, Netflix MENA and the cast announced a season two to AlRawabi, despite the fact it was supposed to be a mini/limited series. She shared 3 photos via Instagram. Filming wrapped in May 2023.

=== Casting ===
Working alongside the writer Shirin Kamal, Tima Shomali created a full female cast drama series, that takes place in an all girls school and explores the ideas of revenge and bullying. They cast "new faces", and allowed the actors to choose the characters that they wanted to portray.

== Release ==
=== Response ===
According to Jordanian psychologist Samira H., AlRawabi School for Girls "depicts the significant impact of bullying on the mental health of young girls." She also states that she hopes "stories like the one portrayed in the series encourages parents and schools to be more sympathetic with those who are bullied so that they don't feel so alone." AlRawabi also created controversy, as many thought it was an inaccurate representation of Jordan, their culture, lifestyle and society, along with Arabs as a whole. People have also criticized AlRawabi for some of the topics mentioned in the show. However, many loved this show. On social media, many praised the show for openly portraying topics which don't often get talked about. Many have also praised the show for portraying young/teenaged Arab girls.

== See also ==
- Jinn
- Mean Girls
- A Silent Voice
- Boys Over Flowers
- Cobra Kai
- Elite
- Heathers
- Odd Girl Out
- Waterloo Road
