= Ali Maher =

Ali Maher may refer to:

- Ali Mahir Pasha (1882–1960), former prime minister of Egypt
- Ali Maher (diplomat) (born 1939), Egyptian diplomat and intellectual figure
- Ali Maher (footballer) (born 1973), Egyptian football striker
- Ali Maher (artist/architect) (1958–2013), Jordanian artist
