= Amira (film) =

2021 Egyptian film

- Promotional release poster
- Directed by: Mohamed Diab
- Written by: Mohamed Diab; Khaled Diab; Sherine Diab
- Produced by: Hany Abu-Assad; Amira Diab; Sarah Goher; Mohamed Hefzy; Eric Lagesse; Moez Masoud; Rula Nasser; Daniel Ziskind
- Starring: Tara Abboud; Saba Mubarak; Ali Suliman
- Cinematography: Ahmed Gabr
- Edited by: Ahmed Hafez
- Music by: Khaled Dagher
- Production companies: Arab Media Network; Film-Clinic; Lagoonie Film Production; MAD Solutions; The Imaginarium
- Distributed by: MAD Solutions
- Release date: 3 September 2021 (Venice)
- Running time: 96 minutes
- Countries: Egypt; Jordan; UAE
- Language: Arabic

Amira (Arabic: أميرة, romanized: ʾAmīra) is a 2021 drama film directed by Mohamed Diab, in his first film set in Palestine. It was co-written by Diab, Khaled Diab and Sherine Diab. The film stars Tara Abboud in the title role, a 17-year-old Palestinian, who is told that she was conceived by her mother Warda (Saba Mubarak) with the smuggled sperm of her imprisoned father, Nawar (Ali Suliman).

The film had its world premiere in the Orizzonti section of the 78th Venice International Film Festival on 3 September 2021. It was selected as the Jordanian entry for the Best International Feature Film at the 94th Academy Awards, but it was withdrawn by the Royal Film Commission due to controversy surrounding the film's subject matter. The film was criticized by prisoners' rights organizations and withdrawn "out of respect to the feelings of the prisoners and their families".

== Plot ==
Amira, a 17-year-old Palestinian, is told that she was conceived with the smuggled sperm of her imprisoned father, Nawar. However, during another attempt of impregnating his wife Warda through smuggled sperm, the family discovers that Nawar is actually sterile. Amira's biological father was in fact an Israeli prison guard.

== Cast ==
- Tara Abboud as Amira
- Saba Mubarak as Warda
- Ali Suliman as Nawar
- Suhaib Nashwan as Ziad
- Ziad Bakri as Basel
- Waleed Zuaiter as Said
- Sameera Asir as Reema
- Saleh Bakri as Etai
- Reem Talhami as Grandmother
- Is'haq Elias as Suleiman
- Kais Nashef as Hani
- Mohammad Ghassan as Yaser
- Assaf al Rousan as Doctor #3
- Nadeem Rimawi as Soldier

== Release ==
The film had its world premiere in the Orizzonti section of the 78th Venice International Film Festival on 3 September 2021. At the festival, the film won two awards: the Lanterna Magica Award and the Interfilm Award. In August, the film was selected to compete at the Feature Narrative Competition in the fifth edition of Egypt's El Gouna Film Festival (GFF), which marked its first Arab world premiere.

== See also ==
- List of submissions to the 94th Academy Awards for Best International Feature Film
- List of Jordanian submissions for the Academy Award for Best International Feature Film
