= Sink (film) =

2025 drama film

- International promotional poster
- Arabic: غرق
- Directed by: Zain Duraie
- Written by: Zain Duraie
- Produced by: Alaa Alasad; Hind Anabtawi; Peter Williams
- Starring: Clara Khoury; Mohammed Nizar; Wissam Tobeileh
- Cinematography: Farouk Laaridh
- Edited by: Abdallah Sada
- Music by: Ted Regklis
- Production companies: Tabi360; Jordan Pioneers; Creative Media Solutions
- Release date: 7 September 2025 (TIFF)
- Running time: 88 minutes
- Countries: Jordan; Saudi Arabia; Qatar; France
- Language: Arabic

Sink (Arabic: غرق) is a 2025 drama film written and directed by Zain Duraie. A co-production of Jordan, Saudi Arabia, Qatar, and France, it stars Clara Khoury, Mohammed Nizar and Wissam Tobeileh.

The film had its world premiere at the 2025 Toronto International Film Festival on 7 September. It was also selected as the Jordanian entry for the Best International Feature Film at the 99th Academy Awards.

== Premise ==
A mother refuses to accept her son's deteriorating mental health, clinging to the belief he only needs direction, as crisis awaits.

== Cast ==
- Clara Khoury as Nadia
- Mohammed Nizar as Basil
- Wissam Tobeileh

== Production ==
In December 2022, it was announced Zain Duraie would direct the film, receiving support from The Royal Film Commission - Jordan and Malmö Arab Film Fund. It additionally received support from Arab Fund for Arts and Culture and Doha Film Institute. Principal photography concluded by November 2024.

== Release ==
The film had its world premiered in the Discovery section of the Toronto International Film Festival in 2025, where it was the only Arab film in the section. It later had its European premiere in competition at the BFI London Film Festival as the only Arab film in the First Feature Competition for the Sutherland Award. The film went on to travel internationally and was picked up for sales by Metfilm Studio in the UK which is known for its curative and selective line up, since then the film has been sold to major territories including North America and the United kingdom.

== Accolades ==
Year	Award	Category	Recipient(s)	Result	Ref.
2025	International Filmfestival Mannheim-Heidelberg	Ecumenical Jury Award	Sink	Won	
2025	Carthage Film Festival	Bronze Tanit	Sink	Won	
2025	BFI London Film Festival	First Feature Competition	Zain Duraie	Nominated	

== See also ==
- List of submissions to the 99th Academy Awards for Best International Feature Film
- List of Jordanian submissions for the Academy Award for Best International Feature Film
