= Moon (2024 film) =

2024 film by Kurdwin Ayub

- International promotional poster
- German: Mond
- Directed by: Kurdwin Ayub
- Written by: Kurdwin Ayub
- Produced by: Bruno Wagner; Veronika Franz
- Starring: Florentina Holzinger; Andria Tayeh; Celina Antwan; Nagham Abu Baker; Omar Almajali
- Cinematography: Klemens Hufnagl
- Edited by: Roland Stöttinger
- Music by: Anthea Schranz
- Production company: Ulrich Seidl Filmproduktion
- Distributed by: Bendita Film Sales
- Release dates: 11 August 2024 (Locarno); 31 October 2024 (Austria)
- Running time: 92 minutes
- Country: Austria
- Languages: English; German; Arabic

Moon (German: Mond), is a 2024 Austrian thriller drama film written and directed by Kurdwin Ayub. Starring Florentina Holzinger, Andria Tayeh, Celina Antwan, Nagham Abu Baker and Omar Almajali. It follows Sarah (Holzinger), a former martial arts athlete, hired by a wealthy Jordanian family to train their daughters.

The film had its world premiere at the main competition of the 77th Locarno Film Festival on 11 August 2024, where it won the Special Jury Prize. It was theatrically released in Austria on 31 October.

== Cast ==
- Florentina Holzinger as Sarah
- Andria Tayeh as Nour
- Celina Antwan as Fatima
- Nagham Abu Baker as Shaima
- Omar Almajali as Abdul

== Production ==
Originally, Ayub wanted to shoot in Iraq but found it too unsafe of a working environment for cast and crew. Instead, most of principal photography was in Jordan. Ayub reported difficulties casting girls and women because "every time when we told them that we wanted them for the film, they ghosted us," later finding out that it was due to a lack of parent permission.

== Critical reception ==
The Guardian and Film Review gave the film three out of five stars. International Cinephile Society gave it three and a half stars out of five.

Variety found some of the film "a bit clunky" but lauded the relationship between the women depicted.

Arab News wrote that "Unfortunately, there are pitfalls in the narrative with some of the protagonist’s actions going unexplained but what keeps the work flowing is the beautiful relationship among the sisters and how they ultimately come to trust their trainer."
