= Isaac (film) =

2019 film

Isaac (Lithuanian: Izaokas) is the first feature film by Lithuanian director Jurgis Matulevičius. It is the first feature film that deals with the participation of Lithuanians in the killing of Jews during the Holocaust. The drama is based on the last novel of the same name by Antanas Škėma before his death in 1961. It was selected as the Lithuanian entry for the Best International Feature Film at the 94th Academy Awards.

== Premise ==
Isaac is drama about a Lithuanian activist haunted by the guilt of killing a Jew in the Lietūkis garage massacre in June 1941.

== Production ==
Antanas Škėma wrote the novel in 1960–1961, but it attracted little attention. It was first published in a volume of his collected works in 1985. It was republished as a separate work in 2018.

The film was made in Lithuania by the Film Jam production company. The filming took place in Vilnius, Kaunas, and Klaipėda and lasted about two and a half years.

Its world premiere happened in November 2019 at the Tallinn Black Nights Film Festival. In 2020, it was nominated for the Discovery prize at the European Film Awards.

In 2020, it was shown at the Glasgow Film Festival, at the Riviera International Film Festival and at Eastern European Film Festival Cottbus (Germany). In October 2020, Isaac was also named second best film and Matulevičius was selected best second best director at the 19th Imagineindia International Film Festival in Spain.

== Critical response ==
Lithuanian National Radio and Television said that the film was "the most surprising" at the Tallinn Black Nights Film Festival and praised the film for its anti-war message.

Stephen Dalton writing for the Hollywood Reporter noted that such a confident and sophisticated work deserved a wider audience beyond the usual niche demographic for subtitled art house fare".

== See also ==
- List of submissions to the 94th Academy Awards for Best International Feature Film
- List of Lithuanian submissions for the Academy Award for Best International Feature Film
