= Beik =

Beik may refer to:

- Myeik, Burma: Beik is the vernacular Burmese pronunciation
- Beik Baghi, a village in Ardabil Province, Iran
- Bey, a Turkish name for chieftains or leaders of small tribal groups

Surname

- Kamal Kheir Beik (1935–1980), Syrian poet and dissident
- Lana Albeik (born 1995), Palestinian-Syrian model and actress
