= Tara Abboud =

Jordanian actress (born 1997)

- تارا عبود
- Born: January 28, 2001 (age 25); Amman, Jordan
- Occupation: Actress
- Years active: 2021–present

Tara Abboud (Arabic: تارا عبود; born 28 January 2001), is a Palestinian–Jordanian actress. Her films include Amira (2021). On television, she is known for her roles in the Star series Culprits (2023) and the Netflix teen drama AlRawabi School for Girls (2024).

== Early life ==
Tara Abboud was born in 2001 in Amman, Jordan.

== Career ==
Abboud was a child actress, starting at ten years-old with short films, such as Motaz Matar's film From Behind The Door and Tima Shomali’s Log In. She had a leading role in Amjad Al-Rasheed’s 2009 film Princess Of The Mountains.

Abboud had a lead role in the Jordanian television series Oboor in 2019, appearing alongside Saba Mubarak. Abboud was named one of Screen International’s Arab Stars of Tomorrow in 2020.

Abboud appeared as the eponymous Amira in the 2021 Mohamed Diab film Amira. The film won the Lanterna Magica Award and the Interfilm Award at the 78th Venice International Film Festival. It was selected as Jordan’s entry for the Academy Awards but was withdrawn by the Jordanian Royal Film Commission after backlash to the films controversial storyline, in which Abboud’s Palestinian character Amira discovers she was conceived by smuggled sperm from an Israeli prisoner guard rather than her imprisoned Palestinian father. She played Noor in the 2022 film Rebel which had its world premiere during the 75th edition of the Cannes Film Festival.

In 2023 Abboud appeared in the Disney+ Star original series Culprits with an ensemble cast including Gemma Arterton, Eddie Izzard, Kirby Howell-Baptiste, Kevin Vidal, and Niamh Algar. In 2026, she co-starred in two Egyptian television miniseries; Fakhr El-Delta and Sohab El Ard, marking her debut in Egyptian Television.

== Filmography ==
Film
Year	Title	Role	Notes	Ref.
2021	Amira	Amira		
2022	Rebel	Noor		

Television
Year	Title	Role	Notes	Ref.
2019	Oboor			
2023	Culprits	Azar Mizouni	Recurring role	
2024	AlRawabi School for Girls	Sarah	Main role (season 2)	
2026	Sohab El Ard	Karma		
