= The Arab-Hebrew Theater =

Arab and Hebrew theatre in Tel Aviv

Coordinates: 32°03′18″N 34°45′16″E

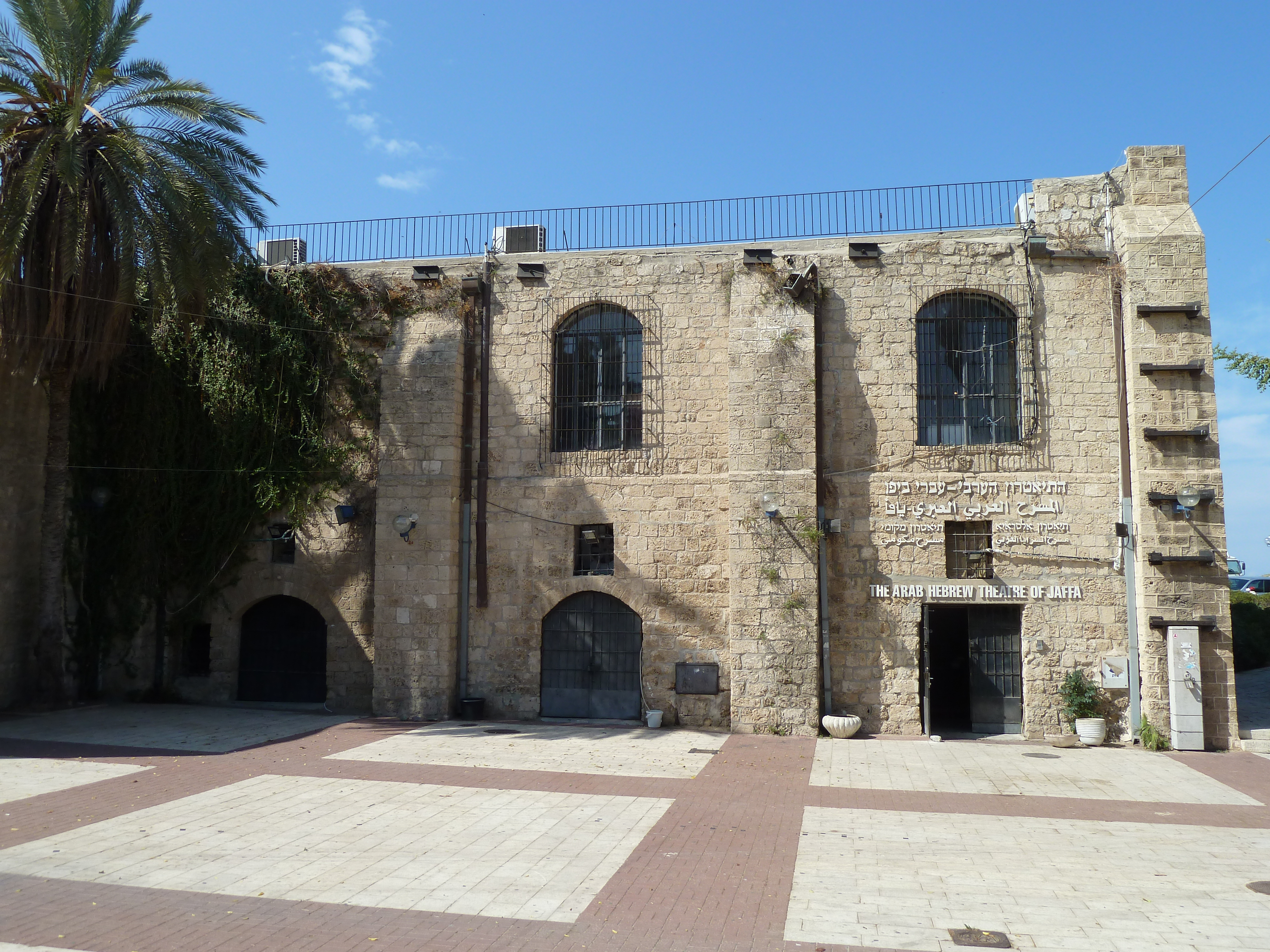
The theater building in Jaffa

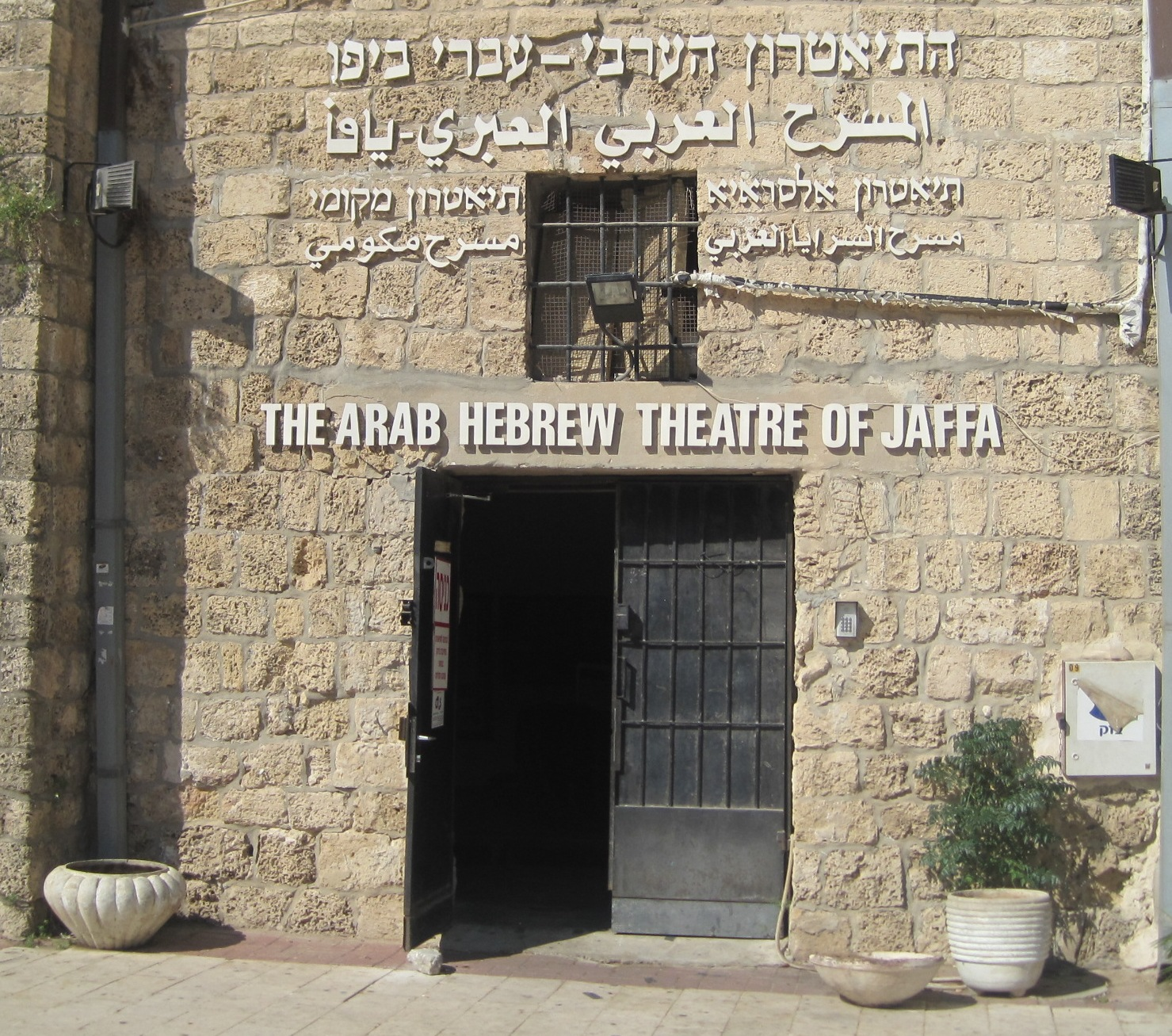
The entrance to the theater

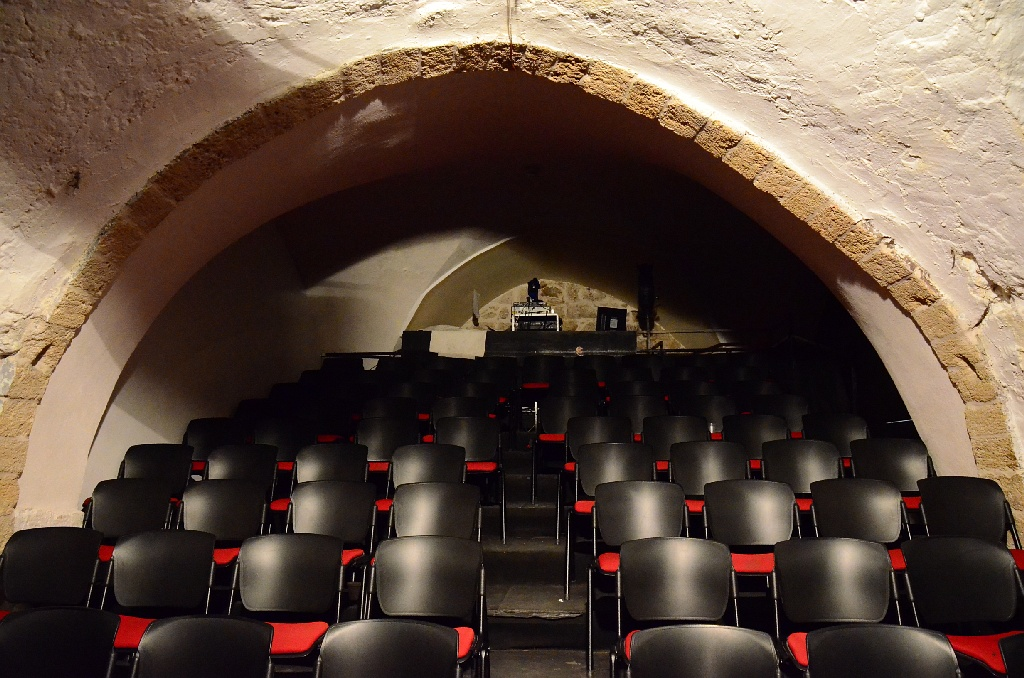
The interior of the theater

The Arab-Hebrew Theater or Al Saraya Theater is a multilingual theater located in the Old Saraya House in the Old City of Jaffa. It serves as a stage for two theater companies working independently and together in two languages: Hebrew and Arabic. The Hebrew company is "Teatron Mekomi (Local Theater)", which was established in 1990 by Yigal Ezrati and Gabi Eldor, and the Arab company is "Al-Saraya", which was established in 1998. The theater is partially funded by the Ministry of Culture and the Tel Aviv Municipality. The theater has three arts directors: Mohammad Bakri, Yigal Ezrati, and Gabi Eldor.

== One stage, two companies ==
The Arab-Hebrew Theater in Jaffa was established in 1998. The theater's purpose is to bring the two unique and conflict-troubled cultures together under the same roof through theater. The building was given to the two companies by the Tel Aviv Municipality. It underwent significant renovations due to the building's advanced age, as well as its need for preservation and remodeling to suit a theater. The arts director of the Arab company is Adib Jahshan. Both companies conduct plays in Hebrew and Arabic together and independently. The theater provides opportunities for both groups to express their ethnic differences artistically on the same stage. From time to time, the two come together in order to discuss certain topics, but each company is self-managed.

The theater is funded by the Tel Aviv Municipality and the Ministry of Culture, thanks to the belief that a unique theater that integrates ethnicities and communities is meaningful and important despite any financial difficulties.

== Productions ==
- The Orphans of Jaffa, produced by Yigal Ezrati
- Tonight We Dance Again, produced by Yigal Ezrati, Gabi Eldor
- Political Murder, produced by Yigal Ezrati
- The Reconciliation and Truth Committee, produced by Yigal Ezrati
- Double Lonliness, a joint production of Teatron Mekomi and Al-Saraya Theater, Hebrew-Arabic poetry, directed and edited by Professor Shim'on Levi
- Akh Akh Boom Trakh, directed by Norman Issa

== Unity of opposites ==
The theater is known to be self-contradicting in several respects, for example, in its new and old ways of processing texts, its Arab and Jewish identities, its young and old actors, and its fusion between fringe, modern and traditional theater (e.g. Shakespeare). The theater has hosted several shows and events, including the international poetry festival Sha'ar, produced by the Helicon Foundation. From 2004 until 2008 Hanoch Levin's play, You, Me, and the Next War, featured pianist Bart Berman, along with the original crew that performed in the production's 1968 premier.

== Political censorship ==
When the film Farha directed by Jordanian filmmaker Darin Sallam was released, Al Saraya Theater scheduled screenings. In response, Avigdor Lieberman, the Israeli Finance Minister, ordered the treasury to withdraw government funding from the theater.
