= Captain Abu Raed =

- Film poster
- Directed by: Amin Matalqa
- Written by: Amin Matalqa
- Produced by: Kenneth Kokin; Isam Salfiti; Aida Jabaji Matalqa; Nadine Toukan; Laith Majali; David Pritchard
- Starring: Nadim Sawalha; Rana Sultan
- Music by: Austin Wintory
- Release dates: 11 December 2007 (Dubai International Film Festival); 6 February 2008
- Running time: 102 minutes
- Country: Jordan
- Language: Arabic

Captain Abu Raed (Arabic: كابتن أبو رائد) is a 2007 Jordanian film directed and written by Amin Matalqa. It is the first feature film produced in Jordan in more than 50 years. The Royal Film Commission of Jordan endorsed Captain Abu Raed to be submitted to the 81st Academy Awards for Best Foreign Language Film, the first ever submitted by Jordan. The film won awards at numerous film festivals including the Sundance Film Festival, Heartland Film Festival, and the Dubai International Film Festival. It was screened at the Jerusalem International Film Festival in 2008.

== Plot ==
Abu Raed is an airport janitor at the Queen Alia International Airport in Amman. After finding a Royal Jordanian captain's hat in the trash, the neighborhood children mistake him for an airline pilot and beg him to tell them stories of his adventures. At first refusing, he later concedes and tells them about his fictional travels to England, France, and New York, earning the name "Captain Abu Raed".

An older child, Murad, knows who Abu Raed really is and sets out to prove the other children wrong, repeating the phrase "People like us don't grow up to be pilots." With some dinars he found, Murad takes the other children on a taxi ride to the airport to show them the truth about Abu Raed. The children are heartbroken at seeing their idol on his hands and knees, scrubbing the floor.

It is later shown that Murad had stolen the money from his father Abu Murad, who, drunk after a hard day selling women's clothing on the street, often abused Murad's mother, Um Murad. Abu Murad was exceptionally mad about the loss of money and took it out on his wife.

Meanwhile, at the airport and on the bus home, Abu Raed gets to know Nour, a female pilot whose wealthy father repeatedly attempts to find her a husband. During a friendly visit to his home, he tells her about his past, including a deceased wife and son, Raed.

Abu Raed also has to deal with Tareq, one of the children who he told stories to, whose father had him selling wafers on the street rather than going to school. Abu Raed knew he was a smart boy so he bought all of his wafers so Tareq could attend school. However, this was a mixed blessing as Abu Tareq would then give Tareq more wafers to sell, thinking he was a good salesman.

Abu Raed, after being exposed as a phony, forgave Murad and gave him the pilot hat as a token of forgiveness. Later, Murad steals a model airplane from a travel agency and gets his hand burned by his father for it. Abu Raed is there to comfort him, creating a bond between the two. This event convinces Abu Raed to find a way to bring Murad, his younger brother, and his mother to safety.

After Abu Raed treats Murad's burns one night, Murad leaves, and so does Abu Raed. On his way home, he finds an intoxicated Abu Murad lying in the street, who tells Abu Raed to 'shut up'. Abu Raed lifts up a heavy stone, considering ending the misery Abu Murad caused himself and his family. However, he is overcome by his feelings and leaves him unharmed.

One night, before Abu Murad gets home, Abu Raed develops a plan to protect Murad and his family. Nour volunteers to take them in, because her wealthy family owns a large house. She brings her car to the area where Abu Raed and the Murads live, and they hurriedly pack the belongings of the Murad family. As they are about to leave, Murad runs back to retrieve the pilot's cap, a symbol of his dreams and aspirations. Nour then sets off with the family for her house, as Tareq appears and asks what is going on, to which Abu Raed replies, "Nothing." Tareq becomes the last person, other than a drunk Abu Murad, to see Abu Raed alive.

Despite repeated warnings from Um Murad that "He's going to kill you", Abu Raed sits in the Murad apartment and awaits Abu Murad's return. Upon finding his home empty, Abu Murad threatens Abu Raed's life if he doesn't tell where the family went. Abu Raed is implied to have been killed in the apartment. Years later, a grown-up Murad is seen watching the airfield as a Royal Jordanian pilot.

== Setting ==
Many of the movie's open scenes are set on the well-known Roman ruins high above Amman, on Jabal al-Qal'a. The "Making of Captain Abu Raed" on the Western release of the DVD points out that although the movie takes place entirely in Amman and the airport, the neighborhood surrounding Abu Raed's home was shot in the neighboring old city of Salt.

Although the date of the movie is never specified by any notes or characters, the usage of the Eastern Arabic numerals on vehicles' license plates implies that the movie takes place in the past, as a recollection from youth by the adult Captain Murad. Jordan switched from the Eastern Arabic numeral system to standard Arabic numerals in the 1990s.

== Cast ==
- Nadim Sawalha – Abu Raed
- Rami Samara – https://www.imdb.com/name/nm2698943/
- Rana Sultan – Nour
- Hussein Al-Sous – Murad
- Udey Al-Qiddissi – Tareq
- Ghandi Saber – Abu Murad
- Dina Ra'ad-Yaghnam – Um Murad

== Awards ==
Won

- 2007 Dubai International Film Festival
  - Muhr Award – Best Actor: Nadim Sawalha
- 2008 Durban International Film Festival
  - Best First Feature Film
- 2008 Heartland Film Festival
  - Crystal Heart Award – Feature Film
  - Grand Prize for Dramatic Feature
- 2008 Newport Beach Film Festival
  - Jury Award – Best Actor – Nadim Sawalha
  - Jury Award – Best Actress – Rana Sultan
- 2008 Seattle International Film Festival
  - Best Director Golden Space Needle Award – Amin Matalqa
- 2008 Sundance Film Festival
  - Audience Award – World Cinema – Dramatic
- 9th AARP Movies for Grownups Awards
  - Best Foreign Film

Nominated

- 2008 Sundance Film Festival
  - Grand Jury Prize – World Cinema – Dramatic

== See also ==
- Cinema of Jordan
- List of Jordanian submissions for the Academy Award for Best Foreign Language Film
