= Tima Shomali =

Jordanian producer, director, writer, and comedy actress

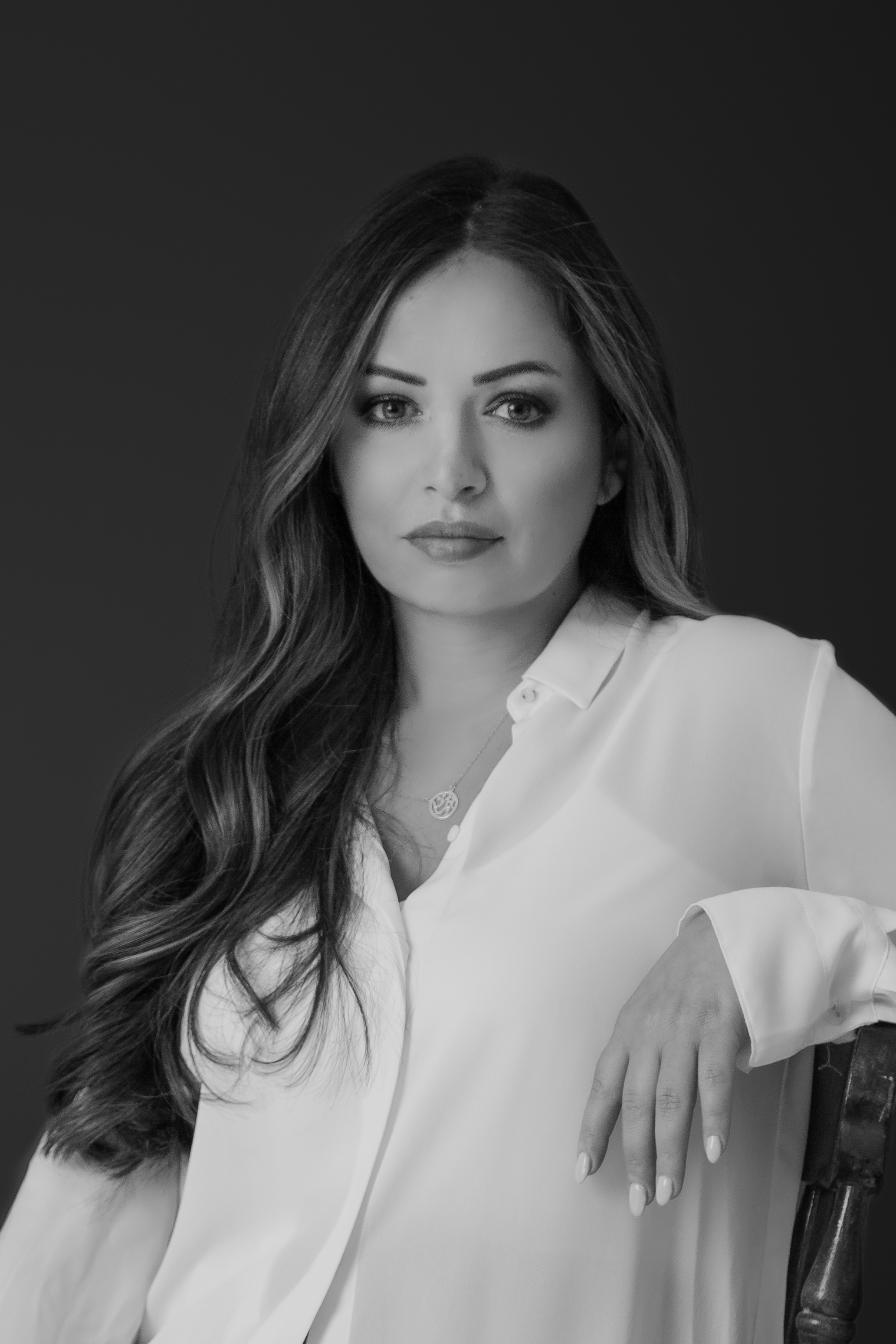
- Tima Shomali in 2024
- Born: March 7, 1985 (age 41); Amman, Jordan
- Education: University of Jordan (B.A.); Red Sea Institute of Cinematic Arts (MFA)
- Occupations: director and actress
- Years active: 2011–present
- Known for: AlRawabi School for Girls

Tima Shomali (Arabic: تيما الشوملي, born March 7, 1985) is a Jordanian director, producer, writer, and actress, and the founder of Filmizion Productions. Zainab Salbi called her "Tina Fey of the Arab world" during an interview with the young actress, in New York at the Woman in the World Summit. After earning an MFA degree in producing and screenwriting at RSICA, Shomali joined the YouTube show Bath Bayakha, where she was first recognized for her work as a writer and actress. Later in 2012, she founded her own production company which she called Filmizion Productions, and through the company, she created and starred in her first Web series titled Femaleshow. The show attracted millions of viewers from across the region online, which led to it being aired on different TV stations around the region. Becky Anderson described her as a national phenomena in a CNN interview with the young filmmaker.

Her 2021 streaming media release on Netflix, AlRawabi School for Girls, is the second original Arabic Netflix series.

== Education ==
Shomali graduated from the University of Jordan with a BA in Business Administration and Finance, since none of the universities in Jordan at the time were offering film courses. However, after she earned her BA degree, she started participating in workshops and seminars offered by the Jordanian Royal Film Commission. After making her first short film, she applied to an MFA program at Red Sea Institute of Cinematic Arts (RSICA) that started operating in Aqaba in 2008. She graduated with an MFA in screenwriting and producing.

== Career ==
After graduating from RSICA, Shomali made her debut as a comedy writer and lead actress in the local online comedy show Bath Bayakha. The show gained 11 million viewers on YouTube and became a huge success in the region. Shomali's success in Bath Bayakha led her to start her own production company in 2012 called Filmizion Productions. She created her own online show, which she titled Femaleshow. It started off as a show that conducted social experiments in the streets of Amman, which then Shomali would comment on through comedic monologues and skits that she wrote herself. Without attempting to change the stereotype that exists in the Arab world that claims women are not funny, Shomali became one of the most well known comedian actors in Jordan.

Later, Shomali transformed Femaleshow into a fictional romantic comedy series about a couple's life through dating, engagement, marriage and pregnancy from a woman's point of view. The show attracted more than 25 million viewers, and was rated as one of the top five web series to watch in the Arab region. Shomali wanted to make Femaleshow relatable, and wanted to use it to tackle issues in Jordanian society, without speaking about the problems directly. She made her content comedic and relatable so she could place emphasis on the reality that women and Arabs in general are a part of, and change the stereotypes that exists about Arabs in the world at large. Shomali became one of the most familiar faces in the industry, and was titled one of the "100 Under 40: The World’s Most Influential Young Arabs". Shomali gained thousands of followers on her social media pages (Facebook, Instagram, and Twitter) and all her social media accounts were verified. She uses her social media influence to promote causes that she believes in, such as humans right to education, women empowerment, and youth empowerment.

In 2015, Shomali went behind the camera. She started by producing a TV series titled Zain alongside Saba Mubarak. After that she worked alongside Zainab Salbi on her show Nida'a as the supervising producer. She was invited as a guest on one of the episodes of Nida'a to discuss the nature of relationships and marriage in the Arab world openly. Shomali went back in front of the camera when she hosted an entertainment chat show in the UAE called Dardachat that was aired on Al-Emarat Channel. As her career moved forward in 2017, Shomali was featured in Netflix's campaign “She Rules", by creating a short video that challenges the stereotypes that Arab women and women around the globe are constantly being associated with. In 2018, Shomali hosted Sadeem, a reality show that brings in young contestants together to compete for the title of the next digital superstar.

On April 13, 2019, Shomali announced to her followers on Facebook that she is working on creating an original Arabic Netflix series, in collaboration with her Jordanian production company Filmizion Productions, titled AlRawabi School for Girls. The film was released in 2021 on Netflix. As the show runner, writer, and director of the second original Arabic Netflix series ever, Shomali wanted to tell a story about women in the region. Working alongside the writer Shirin Kamal, the two writers created a full female cast drama series, that takes place in an all girls school and explores the ideas of revenge and bullying. The story is about a girl who gets bullied by other girls in her school, and decides to take matters into her hands in order to get revenge. When asked about the show, Director of International Originals at Netflix Simran Sethi said:

“We are extremely proud to partner with Tima again to produce what is essentially the first Middle Eastern young adult series that celebrates the role of women, not only on screen, but behind the scenes as well. The story brings a fresh perspective to Middle Eastern content, and we are absolutely excited to shareAl Rawabi School for Girls with our global audiences in over 190 countries.”

Shomali's first project with Netflix was “She Rules” campaign. The campaign's main goal was to celebrate women on and off screen in the television industry. When asked about the show she commented:

“AlRawabi School for Girls is a very dear project to my heart. It depicts the stories and struggles of young Arab women in a light that we hadn't yet seen before in the region, particularly with this age group. It's a show that stems from the eyes of women about women and I am really pleased to collaborate with Netflix and have the opportunity to tell the stories of young women in our region on such a global platform.”
