= Two Lions to Venice =

2021 film

- Theatrical release poster
- Directed by: Jonid Jorgji
- Written by: Jonid Jorgji
- Produced by: Elkjana Gjipali; Jonid Jorgji
- Starring: Natalia De Maria
- Cinematography: Petros Antoniadis
- Release date: 8 June 2021
- Running time: 95 minutes
- Countries: Albania; Czech Republic; Italy; United Kingdom
- Languages: Albanian; Italian

Two Lions to Venice (Albanian: Luanët Drejt Venecias) is a 2021 Albanian comedy drama film directed and written by Jonid Jorgji. It was Albania's submission for the Academy Award for Best International Feature Film at the 94th Academy Awards, but it was not one of the finalists.

== Plot ==
Kaci and Vani, two old Albanian filmmakers, are on their way to the Venice Film Festival, where Vani is set to give a speech. On the way they meet Lola and Irina, two porn stars that are dressed as nuns. Vani meets his daughter in Italy and learns that she is a porn actress after thinking that she was at college.

== Cast ==
- Natalia De Maria as Lola
- Kastriot Çaushi as Kaçi
- Vasjan Lami as Vani
- Alessandra Bonarotta as Ginevra

== Production ==
Produced by companies from Albania, Italy, United Kingdom, Greece, and the Czech Republic, Two Lions to Venice was written and directed by Jonid Jorgji. The film was dedicated to Jorgji's mentor Gjergj Xhuvani, who died in 2019. Financial support was provided by Qendra Kinematografike e Kosovës.

Filming took place over the course of 20 days in Albania and Venice. As a result of the COVID-19 pandemic, scenes that were meant to be shot in Italy were instead shot outside of Tirana. The cinematography was done by Petros Antoniadis.

== Release ==
Two Lions to Venice premiered on 8 June 2021. Albania selected Two Lions to Venice as its nominee for the Academy Award for Best International Feature Film at the 94th Academy Awards, but it was not one of the finalists. Freestyle to Montenegro by Ardit Sadiku was the only other possible nominee. Kastriot Çaushi, who starred in the film, was a member of the committee that selected Albania's Oscar submission, but declined to vote citing his conflict of interest.

== See also ==
- List of submissions to the 94th Academy Awards for Best International Feature Film
- List of Albanian submissions for the Academy Award for Best International Feature Film

== Works cited ==
=== News ===
- "Filmi "Dy Luanë drejt Venecias", kandidatura e Shqipërisë për "Oscar"". Gazeta Si. 25 September 2021. Archived from the original on 10 April 2025.
- "Filmi "Dy Luanë drejt Venecias", me regji nga Jonid Jorgji kandidatura e Shqipërisë për "Oscar"". Gazeta Sot. 25 September 2021. Archived from the original on 10 April 2025.
- "Jonid Jorgji me filmin e ri në kinema "Dy luanë drejt Venecias". Jeta mes kinemasë, medias dhe biznesit". Business Magazine Albania. 21 May 2021. Archived from the original on 22 May 2021.
- Hoxhaj, Gili (7 January 2022). ""Two lions towards Venice" with the controversial world in Pristina as well". Koha Ditore. Archived from the original on 10 April 2025.
- Saracini, Klotilda (15 April 2022). "Filmi shqiptar "Dy Luanë drejt Venecias", shfaqet në Pragë". Albanian Telegraphic Agency.
- Velija, Kreizia (4 June 2021). "Regjisori Jonid Jorgji çon "Dy luanë drejt Venecias"!". Top Radio. Archived from the original on 10 April 2025.

=== Web ===
- "Two Lions Heading to Venice". Cineuropa. Archived from the original on 10 April 2025.
