= Culprits (TV series) =

2023 heist television series

- Genre: Crime thriller; Heist
- Created by: J Blakeson
- Based on: Culprits: The Heist Was Just the Beginning edited by Richard Brewer and Gary Phillips
- Written by: J Blakeson
- Directed by: J Blakeson; Claire Oakley
- Starring: Nathan Stewart-Jarrett; Gemma Arterton; Eddie Izzard; Kirby Howell-Baptiste; Niamh Algar; Kamel El Basha; Tara Abboud; Ned Dennehy; Kevin Vidal
- Composer: Marc Canham
- Country of origin: United Kingdom
- Original language: English
- No. of episodes: 8

Production
- Executive producers: Stephen Garrett; J Blakeson
- Producer: Morenike Williams
- Cinematography: Philipp Blaubach; Anna Valdez-Hanks
- Production company: Character 7

Original release
- Network: Disney+
- Release: 8 November 2023

Culprits is a British heist television series created by J Blakeson. The series premiered on Star via Disney+ on 8 November 2023 in several countries around the world as a Star Original.

== Premise ==
After a high-stakes heist, a team of elite criminals go their separate ways and try to leave their old lives behind, but the past and present collide when a ruthless assassin starts targeting them one by one.

== Cast and characters ==
=== The heist crew ===
- Nathan Stewart-Jarrett as Joe Petrus / David Marking / Muscle, a former bodyguard
- Gemma Arterton as Dianne Harewood / Brain, a criminal mastermind
- Kirby as Officer, a con artist
- Niamh Algar as Inga Beatrice / Specialist / Psycho, an assassin
- Kamel El Basha as Youssef Mizouni / Cracker, a safe-cracker
- Tara Abboud as Azar Mizouni / Greaseman, Youssef's granddaughter and protégé
- Karl Collins as Fixer, Dianne's trusted associate
- Vincent Riotta as Marcello Bari / Driver, a former stunt driver
- Amara Karan as Doctor, a medical professional
- Tom Mothersdale as Anton Irving / Right Hand, a former military man and a longtime accomplice of Dianne
- Mark Field as Robert Yates / Fuse, an explosives expert
- Laura Morgan as Soldier

=== Other recurring characters ===
- Ned Dennehy as Devil, an assassin
- Kevin Vidal as Jules, Joe's fiancé
- Maria Nash as Frankie, Jules' daughter
- Baeyen Hoffman as Bud, Jules' son
- Eddie Izzard as Vincent Hawkes, a billionaire businessman
- Juliet Cowan as Marian / The Intermediary, Hawkes' employee
- Morgan Kelly as Kyle Bedrosian, a developer and councilman
- Uriel Emil as Malek Mizouni, Youssef's son and Azar's father
- Nathan Welsh as Colin Burnham, Joe's ex-partner

== Episodes ==
No.	Title	Directed by	Written by	Original release date
1	"Change of Use"	J Blakeson	J Blakeson	8 November 2023 (Note: The series had its world premiere on Saturday 7th October at the 67th BFI London Film Festival.)
Joe is a family man living the American dream with his fiancé and stepchildren. However, unbeknown to his family, Joe was involved in a mysterious crime 3 years earlier and his past is about to catch up with him.
2	"Angler Fish"	J Blakeson	J Blakeson	8 November 2023
Joe takes matters into his own hands, but realises that someone is following him. Three years earlier, the gang steals plans for a bank vault, and the arrival of a new, extremely violent member sends shock waves through the group.
3	"Pflegedienstleitung"	J Blakeson	J Blakeson	8 November 2023
Specialist lives her life in a remote wilderness, but she receives an unexpected visitor. Joe breaks protocol as he contacts a member of the gang and embarks on a mission to neutralise the looming threat.
4	"Circle in a Circle"	J Blakeson	Alex Straker	8 November 2023
Joe, Specialist, and Officer try to work out who is trying to kill them and why. When Specialist disappears, Joe and Officer travel to France in the hope of finding Youssef and Azar before the killer does.
5	"Let Us Sit Bent, And Talk Straight"	Claire Oakley	Nadia Latif	8 November 2023
Three years ago, the heist goes wrong and the culprits get away. In the present, the killer's motives becomes clearer as he besieges Joe, Officer, Youssef and Azar.
6	"Vessels"	Claire Oakley	Rose Lewenstein	8 November 2023
Jules and the children are in danger, a new revelation shocks the gang, and Azar's actions put the team in danger when a trap set for the killer takes a nasty turn.
7	"This Is Our Exit"	Claire Oakley	James McCarthy	8 November 2023
A new clue leads to a mysterious address. Joe's fears for his family grow as he tries to understand what has really happened and faces an impossible decision.
8	"A Forest"	J Blakeson	J Blakeson	8 November 2023
Joe tries to lure Dianne into a trap leading her to letting her guard down. With her true reasons revealed, she and Joe develop a plan involving the rest of the gang, but a confrontation puts everything in jeopardy.

== Production ==
In April 2021, Disney+ had commissioned a series of multiple British produced television series, including Culprits, which was set to be written and directed by J Blakeson. In August, Nathan Stewart-Jarrett was cast in the lead role.

Production on the series began in February 2022, with additions to the cast including Gemma Arterton, Eddie Izzard and Kirby Howell-Baptiste.

Composer Marc Canham wrote the score for the series.

=== Locations ===
Filming of the series took place in both Europe and Ontario, with Canadian locations including Hamilton and Cambridge.

UK filming took place in a house on Hickin Street, Isle of Dogs, London, designed by Vandana Goyal from Studio 9 Architects, London. Further filming took place in Manchester, on Dale Street and Paton Street, and in a park off of Paradise Street in Rotherhithe, London, during March 2022.

On 23 March 2022, the production company (Character 7) cordoned off Little Lever Street and Bradley's Court in Northern Quarter, Manchester, with the assistance of Greater Manchester Police. The scene being filmed featured a S.W.A.T team shooting at a fleeing car. Character 7 had placed notices around the surrounding areas some weeks earlier notifying residents that there would be loud gun fire and a screeching car. On the day of filming, a production fire engine sprayed the roads so that it would appear that it had been raining during the scene.

== Release ==
The series premiered on Star via Disney+ on 8 November 2023 in several countries around the world as a Star Original.

The series was shown on the free-to-air channel SBS Television and SBS on Demand in Australia in January 2024.
