= Infidel (film) =

2020 film by Cyrus Nowrasteh

- Theatrical release poster
- Directed by: Cyrus Nowrasteh
- Written by: Cyrus Nowrasteh
- Produced by: Cyrus Nowrasteh; Aaron Brubaker
- Starring: Jim Caviezel; Claudia Karvan; Hal Ozsan; Stelio Savante; Aly Kassem; Bijan Daneshmand; Isabelle Adriani
- Cinematography: Joel Ransom
- Edited by: Paul Seydor; Janie Gaddy
- Music by: Natalie Holt
- Production companies: D'Souza Media; New Path Pictures
- Distributed by: Cloudburst Entertainment
- Release date: September 18, 2020 (United States)
- Running time: 107 minutes
- Country: United States
- Language: English
- Box office: $4.1 million

Infidel is a 2020 American political thriller written, directed, and produced by Cyrus Nowrasteh and starring Jim Caviezel, Claudia Karvan, Hal Ozsan, Stelio Savante, Aly Kassem, Bijan Daneshmand, and Isabelle Adriani. The film's executive producer is Dinesh D'Souza, who aided the film with his production company D'Souza Media.

It is the second collaboration between Nowrasteh and Caviezel, following The Stoning of Soraya M. (2008). Both films deal with corruption and human rights abuses by the Iranian regime, and center on foreign journalists (played by Caviezel) whose rights are infringed upon and violated by the Iranian antagonists.

The film was theatrically released in the United States by Cloudburst Entertainment on September 18, 2020.

== Plot summary ==
Doug Rawlins, an outspoken Christian American journalist and blogger, is kidnapped by members of the Iranian regime while he is in Cairo, Egypt making speeches. He is then taken to the Middle East and put on trial for erroneous and phony spying charges. His wife Liz, a State Department official, tries to use her influence to get the American government involved. She wants the US government to get her husband back. However, she soon realizes that the American government will not get involved. Thus she decides to go to the Middle East to rescue him herself.

== Cast ==
- Jim Caviezel as Doug Rawlins
- Claudia Karvan as Elizabeth Rawlins
- Hal Ozsan as Ramzi
- Stelio Savante as Pierre Barthes
- Aly Kassem as Javid
- Bijan Daneshmand as Dr. Hossein Tehrani
- Isabelle Adriani as Maria Landi
- J.R. Cacia as Sgt. Knebel
- Nadeem Srouji as Larijani
- Noor Taher as Meena
- Rula Khoury as Journalist

== Production ==
Infidel was written, directed, and produced by Iranian-American filmmaker Cyrus Nowrasteh. It serves as a spiritual successor to his 2009 film The Stoning of Soraya M., which also dealt with abuses and corruption by the Iranian regime and starred Jim Caviezel as a foreign journalist antagonized by the regime. Nowrasteh cited several real world instances of American nationals imprisoned by the Iranian government, including Xiyue Wang and Robert Levinson.

The film was shot on-location in Jordan, where Nowrasteh previously shot Soraya M. On his website, Nowrasteh stated the Jordanian film commission kept its filming secret for fear of objections from the Iranian government, and the film had heavy security. When the Iranian government did become aware of Nowrasteh being in Amman to film, it voiced its displeasure to the Jordanian government.

The story centers on a Christian underground inside Iran, led primarily by women. They work together in the film with Muslims who are also in opposition to the Iranian regime, by helping the main character, Doug Rawlins (portrayed by Jim Caviezel) and his wife, Liz (played by Claudia Karvan). Another actress was set to play Liz but left the film only weeks before filming due to a conflicting commitment. Karvan was recommended by Caviezel who worked with her on Long Weekend (2008).

One of the film's producers was Dinesh D’Souza. He helped distribute the film with his company D'Souza Media. D'Souza had previously produced several political documentaries including 2016: Obama's America, Hillary's America: The Secret History of the Democratic Party, Death of a Nation, and Trump Card. Infidel was his first narrative film.

== Release ==
In March 2020, CloudBurst Entertainment acquired the rights to the film, and slated it for a September 11, 2020 release, which was later pushed back a week. Infidel was theatrically released in the United States on September 18, 2020.

== Reception ==
=== Box office ===
Infidel grossed $1.4 million from 1,724 theaters (an average of $802 per-venue) in its opening weekend, finishing third at the box office; 57% of its audience was male, with 85% being over the age of 25. It fell 45% to $761,136 in its second weekend, then made $460,450 in its third weekend.

=== Critical response ===
On Rotten Tomatoes the film holds an approval rating of 58% based on 12 reviews, with an average rating of 5.7/10. According to PostTrak, 86% of audience members gave the film a positive score.

Sheila O'Malley of RogerEbert.com gave the film 2.5/4 stars, writing: "Nowrasteh handles the action sequences confidently and there are many legitimately gripping moments. The best moments for me were the small ones, the intimate ones. Caviezel is often a very solemn figure on-screen, and here, Karvan makes him laugh." Writing for Variety, Peter Debruge said: "Although Caviezel's character is meant to stand in for all Americans unjustly imprisoned by Iran, it would be irresponsible to take the film’s 'inspired by true events' claim too seriously. That doesn't mean it's not satisfying to watch Liz and several co-conspirators raid the facility in an attempt to liberate Doug and all those unjustly detained political prisoners. In this fantasy telling, at least, God is on his side."

== Accolades ==
The film won the Faith & Freedom Award for Movies at the 2021 MovieGuide Awards.
