= Rakeen Saad =

Jordanian actress

- ركين سعد
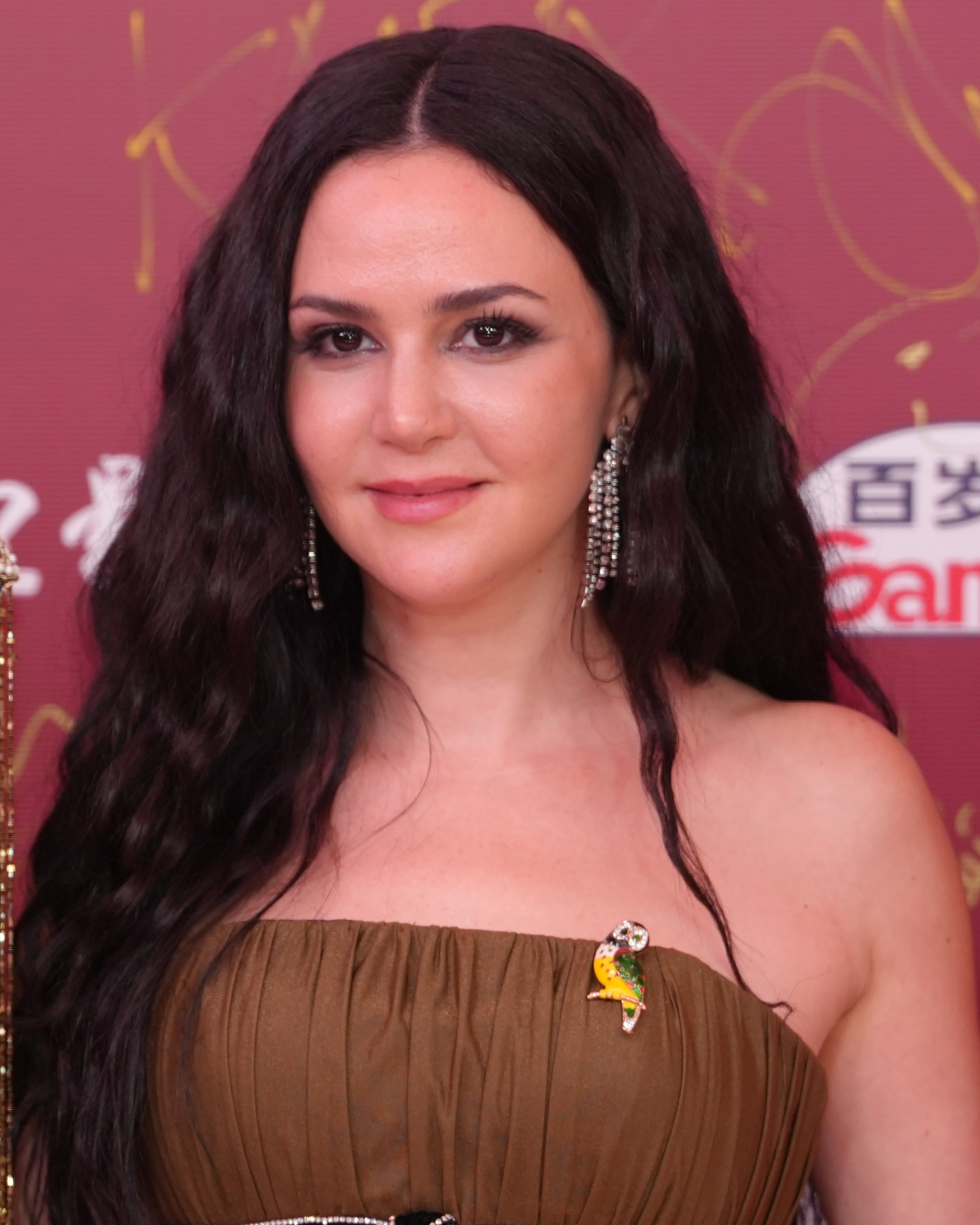
- Saad at 2026 Shanghai International Film Festival
- Born: Rakeen Sa’ad Al-Silawi; 16 December 1989 (age 36); Amman, Jordan
- Education: University of Exeter
- Occupation: Actress
- Years active: 2010-present
- Known for: AlRawabi School for Girls
- Father: Saad Al-Silawi

Rakeen Saad Al-Silawi (Arabic: ركين سعد السيلاوي) is a Jordanian actress.

== Life ==
She had her first role on TV in the series Quds Gate (Bawabet Al Quds). She appeared in various Jordanian film and series.

== Filmography ==
=== Film ===
Year	Title	Role	Notes
2015	3000 Nights	Jamila	
2016	The Worthy	Maryam	
2020	Chronicles of Her	Diana	
2021	The Knower	Rim	
2024	Seeking Haven for Mr. Rambo	Asmaa	
TBA	The Way of the Wind		

=== Television ===
Year	Title	Role	Notes
2012	Farouk Omar	Asma bint Abu Baker	2 episodes
2013	Zain	Farah	
2013–2016	FemaleShow	Ghinwa	Main role (28 episodes)
2015	Madam President	Maya	Main role (15 episodes)
2016	Samarqand	Atun	Main role (30 episodes)
2017	Sunset Oasis	Malika	Main role (30 episodes)
2018	Bel Hagm el A'eli	Amira	3 episodes
2021–2024	AlRawabi School for Girls	Noaf	Main role (season 1); guest (season 2)
2022	Rivo	Mariam Hassan Fakhr Eldin	Main role (10 episodes)
2023	Kaboos	Salha	1 episode
2026	Abb, w Laken... (A Father, but...)	Miss. Mariam	Main character(15 episode)

== Stage ==
Year	Title	Role	Notes
2005–2006	Mud		
200-	Shadows		
2011	Endgame		
2013	Arab Spring Night's Dream		
2013	Very Far Away		

== Awards ==
- Jordan: Queen Rania's Award for Excellence 2006.
