= Darin J. Sallam =

Jordanian Palestinian filmmaker

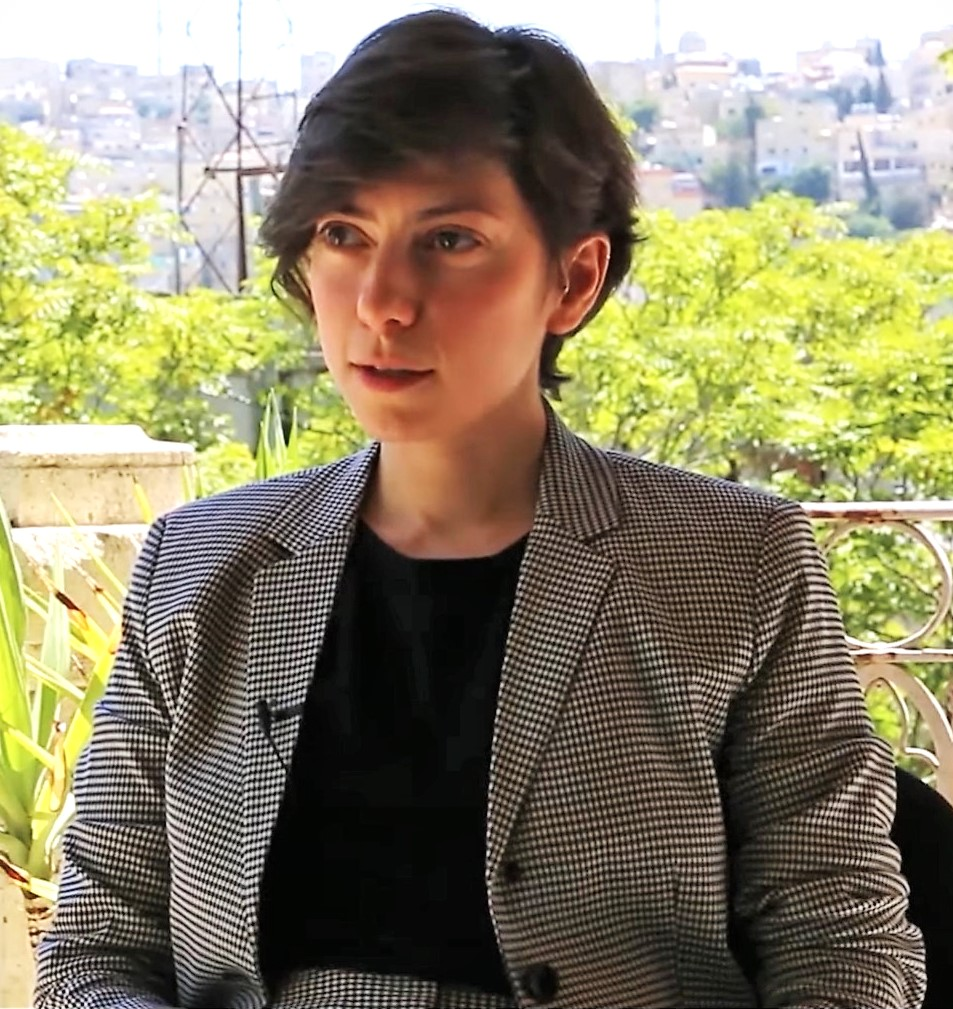
- Sallam speaks about Farha in 2021
- Born: 1987; Kuwait
- Education: Red Sea Institute of Cinematic Arts
- Occupation(s): director, screenwriter

Darin J. Sallam (born 1987) is a Jordanian film director and writer of Palestinian roots. She has five award-winning short films to her name, including Still Alive, The Dark Outside and “The Parrot”. Farha (2021) is her debut narrative feature film as director.

She graduated from the Red Sea Institute of Cinematic Arts (RSICA) with a MFA in Cinematic Arts.

== Farha ==
Sallam's first film as director Farha tells the story of a girl caught in the raids of a Palestinian village during the Nakba. Sallam started writing the film in 2016 but faced great pushback, including warnings that the film would end her career. Farha is based on the story on a surviving Palestinian woman who fled to Syria and recounted her ordeal to Sallam's mother. The film has been streamed on Netflix generating a condemnation by the Israeli government.

== Filmography ==
- The Balcony (2008), short film
- Still Alive (2009), short film
- The Dark Outside (2014), short film
- The Parrot (2016), short film
- Farha (2021)

== Awards and nominations ==
- Film Prize of the Robert Bosch Stiftung (2015) for The Parrot (short fiction film)
- Best Youth Feature Film category at the 2022 Asia Pacific Screen Awards for Farha
- Farha is Jordan's submission in the Best International Feature Film category at the 95th Academy Awards.
