= Red Sea Institute of Cinematic Arts =

Film institute in Jordan

Coordinates: 29°31′N 35°00′E

The Red Sea Institute of Cinematic Arts
- Type: Film School
- Established: 2008
- Dean: James T. Hindman, Ph.D.
- Faculty: 10 full time
- Administrative staff: 14 full time
- Location: Aqaba, Jordan
- Website: rsica.edu.jo

The Red Sea Institute of Cinematic Arts (RSICA) is an MFA program in Cinematic Arts based in Aqaba, Jordan. RSICA is a joint effort of Royal Film Commission – Jordan and the University of Southern California School of Cinematic Arts.

The Red Sea Institute of Cinematic Arts officially opened in September 2008, offering a Master of Fine Arts Degree in Cinematic Arts.

== Overview ==
The institute is in line with King Abdullah II’s efforts to expand the skills of young Middle East and North Africa filmmakers and artist by giving them training in the use of latest technologies in filmmaking and production.

In 2005 and 2006, USC faculty and staff traveled to Jordan to conduct the initial training programs in directing, cinematography, sound, editing, and screenwriting. This blossomed to become RSICA, a fully accredited and free-standing graduate institute that offers a two-year Master's of Fine Arts degree through advanced education in cinema, television and a wide range of screen-based media.

RSICA is located in Aqaba, a Special Economic Zone in Jordan on the Red Sea bordering Saudi Arabia, Egypt and Israel. Its facilities include digital screening rooms, postproduction, animation and interactive media laboratories; sound stages; high-end professional video production packages and an extensive digital and print library.

== Faculty ==
Faculty has been drawn from industry, arts and academic institutions around the world. Students are selected from a diverse pool of talented applicants from the Middle East and North Africa. The first class was admitted September 2008, and the first graduating class in June 2010. Subsequently, RSICA celebrated graduating classes in 2011 and 2012.

The institute's program is intense and the classes are small. The current faculty/student ratio is 4 to 1.

Admission is based on a competitive portfolio, clear evidence of talent and outstanding personal expression as well as strong potential for creative collaboration.

== Future of RSICA ==
The school moved its premises to Amman in mid-2012 and has been effectively downsized to only one class. Due to the lack of financial resources, it is unclear whether the school could be sustained, or if it will accept any more students.

== Location change to Amman in 2012 ==
RSICA has moved locations in the downsizing process, to a temporary location in Amman, in the building of SAE Amman.
