= Jonid Jorgji =

Albanian film director, writer, producer and cultural administrator

- Born: 1986 (age 39–40); Tirana, Albania
- Occupations: Filmmaker, Director, Writer, Producer, Public Administrator (Chairman)
- Known for: Two Lions to Venice
- Office: Chairman of the National Center of Cinematography
- Term: July 2025

Jonid Jorgji (born 1986) is an Albanian director, writer, producer and cultural administrator. He is the Chairman of the National Center of Cinematography of Albania, a position he has held since July 2025.

== Education and career ==
Born in Tirana, Jorgji completed studies in film and politics. He has worked in the media sector for over a decade. Since 2009, he has served as the President of the Association of Young Albanian Filmmakers. In 2016, he established a production and distribution company, through which he has produced and directed films, documentaries, and commercials.

== Public administration ==
Prior to his appointment as Chairman of the National Center of Cinematography, Jorgji directed the Creative Industries Agency (Agjencia e Industrive Kreative). During his tenure, he oversaw various cultural projects in Tirana, including the Agimi Art Center (Qendra e Artit Agimi), the Maks Velo Cinema, the Tirana Film Office, Microfolie Tirana, and the Tirana Art Cooperative. He has also contributed to the development of cultural, social, and educational policies in Albania.

He took the office of the chairman of National Center of Cinematography (QKK) with a plan to reform this sector in Albania.

== Filmography ==
Jorgji is a director and screenwriter known for feature films and experimental formats. His directorial work includes:

- Two Lions to Venice (Dy Luanë drejt Venecias, 2020) – A comedy-drama about two Albanian filmmakers traveling to the Venice Film Festival. The film was selected as the Albanian entry for the Best International Feature Film at the 94th Academy Awards.
- The Sweet Dealer (2020) – Web series.
- A Circus Story – A virtual reality 360° film, noted as the first of its kind produced in Albania.
- Lost Days (2010) – Short film.
