= Ali Maher (artist/architect) =

Ali Maher (1958 – June 10, 2013) was an artist, architect, teacher, and cultural icon in Amman, Jordan. At the time of his death, he was a commissioner of Jordan's Royal Film Commission and founder of the Atelier Baba art school. In 2008, during his time as commissioner he obtained assorted material from the Jordan-Soviet Friendship Society. The material proved to be a valuable insight in the relations between Jordan and the Soviet Union during the Cold War. Maher also founded JAID, Jordan's first animation and industrial design studio. He directed the Darat al Funun, an Amman-based non-profit organization promoting modern art, for ten years. He taught and lectured at numerous universities, including the University of Jordan, Petra University, Balqa Applied University, and the German-Jordanian University. Additionally, Maher worked as a design consultant and temporarily owned a private architectural office.

== Career ==
Ali Maher was born in 1958 in Amman. His father, Fawaz Maher, was a general in the Jordanian armed forces and at one point leader of the Circassian tribes in Jordan. His father also had close ties to the Soviet Union and was a member of the Jordan-Soviet Friendship Society. Ali Maher went to study architecture at Moscow Architectural Institute in the Soviet Union.

Maher's paintings and book illustrations are recognized throughout Amman, his style is described as "somewhere between Chagal and Dali but with an added impressionist zeal." In one of his pieces of work Maher criticized honor killings. Maher also appeared in several Jordanian films, most notably "Captain Abu Rhaed." Widely known as "Baba" or the "Sheikh of Amman," Maher's death was noted by Jordan's major newspapers.

== Death ==
Ali Maher died on June 10, 2013, due to a stroke.
