= Antanas Škėma =

Lithuanian actor-writer

- Born: November 29, 1910; Łódź, Congress Poland
- Died: September 11, 1961 (aged 50); East Cocalico, Pennsylvania, U.S.
- Occupations: Novelist, short story writer, playwright
- Writing career
- Genres: Absurdism, existentialism, modernism, pessimism
- Notable work: Balta drobulė (White Shroud)

Antanas Škėma (Lithuanian pronunciation: [ɐnˈtaːnɐs ˈʃkʲeːmɐ]; November 29, 1910 – September 11, 1961) was a Lithuanian writer, playwright, stage actor and director. His best known work is the novel Balta drobulė (White Shroud).

== Life and career ==
Antanas Škėma was born on November 29, 1910 (according to his birth certificate in 1911) in Łódź, Poland, where his father was sent to work as a teacher. During World War I he lived in Russia with his parents. In 1921 they all returned to Lithuania.

He attended high schools in Radviliškis and Kaunas. In 1929 he entered the University of Lithuania Medical faculty, but in 1931 he transferred his studies to the Faculty of Law. At that time the school was renamed as Vytautas Magnus University.

In 1935 he joined the theatre studio led by V. Sipavičius-Fedotas and was later accepted to the Lithuanian State Theatre in Kaunas. In 1936 Škėma started acting on the inter-war Lithuania's main stage. While he was living in Kaunas he married Janina Ciolkevičiūtė. From 1940 to 1944 he worked at Vilnius State Theater, now also as a director. Škėma had parts in nearly every play of that period. His daughter, Kristina, was born in 1940 as World War II broke out and the Soviet Union occupied Lithuania.

Škėma briefly participated in the anti-Soviet uprising during the German occupation in 1941. In 1944, upon the second Soviet occupation of Lithuania, he left for Germany, where he was involved in some artistic work with Lithuanian troupes, primarily in DP (displaced person) camps. It was also there that his first book, a collection of short stories Firebrands and Sparks (Nuodėguliai ir kibirkštys), was published.

In 1949 Škėma left Europe for United States. He did menial work for a living, including working as an elevator operator, and he eagerly participated in the cultural activities of the Lithuanian exiles. He took part in the Chicago Theatre and Boston's Drama Group performances, staged his own plays. Further short stories, dramas and the novel Balta drobulė were published.

In 1960–1961 he worked in the editorial office of the newspaper Vienybė. In addition, he was lecturing, debating, and writing articles on theatre and literature for various publications.

Antanas Škėma died in a car accident in Pennsylvania on September 11, 1961.

== Literary work ==
Škėma's best-known novel, Balta drobulė (1958), aroused vivid literary discussions. Most reviewers considered it an interesting creative experiment that attempted to lead the Lithuanian fiction down an untrodden path. The novel follows an exiled Lithuanian poet named Antanas Garšva who, like Škėma himself, works as an elevator operator in New York. The author examines alienation, trauma and creativity through the character of Garšva and his tragic experiences that ultimately lead to madness. While the immediate action lasts little more than a day, through the memories the story covers Garšva's whole life from early childhood, via the inter-war period, the occupations and refugee camps in Europe to the new life in the US. The novel is partly autobiographical.

Antanas Škėma uses the innovative (for Lithuanian literature) stream of consciousness narrative to great effect, creating entirely his own style. The novel is defined by irony, occasional surrealism, unexpected metaphor, acute stylistic contrasts where lyrical and aesthetically delicate confessions suddenly give way to coarse, cynical images, and a broad spectrum of intertextual cultural allusions. On the technical level, the author often plays with the sounds of words, disengaging phonemes from their literal meaning, and also expresses the cultural clash through the Americanization of language.

Originally printed by an émigré Lithuanian publishing house in London as Nida Book Club series edition (Nidos Knygų Klubo leidinys. no. 23.), Balta drobulė was released in Lithuania in 1990. Since then, it has been translated and published in Estonian (1992), Latvian (2000), English (2017), as White Shroud, German (2017), as Das weiße Leintuch, and French (2024), as Le Linceul blanc.

His short story Izaokas (Isaak) was made into a major motion picture of the same name in 2019.

His play The Awakening saw its American debut posthumously in 1985 at the Courtyard Playhouse in New York's West Village.
