= Zain Duraie =

Jordanian director, writer

- زين دريعي
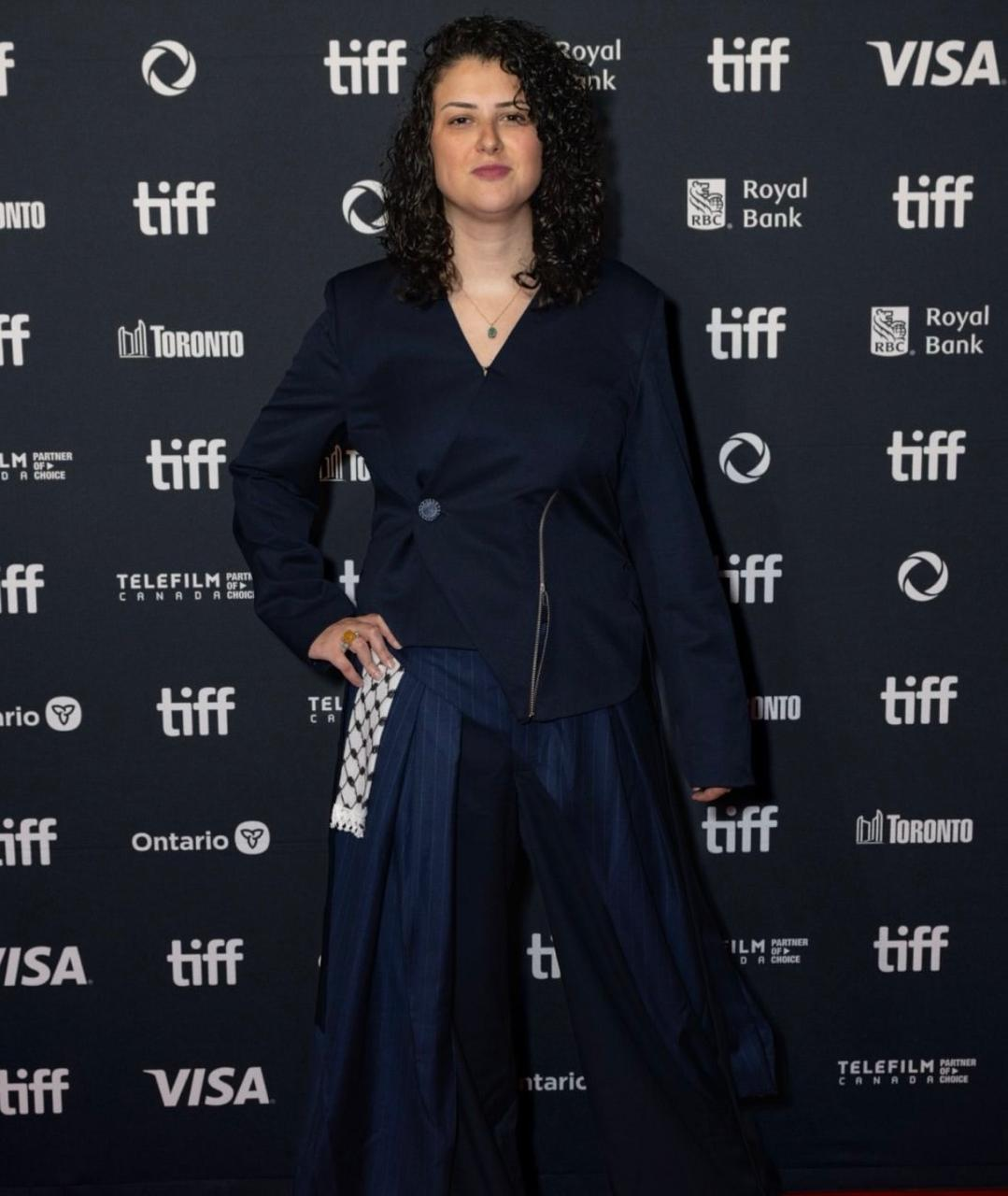
- Born: 12 August; Amman, Jordan
- Education: Toronto Film School
- Occupations: Director, and Writer
- Years active: 2013 - present

Zain Duraie (Arabic: زين دريعي) is a Jordanian director and writer. She is best known for her short film Give Up the Ghost (2019) and her feature film debut Sink (2025).

== Life and career ==
Duraie was born and raised in Amman, Jordan. Duraie graduated from the Toronto Film School. Her directorial debut short film Horizon, won the Best of the Festival Selects at the Palm Springs International Festival of Short Films, Audience Choice Award at the Franco Arab Film Festival and Best first young filmmaker at the Algeria’s International women film festival. In 2019, her second short film Give up the Ghost premiered in the Orizzonti Short Films Competition at the Venice International Film Festival and won the Best Arab Short Film award at the El Gouna Film Festival. In 2024, she was selected for Berlinale Talents and named one of Screen International's Arab Stars of Tomorrow.

Duraie’s debut feature film, Sink, premiered in the Discovery section 2025 Toronto International Film Festival, where it was the only Arab film in the section. It later had its European premiere in competition at the BFI London Film Festival as the only Arab film in the First Feature Competition for the Sutherland Award. The film went on to receive the prestigious Ecumenical Jury Award at the 74th International Filmfestival Mannheim-Heidelberg and the Bronze Tanit at the Carthage Film Festival, becoming the first Jordanian film to receive both awards.

== Filmography ==
Year	Film	Writer	Director	Notes
2013	Horizon	✓	✓	Short film
2019	Give Up the Ghost	✓	✓	Short film
2025	Sink	✓	✓	

As actress

- 2016 - In Overtime (short film)
- 2018 - The Box (short film)
