= Farha (film) =

2021 film by Darin J. Sallam

- Directed by: Darin J. Sallam
- Screenplay by: Darin J. Sallam
- Produced by: Deema Azar; Ayah Jardaneh; William Johansson Kalen
- Starring: Karam Taher; Ashraf Barhom; Ali Suliman; Tala Gammoh; Sameera Asir; Majd Eid; Firas Taybeh
- Cinematography: Rachelle Aoun
- Edited by: Pierre Laurent
- Production companies: TaleBox; Laika Film & Television; Chimney
- Distributed by: Picture Tree International
- Release dates: 14 September 2021 (Toronto Film Festival); 1 December 2022 (Netflix)
- Running time: 92 minutes
- Countries: Jordan; Sweden; Saudi Arabia
- Languages: Palestinian Arabic; English; Hebrew

Farha (Arabic: فرحة, romanized: Farḥa) is a 2021 internationally co-produced historical drama film written and directed by Darin J. Sallam. The film depicts a Palestinian girl's coming-of-age experience during the Nakba, the 1948 displacement of Palestinians from their homeland. Sallam based the screenplay on a true story that she was told as a child about a girl named Radieh. It premiered at the Toronto Film Festival on 14 September 2021.

== Plot ==
While other girls are excited about their friend's marriage, 14-year-old Palestinian girl Farha dreams about pursuing education in the city like her best friend Farida. Farha demands this from her father Abu Farha, but he wants her to get married instead. Her uncle Abu Walid asks Abu Farha to consider Farha's request. One night in 1948, a group of local militias visit Abu Farha, who is the village chief and mayor, requesting that he join their fight against the Nakba. He refuses since his main purpose is to take care of his village.

During the wedding of Farha's friend, Abu Farha tells her that he had accepted her request to pursue education. While celebrating the news with Farida, Zionist militias attack the village; military speakers order the villagers to evacuate. Abu Farida takes Farha and Farida into his car to evacuate. Abu Farha decides to stay behind and entrusting Abu Farida to look after Farha, although she decides to join her father. Abu Farha takes her back home, arms himself with a rifle, and locks Farha in a store room, telling her to stay hidden and promising to take her when it is safe. For days, while awaiting news from her father, she continues to hear sounds of warfare and is only able to peer through a hole facing the courtyard.

A Palestinian family, Abu Mohammad and Um Mohammad and their two young children, enter the courtyard, where the mother gives birth to a baby boy. Farha asks Abu Muhammad to let her out but, before he can, Haganah militias demand the family come out and surrender. Abu Mohammad goes outside. A hooded Palestinian informant working for the Haganah appears to know the villager and tells the commander that Abu Mohammad is from a different village. The commander searches the house for guns and finds Mohammad's family hiding. The family, except the newborn baby, are executed at gunpoint, causing a moral crisis for the informant, who was promised that women and children would not be hurt in exchange for his collaboration. The informant goes to Farha and whispers her name. Farha can see his face briefly through the door, and realizes the collaborator is her uncle. He does not reveal her whereabouts to the militias. The commander asks a young soldier to execute the newborn baby without wasting a bullet. The soldier cannot bring himself to stomp on him and covers the infant in a towel, leaving him to die on the courtyard floor.

Farha struggles to open the door to get to the baby. After ransacking the pantry she finds a hidden pistol, which she uses to shoot the door lock and escape the village. Farha (whose real name is Raddiyah) never found her father, whose fate remained unknown but was probably killed during the Nakba. Farha eventually made her way to Syria and told her story which has been passed down through generations.

== Cast ==
- Karam Taher as Farha
- Ashraf Barhom as Abu Farha
- Ali Suliman as Abu Walid
- Tala Gammoh as Farida
- Sameera Elasir as Um Mohammad
- Majd Eid as Abu Mohammad
- Firas Taybeh as Abu Farida

== Production ==
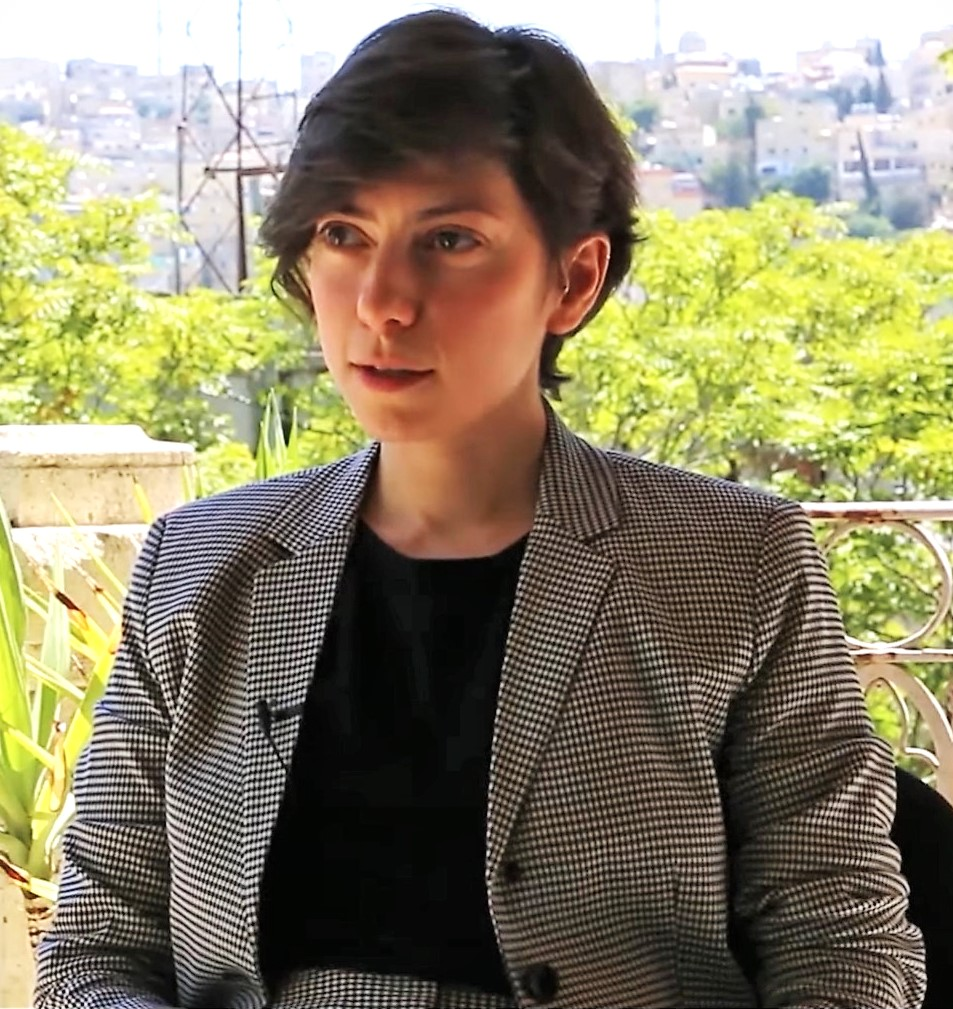
Darin J. Sallam speaks about Farha in a 2021 interview for The Royal Film Commission – Jordan.

=== Development ===
Farha was written and directed by Darin J. Sallam—her first feature-length film. Sallam's own family also fled from Palestine to Jordan in 1948. The film is based on a true story recounted to Sallam's mother by a friend, living as a refugee in Syria, about her experience during the Nakba in which hundreds of thousands of Palestinians were expelled from their homeland. Sallam began working on the script for the film in 2016 and had a rough outline of the major scenes by 2019.

The film was produced by TaleBox, based in Jordan, and co-produced by Laika Film & Television and Chimney, both based in Sweden. Deema Azar and Ayah Jardaneh are credited as producers along with William Johansson Kalén as co-producer.

=== Casting ===
This film is the first on-screen appearance for the lead actor Karam Taher. Sallam said that, when casting the titular role, she was "looking for a girl that [she] could stay with for 52 minutes inside a room". Taher's initial audition did not go well. Sallam said, "[Taher] was shy [...] But what really stayed with me was her face: she had a very specific face and very expressive eyes. From one side, her face was like a child, and from the other, she was a young woman—it's a coming-of-age story."

=== Filming ===
Farha was filmed in Jordan with cinematography by Rachelle Aoun. Sallam stated in an interview that "[s]ome of the crew members were crying behind the monitor while shooting, remembering their families and their stories, and the stories they heard from their grandparents".

== Release ==
Farha premiered at the Toronto Film Festival on 14 September 2021. It was subsequently screened to critical acclaim in Rome, Busan, Gothenburg and Lyon. The film also received post-production funding from the Red Sea International Film Festival and was shown at the inaugural edition of festival in Jeddah in December 2021. On 7 November 2022, the film was screened at the Palestine Cinema Days festival in Ramallah, Palestine. The successful film festival tour also led to a deal with Netflix through Picture Tree International. The film began streaming on Netflix on 1 December 2022.

=== Political reaction ===
"We are overwhelmed by the amount of support the film is receiving globally and are grateful to everyone who is doing their part to stand up against this attack and ensure the film is spoken about and seen … The film exists, we exist, and we will not be silenced."

— From a statement by the filmmakers

Following the 1 December release on Netflix, the streaming platform and film were criticised by Israeli politicians. Israel's finance minister Avigdor Lieberman criticised Netflix for streaming the production and ordered the treasury to revoke state funding to Al Saraya Theater, which scheduled screenings of the film, with the "goal of preventing the screening of this shocking film or other similar ones in the future". Culture minister Hili Tropper called a screening by an Israeli theatre "a disgrace". The reaction to the film has focused on a scene that depicts the killing of a Palestinian family by Israeli soldiers. In the days following its release, Farha became the target of a coordinated downvoting campaign on IMDb, while the filmmakers were subjected to harassment on social media. The campaign "appears to have backfired", according to The Hollywood Reporter, with the film's ratings on IMDb quickly rebounding. Sallam responded to the criticism in an interview with Time magazine, noting that she had been subjected to "hateful, racist messages":

The reason I'm so shocked by the backlash is because I didn't show anything. Compared to what happened during the massacres, this was a small event. I don't know why some Israeli officials are very upset about this scene. It's blurry and out of focus because I always said it's about this girl's journey... I feel it is intended to harm the Oscars campaign so I really hope it doesn't affect this negatively... Denying the Nakba is like denying who I am and that I exist. It's very offensive to deny a tragedy that my grandparents and my father went through and witnessed, and to make fun of it in the attacks that I'm receiving.

== Reception ==
The New York Times reviewer Beatrice Loayza described the film as "a brutal kind of coming-of-age story" and that while it "primarily unfolds in a tiny storage room, [the film] speaks volumes". CNN said that the film offers "a perspective on the events that led to Israel's founding that is rarely seen or heard on a global mainstream platform". In a review for The Hindu, Pallavi Keswani praised Farha for "succinctly put[ting] forth its messaging, conveying the brutality of violence through a barebones narrative". Reviewing the film for the Institute for Palestine Studies, Umayyah Cable, an assistant professor at the University of Michigan, wrote that "the script is often didactic, the editing is at times rushed, and performances by the film's biggest name actors are sometimes surprisingly awkward". Cable summarised: "Farha is not a very good film, but it is spectacular nonetheless."

On the review aggregator website Rotten Tomatoes, 100% of 13 critics' reviews are positive, with an average rating of 7.1/10.

The activist group Iron Lion Zion viewed the film negatively, claiming it contains a blood libel and would lead to Antisemitism.

== Awards ==
Farha was the winner of the Best Youth Feature Film category at the 2022 Asia Pacific Screen Awards. The film was Jordan's submission in the Best International Feature Film category at the 95th Academy Awards.
