= Jinn (TV series) =

- Genre: Supernatural; Teen drama; Fantasy
- Created by: Mir-Jean Bou Chaaya; Elan Dassani; Rajeev Dassani
- Directed by: Mir-Jean Bou Chaaya; Amin Matalqa
- Starring: Salma Malhas; Sultan Alkhail; Hamzeh Okab; Aysha Shahaltough; Zaid Zoubi; Ban Halaweh; Yasser Al Hadi; Mohammad Nizar; Mohammad Hindieh; Karam Tabbaa; Abdelrazzaq Jarkas; Ralph Richie Hilado
- Composer: Etyen
- Country of origin: Jordan
- Original language: Arabic
- No. of seasons: 1
- No. of episodes: 5

Production
- Executive producers: Christian Bou Chaaya; Lucien Bou Chaaya; Mir-Jean Bou Chaaya; Elan Dassani; Rajeev Dassani; Jason George
- Production locations: Amman, Jordan; Petra, Jordan
- Cinematography: Fadi Kassem
- Editor: Daniel Grinspum
- Camera setup: Single-camera
- Running time: 25–47 minutes
- Production companies: Kabreet Productions; Master Key Productions

Original release
- Network: Netflix
- Release: June 13, 2019

Jinn is a Jordanian Arabic-language supernatural drama television series, created and executive produced by Mir-Jean Bou Chaaya, Elan Dassani and Rajeev Dassani alongside Christian Bou Chaaya and Lucien Bou Chaaya. The series premiered on Netflix on June 13, 2019. The series stars Salma Malhas, Hamzeh Okab, Sultan Alkhail, Aysha Shahaltough, Zaid Zoubi, Yasser Al Hadi, Mohammad Nizar, Mohammad Hindieh and Karam Tabbaa.

== Premise ==
Jinn follows the story of a group of teenagers, who study in a private school in Amman. They go on a field trip to Petra, which is known as home to ancient demons and strange phenomena. The group's lives are disrupted when a spiritual figure appears, accidentally summoned by Mira. They must try and stop Jinn from destroying the world.

== Cast and characters ==
- Salma Malhas as Mira
- Sultan Alkhail as Yassin
- Hamzeh Okab as Kerasquioxian (Keras) / Hosni
- Aysha Shahaltough as Vera
- Zaid Zoubi as Hassan
- Ban Halaweh as Layla
- Yasser Al Hadi as Fahed
- Mohammad Nizar as Nasser
- Mohammad Hindieh as Omar
- Karam Tabbaa as Jameel
- Abdelrazzaq Jarkas as Tareq
- Hana Chamoun as Miss Ola
- Faris Al Bahri as Naji
- Manal Sehaimat as Lubna

== Episodes ==
No.	Title	Directed by	Written by	Original release date
1	"Strange Whispers"	Mir-Jean Bou Chaaya	Elan Dassani & Amin Matalqa	June 13, 2019
2	"Magic Sand"	Mir-Jean Bou Chaaya	Elan Dassani, Rajeev Dassani & Tiffany Ho	June 13, 2019
3	"A Dangerous Funny Feeling"	Amin Matalqa	Elan Dassani, Rajeev Dassani & Dolores Rice	June 13, 2019
4	"#JinnHunter"	Amin Matalqa	Elan Dassani & Rajeev Dassani	June 13, 2019
5	"Careful What You Wish For"	Mir-Jean Bou Chaaya	Elan Dassani & Rajeev Dassani	June 13, 2019

== Production ==
=== Development ===
On February 26, 2018, it was announced that Netflix had given a series order to Jinn, a new television series, directed by Mir-Jean Bou Chaaya, and executive produced by Elan and Rajeev Dassani. The series order was reportedly for a first season of five episodes.

On August 13, 2018, it was announced that in addition to serving as director, Mir-Jean Bou Chaaya would also act as an executive producer. Additionally, it was further reported that writers would include Elan and Rajeev Dassani and Amin Matalqa. Elan was expected to serve as head writer while Matalqa was slated to direct two episodes. Production companies involved with the series set to consist of Kabreet Productions and Master Key Productions. On April 18, 2019, it was announced that the series is scheduled to premiere on June 13, 2019.

=== Casting ===
Alongside the start of production announcement, it was confirmed that the series would star Salma Malhas, Hamzeh Okab, Sultan Alkhail, Aysha Shahaltough, Yasser Al Hadi, and Ban Halaweh.

=== Filming ===
Principal photography began on August 13, 2018 in Amman, Jordan. The shoot was scheduled to last over the course of ten weeks with filming locations including Petra, Wadi Rum as well as a dozen locations in Amman.

== Critical reception ==
The show was panned by Middle East Eye as "badly scripted, poorly acted and sloppily directed", while Thrillist called it "generic," "unrealistic," and "confusing."

Jinn has an 83% rating on Rotten Tomatoes, out of six reviews. Positive reviews praised its consistency, intrigue, and novelty factor. Negative reviews criticize the quality of its acting and script.

The series generated controversy for the scenes that feature “moral degradation”. These include two instances where Malhas's character kissed two different men in separate scenes. Another complaint involved the series's rough language. Jinn became controversial in Jordan, with some government agencies threatening censorship. It was reported that Jordan's top prosecutor asked the Ministry of Interior to stop the show's broadcast.
