= Lana Albeik =

Emirati model and actress

- لانا البيك
- Born: c. 1995; Ajman, United Arab Emirates
- Other name: Lana Al Beik
- Years active: 2017–present
- Modeling information
- Height: 1.65 m (5 ft 5 in)
- Eye color: Green
- Agency: D.Model (Athens)

Lana Albeik (born c. 1995) is a Palestinian-Syrian model and actress born in the UAE and based in Dubai.

== Early life ==
Albeik was born in Ajman, United Arab Emirates to a Palestinian father from Akka and a Syrian mother from Aleppo. She studied film, communications, and Middle Eastern history at university.

== Career ==
Albeik first began modeling when she was cast in photography projects for her friends, who went to art school. She landed her first paid gig with the Dubai-based Palestinian brand Shop Thob. Albeik gained prominence through her work with Hindash Cosmetics and had her first international shoot with Namshi for Puma x Fenty. Previously signed with UNN Model Management, Albeik is currently signed with D.Model in Athens.

In 2020, Albeik modeled the Burberry Her London Dream fragrance with Georgia Palmer, Joanna Halpin, and Suki Sou and the MKS Jewellery charity collection Keepsakes for the Emirates Red Crescent. Albeik went viral when she met Romanian singer Bianca Mihai, her ostensible doppelgänger. She also worked with brands such as Kenzo and appeared on the cover of Elle Arabia.

Albeik and Parvané Barret modeled Rami Al Ali's spring/summer 2020 pastel couture gowns and appeared in a short film for Tory Burch's Middle Eastern fall/winter 2020 collection. Albeik would reunite with Barret the following year for Coach's Signature Leather collection. Albeik also featured in a short fashion film titled The Calling for Roger Vivier's spring/summer 2021 collection and began modeling for the Gaza-based fashion outlet Meera Adnan.

Albeik starred in Calvin Klein's 2022 and 2023 Middle Eastern regional advertising campaigns. Also in 2022, she featured in a photography exhibition for Bloomingdales.

In 2024, Albeik joined the cast of the Netflix Jordanian teen drama AlRawabi School for Girls for its second season as Rand, marking Albeik's television acting debut.
