= Kurdwin Ayub =

Iraqi-Austrian filmmaker (born 1990)

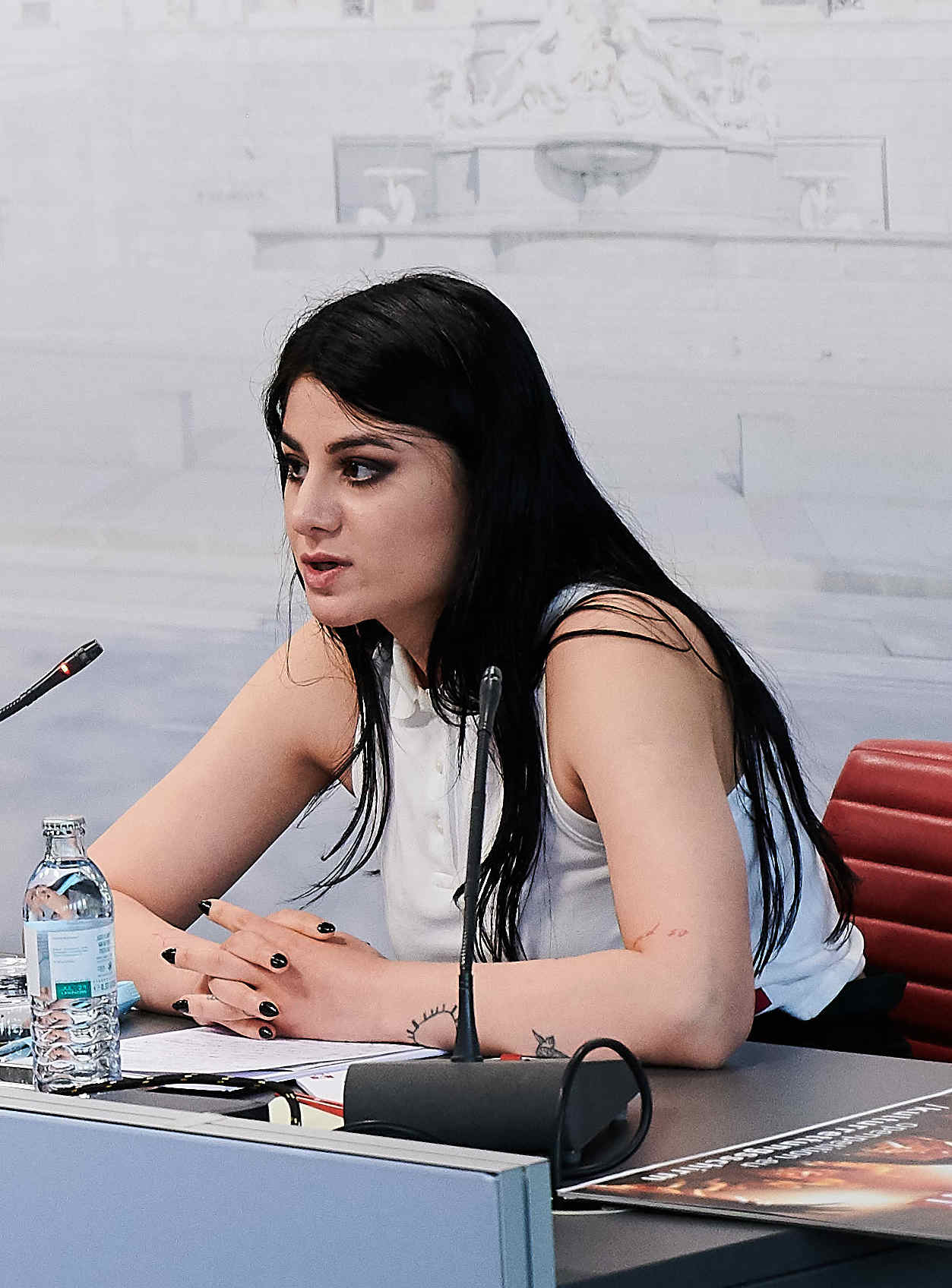
- Ayub in 2020
- Born: 1990 (age 35–36); Duhok, Kurdistan Region, Iraq
- Occupations: Film director, screenwriter, performance artist

Kurdwin Ayub or Kurdvîn Eyûb (born 1990) is a Kurdish-Austrian filmmaker. Her feature film debut Sonne (Sun) was awarded the Best First Film Award at the 2022 Berlin International Film Festival.

== Early life and education ==
Ayub was born to Kurdish parents in Duhok, Iraq; her family came to Austria as refugees when she was a child. She was educated in Vienna, studying painting and animation at the University of Applied Arts and studying performance art at the city's Academy of Fine Arts.

== Career ==
Ayub began directing short films in 2009 and was awarded the MehrWERT Short Film Award at the Vienna International Film Festival in 2011 and 2012.

Paradies! Paradies! (Paradise! Paradise!), Ayub's feature-length directorial debut, followed her father Omar as he visited Kurdish relatives in Duhok after fleeing the city in 1991. The documentary screened at the 2016 Diagonale Film Festival, where Ayub was awarded the Best Camera prize. Her 2018 short film Boomerang was awarded the Jury Prize for Best Short Film at the Max Ophüls Film Festival in 2019.

In 2022, Ayub's full-length fiction debut Sonne (Sun), about three girls who film a music video while wearing burqas, received the Best First Film Award at the 72nd Berlin International Film Festival. The film was nominated for the European Discovery of the Year at the 35th European Film Awards.

Mond (Moon), Ayub's 2024 fiction feature about a former martial artist traveling to Jordan to train the daughters of a wealthy family, premiered at the 77th Locarno Film Festival in competition for the Golden Leopard. The film received the Special Jury Award as well as the Europe Cinemas Label prize, and a special mention from the Ecumenical jury.

== Filmography ==
=== Feature films ===
Year	English title	Original title	Ref.
2016	Paradise! Paradise!	Paradies! Paradies!	
2022	Sun	Sonne	
2024	Moon	Mond	

=== Short films ===
Year	Title	Ref.
2009	Mutterkindpass	
2010	Kaiserschnitt	
2010	Homevideo	
2010	Die Intrige und die Archenmuscheln	
2011	Schneiderei	
2011	Sommerurlaub	
2011	Katzenjammer	
2012	Familienurlaub	
2013	sexy	
2014	VIDEO 1	
2018	Affection von Violet Spin	
2018	Boomerang	
2018	Armageddon	
2019	pretty-pretty	
2020	LOLOLOL	

== Awards and nominations ==
Year	Award	Category	Nominated work	Result	Ref.
2016	Diagonale Film Festival	Best Camera	Paradies! Paradies! (Paradise! Paradise!)	Won	
2019	Max Ophüls Film Festival	Jury Prize for Best Short Film	Boomerang	Won	
2022	Berlin International Film Festival	Best First Film Award	Sonne (Sun)	Won	
2022	European Film Awards	European Discovery of the Year	Sonne (Sun)	Nominated	
2024	Locarno Film Festival	Golden Leopard	Mond (Moon)	Nominated	
2024	Locarno Film Festival	Special Jury Prize	Mond (Moon)	Won	
