= The Royal Film Commission – Jordan =

- الهيئة الملكية الأردنية للأفلام

Agency overview
- Formed: 2003
- Headquarters: Amman
- Minister responsible: Prince Ali Bin Al-Hussein
- Agency executive: Mohannad Al Bakri
- Website: film.jo

The Royal Film Commission – Jordan (RFC) was established to develop an internationally competitive Jordanian film industry.

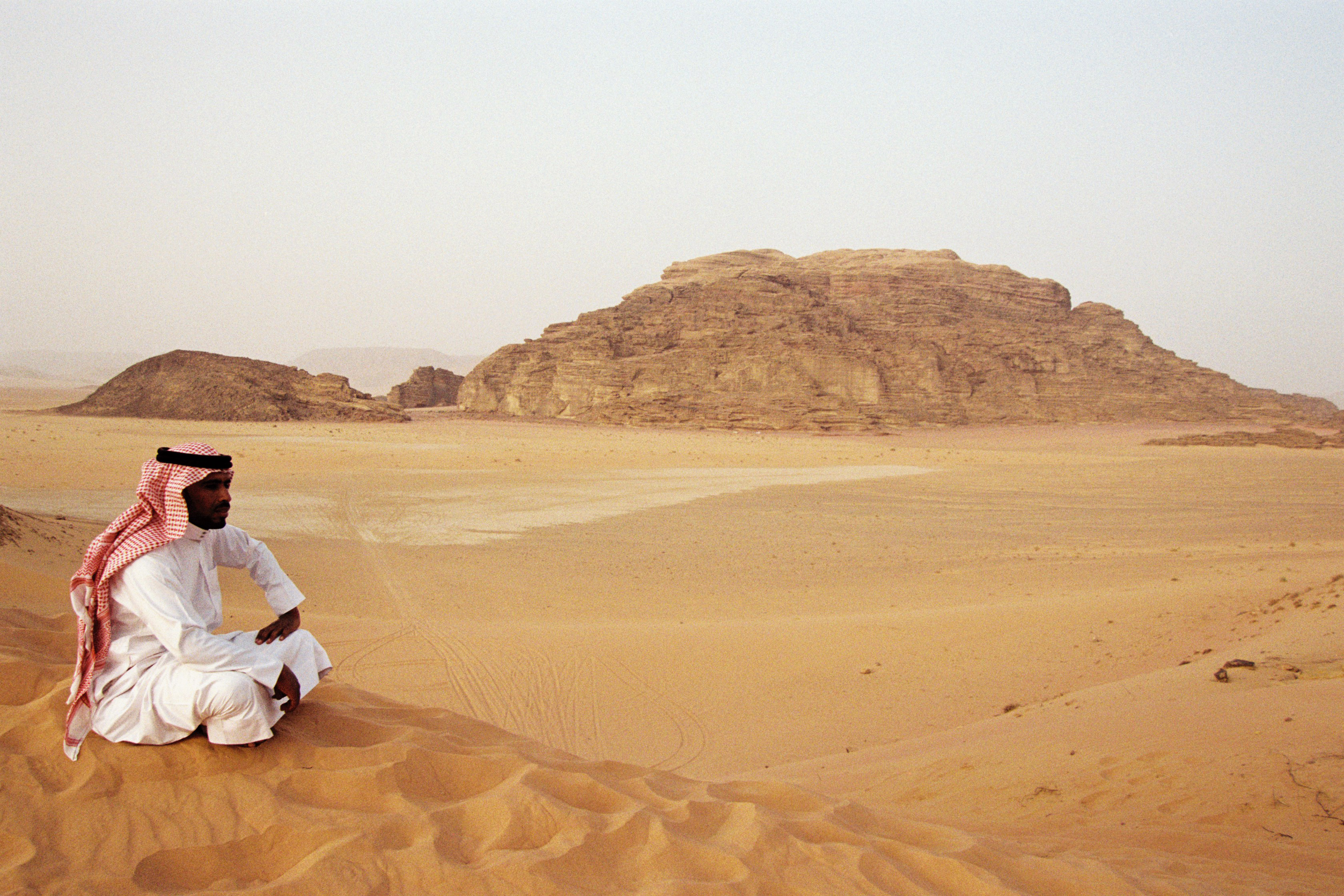
Wadi Rum is a popular film location in Jordan

Founded in accordance with the Royal Film Commission Law No. 27 in 2003 and approved by Law No. 22 in 2008, RFC is a financially and administratively autonomous Jordanian government organization led by a Board of Commissioners chaired by Prince Ali Bin Al-Hussein. Noted Jordanian artist Ali Maher served as the film commissioner of the organization until his death.

The RFC was instrumental in getting Captain Abu Raed produced and submitted to the 2008 Academy Awards, Jordan's first submission to the foreign language category in 50 years. Maher himself even appears in the film in a cameo role.

A member of the Association of Film Commissioners International (AFCI), the RFC was recognized with the LMGI Award for Outstanding Film Commission in 2017 for its work on Rogue One: A Star Wars Story, which filmed at Wadi Rum. The RFC had previously been nominated for its work on The Martian.,
