= 1948 Palestinian expulsion and flight =

Ethnic cleansing, expulsion, and flight of Palestinians during the 1948 Palestine war

- Part of the Nakba, the 1948 Palestine war and the Arab–Israeli conflict
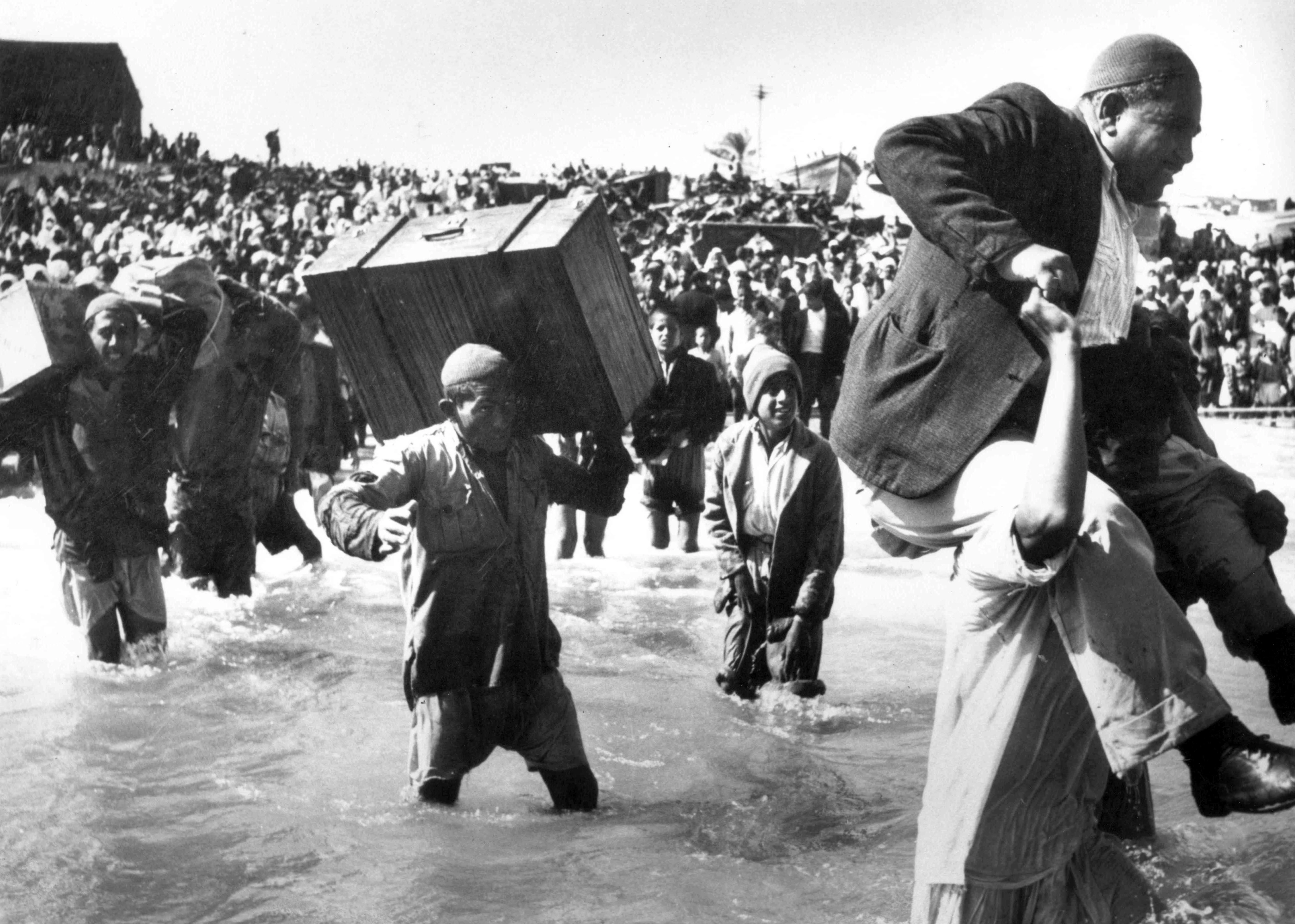
- Palestinian refugees boarding ships on their way to Egypt and Lebanon, 1949
- Location: Mandatory Palestine
- Date: 31 December 1947 – 20 July 1949
- Target: Palestinian Arabs
- Attack type: Ethnic cleansing, forced displacement, dispossession, mass killing, settler colonialism, biological warfare
- Deaths: Unknown. Aref al-Aref gives the number of Palestinian deaths as 13,000, with the majority of that number being civilians. 15,000 deaths estimated by the Palestinian Central Bureau of Statistics "from 1947 to 1949".
- Victims: 750,000+ Palestinian Arabs expelled or fled
- Perpetrators: Israel: Israel Defense Forces; Before 1948: Haganah; Irgun; Lehi
- Motive: Zionism; settler colonialism

During the 1948 Palestine war, more than 700,000 Palestinian Arabs – about half of Mandatory Palestine's predominantly Arab population – were expelled or fled from their homes. Expulsions and attacks against Palestinians were carried out by the Zionist paramilitaries Haganah, Irgun, and Lehi, which merged to become the Israel Defense Forces after the establishment of Israel part way through the war. The expulsion and flight was a central component of the fracturing, dispossession, and displacement of Palestinian society, known as the Nakba.

Dozens of massacres targeting Arabs were conducted by Israeli military forces and between 400 and 600 Palestinian villages were destroyed. The Israeli military operated labor camps for captured Palestinians, most of whom were civilians. Village wells were poisoned in a biological warfare programme, properties were looted to prevent Palestinian refugees from returning, and some sites were renamed.

The precise number of Palestinian refugees, many of whom settled in Palestinian refugee camps in neighboring states, is a matter of dispute, although the number is around 700,000, being approximately 80 percent of the Arab inhabitants of what became Israel. About 250,000–300,000 Palestinians fled or were expelled during the 1947–1948 civil war in Mandatory Palestine, before the termination of the British Mandate on 14 May 1948. The desire to prevent the collapse of the Palestinians and to avoid more refugees are cited as one of the reasons for the 1948 Arab–Israeli War. (Note: Matthew Hogan (2001). The 1948 Massacre at Deir Yassin Revisited: "Meanwhile, the subsequent May 1948 outbreak of regional war between the newly declared state of Israel and the Arab states, beginning the prolonged Arab-Israeli conflict, was contemporaneously explained by Arab League chief Azzam Pasha in terms of the Deir Yassin incident: "The massacre of Deir Yassin was to a great extent the cause of the wrath of the Arab nations and the most important factor for sending [in] the Arab armies.")

Although the causes of the 1948 Palestinian exodus remain a significantly controversial topic in public and political discourse, with a prominent amount of denialism regarding the responsibility of Israeli/Yishuv forces, most scholarship today agrees that expulsions and violence, and the fear thereof, were the primary causes. (Note: Slater, Jerome (2020). Mythologies Without End: The US, Israel, and the Arab-Israeli Conflict, 1917-2020. Oxford University Press, Incorporated. ISBN 978-0-19-045908-6. "There is no serious dispute among Israeli, Palestinian, or other historians about the central facts of the Nakba. All of the leading Israeli New Historians—particularly Morris, Shlaim, Pappé, and Flapan—extensively examined the issue and revealed the facts. Other accounts have reached the same conclusions. For example, see Ben-Ami, "A War to Start All Wars"; Rashid Khalidi, "The Palestinians and 1948"; Walid Khalidi, "Why Did the Palestinians Leave, Revisited"; Masalha, Expulsion of the Palestinians; Raz, Bride and the Dowry. Reviewing the evidence marshaled by Morris and others, Tom Segev concluded that "most of the Arabs in the country, approximately 400,000, were chased out and expelled during the first stage of the war. In other words, before the Arab armies invaded the country" (Haaretz, 18 July 2010). Other estimates have varied concerning the number of Palestinians who fled or were expelled before the May 1948 Arab state attack; Morris estimated the number to be 250,000–300,000 (The Birth of the Palestinian Refugee Problem Revisited, 262); Tessler puts it at 300,000 (A History of the Israeli-Palestinian Conflict, 279); Pappé's estimate is 380,000 (The Making of the Arab-Israeli Conflict, 96). In another recent review of the evidence, the Israeli historian Daniel Blatman estimates the number to be about 500,000 (Blatman, "Netanyahu, This Is What Ethnic Cleansing Really Looks Like"). Whatever the exact number, even Israeli "Old Historians" now admit that during the 1948 war, the Israeli armed forces drove out many of the Palestinians, though they emphasized the action as a military "necessity." For example, see Anita Shapira, Israel: A History, 167–68. In July 2019, the Israeli government sought to cover up the extensive documentary evidence in its state archives that revealed detailed evidence about the extent of the Nakba—even the evidence that had already been published by newspapers and Israeli historians. A Haaretz investigation of the attempted cover-up concluded: "Since early last decade, Defense Ministry teams have scoured local archives and removed troves of historic documents to conceal proof of the Nakba, including Israeli eyewitness reports at the time" (Shezaf, "Burying the Nakba: How Israel Systematically Hides Evidence of 1948 Expulsion of Arabs").”) (Note: Abu-Laban, Yasmeen; Bakan, Abigail B. (July 2022). "Anti-Palestinian Racism and Racial Gaslighting". The Political Quarterly, Vol. 93, Issue 3, p. 511: "Palestinians have long known what happened to them in 1948 and its very human costs. However, the work of the 'new' (or revisionist) Israeli historians from the late 1970s also challenged the official state narrative of a miraculous wartime victory through access to material in the Israeli archives. This has established what Ilan Pappé has summarised as the 'ethnic cleansing of Palestine', a process involving massacres and expulsions at gunpoint. In light of the ever-growing historiography, serious scholarship has left little debate about what happened in 1948. [...] However, Nakba denial remains a political issue of the highest order.) (Note: Laila Parsons, McGill University, 2009, Review of Ilan Pappé's 'The Ethnic Cleansing of Palestine', "Ilan Pappe has added another work to the many that have already been written in English on the 1948 Arab-Israeli War and the expulsion of more than 750,000 Palestinians from their homes. These include works by Walid Khalidi, Simha Flapan, Nafez Nazzal, Benny Morris, Nur Masalha, and Norman Finkelstein, among others. All but one of these authors (Morris) would probably agree with Pappe’s position that what happened to the Palestinians in 1948 fits the definition of ethnic cleansing, and it certainly is not news to Palestinians themselves, who have always known what happened to them.") Scholars widely describe the event as ethnic cleansing, although some disagree. Factors involved in the exodus include direct expulsions by Israeli forces; destruction of Arab villages; psychological warfare including terrorism; massacres such as the widely publicized Deir Yassin massacre, which caused many to flee out of fear; crop burning; (Note: Pappe, I. (1999). Were they expelled?: The history, historiography and relevance of the Palestinian refugee problem. In G. Karmi & E. Cotran (Eds.), The Palestinian exodus, 1948–1988(pp. 37–61). London: Ithaca Press – "Where expulsion failed, transfer was encouraged, by every possible means (even by setting fire to the fields of Palestinian villages considered wealthy or by cutting water supply to city neighborhoods). Weitz convinced the Israeli government in May 1948 to confiscate any looted Arab harvest for the needs of the newly born state. This policy of burning fields or confiscating them continued throughout the summer of 1948.") (Note: Morris 2004 "While before May, burning Arab crops was mainly a Haganah means of retaliation for Arab attacks, during May–June the destruction of the fields hardened into a set policy designed to demoralise the villagers, hurt them economically and, perhaps, precipitate their exodus.") typhoid epidemics in some areas caused by Israeli well-poisoning; and the collapse of Palestinian leadership including the demoralizing impact of wealthier classes fleeing.

Later, a series of land and property laws passed by the first Israeli government prevented Arabs who had left from returning to their homes or claiming their property. They and many of their descendants remain refugees. The existence of the Israeli Law of Return allowing for immigration and naturalization of any Jewish person and their family to Israel, while a Palestinian right of return has been denied, has been cited as evidence for the charge that Israel practices apartheid. The status of the refugees, particularly whether Israel will allow them to return to their homes, or compensate them, are key issues in the ongoing Israeli–Palestinian conflict.

== History ==
The history of the Palestinian exodus is closely tied to the events of the war in Palestine, which lasted from 1947 to 1949, and to the political events preceding it. The first phase of that war began on 30 November 1947, a day after the United Nations adopted the Partition Plan for Palestine, which split the territory into Jewish and Arab states, and an international Jerusalem.

In September 1949, the United Nations Conciliation Commission for Palestine estimated 711,000 Palestinian refugees existed outside Israel, with about one-quarter of the estimated 160,000 Palestinian Arabs remaining in Israel as "internal refugees".

=== December 1947 – March 1948 ===
In the first few months of the civil war, the climate in the Mandate of Palestine became volatile, although throughout this period both Arab and Jewish leaders tried to limit hostilities. According to historian Benny Morris, the period was marked by Palestinian Arab attacks and Jewish defensiveness, increasingly punctuated by Jewish reprisals. Simha Flapan wrote that attacks by the Irgun and Lehi resulted in Palestinian Arab retaliation and condemnation. Jewish reprisal operations were directed against villages and neighborhoods from which attacks against Jews were believed to have originated.

The retaliations were more damaging than the provoking attack and included killing of armed and unarmed men, destruction of houses and sometimes expulsion of inhabitants. The Zionist groups of Irgun and Lehi reverted to their 1937–1939 strategy of indiscriminate attacks by placing bombs and throwing grenades into crowded places such as bus stops, shopping centres and markets. Their attacks on British forces reduced British troops' ability and willingness to protect Jewish traffic. General conditions deteriorated: the economic situation became unstable, and unemployment grew. Some Palestinian Arab leaders sent their families abroad.

Clickable map of the depopulated locations – i.e. the source of the refugees

Yoav Gelber wrote that the Arab Liberation Army embarked on a systematic evacuation of non-combatants from several frontier villages in order to turn them into military strongholds. Arab depopulation occurred most in villages close to Jewish settlements and in vulnerable neighborhoods in Haifa, Jaffa and West Jerusalem. The more impoverished inhabitants of these neighborhoods generally fled to other parts of the city. Those who could afford to flee further away did so, expecting to return when the troubles were over. By the end of March 1948 thirty villages were depopulated of their Palestinian Arab population. Approximately 100,000 Palestinian Arabs had fled to Arab parts of Palestine, such as Gaza, Beersheba, Haifa, Nazareth, Nablus, Jaffa and Bethlehem.

Some had left the country altogether, to Jordan, Lebanon and Egypt. Other sources speak of 30,000 Palestinian Arabs. Many of these were Palestinian Arab leaders and middle- and upper-class Palestinian Arab families from urban areas. Around 22 March, the Arab governments agreed that their consulates in Palestine would issue entry visas only to old people, women, children and the sick. On 29–30 March the intelligence service of Haganah, the main Zionist paramilitary, reported that "the Arab Higher Committee was no longer approving exit permits for fear of [causing] panic in the country."

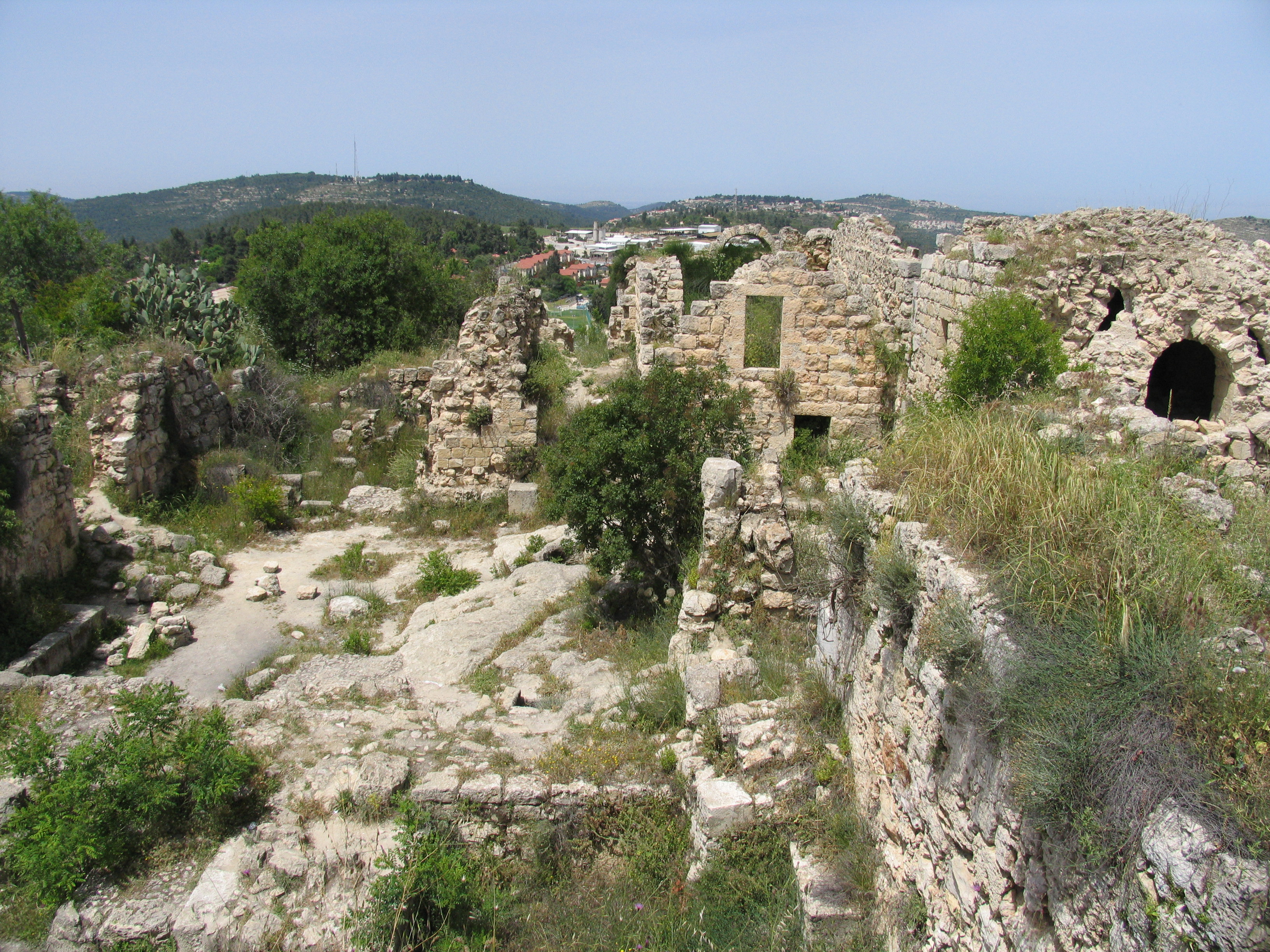
Ruins of the Palestinian village of Suba, near Jerusalem, overlooking Kibbutz Zova, which was built on the village lands

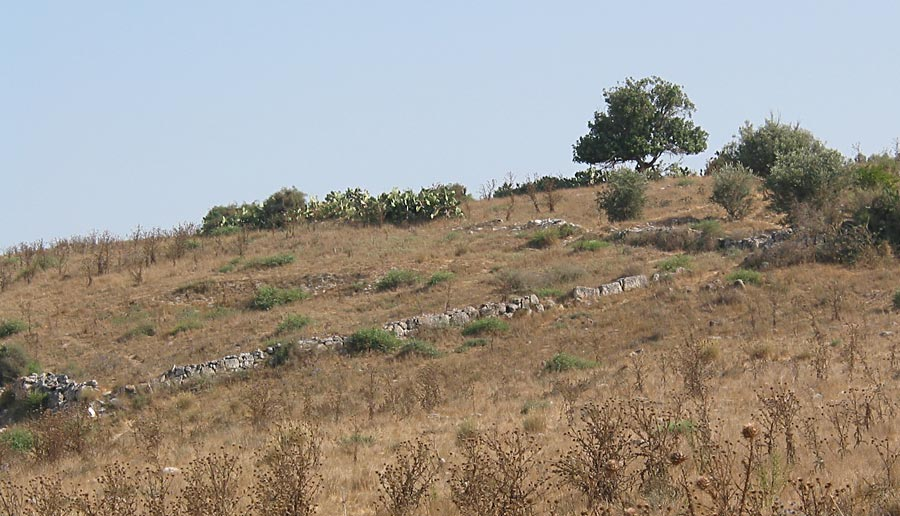
Ruins of the former Arab village of Bayt Jibrin, inside the green line west of Hebron

The Haganah was instructed to avoid spreading the conflagration by stopping indiscriminate attacks and provoking British intervention.

On 18 December 1947, the Haganah approved an aggressive defense strategy, which in practice meant a limited implementation of "Plan May"; this, also known as "Plan Gimel" or "Plan C", produced in May 1946, was the Haganah master plan for the defence of the Yishuv in the event that, the moment the British were gone, new troubles broke out. Plan Gimel included retaliation for assaults on Jewish houses and roads.

In early January the Haganah adopted Operation Zarzir, a scheme to assassinate leaders affiliated to Amin al-Husayni, placing the blame on other Arab leaders, but in practice few resources were devoted to the project, and the only attempted killing was of Nimr al Khatib.

The only authorised expulsion at this time took place at Qisarya, south of Haifa, where Palestinian Arabs were evicted and their houses destroyed on 19–20 February 1948. In attacks that were not authorised in advance, several communities were expelled by the Haganah and several others were chased away by the Irgun.

According to Ilan Pappé, the Zionists organised a campaign of threats, consisting of the distribution of threatening leaflets, "violent reconnaissance" and, after the arrival of mortars, the shelling of Arab villages and neighborhoods. Pappé also wrote that the Haganah shifted its policy from retaliation to offensive initiatives.

During the "long seminar", a meeting of Ben-Gurion with his chief advisors in January 1948, the main point was that it was desirable to "transfer" as many Arabs as possible out of Jewish territory, and the discussion focussed mainly on the implementation. The experience gained in a number of attacks in February 1948, notably those on Qisarya and Sa'sa', was used in the development of a plan detailing how enemy population centers should be handled. According to Pappé, Plan Dalet was the master plan for the expulsion of the Palestinians. According to Gelber, Plan Dalet instructions were to expel conquered villagers outside the borders of the Jewish state if met with resistance; if no resistance, the residents could stay put, under military rule.

Palestinian belligerency in these first few months was "disorganised, sporadic and localised and for months remained chaotic and uncoordinated, if not undirected". Husayni lacked the resources to mount a full-scale assault on the Yishuv, and restricted himself to sanctioning minor attacks and to tightening the economic boycott. The British claimed that Arab rioting might well have subsided had the Jews not retaliated with firearms.

Overall, Morris concludes that during this period the "Arab evacuees from the towns and villages left largely because of Jewish—Haganah, IZL or LHI—attacks or fear of impending attack" but that only "an extremely small, almost insignificant number of the refugees during this early period left because of Haganah or IZL or LHI expulsion orders or forceful 'advice' to that effect."

=== April–June 1948 ===
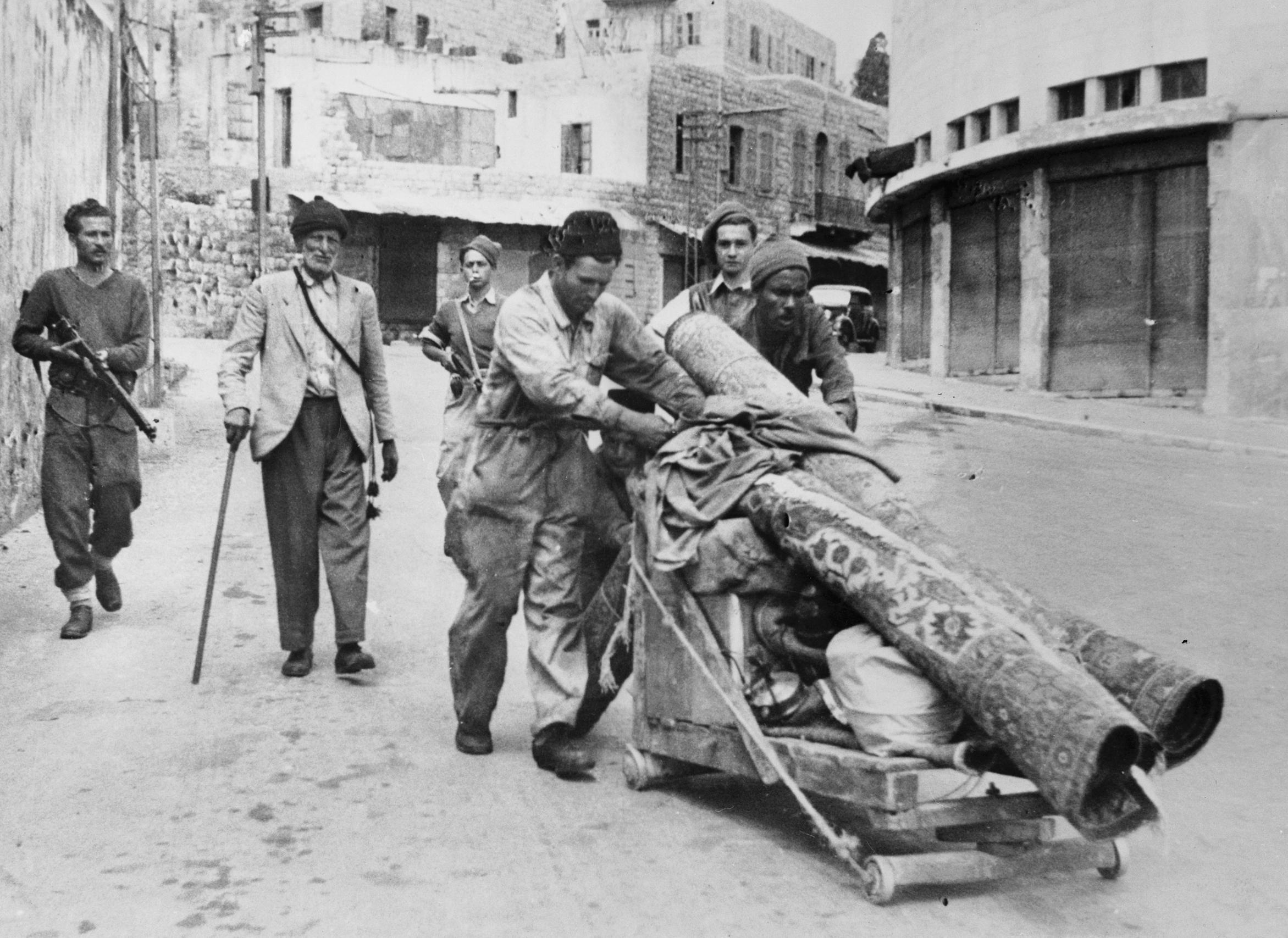
Arabs leaving Haifa as Jewish forces enter the city

By 1 May 1948, two weeks before the Israeli Declaration of Independence, nearly 175,000 Palestinians (approximately 25%) had already fled.

The fighting in these months was concentrated in the Jerusalem–Tel Aviv area, On 9 April, the Deir Yassin massacre and the rumours that followed it spread fear among the Palestinians. Next, the Haganah defeated local militia in Tiberias. On 21–22 April in Haifa, after the Haganah waged a day-and-a-half battle including psychological warfare a mass flight followed. Finally Irgun, under Menachim Begin, fired mortars on the infrastructure in Jaffa. Combined with the fear inspired by Deir Yassin, each of these military actions resulted in panicked Palestinian evacuations.

The significance of the attacks by underground military groups Irgun and Lehi on Deir Yassin is underscored by accounts on all sides. Meron Benvenisti regards Deir Yassin as "a turning point in the annals of the destruction of the Arab landscape".

Israel began engaging in biological warfare in April, poisoning the water supplies of certain villages, including a successful operation that caused a typhoid epidemic in Acre in early May, and an unsuccessful attempt in Gaza that was foiled by the Egyptians in late May.

==== Haifa ====
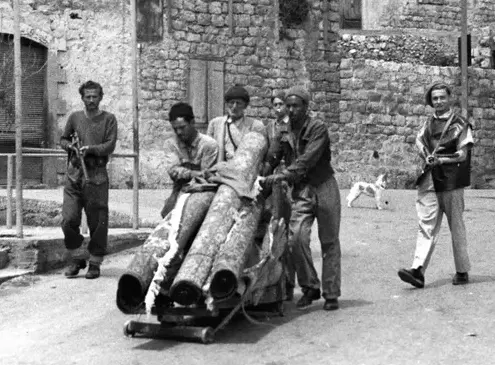
Palestinians leaving Haifa accompanied by armed Haganah personnel.

Palestinians fled the city of Haifa en masse, in one of the most notable flights of this stage. Historian Efraim Karsh writes that not only had half of the Arab community fled the city before the final battle in late April 1948, but another 5,000–15,000 left voluntarily during the fighting while the rest, some 15,000–25,000, were ordered to leave, as was initially claimed by an Israeli source, on the instructions of the Arab Higher Committee.

Karsh concludes that there was no Jewish grand design to force this departure, and that in fact the Haifa Jewish leadership tried to convince some Arabs to stay, to no avail. Walid Khalidi disputes this account, saying that two independent studies, which analysed CIA and BBC intercepts of radio broadcasts from the region, concluded that no orders or instructions were given by the Arab Higher Committee. Benny Morris agrees with Karsh, while also acknowledging "an undercurrent of expulsive thinking."

According to Morris, "The Haganah mortar attacks of 21–22 April [on Haifa] were primarily designed to break Arab morale in order to bring about a swift collapse of resistance and speedy surrender. [...] But clearly the offensive, and especially the mortaring, precipitated the exodus. The three-inch mortars "opened up on the market square [where there was] a great crowd [...] a great panic took hold. The multitude burst into the port, pushed aside the policemen, charged the boats and began to flee the town", as the official Haganah history later put it". According to Pappé, this mortar barrage was deliberately aimed at civilians to precipitate their flight from Haifa, while Morris denies this claim.

The Haganah broadcast a warning to Arabs in Haifa on 21 April: "that unless they sent away 'infiltrated dissidents' they would be advised to evacuate all women and children, because they would be strongly attacked from now on".

Commenting on the use of "psychological warfare broadcasts" and military tactics in Haifa, Benny Morris writes:

Throughout the Haganah made effective use of Arabic language broadcasts and loudspeaker vans. Haganah Radio announced that "the day of judgement had arrived" and called on inhabitants to "kick out the foreign criminals" and to "move away from every house and street, from every neighbourhood occupied by foreign criminals". The Haganah broadcasts called on the populace to "evacuate the women, the children and the old immediately, and send them to a safe haven". Jewish tactics in the battle were designed to stun and quickly overpower opposition; demoralisation was a primary aim. It was deemed just as important to the outcome as the physical destruction of the Arab units. The mortar barrages and the psychological warfare broadcasts and announcements, and the tactics employed by the infantry companies, advancing from house to house, were all geared to this goal. The orders of Carmeli's 22nd Battalion were "to kill every [adult male] Arab encountered" and to set alight with fire-bombs "all objectives that can be set alight. I am sending you posters in Arabic; disperse on route."

By mid-May there were only ~4,000 Palestinians in Haifa. This remaining Arab population was relocated to the neighbourhood of Wadi Nisnas, in a process that has been described as "ghettoization". A systematic destruction of Arab housing in certain areas, which had been planned before the War, was implemented by Haifa's Technical and Urban Development departments in cooperation with the IDF's city commander Ya'akov Lublini.

==== Further events ====
According to Glazer (1980, p. 111), from 15 May 1948 onwards, expulsion of Palestinians became a regular practice. Avnery (1971), explaining the Zionist rationale, says,

I believe that during this phase, the eviction of Arab civilians had become an aim of David Ben-Gurion and his government... UN opinion could very well be disregarded. Peace with the Arabs seemed out of the question, considering the extreme nature of the Arab propaganda. In this situation, it was easy for people like Ben-Gurion to believe the capture of uninhabited territory was both necessary for security reasons and desirable for the homogeneity of the new Hebrew state.

Based on research of numerous archives, Morris provides an analysis of Haganah-induced flight:

Undoubtedly, as was understood by IDF intelligence, the most important single factor in the exodus of April–June was Jewish attack. This is demonstrated clearly by the fact that each exodus occurred during or in the immediate wake of military assault. No town was abandoned by the bulk of its population before the Haganah/IZL assault... The closer drew the 15 May British withdrawal deadline and the prospect of invasion by Arab states, the readier became commanders to resort to "cleansing" operations and expulsions to rid their rear areas. [R]elatively few commanders faced the moral dilemma of having to carry out the expulsion clauses. Townspeople and villagers usually fled their homes before or during battle... though (Haganah commanders) almost invariably prevented inhabitants, who had initially fled, from returning home...

Edgar O'Ballance, a military historian, adds,

Israeli vans with loudspeakers drove through the streets ordering all the inhabitants to evacuate immediately, and such as were reluctant to leave were forcibly ejected from their homes by the triumphant Israelis whose policy was now openly one of clearing out all the Arab civil population before them... From the surrounding villages and hamlets, during the next two or three days, all the inhabitants were uprooted and set off on the road to Ramallah... No longer was there any "reasonable persuasion". Bluntly, the Arab inhabitants were ejected and forced to flee into Arab territory... Wherever the Israeli troops advanced into Arab country the Arab population was bulldozed out in front of them.

After the fall of Haifa the villages on the slopes of Mount Carmel had been harassing the Jewish traffic on the main road to Haifa. A decision was made on 9 May 1948 to expel or subdue the villages of Kafr Saba, al-Tira, Qaqun, Qalansuwa and Tantura. On 11 May 1948 Ben-Gurion convened the "Consultancy"; the outcome of the meeting is confirmed in a letter to commanders of the Haganah Brigades telling them that the Arab legion's offensive should not distract their troops from the principal tasks: "the cleansing of Palestine remained the prime objective of Plan Dalet."

The attention of the commanders of the Alexandroni Brigade was turned to reducing the Mount Carmel pocket. Tantura, being on the coast, gave the Carmel villages access to the outside world and so was chosen as the point to surround the Carmel villages as a part of the Coastal Clearing offensive operation in the beginning of the 1948 Arab–Israeli War.

On the night of 22–23 May 1948, one week and one day after the declaration of Independence of the State of Israel, the coastal village of Tantura was attacked and occupied by the 33rd Battalion of the Alexandroni Brigade of the Haganah. The village of Tantura was not given the option of surrender and the initial report spoke of dozens of villagers killed, with 300 adult male prisoners and 200 women and children. Many of the villagers fled to Fureidis (previously captured) and to Arab-held territory. The captured women of Tantura were moved to Fureidis, and on 31 May Brechor Shitrit, Minister of Minority Affairs of the provisional Government of Israel, sought permission to expel the refugee women of Tantura from Fureidis as the number of refugees in Fureidis was causing problems of overcrowding and sanitation.

A report from the military intelligence SHAI of the Haganah titled "The emigration of Palestinian Arabs in the period 1/12/1947-1/6/1948", dated 30 June 1948, affirms that:

At least 55% of the total of the exodus was caused by our (Haganah/IDF) operations. To this figure, the report's compilers add the operations of the Irgun and Lehi, which "directly (caused) some 15%... of the emigration". A further 2% was attributed to explicit expulsion orders issued by Israeli troops, and 1% to their psychological warfare. This leads to a figure of 73% for departures caused directly by the Israelis. In addition, the report attributes 22% of the departures to "fears" and "a crisis of confidence" affecting the Palestinian population. As for Arab calls for flight, these were reckoned to be significant in only 5% of cases...

According to Morris's estimates, 250,000 to 300,000 Palestinians left Israel during this stage. "Keesing's Contemporary Archives" in London place the total number of refugees before Israel's independence at 300,000.

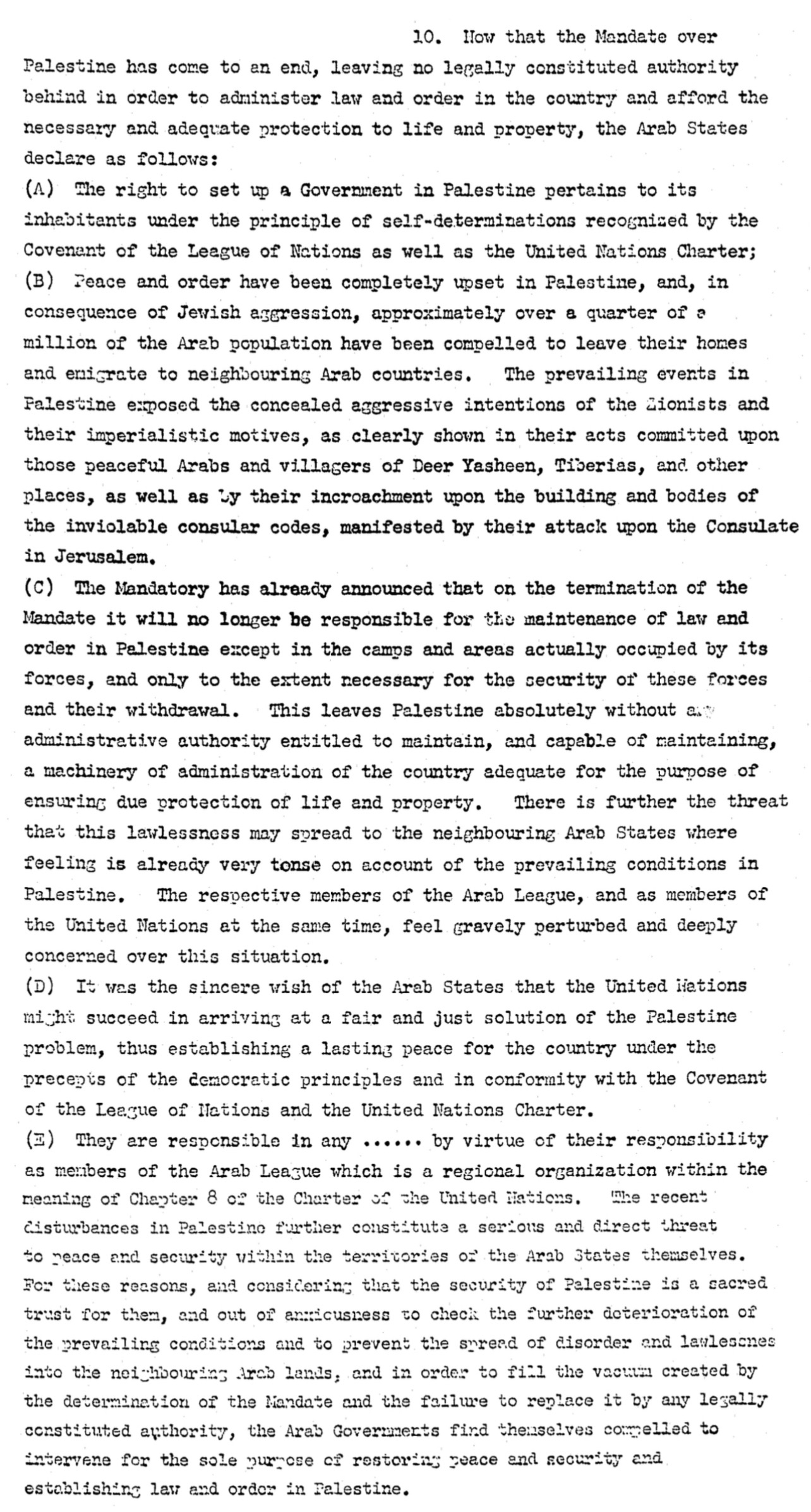
Clause 10 of the 15 May 1948 Arab League cablegram stating the expulsion of, at that point, 250,000 Palestinians, as a reason for their entry into the territory

In Clause 10.(b) of the cablegram from the Secretary-General of the League of Arab States to the UN Secretary-General of 15 May 1948 justifying the intervention by the Arab States, the Secretary-General of the League alleged that "approximately over a quarter of a million of the Arab population have been compelled to leave their homes and emigrate to neighbouring Arab countries."

=== July–October 1948 ===
Israeli operations named Dani and Dekel that broke the truce were the start of the third phase of expulsions. The largest single expulsion of the war began in Lydda and Ramla on 14 July under Operation Dani when 60,000 inhabitants of the two cities (nearly 8.6% of the whole exodus) were forcibly expelled on the orders of David Ben-Gurion and Yitzhak Rabin in events that came to be known as the "Lydda Death March".

According to Flapan (1987, pp. 13–14) in Ben-Gurion's view Ramlah and Lydda constituted a special danger because their proximity might encourage co-operation between the Egyptian army, which had started its attack on Kibbutz Negbah, near Ramlah, and the Arab Legion, which had taken the Lydda police station. However the author considers that Operation Dani revealed that no such co-operation existed.

In Flapan's opinion, "in Lydda, the exodus took place on foot. In Ramlah, the IDF provided buses and trucks. Originally, all males had been rounded up and enclosed in a compound, but after some shooting was heard, and construed by Ben-Gurion to be the beginning of an Arab Legion counteroffensive, he stopped the arrests and ordered the speedy eviction of all the Arabs, including women, children, and the elderly." In explanation, Flapan cites that Ben-Gurion said that "those who made war on us bear responsibility after their defeat."

Rabin wrote in his memoirs:

What would they do with the 50,000 civilians in the two cities... Not even Ben-Gurion could offer a solution, and during the discussion at operation headquarters, he remained silent, as was his habit in such situations. Clearly, we could not leave [Lydda's] hostile and armed populace in our rear, where it could endanger the supply route [to the troops who were] advancing eastward... Allon repeated the question: What is to be done with the population? Ben-Gurion waved his hand in a gesture that said: Drive them out!... "Driving out" is a term with a harsh ring... Psychologically, this was one of the most difficult actions we undertook. The population of [Lydda] did not leave willingly. There was no way of avoiding the use of force and warning shots in order to make the inhabitants march the 10 to 15 miles to the point where they met up with the legion. ("Soldier of Peace", pp. 140–141)

Flapan maintains that events in Nazareth, although ending differently, point to the existence of a definite pattern of expulsion. On 16 July, three days after the Lydda and Ramlah evictions, the city of Nazareth surrendered to the IDF. The officer in command, a Canadian Jew named Ben Dunkelman, had signed the surrender agreement on behalf of the Israeli army along with Chaim Laskov (then a brigadier general, later IDF chief of staff). The agreement assured the civilians that they would not be harmed, but the next day, Laskov handed Dunkelman an order to evacuate the population, which Dunkelman refused.

Additionally, widespread looting and several cases of rape took place during the evacuation. In total, about 100,000 Palestinians became refugees in this stage according to Morris.

Glazer quotes the testimony of Count Bernadotte, the UN mediator in Palestine, who reported that "the exodus of the Palestinian Arabs resulted from panic created by fighting in their communities, by rumours concerning real or alleged acts of terrorism, or expulsion. Almost the whole of the Arab population fled or was expelled from the area under Jewish occupation."

On 26 September, Yosef Weitz alerted Ben-Gurion to the problem of masses of Palestinians endeavouring to return to their land in Israel or to lands Israel was about to take control of. On being asked how to deal with the problem, Weitz advocated a policy of endless 'harassment' ([hatrada]). Later on the same day, his cabinet turned down his proposal that Israel launch an invasion against the Arab Legion in order to wrest control over part, or all, of the West Bank where the latter was entrenched. It was in this context that Ben-Gurion then ordered Yigael Yadin extend Israel's biological warfare operations abroad, beginning with the poisoning of Cairo's water network with toxic bacteria. Both this and other projects to take similar measures in Syria and Lebanon, for a variety of reasons, were never activated.

=== October 1948 – March 1949 ===
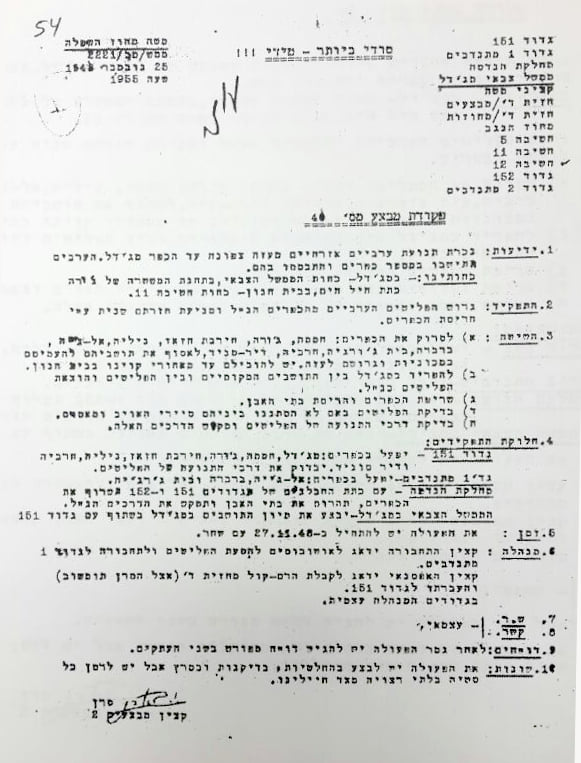
IDF operation order for the destruction of Palestinian villages in November 1948

This period of the exodus was characterized by Israeli military accomplishments; Operation Yoav, in October, cleared the road to the Negev, culminating in the capture of Beersheba; Operation Ha-Har that same month which cleared the Jerusalem Corridor from pockets of resistance; Operation Hiram, at the end of October, resulted in the capture of the Upper Galilee; Operation Horev in December 1948 and Operation Uvda in March 1949, completed the capture of the Negev (the Negev had been allotted to the Jewish State by the United Nations) these operations were met with resistance from the Palestinian Arabs who were to become refugees. The Israeli military activities were confined to the Galilee and the sparsely populated Negev desert. It was clear to the villages in the Galilee, that if they left, return was far from imminent. Therefore, far fewer villages spontaneously depopulated than previously. Most of the Palestinian exodus was due to a clear, direct cause: expulsion and deliberate harassment, as Morris writes "commanders were clearly bent on driving out the population in the area they were conquering".

During Operation Hiram in the upper Galilee, Israeli military commanders received the order: "Do all in your power to clear quickly and immediately from the areas conquered all hostile elements in accordance with the orders issued. The inhabitants should be assisted to leave the conquered areas." (31 October 1948, Moshe Carmel) The UN's acting Mediator, Ralph Bunche, reported that United Nations Observers had recorded extensive looting of villages in Galilee by Israeli forces, who carried away goats, sheep and mules. This looting, United Nations Observers reported, appeared to have been systematic as army trucks were used for transportation. The situation, states the report, created a new influx of refugees into Lebanon. Israeli forces, he stated, have occupied the area in Galilee formerly occupied by Kaukji's forces, and have crossed the Lebanese frontier. Bunche goes on to say "that Israeli forces now hold positions inside the south-east corner of Lebanon, involving some fifteen Lebanese villages which are occupied by small Israeli detachments."

According to Morris, 200,000–230,000 Palestinians fled during Operation Hiram and Operation Yoav. According to Ilan Pappé, "In a matter of seven months, five hundred and thirty one villages were destroyed and eleven urban neighborhoods emptied [...] The mass expulsion was accompanied by massacres, rape and [the] imprisonment of men [...] in labor camps for periods [of] over a year."

== Contemporary mediation and the Lausanne Conference ==
=== UN mediation ===
The United Nations, using the offices of the United Nations Truce Supervision Organization and the Mixed Armistice Commissions, was involved in the conflict from the very beginning. In the autumn of 1948 the refugee problem was a fact and possible solutions were discussed. Count Folke Bernadotte said on 16 September:

No settlement can be just and complete if recognition is not accorded to the right of the Arab refugee to return to the home from which he has been dislodged. It would be an offence against the principles of elemental justice if these innocent victims of the conflict were denied the right to return to their homes while Jewish immigrants flow into Palestine, and indeed, offer the threat of permanent replacement of the Arab refugees who have been rooted in the land for centuries.

UN General Assembly Resolution 194, passed on 11 December 1948 and reaffirmed every year since, was the first resolution that called for Israel to let the refugees return:

the refugees wishing to return to their homes and live at peace with their neighbours should be permitted to do so at the earliest practicable date, and that compensation should be paid for the property of those choosing not to return and for loss of or damage to property which, under principles of international law or in equity, should be made good by the Governments or authorities responsible.

=== Lausanne Conference of 1949 ===
At the start of the Lausanne Conference of 1949, on 12 May 1949, Israel agreed in principle to allow the return of some of the Palestinian refugees. At the same time, Israel became a member of the U.N. upon the passage of United Nations General Assembly Resolution 273 on 11 May 1949, which read, in part,

Noting furthermore the declaration by the State of Israel that it "unreservedly accepts the obligations of the United Nations Charter and undertakes to honour them from the day when it becomes a member of the United Nations".

Instead Israel made an offer of allowing 100,000 of the refugees to return to the area, though not necessarily to their homes, including 25,000 who had returned surreptitiously and 10,000 family-reunion cases. The proposal was conditional on a peace treaty that would allow Israel to retain the territory it had captured which had been allocated to the Arab state by the United Nations Partition Plan for Palestine, and, contrary to Israel's UN acceptance promise, on the Arab states absorbing the remaining 550,000–650,000 refugees. The Arab states rejected the proposal on both legal, moral and political grounds, and Israel quickly withdrew its limited offer.

Benny Morris, in his 2004 book, The Birth of the Palestinian Refugee Problem Revisited, summarizes it from his perspective:

In retrospect, it appeared that at Lausanne was lost the best and perhaps only chance for a solution of the refugee problem, if not for the achievement of a comprehensive Middle East settlement. But the basic incompatibility of the initial starting positions and the unwillingness of the two sides to move, and to move quickly, towards a compromise—born of Arab rejectionism and a deep feeling of humiliation, and of Israeli drunkenness with victory and physical needs determined largely by the Jewish refugee influx—doomed the "conference" from the start. American pressure on both sides, lacking a sharp, determined cutting edge, failed to budge sufficiently either Jew or Arab. The "100,000 Offer" was a classic of too little, too late.

== Results of the Palestinian exodus ==
The expulsion of Palestinians in 1947–49 resulted in the significant depopulation of territory occupied by Israel, in which "about 90 percent of the Palestinians were ethnically cleansed – many by psychological warfare and /or military pressure and a large number at gunpoint." Historic Arabic place names were replaced with Hebrew names, based on biblical names.

=== Economic damage ===
As towns and villages were either conquered or abandoned in the conflict, looting by Jewish forces and residents was widespread. In the aftermath, on 24 July 1948, David Ben-Gurion criticised the looting: "It turns out that most of the Jews are thieves... I say this deliberately and simply, because unfortunately it is true." (Note: Ben-Gurion continued: "People from the Jezreel Valley stole! The pioneers of the pioneers, parents of Palmach children! And everyone took part in it, baruch Hashem, the people of [Moshav] Nahalal!... This is a general blow. It’s appalling, because it shows a basic flaw. Theft and robbery – and where does this come to us from? Why have the people of the land – builders, creators, pioneers – come to deeds like this? What happened?") Netiva Ben-Yehuda, a Palmach commander, likened the pillaging she observed in Tiberias to the classic behavior seen by their oppressors during anti-Jewish pogroms in Europe:

Such pictures were known to us. It was the way things had always been done to us, in the Holocaust, throughout the world war, and all the pogroms. Oy, how well we knew those pictures. And here – here, we were doing these awful things to others. We loaded everything onto the van – with a terrible trembling of the hands. And that wasn't because of the weight. Even now my hands are shaking, just from writing about it.

=== Abandoned, evacuated and destroyed Palestinian localities ===
Several authors have conducted studies on the number of Palestinian localities that were abandoned, evacuated or destroyed during the 1947–1949 period. Based on their respective calculations, the table below summarises their information.

Abandoned, evacuated or destroyed Palestinian localities (comparative figures)
| Reference | Towns | Villages | Tribes | Total |
|---|---|---|---|---|
| Morris | 10 | 342 | 17 | 369 |
| Khalidi | 1 | 400 | 17 | 418 |
| Abu Sitta | 13 | 419 | 99 | 531 |

Source: The table data was taken from Ruling Palestine, A History of the Legally Sanctioned Jewish-Israeli Seizure of Land and Housing in Palestine. COHRE & BADIL, May 2005, p. 34.
Note: For information on methodologies; see: Morris, Benny (1987): The Birth of the Palestinian Refugee Problem, 1947–1949. New York: Cambridge University Press, 1987; Khalidi, Walid (ed.): All That Remains: The Palestinian Villages Occupied and Depopulated by Israel in 1948. Washington, D.C.: Institute for Palestine Studies, 1992, App. IV, pp. xix, 585–586; and Sitta, Salman Abu: The Palestinian Nakba 1948. London: The Palestinian Return Centre, 2000.

According to the Centre on Housing Rights and Evictions (COHRE) and BADIL, Morris's list of affected localities, the shortest of the three, includes towns but excludes other localities cited by Khalidi or Abu Sitta. The six sources compared in Khalidi's study have in common 296 of the villages listed as destroyed or depopulated. Sixty other villages are cited in all but one source. Of the total of 418 localities cited in Khalidi, 292 (70 percent) were completely destroyed and 90 (22 percent) "largely destroyed". COHRE and BADIL also note that other sources refer to an additional 151 localities that are omitted from Khalidi's study for various reasons (for example, major cities and towns that were depopulated, as well as some Bedouin encampments and villages "vacated" before the start of hostilities). Abu Sitta's list includes tribes in Beersheba that lost lands; most of these were omitted from Khalidi's work.

Another study, involving field research and comparisons with British and other documents, concludes that 472 Palestinian habitations (including towns and villages) were destroyed in 1948. It notes that the devastation was virtually complete in some sub-districts. For example, it points out that 96.0% of the villages in the Jaffa area were totally destroyed, as were 90.0% of those in Tiberias, 90.3% of those in Safad, and 95.9% of those in Beisan. It also extrapolates from 1931 British census data to estimate that over 70,280 Palestinian houses were destroyed in this period.

In another study, Abu Sitta shows the following findings in eight distinct phases of the depopulation of Palestine between 1947 and 1949. His findings are summarized in the table below:

Information on the depopulation of Palestinian towns and villages (1947–1949)
| Phase: | No. of destroyed/depopulated localities | No. of refugees | Jewish/Israeli lands (km^{2}) |
|---|---|---|---|
| 29 Nov. 1947 – Mar. 1948 | 30 | >22,600* | 1,159.4 |
| Apr. – 13 May 1948 (Tiberias, Jaffa, Haifa, Safed, etc.) | 199 | >400,000 | 3,363.9 |
| 15 May – 11 June 1948 (an additional 90 villages) | 290 | >500,000 | 3,943.1 |
| 12 June – 18 July 1948 (Lydda/Ramleh, Nazareth, etc.) | 378 | >628,000 | 5,224.2 |
| 19 July – 24 Oct. 1948 (Galilee and southern areas) | 418 | >664,000 | 7,719.6 |
| 24 Oct. – 5 Nov. 1948 (Galilee, etc.) | 465 | >730,000 | 10,099.6 |
| 5 Nov. 1948 – 18 Jan. 1949 (Negev, etc.) | 481 | >754,000 | 12,366.3 |
| 19 Jan. – 20 July 1949 (Negev, etc.) | 531 | >804,000 | 20,350 |

* Other sources put this figure at over 70,000.
Source: The table data was taken from Ruling Palestine, A History of the Legally Sanctioned Jewish-Israeli Seizure of Land and Housing in Palestine. COHRE & BADIL, May 2005, p. 34. The source being: Abu Sitta, Salman (2001): "From Refugees to Citizens at Home". London: Palestine Land Society and Palestinian Return Centre, 2001.

=== Hebraization of Palestinian place names ===
Hebrew-language names were coined for the place-names of Palestine after the establishment of Israel following the 1948 Palestinian expulsion and flight. Palestinians consider the Hebraization of place-names in Palestine part of the Palestinian Nakba, while Zionists consider this to be a way of emphasizing historical continuity and a Jewish connection to the region. In certain areas of Israel, particularly the mixed cities, there is a growing trend to restore the original Arabic street names that were Hebraized after 1948.

=== Palestinian refugees ===
Palestinian refugees
Total population
- 4.9 million (Registered with UNRWA—including descendants and re-settled)

Regions with significant populations
- Gaza Strip, Jordan, West Bank, Lebanon, Syria

Languages
- Arabic

Religion
- Islam and Christianity

On 11 December 1948, 12 months prior to UNRWA's establishment, United Nations General Assembly Resolution 194 was adopted. The resolution accepted the definition of Palestinian refugees as "persons of Arab origin who, after 29 November 1947, left territory at present under the control of the Israel authorities and who were Palestinian citizens at that date" and; "Persons of Arab origin who left the said territory after 6 August 1924 and before 29 November 1947 and who at that latter date were Palestinian citizens; 2. Persons of Arab origin who left the territory in question before 6 August 1924 and who, having opted for Palestinian citizenship, retained that citizenship up to 29 November 1947"

UNRWA was established under UNGA resolution 302 (IV) of 8 December 1949. It defines refugees qualifying for UNRWA's services as "persons whose normal place of residence was Palestine between June 1946 and May 1948, who lost both their homes and means of livelihood as a result of the 1948 Arab–Israeli conflict" and also covers the descendants of persons who became refugees in 1948. The UNRWA mandate does not extend to final status.

The final 1949 UNRWA estimate of the refugee count was 726,000, but the number of registered refugees was 914,000. The U.N. Conciliation Commission explained that the number was inflated by "duplication of ration cards, addition of persons who have been displaced from area other than Israel-held areas and of persons who, although not displaced, are destitute," and the UNRWA additionally noted that "all births are eagerly announced, the deaths wherever possible are passed over in silence," as well as the fact that "the birthrate is high in any case, a net addition of 30,000 names a year." By June 1951, UNRWA had reduced the number of registered refugees to 876,000 after many false and duplicate registrations had been weeded out.

Today the number who qualify for UNRWA's services has grown to over 4 million, one third of whom live in the West Bank and Gaza; slightly less than one third in Jordan; 17% in Syria and Lebanon (Bowker, 2003, p. 72) and around 15% in other Arab and Western countries. Approximately 1 million refugees have no form of identification other than an UNRWA identification card.

=== Prevention of Infiltration Law ===
Following the emergence of the Palestinian refugee problem after the 1948 Arab–Israeli war, many Palestinians tried, in one way or another, to return to their homes. For some time these practices continued to embarrass the Israeli authorities until they passed the Prevention of Infiltration Law, which defines offenses of armed and non-armed infiltration to Israel and from Israel to hostile neighboring countries. According to Arab Israeli writer Sabri Jiryis, the purpose of the law was to prevent Palestinians from returning to Israel, those who did so being regarded as infiltrators.

According to Kirshbaum, over the years the Israeli Government has continued to cancel and modify some of the Defence (Emergency) Regulations of 1945, but mostly it has added more as it has continued to extend its declared state of emergency. For example, even though the Prevention of Infiltration Law of 1954 is not labelled as an official "Emergency Regulation", it extends the applicability of the "Defence (Emergency) Regulation 112" of 1945 giving the Minister of Defence extraordinary powers of deportation for accused infiltrators even before they are convicted (Articles 30 & 32), and makes itself subject to cancellation when the Knesset ends the State of Emergency upon which all of the Emergency Regulations are dependent.

=== Land and property laws ===
Following its establishment, Israel designed a system of law that legitimised both a continuation and a consolidation of the nationalisation of land and property, a process that it had begun decades earlier. For the first few years of Israel's existence, many of the new laws continued to be rooted in earlier Ottoman and British law. These laws were later amended or replaced altogether.

The first challenge facing Israel was to transform its control over land into legal ownership. This was the motivation underlying the passing of several of the first group of land laws.

==== Initial "Emergency Laws" and "Regulations" ====
Among the more important initial laws was article 125 of the "Defence (Emergency) Regulations"

According to Kirshbaum, the Law has as effect that "no one is allowed in or out without permission from the Israeli Military." "This regulation has been used to exclude a land owner from his own land so that it could be judged as unoccupied, and then expropriated under the 'Land Acquisition (Validation of Acts and Compensation) Law (1953)'. Closures need not be published in the Official Gazette."

==== Absentees' Property Laws ====
The Absentees' Property Laws were several laws, first introduced as emergency ordinances issued by the Jewish leadership but which after the war were incorporated into the laws of Israel. As examples of the first type of laws are the "Emergency Regulations (Absentees' Property) Law, 5709-1948 (December)", which according to article 37 of the "Absentees Property Law, 5710-1950" was replaced by the latter; the "Emergency Regulations (Requisition of Property) Law, 5709-1949", and other related laws.

According to COHRE and BADIL (p. 41), unlike other laws that were designed to establish Israel's "legal" control over lands, this body of law focused on formulating a "legal" definition for the people (mostly Arabs) who had left or been forced to flee from these lands.

The absentee property played an enormous role in making Israel a viable state. In 1954, more than one third of Israel's Jewish population lived on absentee property and nearly a third of the new immigrants (250,000 people) settled in urban areas abandoned by Arabs. Of 370 new Jewish settlements established between 1948 and 1953, 350 were on absentee property.

The absentee property law is directly linked to the controversy of parallelism between the Jewish exodus from Arab and Muslim countries and the Palestinian exodus, as advocacy groups have suggested that there are strong ties between the two processes and some of them even claim that decoupling the two issues is unjust.

However, al-Husseini, Palestinian governor of East Jerusalem in the Palestinian National Authority (PNA), has said that the Israeli law "is racist and imperialistic, which aims at seizing thousands of acres and properties of lands".

==== Laws enacted ====
A number of Israeli laws were enacted that enabled the further acquisition of depopulated lands. Among these laws were:

- The "Land (Acquisition for Public Purposes) Ordinance (1943)". To authorise the confiscation of lands for Government and public purposes.
- The "Prescription Law, 5718-1958". According to COHRE and BADIL (p. 44), this law, in conjunction with the "Land (Settlement of Title) Ordinance (Amendment) Law, 5720-1960", the "Land (Settlement of Title) Ordinance (New Version), 5729-1969" and the "Land Law, 5729-1969", was designed to revise criteria related to the use and registration of Miri lands—one of the most prevalent types in Palestine—and to facilitate Israel's acquisition of such land.

== Israeli censorship of documents ==
Following the large-scale declassification of Israeli archival material in the 1980s, additional information about the circumstances surrounding the expulsion and flight of Palestinians became available, contributing to modern understandings of these events. At the same time, there has been evidence of Defense Ministry officials searching Israeli archives to remove previously declassified documents evidencing Israeli massacres of Palestinian villagers in 1947 and 1948 that led to the Palestinian expulsion and flight.

== Historiography ==
In the first decades after the exodus, two diametrically opposed schools of analysis could be distinguished.

Ian Black at The Guardian noted in 2010 that the events of the Nakba were by that point "widely described" as involving ethnic cleansing, with Israeli documents from 1948 themselves using the term "to cleanse" when referring to uprooting Arabs. Not all historians accept this characterization. Efraim Karsh is among the few historians who still consider that most of the Arabs who fled left of their own accord or were pressured to leave by their fellow Arabs, despite Israeli attempts to convince them to stay. He says that the expulsions in Lod and Ramle were driven by military necessity.

=== Palestinian narrative ===
The term "Nakba" was first applied to the events of 1948 by Constantin Zureiq, a professor of history at the American University of Beirut, in his 1948 book "Ma'na al-Nakba" (The Meaning of the Disaster) he wrote "the tragic aspect of the Nakba is related to the fact that it is not a regular misfortune or a temporal evil, but a Disaster in the very essence of the word, one of the most difficult that Arabs have ever known over their long history." The word was used again one year later by the Palestinian poet Burhan al-Deen al-Abushi.

In his encyclopedia published in the late 1950s, Aref al-Aref wrote: "How Can I call it but Nakba? When we the Arab people generally and the Palestinians particularly, faced such a disaster (Nakba) that we never faced like it along the centuries, our homeland was sealed, we [were] expelled from our country, and we lost many of our beloved sons." Muhammad Nimr al-Hawari also used the term Nakba in the title of his book "Sir al Nakba" (The Secret behind the Disaster) written in 1955. After the Six-Day War in 1967, Zureiq wrote another book, The New Meaning of the Disaster, but the term Nakba is reserved for the 1948 war.

Together with Naji al-Ali's "Handala" (the barefoot child always drawn from behind), and the symbolic key for the house in Palestine carried by so many Palestinian refugees, the "collective memory of that experience [the Nakba] has shaped the identity of the Palestinian refugees as a people".

The events of the 1948 Arab–Israeli War greatly influenced the Palestinian culture. Countless books, songs and poems have been written about the Nakba. The exodus is usually described in strongly emotional terms. For example, at the controversial 2001 World Conference Against Racism in Durban, prominent Palestinian scholar and activist Hanan Ashrawi referred to the Palestinians as "...a nation in captivity held hostage to an ongoing Nakba, as the most intricate and pervasive expression of persistent colonialism, apartheid, racism, and victimization" (original emphasis).

In the Palestinian calendar, the day after Israel declared independence (15 May) is observed as Nakba Day. It is traditionally observed as an important day of remembrance. In May 2009 the political party headed by Israeli foreign minister Avigdor Lieberman introduced a bill that would outlaw all Nakba commemorations, with a three-year prison sentence for such acts of remembrance. Following public criticism the bill draft was changed, the prison sentence dropped and instead the Minister of Finance would have the authority to reduce state funding for Israeli institutions that hold the commemorations. The new draft was approved by the Knesset in March 2011.

Ghada Karmi writes that the Israeli version of history is that the "Palestinians left voluntarily or under orders from their leaders and that Israelis had no responsibility, material or moral, for their plight." She also finds a form of denial among Israelis that Palestinians bear the blame for the Nakba by not accepting the UN's proposed partition of Palestine into separate ethnic states.

Perry Anderson writes that "the Nakba was so swift and catastrophic that no Palestinian political organization of any kind existed for over a decade after it."

=== Israeli narrative ===
The approach of the State of Israel and of Israeli-Jews to the causes of the exodus is divided into two main periods: 1949 – late 1970s and late 1970s – present (a period characterized by the advent of the New Historians).

Beginning in 1949, the dominant Israeli narrative was presented in the publications of various Israeli state institutions such as the national Information Center, the Ministry of Education (history and civic textbooks) and the army (IDF), as well as in Israeli-Jewish societal institutions: newspapers, memoirs of 1948 war veterans, and in the studies of the research community.

There were some exceptions: the independent weekly Haolam Hazeh, the Communist Party's daily/weekly Kol HaAm, and the socialist organisation Matzpen presented the Palestinian and the balanced/critical narratives. A number of Jewish scholars living outside of Israel – including Gabbay and Peretz – since the late 1950s have also presented a different narrative. According to this narrative, some Palestinians left willingly while others were expelled by the Jewish and later Israeli fighting forces.

==== Changes from the late 1970s ====
The dominance in Israel of the willing-flight Zionist narrative of the exodus began to be challenged by Israeli-Jewish societal institutions beginning mainly in the late 1970s. Many scholarly studies and daily newspaper essays, as well as some 1948 Jewish war veterans' memoirs have begun presenting the more balanced narrative (at times called the "post-Zionist" view). According to this narrative, some Palestinians left willingly (due to calls of Arab or their leadership to partially leave, fear, and societal collapse), while others were expelled by the Jewish/Israeli fighting forces.

From the late 1970s onwards, many newspaper articles and scholarly studies, as well as some 1948 war veterans' memoirs, began to present the balanced/critical narrative. This has become more common since the late 1980s, to the point that since then, the vast majority of newspaper articles and studies, and a third of the veterans' memoirs, have presented a more balanced narrative. Since the 1990s, also textbooks used in the educational system, some without approval of the Ministry of Education, began to present a balanced narrative.

The Israeli-Jewish societal change intensified in the late 1980s. The publication of balanced/critical newspaper essays increased, the vast majority, along with balanced 1948 war veterans' memoirs, by about a third. At the same time, Israeli NGOs began to present the balanced and the Palestinian narratives more significantly in their publications. Moreover, Israel opened up part of its archives in the 1980s for investigation by historians. This coincided with the emergence of various Israeli historians, called New Historians, who favored a more critical analysis of Israel's history. The Arab/Palestinian official and historiographical versions hardly changed, and received support from some of the New Historians. Pappé calls the exodus an ethnic cleansing and points at Zionist preparations in the preceding years and provides more details on the planning process by a group he calls the "Consultancy". Morris also says that ethnic cleansing took place during the Palestinian exodus, and that "there are circumstances in history that justify ethnic cleansing... when the choice is between ethnic cleansing and genocide—the annihilation of your people—I prefer ethnic cleansing."

Pappé's scholarship on the issue has been subject to severe criticism. Benny Morris says that Pappé's research is flecked with inaccuracies and characterized by distortions. Ephraim Karsh refers to Pappé's assertion of a master plan by Jews to expel Arabs, as contrived. On his part, Avi Shlaim—who has been described by The Economist as "the most classical" and "the most mainstream" of the New Historians—has been critical of Benny Morris, saying that, since the beginning of the Second Intifada, Morris's scholarship has "veered from the leftwing to the rightwing end" and that "racist undertones" against Arabs and Palestinians has become a characteristic of his work. Of Karsh, Shlaim has written that he gives "a selective and tendentious account designed to exonerate the Jewish side of any responsibility" for some of the events that took place in 1948 and that he engages in "distort[ion] and misrepresent[ation of] the work of his opponents".

In March 2015, Shai Piron, Yesh Atid party MK, and former education minister of Israel, called for Israel to have all schools include the Nakba in their curriculum. "I'm for teaching the Nakba to all students in Israel. I do not think that a student can go through the Israeli educational system, while 20% of students have an ethos, a story, and he does not know that story." He added that covering the topic in schools could address some of the racial tensions that exist in Israeli society. His comments broke a taboo in the traditional Israeli narrative, and conflict with efforts on the part of some Israeli lawmakers to defund schools that mark Nakba.

The 1948 Palestinian exodus has also drawn comparisons with the Jewish exodus from Arab and Muslim countries, which involved the departure, flight, migration, and expulsion of 800,000–1,000,000 Jews from Arab and Muslim countries between 1948 and the 1970s. In three resolutions between 2007 and 2012 (H.Res. 185, S.Res. 85, H.R. 6242), the US Congress called on the Barack Obama administration to "pair any explicit reference to Palestinian refugees with a similar reference to Jewish or other refugee populations".

Israeli historian Yehoshua Porath has rejected the comparison, arguing that the ideological and historical significance of the two population movements are totally different and that any similarity is superficial. Porath says that the immigration of Jews from Arab countries to Israel, expelled or not, was from a Jewish-Zionist perspective the fulfillment of "a national dream" and of Israeli national policy in the form of the One Million Plan. He notes the efforts of Israeli agents working in Arab countries, including those of the Jewish Agency in various Arab countries since the 1930s, to assist a Jewish "aliyah". Porath contrasts this with what he calls the "national calamity" and "unending personal tragedies" suffered by the Palestinians that resulted in "the collapse of the Palestinian community, the fragmentation of a people, and the loss of a country that had in the past been mostly Arabic-speaking and Islamic".

Israeli academic Yehouda Shenhav has written in an article entitled "Hitching A Ride on the Magic Carpet" published in the Israeli daily Haaretz regarding this issue. "Shlomo Hillel, a government minister and an active Zionist in Iraq, adamantly opposed the analogy: "I don't regard the departure of Jews from Arab lands as that of refugees. They came here because they wanted to, as Zionists." In a Knesset hearing, Ran Cohen stated emphatically: "I have this to say: I am not a refugee." He added: "I came at the behest of Zionism, due to the pull that this land exerts, and due to the idea of redemption. Nobody is going to define me as a refugee."

==== Criticism of the Israeli approach ====
An ongoing scholarly critique of the Israeli narratives about the events of 1948 is the overreliance of Israeli historians on Israeli official documents and archival sources. (Note: Israeli historians generally believe they are both ideologically and empirically impartial, and that the only reliable sources for the reconstruction of the 1948 war are in Israeli official documents and the archives of the Israel Defense Forces.) American historian Rosemarie Esber, an expert on Arab oral history, has argued that the often "excessive or even exclusive reliance on Israeli archives", even by the New Historians, with the exception of Ilan Pappé, has "limited their narratives and conclusions".

In response, Benny Morris has pointed out that the archives of the Arab states, including those of the main Arab political parties, royal courts, and armies, all remain closed and that historians are forced to rely primarily on Western and Israeli documentation.

== Films ==
- Al-Nakba: The Palestinian Catastrophe 1948 (1997), a documentary film by Benny Brunner and Alexandra Jansse that follows the events surrounding the creation of the Palestinian refugee problem.
- 500 Dunam on the Moon (2002), a documentary film directed by Rachel Leah Jones about Ayn Hawd, a Palestinian village that was captured and depopulated by Israeli forces in the 1948 war.
- The Sons of Eilaboun (2007), a documentary film by Hisham Zreiq that tells the story of the exodus and return of a small Palestinian village called Eilaboun in 1948.
- The Promise (2011), a British mini-series written and directed by Peter Kosminsky that deals with a young woman going to Israel in the present day and using her visit to investigate her soldier grandfather's part in the post-war phase of the British Mandate of Palestine.
- Farha (2022), a historical drama film directed by Darin J. Sallam about a Palestinian girl's experience during the Nakba, based on a true story she was told as a child about a girl named Radieh.

== Gallery ==
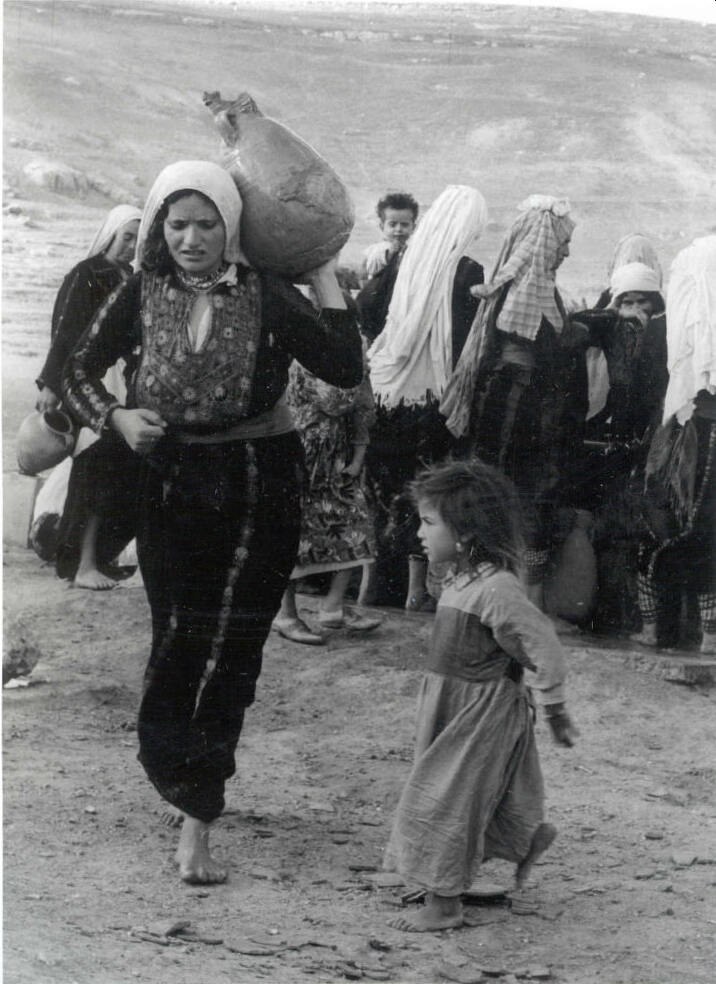
Palestinian woman, a child and a jug

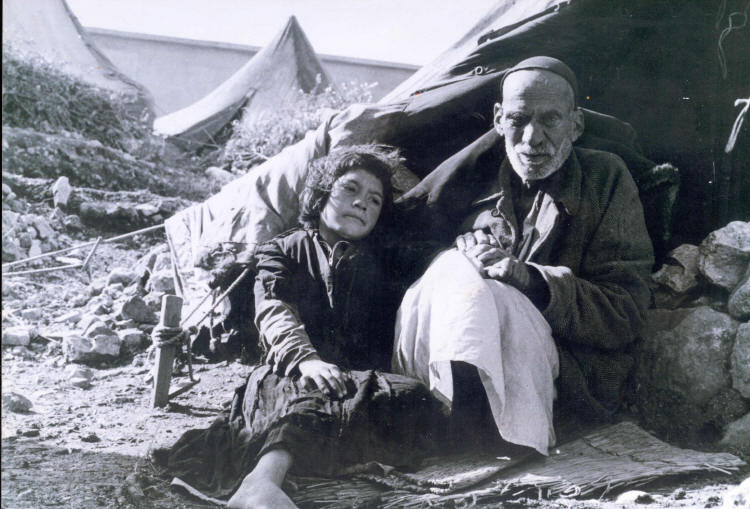
Refugees in the open, 1948

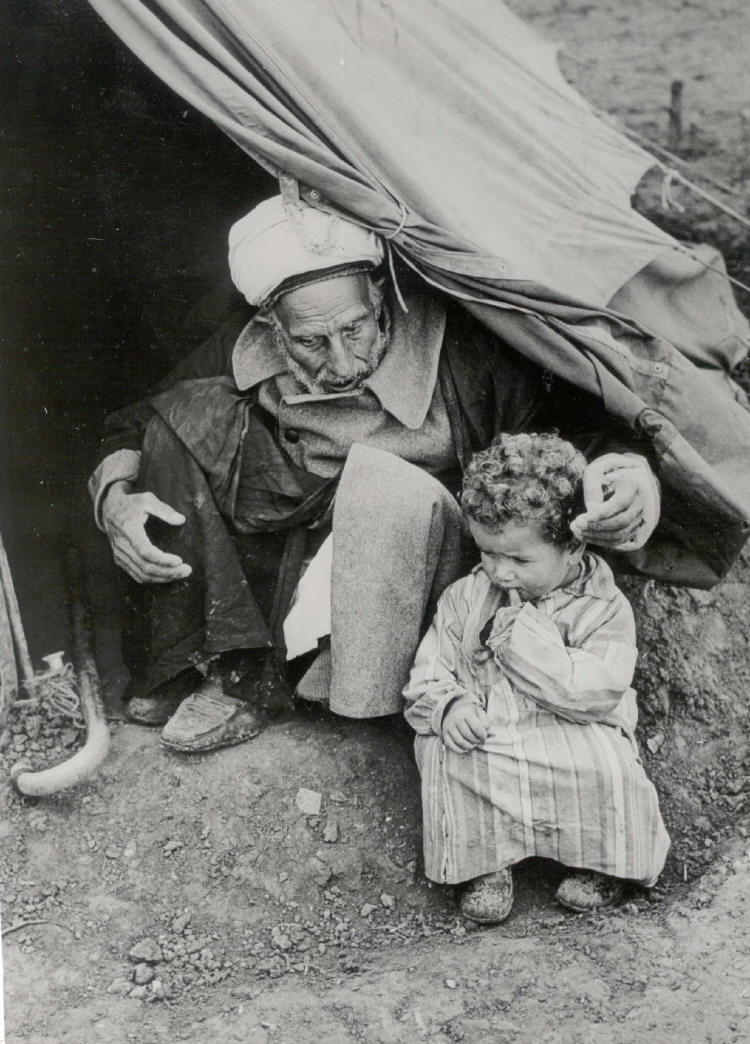
Old and young in the entrance of a tent, 1948

== See also ==
- Jewish exodus from Arab and Muslim countries
- 1949–1956 Palestinian exodus
- 1967 Palestinian exodus (Naksa)
- Arab diaspora
- Ethnic conflict
- Flight and expulsion of Germans (1944–1950)
- Palestinian diaspora
- Palestinian exodus from Kuwait (Gulf War)
