= Before You Is the Sea =

2011 film

- Directed by: Hisham Zreiq
- Written by: Hisham Zreiq
- Starring: Hisham Suliman; Hili Yalon
- Cinematography: Amir Rishpon
- Edited by: Hisham Zreiq
- Release date: 2011
- Running time: 9 minutes
- Countries: Germany; Israel; Palestine
- Languages: Hebrew; Arabic

Before You Is the Sea is a short film by the Palestinian visual artist and filmmaker Hisham Zreiq (Zrake). The film deals with the relationship between a young Palestinian man and a young Israeli Jewish woman The film is an allegory of the Middle East peace process, and the collapse of Oslo Accords during the Camp David summit, effectively ending years of peace hopes. The film was screened in many film festivals.

== Awards and festivals ==
Before you is the sea was a Finalist in MADE in MED short film contest and was screened in many film festivals and events as:

- Chicago Palestine Film Festival - Chicago, USA(2012)
- An adventure through films and visual arts by Hisham Zreiq - Rijswijk, Netherlands (2013)
- III MUESTRA DE CINE PALESTINO DE MADRID film festival - Madrid, Spain (2012)
- Tweede Palestijnse Filmdag Hilversum - Hilversum, Netherlands (2013)

== See also ==
- The Sons of Eilaboun
- List of Palestinian films
