= Don't Cry (film) =

- Directed by: Hisham Zreiq
- Written by: Hisham Zreiq
- Starring: Layla Asid; Perdita Christ; David Riedel
- Edited by: Hisham Zreiq
- Release date: 2022
- Running time: 9:20 minutes
- Countries: Germany; Palestine
- Language: German

Don’t Cry is a short, animated film by the Palestinian filmmaker Hisham Zreiq. The film is about a Palestinian girl, a Palestinian man and an Israeli woman who meet at a celestial lake, the meeting triggers a conflict between the man and the woman caused by a previous encounter, and the girl tries to mediate. In an interview with Zreiq in the Pan-Arabic culture online magazine of the London based The New Arab (Arabic: العربي الجديد) news agency said that the film uses symbolism, talking about the cycle of violence that always starts with an Israeli aggression, followed by a Palestinian reaction and results with more Palestinian deaths. Many symbols are to be seen in the film set, like a broken hourglass, a broken alarm clock and a slow-moving snail as a symbol for the death of peace and the time stand still after the collapse of Oslo accords. Other symbols like a bullet and a stone, unbalanced scale symbolizing the unbalanced conflict.

== Film festivals and awards ==
According to WAFA (Arabic: وفا) the National Palestine News Agency, Don't Cry was widely accepted by many festivals around the world, among that 11 festivals in Italy, and 10 in the USA In November 2022, in an Interview for “Dafah Thaletha” Zreiq stated that his film Don't Cry was selected to 70 film festivals in 18 countries around the world, the film won 32 awards in 24 festivals, and that shows a great acceptance of the story and the quality of the animation. Film critic Adrian Perez called the film "A Dreamlike Odyssey through Conflict and Reconciliation", and that the film "tackles the complexities of identity, belonging, and the potential for reconciliation". Perez also wrote "Zreiq's directorial vision is reminiscent of the mesmerizing blend of realism and surrealism found in films like Tarkovsky's "Stalker" (1979) and Panahi's "The Circle" (2000). The celestial lake, a symbol of both unity and division, recalls the magical realism of García Márquez's literature."

=== Partial award list ===
- Award of Recognition: Animation, Accolade Global Film Competition, La Jolla, United States
- Award of Recognition: Direction, Accolade Global Film Competition, La Jolla, USA
- Best short film, Dreamz Catcher International Film Festival, Kolkata, India
- Best short animation, Best Istanbul Film Festival, Istanbul, Turkey
- Best animated film, Stanley Film Awards, London, UK
- Best Animation, Andromeda Film Festival, Istanbul, Turkey
- Honorable Mention, Mannheim Arts and Film Festival, Mannheim, Germany
- Honorable Mention, Golden Lemur, Lisbon, Portugal

== See also ==
- Hisham Zreiq
- The Sons of Eilaboun
- List of Palestinian films
