= Hisham Sulliman =

Arab-Israeli actor

- هشام فضل سليمان
- Born: 1978 (age 47–48); Nazareth, Israel
- Occupation: Actor

Hisham Fadel Sulliman (Arabic: هشام فضل سليمان, Hebrew: הישאם סלימאן; born in 1978) is an Arab-Israeli actor. He is best known for his role in the Israeli drama film Bethlehem, and as Taufiq Hammed in the Israeli political thriller television series Fauda.

== Biography ==
Sulliman was born and raised in Nazareth, Israel, to a Palestinian Arab-Muslim family. As a child, he started acting at a community theatre. In 1997, he moved to Tel Aviv to study acting at the Yoram Loewenstein Performing Arts Studio, from which he graduated in 2000.

In 2007 he co-founded the Nazareth local Fringe theatre. Sulliman also took part in numerous plays in the Al-Midan and the El-Hakawati theaters.

Sulliman is probably best known for his role in the Israeli 2013 drama film Bethlehem, and his role in the Israeli political thriller television series Fauda as Taufiq Hammed, nicknamed "The Panther", a former official member of the Palestinian militant organization Hamas.

Sulliman is married to Rahik Haj Yahi, an Arab actress from Tayibe; they met in 2002 during a production of a play. They have three children, and live in Nof Hagalil, Israel.

In 2021, he started working on the TV series The Beauty Queen of Jerusalem.

Between 2024 and 2025, he has starred in two television drama projects based on the October 7 attacks. He starred in the anthology drama series, One Day in October, which first premiered in Israel on October 7, 2024 and will be released in the United States through HBO Max on October 7, 2025. He also stars in Red Alert, a limited series produced by American producer Lawrence Bender. It will be released internationally by Paramount+ and on Channel 12 in Israel on October 7, 2025.

== Filmography ==
=== Film ===
- Munich - 2005
- The Little Traitor - 2007
- Bethlehem - 2013
- Stay Alive - 2013
- Last Band in Lebanon - 2016
- Wounded Land - 2016

=== Television ===
- Fauda - 2015 (12 episodes)
- A Good Family
- Arab Labor
- Ha-Chaim Ze Lo Hacol
- Shemesh
- Homeland
- The Girl from Oslo (TV series)
- The Beauty Queen of Jerusalem
- One Day in October - (2024-2025)
- Red Alert - (2025)

=== Short films ===
- Just Another Day (2008, short film)
- Before you is the sea (2011, short film)
