= Unusuality Productions =

- Type: Independent
- Industry: Film
- Founded: 2005
- Headquarters: London, England
- Key people: Tariq Nasir, Director and Founder
- Products: Short Film, Documentary Feature, Film Festival
- Website: http://www.unusualityproductions.com

Unusuality Productions is an independent film production company, with offices in London, Jordan and the US. Founded in 2005 by Palestinian-American director Tariq Nasir, the company produces short films, feature-length documentaries. Unusuality Productions is also the parent company responsible for the Let's All Be Free Film Festival, which showcases films that explore the notion of what it means to be free, and had its inaugural year in 2013.

== Founder ==
The company was founded in 2005 by director Tariq Nasir, who left his career in the finance industry to follow his lifelong dream of becoming a filmmaker. Nasir wanted to create a production company that would give voice to stories that aren't often heard, and to bring people together through the sharing of personal experiences.

== Filmography ==
=== Belonging (2006) ===
Belonging was Tariq Nasir's directorial debut, and tells the story of how Nasir's family lost their home in Jerusalem during the Six-Day War with Israel. The film received its first public screening at the Second World Congress for Middle East Studies Film Festival in Amman. Poet and novelist Naomi Shihab Nye praised the film as "one of the most tender, thoughtful and informative films about the Palestinian story ever made", and it was screened in competition at several film festivals including the Chicago Palestine Film Festival.

=== Room Service (2011) ===
Room Service was Nasir's graduation film at the University of Westminster, and was shot entirely in a studio on a purpose-built set. The film focuses on Chris Campbell, who is waiting in a hotel room for an anonymous intimate experience with an escort, but is startled when it turns out he knows the woman who turns up at his hotel room door. Room Service was Unusuality Productions' first short film and went on to win the Gold Kahuna Award at the Honolulu Film Awards 2012, as well as being selected in the Official Competition at the Vegas Cine Fest 2012 and the New York City International Film Festival 2012. In August 2013, Room Service was released worldwide for streaming/download via the Play Festival Films app for iPhone and iPad.

=== The Code (2013) ===
The Code is a short and intense thriller, directed by Unusuality Productions' founder Tariq Nasir, that leads its main protagonist in way over his head as he becomes entangled with one woman and her race for survival. The film had its world premiere at the London Independent Film Festival 2013 and is part of the Official Selection at the Orlando Film Festival 2013.

== Other productions ==
The company has also produced two further short films, Consumed (2013) and Welcome (2013).

=== Palestine Lost ===
Palestine Lost is a feature-length docu-fiction that documents the impact of a twenty-four foot concrete barrier separating those with privilege and those less fortunate. Set in the divided West Bank and London, the documentary part of the film illuminates the daily struggle of Palestinians living under occupation, and of refugees longing to return home. In the fiction part of the film, VFX are used to transport the West Bank barrier to London, as we follow life for a fictional British family living under a similar occupation (from a non-specific military power). The film finished shooting in 2012 and is currently in post-production.

== Let's All Be Free Film Festival ==
Unusuality Productions is the parent company behind the Let's All Be Free Film Festival, which had its inaugural year in 2013, and screens films that explore the notion of what it means to be free. Held from 5 to 7 April 2013, at the Brunei Gallery in central London, the festival screened nearly 40 films to an audience of over 400 people. BAFTA nominated director Kim Longinotto was among the guests who attended and took part in Q&A discussions. The festival is returning in Spring 2014.
