= Just Another Day (film) =

Just another day
- Directed by: Hisham Zreiq
- Written by: Hisham Zreiq
- Starring: Hisham Suliman; Ziad Awaise
- Cinematography: Ossama Bawardi
- Edited by: Hisham Zreiq
- Release date: 2009
- Running time: 12 minutes
- Countries: Germany; Palestine
- Languages: Arabic, German

Just Another Day is a short film by the Palestinian visual artist and filmmaker Hisham Zreiq (Zrake). The film deals with post 9/11 status of Arabs in the Western world, via the story of a young Arab man that lives in Europe after the September 11 terror attacks. The story is told in a day when his city is struck by another terror attack, in a sad chapter of his life, because he is suffering after the woman he loves left him – precisely because he is an Arab.

The film is full of symbols, and a surrealistic atmosphere resembling Hisham Zreiq's art.

== Film festivals ==
- 18th Damascus International Film Festival, 2010, Syria (nominated)
- Salento International Filem Festival, 2010, Italy (nominated)
- Al Ard Doc Film Festival, 2011, Cagliari, Italy
- Palestine Film Festival in Madrid, 2010, Spain
- Chicago Palestine Film Festival, 2009, USA

== See also ==
- Hisham Zreiq
- The Sons of Eilaboun
- List of Palestinian films
