= DC Palestinian Film and Arts Festival =

Annual film festival held in Washington DC, United States

DC Palestinian Film and Arts Festival logo
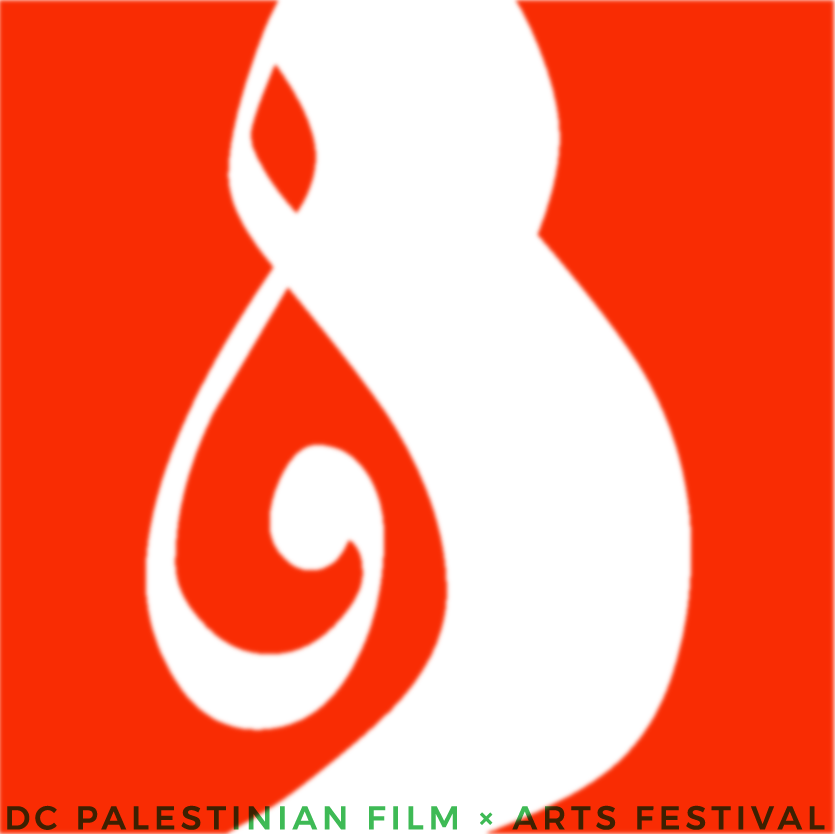
- Location: Washington, D.C.
- Website: http://dcpfaf.org

The DC Palestinian Film and Arts Festival (DCPFAF) is a non-profit, volunteer-run annual film festival established in 2011 that showcases the work of Palestinian filmmakers and artists in Palestine and in diaspora, showcasing the range and complexity of Palestinian identities and narratives.

== Background ==
In 2011, a group of three women founded the DCPFAF to create a platform for the artistic creativity of Palestinians, primarily through film but also through visual art, music, and other mediums. The DCPFAF launched in 2011.

== 2015 DCPFAF Program ==
- The Wanted 18, by Amer Shomali and Paul Cowan
- My Love Awaits Me by the Sea, by Mais Darwazah
- Giraffada, by Rani Massalha
- Hamule, by Mauricio Misle
- Roshmia, by Salim Abu Jabal
- Pioneer High, by Suha Araj
- Nun wa Zaytun, by Emtiaz Diab
- The Living of the Pigeons, by Baha' AbuShanab
- Villa Touma, by Suha Arraf
- Mars at Sunrise, by Jessica Habie
- The Book of Disappearance: Arabic Literary Program with Ibtisam Azem
- Layering Identities: From Architectural Heritage to Writing with Suad Amiry
- Musical performance by Rahim AlHaj and the Wanees Zarour Ensemble
- Photojournalism in Gaza with Eman Mohammed

== 2014 DCPFAF Program ==
- Condom Lead, Tarzan and Arab Nasser
- Gaza 36mm, by Khalil Al Mozayen
- A World Not Ours, by Mahdi Fleifel
- Cinema Palestine, by Tim Schwab and Majdi El-Omari
- Where Should the Birds Fly, by Fida Qishta
- Omar, by Hany Abu-Assad
- May in the Summer, by Cherien Dabis
- Horizon, by Zain Duraie
- Yalla to the Moon, by Jacqueline Reem Salloum and Suhell Nafar
- Leaving Oslo, by Yazan Khalili
- From Ramallah, by Assem Nasser
- Message to Obama, by Muhannad Salahat
- Journey of a Sofa, by Alaa Al Ali
- Apartment 10/14, by Tarzan and Arab Nasser
- Interference, by Amin Nayfeh
- Oslo Syndrome, by Ayman Azraq
- Twenty Handshakes for Peace, by Mahdi Fleifel
- Long War, by Asma Ghanem
- The Huda Asfour Quartet
- Lena Seikaly and Trio
- Stories for Justice, Visualizing Palestine exhibit

== 2013 DCPFAF Program ==
- When I Saw You, by Annemarie Jacir
- Where Should the Birds Fly? by Fida Qishta
- When Monaliza Smiled, by Fadi Haddad
- Infiltrators, by Khaled Jarrar
- Lyrics Revolt with Shannon Farhoud, Ahlene Ramadan, Melanie Fridgant, Rana Khaled Al Khatib

== 2012 DCPFAF Program ==
- The Last Friday
- Man Without a Cell Phone
- Nukayba
- Gaza: Tunnels to Nowhere
- Uncle Nashaat
- Palestinian Innovators: Love Under Apartheid with Tanya Keilani, Mousa Kraish, and Huda Asfour
- Yousef Erakat of FouseyTube

== 2011 DCPFAF Program ==
- This is My Picture When I Was Dead, by Mahmoud Al Massad
- Kingdom of Women, by Dahna Abourahme
- From Palestine With Love, by Mahasen Nasser-Eldin
- Samia, by Mahasen Nasser-Eldin
- The Time That Remains, by Elia Suleiman
- Diaries, by May Odeh
- Yousef Erakat of FouseyTube
- Mustafa Staiti of the Freedom Theatre

== See also ==
- Boston Palestine Film Festival
- Chicago Palestine Film Festival
- Cinema of Palestine
- List of Palestinian films
- List of film festivals
