= Hisham Zreiq =

Palestinian film director

- هشام زريق
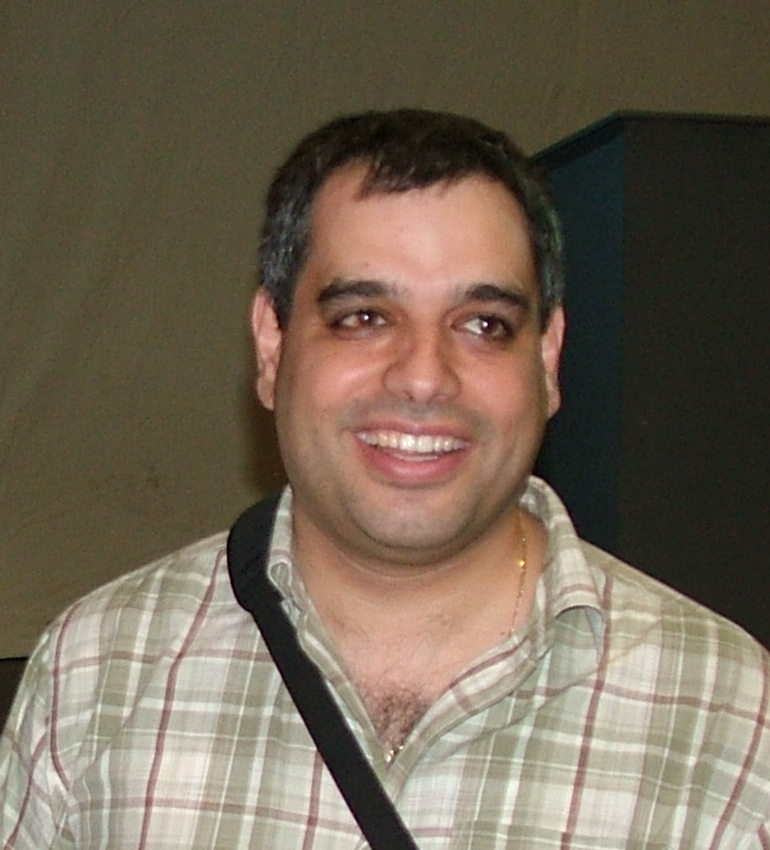
- Born: 9 February 1968 (age 58); Nazareth, Israel
- Other name: Hisham Zrake
- Occupations: Visual artist; film director; producer; animator; screenwriter; software architect; poet
- Years active: 1994–present
- Awards: Al-Awda Award for Best Documentary Film; 2008 The Sons of Eilaboun
- Website: hishamzreiq.com

Hisham Zreiq (Arabic: هشام زريق, Hebrew: הישאם זרייק; born 9 February 1968), also spelled Zrake, is a Palestinian-German filmmaker, poet, animator, musician and visual artist. He began working in computer art in 1994, and in 1996 started exhibiting his work in galleries and museums. In 2007 he filmed his first documentary, The Sons of Eilaboun, and in 2008 he created the short film Just Another Day, dealing with the life of Arabs living in western world after the September 11 attacks.

Zreiq uses his poetry and visual art in his films, as in Just Another Day, and was a member of the Culture Unplugged film festival panel. In 2018 Zreiq contributed to the book An Oral History of the Palestinian Nakba by writing a chapter based on the interviews from his documentary The Sons of Eilaboun. In 2022 he finished Don't Cry, an animated short film that won over 30 awards. In 2023 he started a music project called Goddess Asherah.

== Early life ==
Zreiq was born and raised in Nazareth, the son of Lydia Zreiq (née Dubayah), an elementary school teacher, and Salem Zreiq, a history high school teacher; both were Palestinian Eastern Orthodox Christians.

Zreiq studied computer science and mathematics, and works as a software architect. In March 2001 he moved to Germany, where he lives and works.

== Film career ==
In 2006 Hisham Zreiq started producing/directing films starting with the documentary 'The Sons of Eilaboun', that won Al-Awda Award in Palestine, followed by the short fiction film 'Just another day' (2009), a film that deals with the Arabs in the western world after September 11 attacks. In 2010/2011 he produced the short fiction 'Before you is the Sea', a film about the Middle East peace process in a form of a love story between a Jewish woman and a Palestinian man. In 2021 Zreiq finished a short animated film 'Don't Cry' that was selected for the Al Ard Film Festival the 18th-edition.

== Filmography ==
- The Sons of Eilaboun (2007, documentary film)
- Just Another Day (2008)
- Before you is the sea (2011, short film)
- Don't Cry (2022, short animated film)

== Awards and honors ==
In 2004 Hisham Zreiq was one of the winners of the award "Kunst- und Förderpreis Sparkasse Bayreuth", and his work was exhibited at Kunst & Museum Hollfeld. After the premiere screening of his first film "The Sons of Eilaboun" in Nazareth, Hisham Zreiq was honored by Ramiz Jaraisy, the mayor of Nazareth, and by Dr. Hana Sweid, an Israeli Arab politician and member of Knesset from Eilaboun. Ramiz Jaraisy described the film as an important work which tells the Palestinian story in a contrast with the dominant Israeli version. His film won the Al-Awda award in Palestine 2008, and in April 2012 Hisham Zreiq was chosen to be the artist of the month in the magazine This Week in Palestine. Some of Zreiq's works were featured in the ArtWanted.com book Creative Minds. His animated short film Don't Cry won over 30 awards.

=== Awards ===
- Kunst- und Förderpreis Sparkasse Bayreuth (2004), Hollfeld, Germany
- Best documentary, Al-Awda award (2008), Ramallah, Palestine
- Best short animation, Best Istanbul Film Festival (2022), Istanbul, Turkey
- Best Creative (Short film), International Halicarnassus Film Festival (2022), Bodrum, Turkey
- Best Animation, Sweet Democracy Film Awards (2022), Rome, Italy
- Best Animation, New York Neorealism Film Awards (2022), Rome, Italy
- Best Animated Film, Stanley Film Awards (2022), London, United Kingdom
- Award of Recognition: Animation, IndieFEST Film Awards (2022), La Jolla, CA, USA
- Award of Recognition: Direction, IndieFEST Film Awards (2022), La Jolla, CA, USA
- Award of Recognition: Animation, Accolade Global Film Competition (2022), La Jolla, CA, USA
- Award of Recognition: Film Short, Accolade Global Film Competition (2022), La Jolla, CA, USA
- Best Animated Short Film, Triloka International Filmfare Awards (2022), Wellington, Tamil Nadu, India
- Best Director, Triloka International Filmfare Awards (2022), Wellington, Tamil Nadu, India
- Best Animation Director, Mumbai Entertainment International Film Festival (2022), Mumbai, India
- Honorable Mention, Mannheim Arts and Film Festival (2022), Mannheim, Germany

=== Official selections ===
His films were screened in several festivals and events, such as:

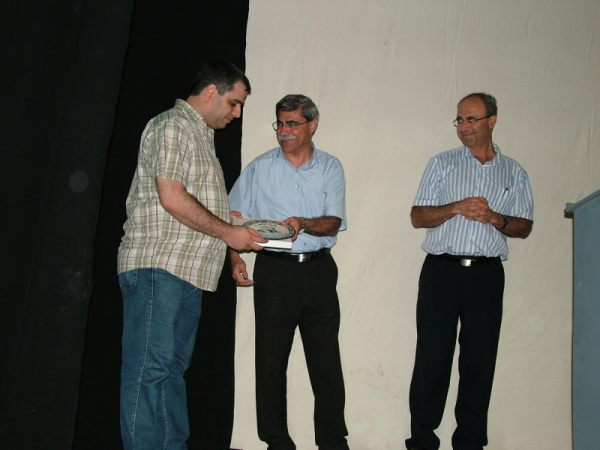
Hisham Zreiq Honored by Ramiz Jaraisy the mayor of Nazareth and Dr. Hana Sweid a Knesset member

- Sixth Annual International Al-Awda Convention 2008, California, United States
- Boston Palestine Film Festival 2008, United States
- International İzmir Short Film Festival 2008, İzmir, Turkey
- Amal The International Euro-Arab film Festival 2008, Spain
- Carthage Film Festival 2008 (Palestine: To remember section), Carthage, Tunisia
- Regards Palestiniens, Montreal Canada
- Chicago Palestine Film Festival, 2009
- 13th Annual Arab Film Festival, 2009
- Sixth Twin Cities Arab Film Festival, Minnesota, United States
- Salento International Filem Festival, 2010, Italy
- Palestine Film Festival in Madrid, 2010, Spain
- 18th Damascus International Film Festival, 2010, Syria
- Al Ard Doc Film Festival, 2011, Cagliari, Italy
- Toronto Palestine Film Festival, 2012, Toronto, Canada
- Al Ard Film Festival the 18th-edition, 2022, Cagliari, Italy
- Madrid Indie Film Festival • MADRIFF 2022, Madrid, Spain

== Non-film activities ==
Zreiq is a software architect and learned his trade in Israel at the Technion and Haifa University, and worked for almost 10 years in Israel in hi-tech companies. Zreiq Wrote a chapter for the history book An Oral History of the Palestinian Nakba based on the interviews from his documentary The Sons of Eilaboun.

== See also ==
- Palestinian Christians
