= Eilabun massacre =

War crime in the 1948 Arab-Israeli War

Coordinates: 32°50′18.24″N 35°24′02.74″E

- Part of 1948 Arab–Israeli War and Operation Hiram
- Location: Eilabun
- Date: 30 October 1948
- Target: Arab Christians
- Attack type: Massacre, mass execution
- Deaths: 14
- Perpetrator: Israel Defense Forces

The Eilabun (Note: Also spelled Eilaboun) massacre was committed on 30 October 1948 by the Israel Defense Forces as part of the 1948 Palestine war. A total of 14 men from the Arab Christian village of Eilabun were killed, 12 of them executed by the Israeli forces after the village had surrendered. The remaining villagers were expelled to Lebanon, living as refugees for some months before being allowed to return in 1949 as part of an agreement between the state of Israel and Archbishop Maximos V Hakim.

It was one of the few Arab villages to which most of the displaced were eventually able to return. The massacre is the subject of the documentary film The Sons of Eilaboun by Hisham Zreiq.

== Overview ==
Christian villages, which were usually friendly or not hostile to the Yishuv, were generally left in peace by Yishuv forces. The forces of Fawzi al-Qawuqji's Arab Liberation Army (ALA) occupied Eilabun. On the 12th of September 1948, two Israeli soldiers were killed on a nearby hilltop, Outpost 213. The severed heads of the Israeli soldiers were carried by the ALA troops and inhabitants of the village in a procession through the village.

After a battle outside the village in which six Israeli soldiers were injured and four Israeli armoured cars were destroyed, a battle that was part of Operation Hiram, the Golani Brigade's 12th Battalion, entered the village on 30 October 1948 and the population surrendered. Villagers flew white flags and were escorted by four local priests. Most of the villagers were hiding in two churches. The soldiers however were angry due to battle losses, the earlier procession, and possibly the discovery of a rotting head in one of the houses.

According to a letter by village elders, one villager was killed and another wounded by IDF fire while assembling at the IDF's orders in the village square. The IDF commander then selected 12 young men, ordered that the 800 assembled inhabitants be led to nearby Maghar, and then stayed behind to execute the 12 men. Another old man was killed by fire from an armoured car on the way. Some 42 young men were kept in a POW detention camp, and the inhabitants were expelled to Lebanon.

About fifty-two villagers were left in Eliabun, mainly the elderly and children. The village priests complained bitterly about the expulsion of the villagers and demanded their return. Following a United Nations investigation and pressure from the Vatican and discussion within the Israeli government, the villagers were allowed to return and receive Israeli citizenship as part of a 1949 agreement between the state of Israel and archbishop Maximos V Hakim in return for Hakim's future goodwill. In 1967, Hakim was elevated to Patriarch of the Melkite Catholic Church of the East.

The event was documented in a report by the United Nations observers. In 1983 the victims were commemorated by a memorial monument adjacent to the Christian cemetery in Eilabun. A second monument commemorating the massacre was built in 1998 but it was soon vandalized and practically effaced.

== See also ==
- Arab al-Mawasi massacre, directly connected
- Killings and massacres during the 1948 Palestine War
- List of massacres in Israel
