= Yuval Adler =

Israel filmmaker

- יובל אדלר
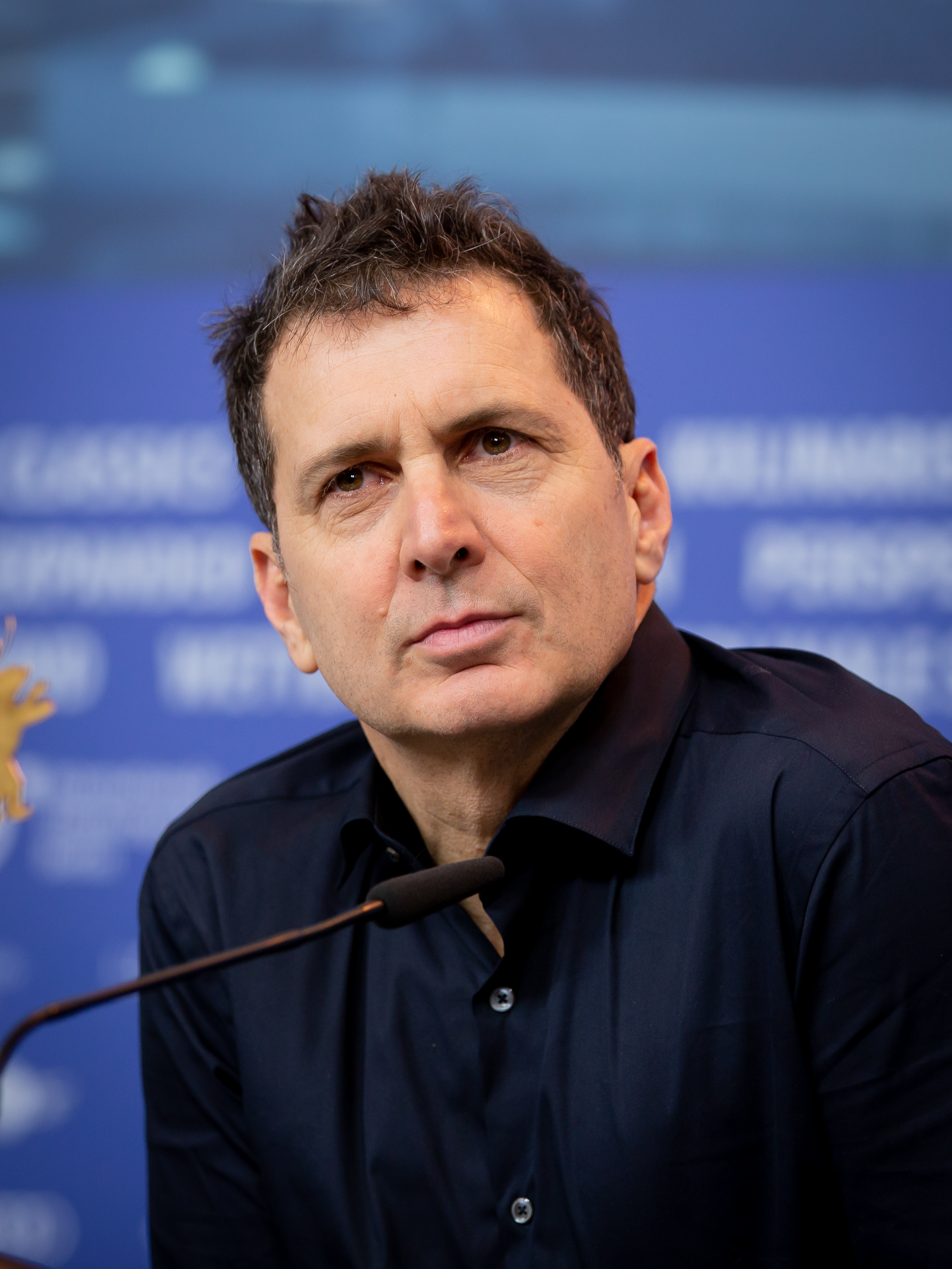
- Born: Herzliya, Israel
- Education: Tel Aviv University (Mathematics and Physics), Columbia University (PhD in Philosophy)
- Occupation: Filmmaker
- Notable work: Bethlehem
- Awards: Ophir Award for Best Director, Best Screenplay
- Website: yuvaladler.com

Yuval Adler (Hebrew: יובל אדלר; born Herzliya, Israel) is an Israeli-American filmmaker. Adler is perhaps best known for directing Bethlehem (2013), a film for which he won the Ophir Award for best director and best screenplay. Several scenes in Bethlehem were filmed in the West Bank. It was described in Haaretz as 'one of the most powerful Israeli films ever made.'

Adler studied mathematics and physics at Tel Aviv University and received a PhD in philosophy from Columbia University in New York City. He lives in New York City.

== Filmography ==
- Seduction (2006)
- Bethlehem (2013)
- Shooter (Season 2: "The Hunting Party", 2017)
- The Operative (2019)
- The Secrets We Keep (2020)
- Sympathy for the Devil (2023)
