= Bethlehem (2013 film) =

2013 film

- Film poster
- Directed by: Yuval Adler
- Written by: Ali Wakad; Yuval Adler
- Starring: Tzachi Halevy
- Cinematography: Yaron Scharf
- Release dates: 28 August 2013 (Venice); 26 September 2013 (Israel)
- Running time: 99 minutes
- Country: Israel
- Languages: Hebrew; Arabic
- Box office: $384,670

Bethlehem (Hebrew: בית לחם Bet Lehem) is a 2013 Israeli drama film directed by Yuval Adler. The screenplay was written by the director, Yuval Adler, and veteran journalist Ali Waked, following years of in-depth research.

The film was screened at the Venice Days section of the 2013 Venice Film Festival where it won the top prize. It was shown at the Telluride Film Festival and 2013 Toronto International Film Festival. The film was selected as the Israeli entry for the Best Foreign Language Film at the 86th Academy Awards after winning six Ophir Awards including Best Screenplay, Best Director and Best Film, but it was not nominated.

== Plot ==
At the heart of the film is the complex relationship between Razi (Tzachi Halevi), the Shin Bet officer in charge of the Bethlehem district, and Sanfur (Shadi Mar’i), the younger brother of Ibrahim, the commander of the Al-Aqsa Martyrs’ Brigades in the city. Razi recruited Sanfur as an informant when he was 15 and invested significant time in building their connection. Sanfur, who had always lived in his brother’s shadow, found in Razi a friend and a father figure—someone who believed in him and trusted him.

Now 17, Sanfur struggles to navigate between Razi’s demands and his loyalty to his brother and their associates. He leads a double life, lying to both sides. When the Shin Bet discovers the extent of Sanfur's involvement in his brother’s activities, Razi and Sanfur find themselves in an impossible situation.

== Cast ==
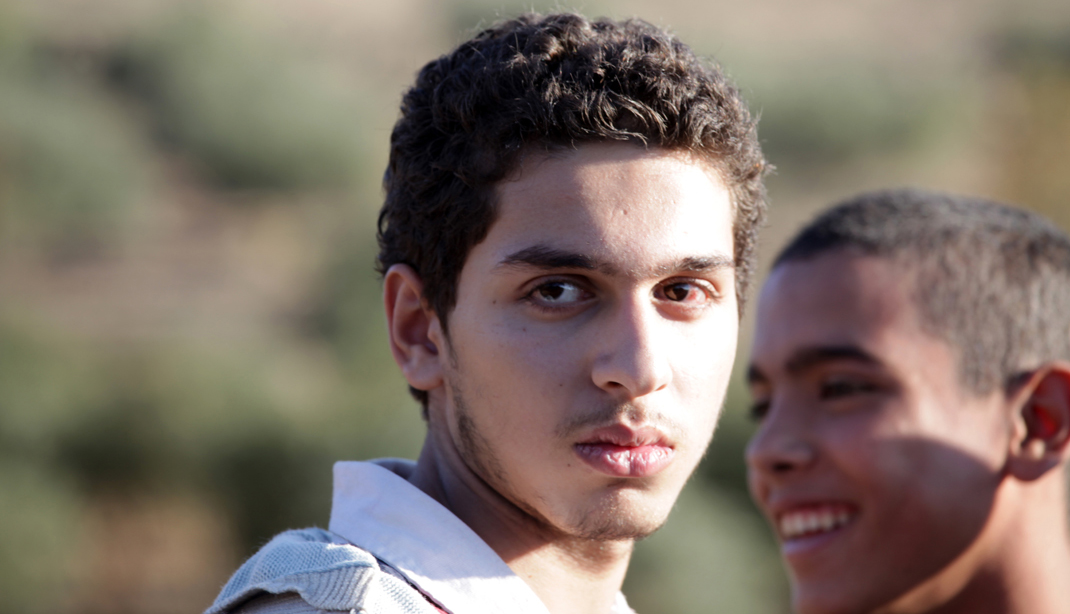
Shadi Mar'i in Bethlehem

- Tzachi Halevy as Razi
- Shadi Mar'i as Sanfur
- Hitham Omari as Badawi
- Michal Shtamler as Einat
- Tarik Kopty as Abu Ibrahim
- George Iskandar as Nasser
- Hisham Sulliman as Ibrahim

== Development ==
The screenplay was written by Yuval Adler and Ali Waked from 2007 to 2010. The script went through multiple drafts and was heavily influenced by research that the two conducted concomitantly to writing it, interviewing both Israeli Shin Bet operatives and Palestinian militants from Al-Aqsa Martyrs' Brigades and Hamas. At the time of writing the screenplay, Ali Waked was a correspondent for Ynet covering Palestinian affairs. Many incidents described in the film were directly influenced by actual events from the period. In 2010, the screenplay was included in the Berlinale co-production market which helped attach Belgian producers Entre Chien et Loup and German producers Gringo Films to the film. In January 2011, the Israeli Film Fund and the Jerusalem Film Funds gave their support to the project. English sales agent WestEnd picked up the film.

The casting process took almost a year. The three lead actors in the film, Shadi Mar’i who plays Sanfur, Tsahi Halevi who plays Razi and Hitham Omari who plays Badawi, were non-professionals who had never acted in a film before. Omari, a Palestinian from Kafr 'Aqab, was discovered accidentally during a location scout. Halevi was discovered just weeks before filming began; he was an aspiring singer who had just finished appearing on the first season of Israeli singing competition show The Voice Israel, where he had reached the final four. Mar'i, who was not even 17 at the time of the shoot, was discovered after hundreds of teenagers were auditioned. Many of the extras and bit players (both Israelis and Palestinians) were reenacting in the film scenes they experienced in their own lives.

== Filming ==
The film was shot digitally on Arri Alexa. Principal photography began November 2011 and lasted 29 days. The film was shot in Jerusalem, Bethlehem, Ramla and Jaffa with a few additional days of reshoots in early 2012. Post production work was done in Belgium and Germany.

== Reception ==
- The Hollywood Reporter, "Israeli debutant director Yuval Adler finds tragic personal drama among the murderous power players of his troubled homeland."
- The Telegraph, "There are few wise men in Yuval Adler's Israeli thriller, which screened as part of the Venice Film Festival, writes Robbie Collin."
- Variety, "This tightly wound clock-ticking thriller examines the Arab-Israeli conflict to impressive effect."
- The New York Times, "The murky world of terrorism and counter-terrorism, and the vicious circle of suspicion and betrayal in which all the players are locked, are well drawn in this gritty, suspenseful drama as the action moves toward its inevitably violent denouement."
- Haaretz, "yet another Israeli propaganda film", "an outrageous film", "the Israelis are the good guys, the Arabs the bad guys", "distortion and concealment", "abominable", "one-dimensional";
  "refuses to sort everyone into good and bad";
  "hits high notes but fails to transcend entertainment value."
- Al Monitor, "skillfully depicts relationships where empathy and exploitation, intimacy and instrumentalization are mixed together."
- Thedailybeast, "Brings the Occupation Back Into Our Homes."

== See also ==
- List of submissions to the 86th Academy Awards for Best Foreign Language Film
- List of Israeli submissions for the Academy Award for Best Foreign Language Film
