= Haneen =

Haneen is a feminine given name of Arabic origin. Notable people with the name include:

== Given name ==
- Haneen Ibrahim (born 2000), Sudanese swimmer
- Haneen Zoabi (born 1969), Palestinian-Israeli politician
- Haneen Zreika (born 1999), Australian rules footballer

== See also ==
- Hanin (disambiguation)
- Henein, surname
- Henin, surname
