= Henein =

Henein is a surname of Egyptian origin. Notable people with the surname include:

- Adam Henein (1929–2020), Egyptian sculptor
- Georges Henein (1914–1973), Egyptian author
- Marie Henein (born 1966), Canadian lawyer
- Maryam Henein, Canadian journalist
- Hani Henein, Canadian Materials Engineering Professor

== See also ==
- Henlein, surname
- Riskalla Henain (1903–?), Egyptian footballer
