= Hana Sweid =

Arab-Israeli politician

- حنا سويد
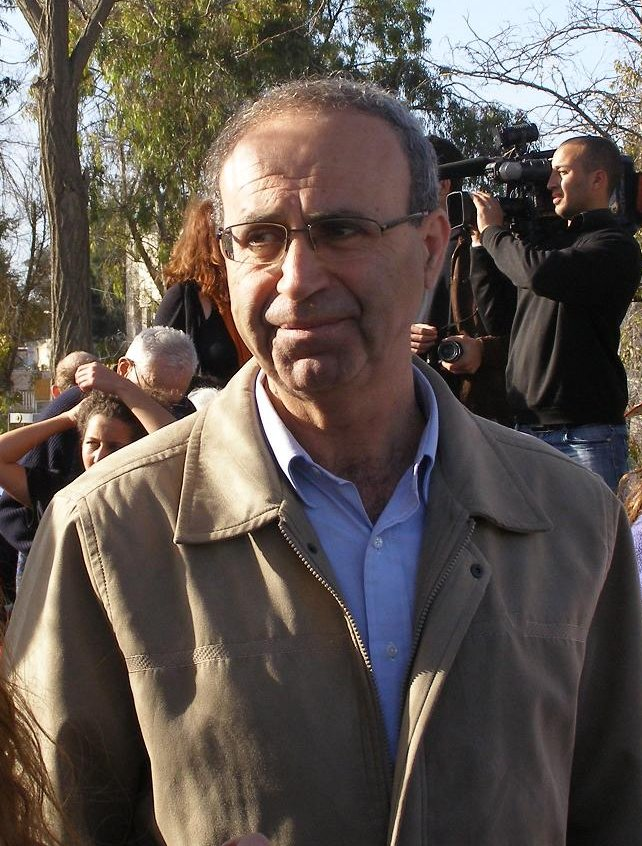

Faction represented in the Knesset
- 2006–2015: Hadash

Personal details
- Born: 27 March 1955 (age 71) Eilabun, Israel

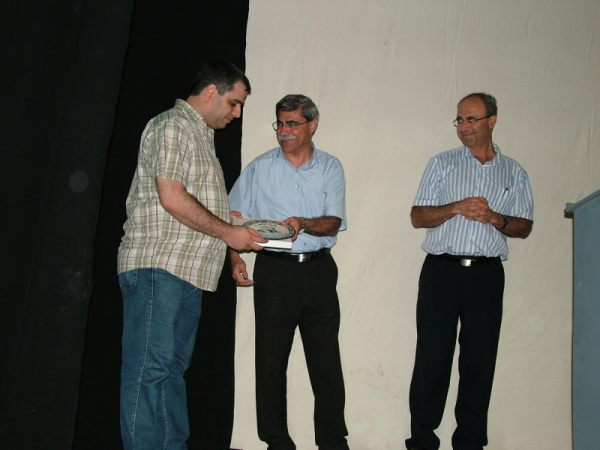
Hana Sweid with Hisham Zreiq (left).

Hana Swaid (Arabic: حنا سويد, Hebrew: חנא סוייד; also spelt Hanna Swaid, born 27 March 1955) is an Israeli Arab politician who served as a member of the Knesset for Hadash from 2006 to 2015.

== Early life ==
Born to a Christian Arab family in Eilabun, Sweid studied Civil Engineering at the Technion, gaining a BSc and an MSc. Further studies led to him receiving a PhD in Civil Engineering and Urban Planning. After his studies he worked as an engineer and also lectured at the University of Reading in the United Kingdom from 1990 until 1993. He became a member of the National Council for Planning and Construction in 1995, leaving it in 2003, the year in which he became Director General of the Arab Center for Alternative Planning, a position he held until 2006.

== Political career ==
Sweid began his foray into politics as head of Eilabun local council in 1993, a position he held until 2000. He was first elected to the Knesset in the 2006 elections. Since becoming an MK he has led efforts to establish a new Arab city in the north of Israel.

Placed second on the party's list, he retained his seat in the 2009 and 2013 elections. He retired from politics prior to the 2015 elections, although he was given a symbolic 109th place on the Joint List, an alliance of Hadash and other Arab parties.

== See also ==
- List of Arab members of the Knesset
