= This Week in Palestine =

Monthly magazine

- Type: Monthly newspaper
- Format: Online
- Owner: Sani Meo
- Founded: 1998
- Political alignment: Independent
- Language: English
- Website: http://thisweekinpalestine.com/

This Week in Palestine is a monthly English language magazine that covers cultural, social, and political issues in Palestine. Its website mission statement is "to promote and document Palestine."

== History ==
This Week in Palestine is published by Sani Meo and has been in regular print since December 1998.

== Notable editions ==
The February 2017 issue, titled "The State of Justice" and focusing on internal issues of justice in the State of Palestine, was sponsored by the United Nations Development Programme.

For their March 2018 issue in honor of International Women's Day they partnered with UN Women to publish four articles concerning the advancement of human rights for rural girls and women, implementation of the Sustainable Development Goals (SDGs) in Palestine and sought to improve gender equality by raising awareness to encourage greater participation from men. This campaign was called "Because I am a man".
