= Eilabun =

Arab town in Israel

Eilabun: עֵילַבּוּן; عيلبون
- Local council (from 1973)

Hebrew transcription(s)
  - ISO 259: Eilaboun
  - Also spelled: Illabun (official); Eilaboun, Ailabun (unofficial)
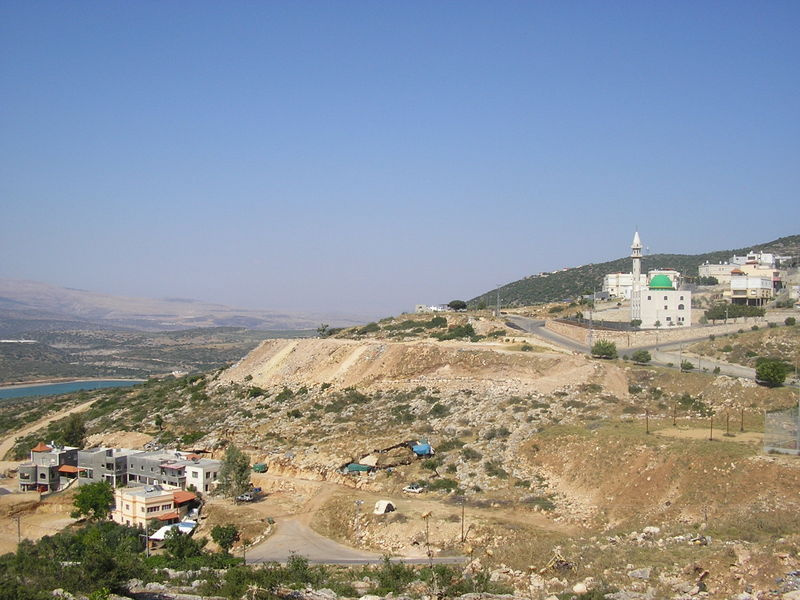

- Location within Northeast Israel Location within Israel
- Coordinates: 32°50′18″N 35°24′03″E
- Grid position: 187/249 PAL
- Country: Israel
- District: Northern
- Subdistrict: Kinneret
- Natural Region: Eastern Lower Galilee

Area
  - Total: 4,835 dunams (4.835 km^{2}; 1.867 sq mi)

Population (2024)
  - Total: 5,849
  - Density: 1,210/km^{2} (3,133/sq mi)

Ethnicity
  - Arabs: 99.5%
  - Jews and others: 0.5%

Eilabun (Arabic: عيلبون Ailabun, Hebrew: עַילַבּוּן, עֵילַבּוּ) is an Arab Christian village located in the Beit Netofa Valley around 15 kilometres (9 miles) south-west of Safed in northern Galilee between Nazareth and the Sea of Galilee, Israel. It had a population of 5,849 in 2024, which was 70,5% Christian and 29.5% Muslim. In 1973, Eilabun was granted local council status by the Israeli government.

== Etymology ==
According to the Survey of Western Palestine, the name Eilabun comes from Arabic, meaning "hard, rocky ground". According to some scholars, Eilabun was built on the ancient site of "Ailabu" (Hebrew: עַיְלַבּוּ), a possible variation of the name Ein Levon.

== History ==
=== Bronze Age to Mamluk period ===
Pottery remains from the Middle Bronze Age, Iron Age II, Persian, early Roman and from the Byzantine era have been excavated. Rock-cut sarcophagi have been found to the west of the village.

Eilabun is mentioned as one of the cities associated with one of the twenty-four priestly divisions, the residence of the priestly clan known as Haqoṣ. A stone inscription mentioning the town was discovered in Yemen by orientalist, Walter W. Muller, in 1970, and is believed to have been part of a synagogue, now turned into a mosque.

In 2013, excavations were conducted in Eilabun by Gilad Cinamon on behalf of the Israel Antiquities Authority (IAA), during which time remains from the Mamluk era were discovered.

=== Ottoman period ===
==== 16th century ====
In 1517, the village was incorporated into the Ottoman Empire with the rest of Palestine, and in 1596 it appeared in the Ottoman tax registers as being in the nahiya ("Subdistrict") of Tabariyya, part of Safad Sanjak, with a population of 13 Muslim households. The villagers paid a fixed tax rate of 25% on various agricultural products, including wheat, barley, summer crops, olive trees, cotton, goats and bee hives, in addition to occasional revenues and a tax for a press for olive oil or grape syrup; a total of 4,500 akçe.

==== 19th century ====
According to a local tradition cited by Emanuel Hareuveni, Arab Christians from the neighbouring Christian village of Deir Hanna settled in Eilabun during the 19th century.

In 1838, Aleibun was noted as a Christian village in the Esh Shagur district, which was located between Safad, Acca and Tiberias.

In 1875, the French explorer Victor Guérin found that the village had a population of about 100 Greek Christians, with a "humble" chapel. He noted an excellent water source, and remains (including columns) of old buildings.

In 1881, the PEF's Survey of Western Palestine (SWP) described it as "a stone village, well built, containing about 100 Christians. It is situated on a ridge, surrounded by brushwood, with arable land in the valley. A good spring exists to the west of the village."

A population list from about 1887 showed that Ailbun had about 210 inhabitants; all Catholic Christians.

=== British Mandate ===
In the 1922 census of Palestine, conducted by the British Mandate authorities, Ailabun had a total population of 319, all Christian, increasing in the 1931 census to 404, 32 Muslims and 372 Christians, in a total of 85 houses.

In the 1945 statistics, the population comprised 530 Christians and 20 Muslims, who owned a total of 11,190 dunams of land, while 3,522 dunams of land was public. Of this, 1,209 dunams were for plantations and irrigable land, 2,187 for cereals, while 18 dunams were built-up land.

=== Israel ===
==== 1948-49 war ====
Israel's Golani Brigade's 12th Battalion captured Eilabun on October 30, 1948, during the 1948 Arab-Israeli War, from the Arab Liberation Army (ALA). After the town's surrender, negotiated by four priests, the commander of the Golani troops selected 13–14 young Arab men of the 'Arab al-Mawasi Bedouin tribe and had them executed, in what became known as the Eilabun massacre, the point being to compel the rest of the tribe to leave. According to historian Benny Morris, those executed were Christians, and the executions were "apparently precipitated by the occupying troops' discovery of the decapitated bodies and one or both heads of two Israeli soldiers captured by ALA troops a month before." The village was then looted. Most of the town's residents were marched out to the Lebanese border, while hundreds fled to nearby gullies, caves and villages. As part of an agreement between Archbishop Hakim and the leader of the "Arab Section" in the Israeli Foreign Ministry, the Eliabun exiles in Lebanon were allowed to return in summer of 1949. Mordechai Maklef, then an operations officer on the Northern Front (and later IDF chief of staff), revealed that in some operations “the potential enemy” was eliminated, meaning civilians. He cited cases including Safsaf, Jish, Eilabun, Lod, Ramla, and larger-scale actions in the south, adding that the intention was expulsion and implying that mass displacement could not be carried out without such acts of terrrorism (טרור).

After the war, the village remained under Martial Law until 1966.

== Demographics ==
Historical population
Year	Pop.	±%
1972	1,600	—
1983	2,300	+43.8%
1995	3,300	+43.5%
2008	4,800	+45.5%
2022	5,777	+20.4%
2024	5,849	+1.2%

== 2000s Christian-Druze conflict ==
On 25 April 2008, six people were injured, two of them sustaining serious wounds, in a brawl which broke out between Druze and Christians near Eilabun. The sectarian conflict was a part of the long running feud between the communities, which began in 2004 in the city of Shefa-'Amr. The April 2008 clash began for an unknown reason as members of the Druze community marched towards the grave site of Jethro, Moses' father-in-law, walking on the main road near the village of Eilabun. The marchers fought with the village residents using guns and stones. The Druze community elders who were present at the scene managed to restore calm. The conflict ended following an official reconciliation between the Druze and Christians in 2009.

== Eilabun in film ==
The Sons of Eilaboun (Arabic: أبناء عيلبون) is a 2007 documentary film by Palestinian artist and film maker Hisham Zreiq, that tells the story of the Eilabun massacre, which was committed by the Israeli army during Operation Hiram in October 1948.

== Voting Patterns ==
In the 2022 election, 71 percent of voters in Eilabun voted for the Arab parties, while 23 percent voted for the parties of the center-left coalition led by Yair Lapid and 6 percent voted for the parties of the right-wing coalition led by Benjamin Netanyahu. Among the voters for the Arab parties, 56 percent voted for the Hadash–Ta'al list, while 26 percent voted for Balad and 18 percent voted for Ra'am.

In the 2026 election, 65 percent of voters in Eilabun voted for the Arab parties, while 32 percent voted for the parties of the center-left coalition led by Gadi Eisenkot and 2 percent voted for the parties of the right-wing coalition led by Benjamin Netanyahu. Among the voters for the Arab parties, 70 percent voted for the Joint List, while 30 percent voted for Ra'am. Voter turnout increased 29 percent from the 2022 election.

== Notable people ==
- Hana Sweid

== See also ==
- Arab localities in Israel
- Arab citizens of Israel
- Christianity in Israel

== Bibliography ==
- Barron, J.B., ed. (1923). Palestine: Report and General Abstracts of the Census of 1922. Government of Palestine.
- Benvenisti, M. (2000). Sacred Landscape: The Buried History of the Holy Land Since 1948. University of California Press. ISBN 0-520-21154-5.
- Cinamon, Gilad (2015-11-02). "'Elabbon Final Report" (127). Hadashot Arkheologiyot – Excavations and Surveys in Israel.
- Conder, C.R.; Kitchener, H.H. (1881). The Survey of Western Palestine: Memoirs of the Topography, Orography, Hydrography, and Archaeology. Vol. 1. London: Committee of the Palestine Exploration Fund.
- Degen, Rainer (1973). "An Inscription of the Twenty-Four Priestly Courses from the Yemen". Tarbiẕ (A Quarterly for Jewish Studies) (in Hebrew). 42 (3–4). Jerusalem: Mandel Institute for Jewish Studies: 302–303. JSTOR 23593539.
- Feig, Nurit (2011-03-06). "'Elabbon Final Report" (123). Hadashot Arkheologiyot – Excavations and Surveys in Israel.
- Government of Palestine, Department of Statistics (1945). Village Statistics, April, 1945.
- Gosker, Joppe (2013-03-04). "'Elabbon Final Report" (125). Hadashot Arkheologiyot – Excavations and Surveys in Israel.
- Guérin, V. (1880). Description Géographique Historique et Archéologique de la Palestine (in French). Vol. 3: Galilee, pt. 1. Paris: L'Imprimerie Nationale.
- Hadawi, S. (1970). Village Statistics of 1945: A Classification of Land and Area ownership in Palestine. Palestine Liberation Organization Research Center.
- HaReuveni, Immanuel (1999). Lexicon of the Land of Israel (in Hebrew). Miskal - Yedioth Ahronoth Books and Chemed Books. ISBN 965-448-413-7.
- Hütteroth, W.-D.; Abdulfattah, K. (1977). Historical Geography of Palestine, Transjordan and Southern Syria in the Late 16th Century. Erlanger Geographische Arbeiten, Sonderband 5. Erlangen, Germany: Vorstand der Fränkischen Geographischen Gesellschaft. ISBN 3-920405-41-2.
- Mills, E., ed. (1932). Census of Palestine 1931. Population of Villages, Towns and Administrative Areas. Jerusalem: Government of Palestine.
- Morris, B. (2004). The Birth of the Palestinian Refugee Problem Revisited. Cambridge University Press. ISBN 978-0-521-00967-6.
- Morris, B. (2008). 1948:A History of the First Arab-Israeli War. Yale University Press. ISBN 9780300126969.
- Palmer, E.H. (1881). The Survey of Western Palestine: Arabic and English Name Lists Collected During the Survey by Lieutenants Conder and Kitchener, R. E. Transliterated and Explained by E.H. Palmer. Committee of the Palestine Exploration Fund.
- Rhode, H. (1979). Administration and Population of the Sancak of Safed in the Sixteenth Century (PhD). Columbia University. Archived from the original on 2020-03-01.
- Robinson, E.; Smith, E. (1841). Biblical Researches in Palestine, Mount Sinai and Arabia Petraea: A Journal of Travels in the year 1838. Vol. 3. Boston: Crocker & Brewster.
- Schumacher, G. (1888). "Population list of the Liwa of Akka". Quarterly Statement - Palestine Exploration Fund. 20: 169–191.
- Urbach, E.E. (1973). "Mishmarot and Ma'amadot". Tarbiẕ (A Quarterly for Jewish Studies) (in Hebrew). 42 (3–4). Jerusalem: Mandel Institute for Jewish Studies: 304–327. JSTOR 23593540.
