= The Sons of Eilaboun =

- original movie dvd cover and poster
- Directed by: Hisham Zreiq
- Written by: Hisham Zreiq
- Produced by: Hisham Zreiq
- Cinematography: Amir Reshpon
- Edited by: Hisham Zreiq
- Music by: Duncan Patterson; Marcel Khalife
- Release date: September 28, 2007
- Running time: 24 minutes
- Countries: Germany; Palestinian territories Israel
- Languages: Arabic, English

The Sons of Eilaboun (Arabic: أبناء عيلبون) is a 2007 documentary film by Palestinian artist and film maker Hisham Zreiq (Zrake), that tells the story of the Eilabun massacre, which was committed by the Israeli army during Operation Hiram in October 1948. Eilaboun is a village in the Northern Galilee between Nazareth and the Sea of Galilee. In the incident, fourteen men were killed and twelve of them were executed. The villagers were expelled to Lebanon and became refugees for few months, before being allowed to return in 1949.

The film is the story of the film maker's family, and specially his father's story. Hisham Zreiq explained why he made the film when he said "He choked and his eyes were full of tears, and with a trembling voice he said 'I remember it as if it has just happened'—this is the way he ended the story, the story of a nine-year-old boy from a small village called Eilaboun, in Palestine 1948, the story of my father, when he was a refugee".

Ramiz Jaraisy, the mayor of Nazareth and Hana Sweid, an Israeli Arab politician and member of the Knesset from Eilaboun thanked Zreiq. Gilad Atzmon, an Israeli political activist, wrote that Zreiq delivers a deep and authentic reading of Palestinian history and portrays the intense emotional impact of the Nakba on those who survived.

== Synopsis ==
The film starts with Melia Zreiq, an old woman from Eilaboun, saying: "I hope God will bring peace to this land, and let the peoples live together—a good life. I hope there will be peace". Historian Ilan Pappé talks about Plan Dalet, a plan that David Ben-Gurion and the Haganah leaders in Palestine worked out during autumn 1947 to spring 1948. Pappe discusses the details of the plan, and how was it carried out. On October 30, 1948, the Israeli army entered Eilaboun at approximately 5 AM. They then forced the villagers together in the main square of the village. They chose seventeen young men. Five of them were taken as human shield, and the rest of the twelve were killed, each in a different location. This all happened after the expulsion of the rest of the village to Lebanon, where they became refugees after a five days forced march to Lebanon. After a United Nations peace keeper observed and reported Israel was forced to allow the people back.

== Awards and festivals ==
The film won the Al-Awda award in Palestine 2008, and was screened in several festivals and events, such as:

- Sixth Annual International Al-Awda Convention 2008, California, United States
- Boston Palestine Film Festival 2008, United States
- International İzmir Short Film Festival 2008, İzmir, Turkey
- Amal The International Euro-Arab film Festival 2008, Spain
- Carthage Film Festival 2008 (Palestine: To remember section), Carthage, Tunisia
- Regards Palestiniens, Montreal, Canada
- Chicago Palestine Film Festival, Chicago, United States
- 13th Annual Arab Film Festival, Los Angeles, United States
- Sixth Twin Cities Arab Film Festival, Minnesota, United States
- Palestine Film Festival in Madrid, 2010, Spain
- Al Ard Doc Film Festival, 2011, Cagliari, Italy
- Toronto Palestine Film Festival, 2012, Toronto, Canada

== See also ==
- List of Palestinian films
