= Boston Palestine Film Festival =

The Boston Palestine Film Festival (BPFF) is an annual film festival held in Boston, MA that was established in 2007. The festival brings Palestine-related cinema, narratives, and culture to New England audiences with the mission to "showcase the extraordinary narrative and culture of Palestinians through cinema and art." The thirteenth annual festival took place October 18–27, 2019.

== Overview ==
Run by volunteers and co-presented by the Museum of Fine Arts, Boston, BPFF features documentaries, features, rare early works, video art pieces, as well as new films by emerging artists and youth.

== Winners ==
Year	Best Feature Narrative	Best Feature Documentary	Best Short
2019	The Tower	Imprisoning a Generation	N/A
2018	The Reports on Sarah and Saleem	Soufra	N/A
2017	N/A	Stitching Palestine	Ayny - My Second Eye
2016	The Idol	Open Bethlehem	N/A
2015	Eyes of a Thief	The Wanted 18	N/A
2014	Giraffada	My Love Awaits Me by the Sea	N/A
2013	N/A	Voices Across the Divide, A World Not Ours (co-winners)	N/A
2012	N/A	The War Around Us	N/A
2011	Man Without a Cell Phone	N/A	N/A
2010	N/A	Jerusalem: The East Side Story	N/A

== See also ==
- Chicago Palestine Film Festival
- DC Palestinian Film and Arts Festival
