= List of Palestinian films =

This is an alphabetical list of films produced in the State of Palestine, the Palestinian Authority and by Palestinians - either under Israeli Civil Administration and Israeli-occupied West Bank and Gaza Strip.

== 0–9 ==
- 200 Meters (2020), dir: Ameen Nayfeh
- 3000 Nights (2015)
- 5 Broken Cameras (2011)

== A ==
- Ajami (2009)
- Amreeka (2009)
- Arna's Children (2003)

== B ==
- Budrus (2009)
- Bye Bye Tiberias (2023)

== C ==
- Chronicle of a Disappearance (1996)
- The Color of Olives (2006)

== D ==
- Divine Intervention (2002)
- Duma (2011)

== E ==
- Eyes of a Thief (2014)

== F ==
- Farha (2021)
- Fatenah (2009), 3D animated film about breast cancer taboo
- First Picture (2006)
- From Ground Zero (2024)

== G ==
- Gaza mon amour (2020)
- Ghost Hunting (2017)

== H ==
- Haifa (1996)
- Haneen (2013), short film
- Happy Holidays (2024)
- Huda's Salon (2021)

== I ==
- The Idol (2015)
- In Fair Palestine: a story of Romeo and Juliet (2008)
- The Iron Wall (2006)

== J ==
- Jenin, Jenin (2002)
- Jeremy Hardy vs. the Israeli Army (2003)
- Junction 48 (2016)

== L ==
- Lemon Tree (2009)
- Like Twenty Impossibles (2003)
- Love, Theft and Other Entanglements (2015), dir: Muayad Alayan

== M ==
- Mediterranean Fever (2022)
- Miral (2010)

== N ==
- No Other Land (2024), documentary

== O ==
- The Olive Harvest (2003)
- Omar (2013)

== P ==
- Palestine Stereo (2013)
- Paradise Now (2005)
- Pomegranates and Myrrh (2008)
- The Present (2021), short film
- Private (2004)

== R ==
- Rana's Wedding (2002)
- The Reports on Sarah and Saleem (2018), dir: Muayad Alayan

== S ==
- Salt of this Sea (2008)
- Slingshot Hip Hop (2008)
- The Sons of Eilaboun (2007)
- The Stranger (2021)

== T ==
- Tahaddi (2001)
- The Teacher (2023)
- Tears of Gaza (2009), documentary
- Thirteen in Gaza (2026)
- Three Promises (2023)
- The Time That Remains (2009)

== V ==
- Vibrations from Gaza (2023)

== W ==
- Wedding in Galilee (1987)
- When I Saw You (2012)

== Y ==
- Yasmine (1996)

== Z ==
- Zaytoun (2012)
