= Chicago Palestine Film Festival =

US annual film festival

The Chicago Palestine Film Festival is an annual film festival begun in 2001 in Chicago. It accepts Palestine-related works in a variety of genres — documentaries, dramas, comedies — in both long and short formats.

== See also ==
- The Sons of Eilaboun
- Boston Palestine Film Festival
- DC Palestinian Film and Arts Festival
