= British Palestinians =

Palestinians in the United Kingdom

Palestinians in the United Kingdom
Total population
- 20,000 (2001 estimate); 60,000 (2017 estimate)

Regions with significant populations
- (England) (Scotland)

Languages
- English (British English) • Arabic (Palestinian Arabic)

Related ethnic groups
- Arabs in the United Kingdom • Palestinian diaspora

Palestinians in the United Kingdom, commonly called British Palestinians, are people of Palestinian origin born or residing in the United Kingdom.

== History ==
According to Youssef Courbage and Hala Nofal in Palestinians Worldwide: A Demographic Study (2020), Palestinian presence in the United Kingdom predates the Nakba. Dina Matar writes in her 2005 thesis that the well-off and businesspeople arrived as early as the 1930s for education and work reasons.

Still composed mostly of students and professionals, larger waves of Palestinians began migrating to the UK from the 1960s and on, spurred by events such as the Naksa and the Lebanese Civil War (as many Palestinians had previously fled to Lebanon during the Nakba). Since the 1980s, especially after the Second Gulf War, an increasing number of stateless Palestinians have sought asylum in European countries to escape wars and political turmoil in the Middle East.

== Demographics ==
Outlined in Abbas Shiblak's The Palestinian Diaspora in Europe (2005), it was estimated there were 20,000 Palestinians in the UK in 2001, with the number rising after 1991. However, as pointed out by Lina Mahmoud in her essay for the same publication, Ghada Karmi in a 2008 article for This Week Palestine, and Dina Matar in her thesis, the number was impossible to calculate due to a lack of data on British-born Palestinians and Palestinian residents of Britain born in other countries. In 2020, Courbage and Nofal estimated the number was 60,000 in 2017.

From 2004 to 2006 and 2011 to 2012, Stéphanie Loddo (of the EHESS) collected ethnographic data from Palestinians living in Manchester, Oxford, and London and among Palestinian-related organisations. The respondents were both migrants (belonging to various categories – students, professionals, refugees – who arrived at certain intervals in different contexts) and British-born Palestinians. As a result of these migration patterns, the Palestinian community in the UK is diverse in terms of social class, civil and legal status, place of origin, and religious and cultural background.

Loddo, Courbage and Nofal, and Karmi agreed that Palestinians typically find relative success in the UK. Loddo considered the country a "favourable environment" for Palestinians as a "world leader" in higher education, arts, Arab media, and business.

== Notable people ==
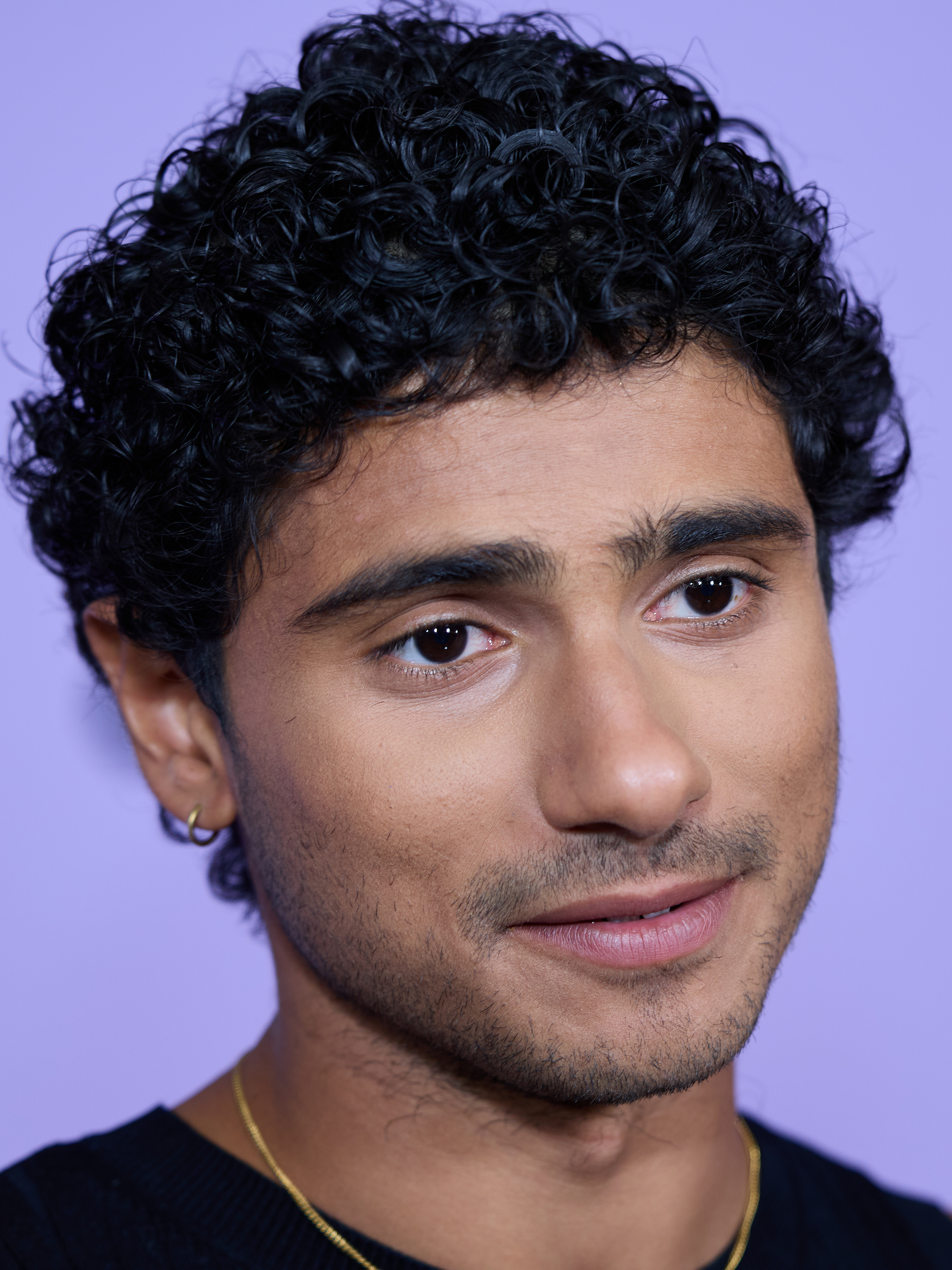
Actor Bilal Hasna

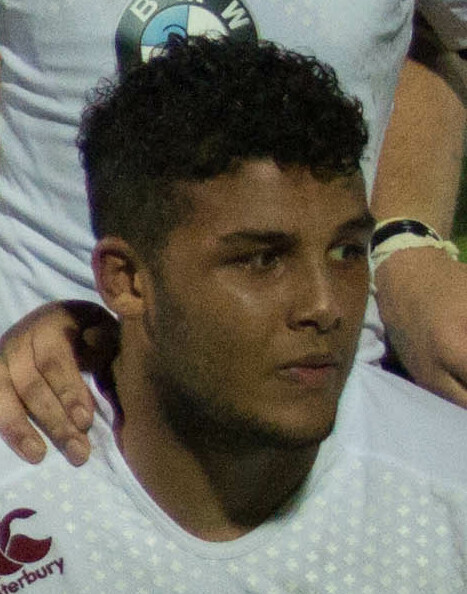
Rugby union player Lewis Ludlam

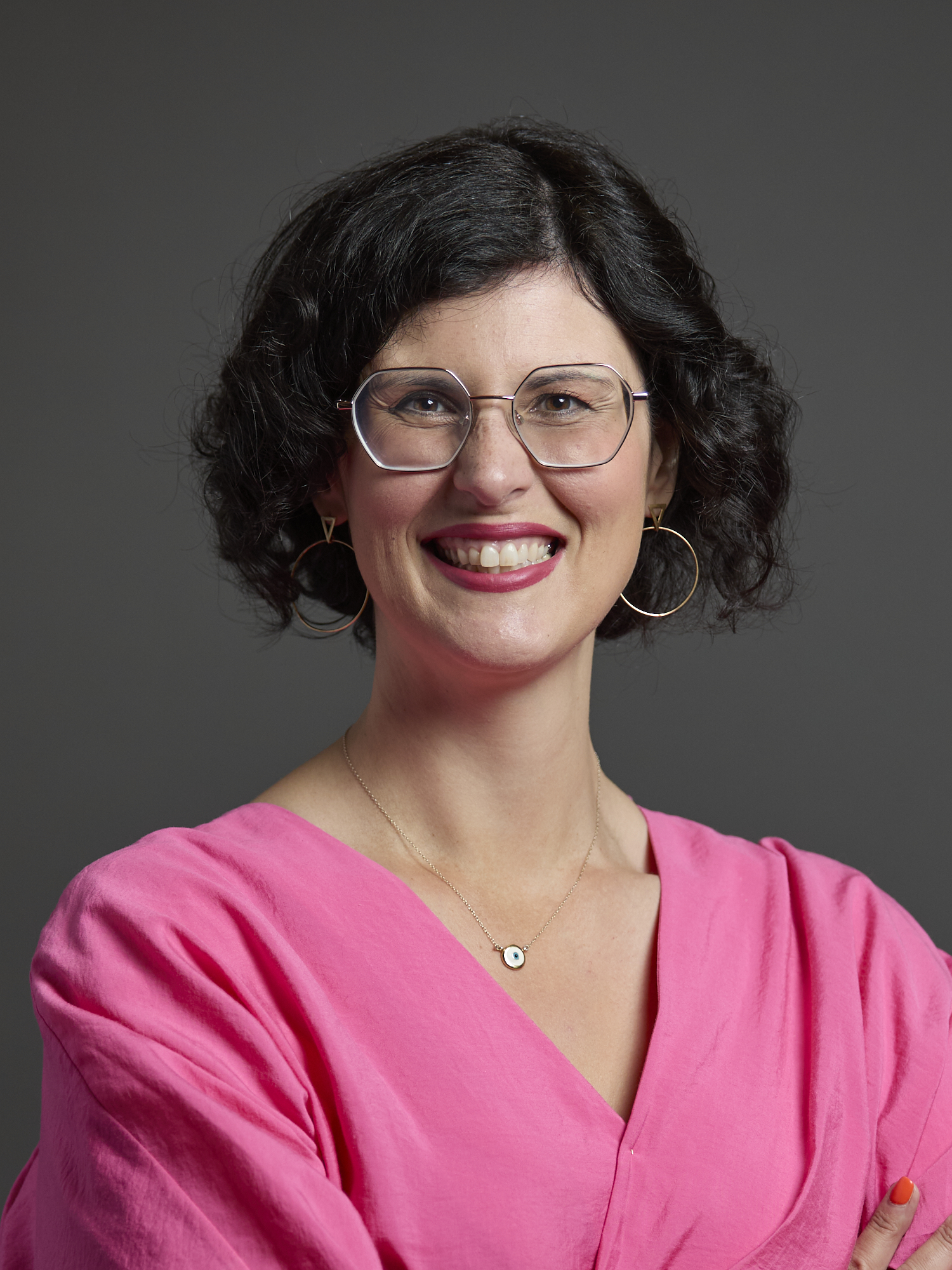
Liberal Democrat MP Layla Moran

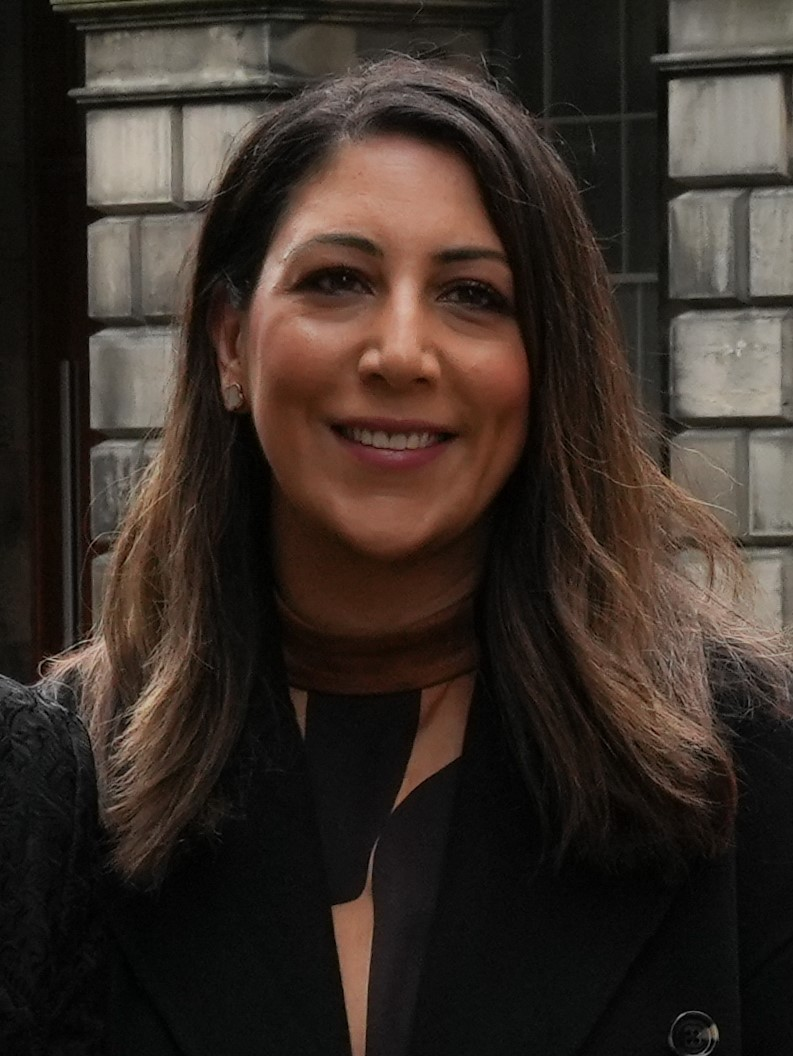
SNP politician Nadia El-Nakla

=== Born in the UK ===
- Nima Abu-Wardeh, journalist
- Sarah Agha, actress and presenter
- Huda Ammori, activist
- Faris Badwan, musician
- Selma Dabbagh, writer
- Isabella Hammad, novelist
- Bilal Hasna, actor and playwright
- Ben Jamal, activist
- Joudie Kalla, chef
- Reem Kelani, musician
- Lewis Ludlam, rugby union player
- Shadia Mansour, rapper
- Tanushka Marah, theatre director and writer
- Leanne Mohamad, public speaker and political activist
- Layla Moran, Liberal Democrats MP
- Farah Nabulsi, filmmaker
- Nadia El-Nakla, SNP politician
- Rosalind Nashashibi, artist
- Anbara Salam, writer

=== Born in Palestine ===
- Naji al-Ali, artist
- Naim Attallah, businessman and writer
- Zaher Birawi, activist and journalist
- Ghada Karmi, academic
- Ahmed Masoud, writer, theatre maker and academic
- Dina Matar, academic
- Basheer Nafi, historian
- N.S. Nuseibeh, writer
- Larissa Sansour, artist and filmmaker
- Laila Shawa, visual artist
- Yasir Suleiman, academic
- Abdul Latif Tibawi, academic
- Azzam Tamimi, academic
- Sami Tamimi, chef and author

=== Born abroad ===
- Ghassan Abu-Sittah, surgeon
- Sami Abu Wardeh, character comedian
- Tareq Baconi, writer
- Zaki Chehab, journalist
- Saleem Haddad, writer
- Mona Hatoum, artist
- Hanan Kattan, producer
- Victor Kattan, legal academic
- Bashar Lulua, orchestra conductor
- Michael Malarkey, actor and musician
- Karma Nabulsi, academic
- Leila Sansour, filmmaker
- Samir El-Youssef, writer

== Associations ==
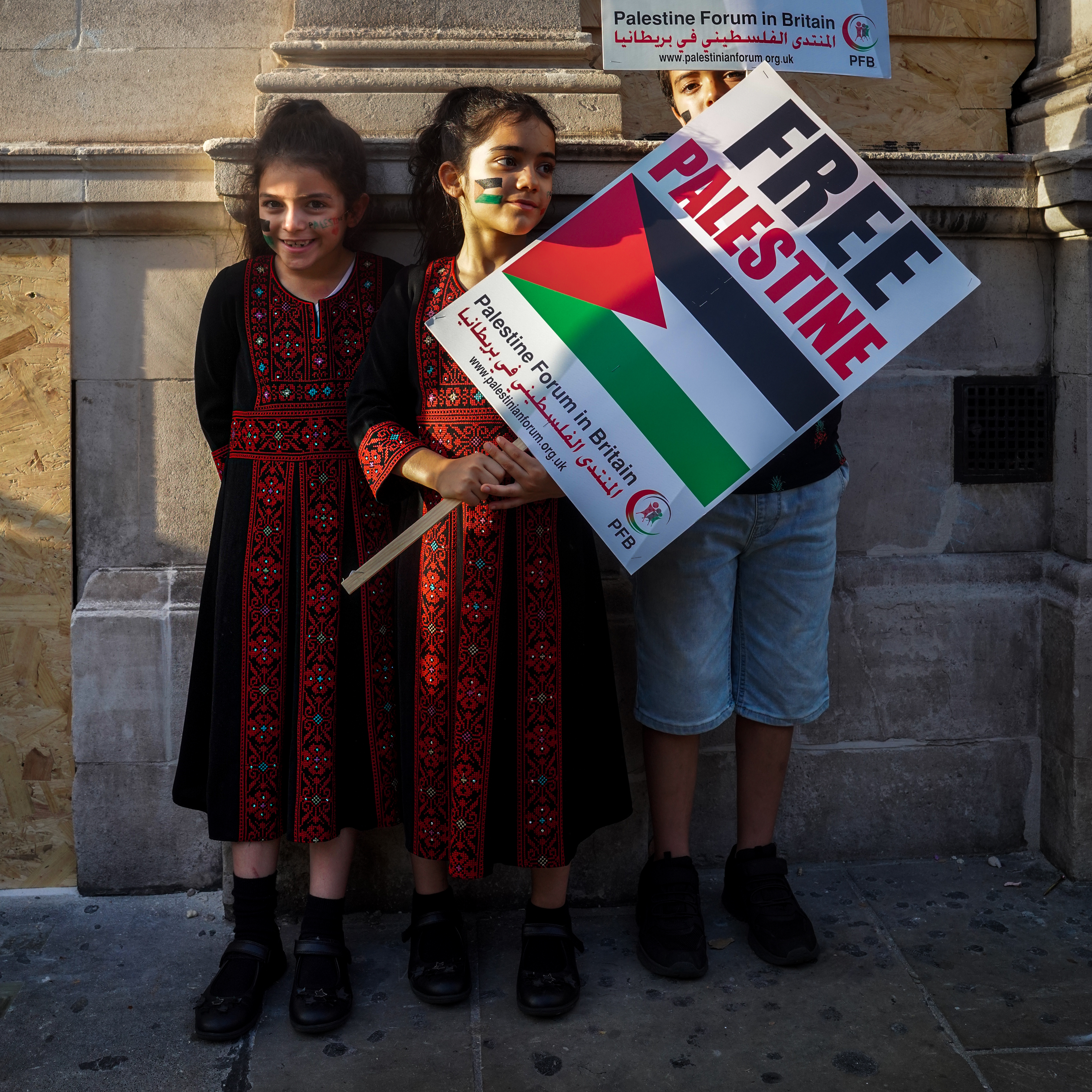
Children in traditional dress holding PFB placards

Organisations and collectives concerning British Palestinians specifically include the British Palestinian Committee (BPC), the Association of the Palestinian Community in the UK (APC–UK), the Palestine Community Foundation (PCF), and the Palestinian Forum in Britain (PFB). There is also the Scottish Palestinian Society (SPS).

The Mission of Palestine (embassy) in London began operating as a delegation in the 1970s.
