= Shoufani =

Shoufani (Arabic: شوفاني) is an Arabic surname. Notable people with the surname include:

- Elias Shoufani (1932–2013), Palestinian author and historian
- Emile Shoufani (1947–2024), Israeli Arab Christian theologist, educator, and peace activist
- Hind Shoufani (born 1978), Lebanese-Palestinian poet, director, and producer
