= Checkpoint 300 =

Israeli checkpoint between Jerusalem and Bethlehem

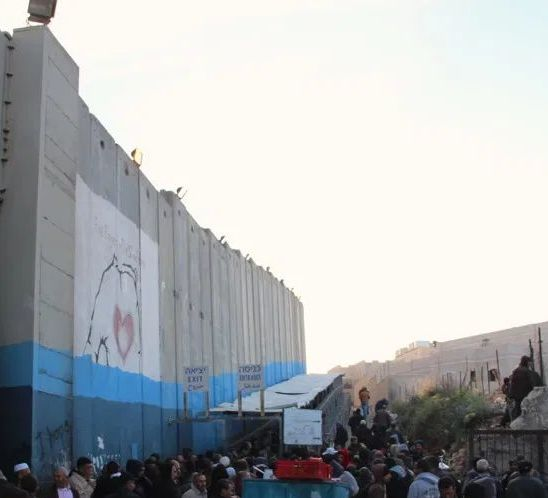
- The checkpoint in 2014

Location
- Location: Between Bethlehem and Jerusalem
- Coordinates: 31.726°N 35.204°E

Details
- Opened: 1990s
- Operated by: Israel Defence Forces

Checkpoint 300 (Arabic: حاجز 300, romanized: Ḥājiz 300; Hebrew: מחסום 300, romanized: Machsom 300), also known as the Bethlehem checkpoint, the Gilo Checkpoint, or the Rachel's Tomb checkpoint, is a major Israeli checkpoint run by the Israel Defense Forces (IDF) and located at one of the main exits of Bethlehem. It is the best known of all Israeli checkpoints, due to its use by large amounts of Palestinian commuters as well as its location on the tourist route between Jerusalem and Bethlehem.

As of September 2025, Checkpoint 300 remains open, one of three checkpoints that allows people with Palestinian Authority ID cards (and work permits) to cross into Israel. (Note: The other two are Qalandia checkpoint and the checkpoint at al-Zaytun (Ras Abu Sbitan).) However, entry requirements have been tightened in recent years; only children under the age of 12, women over the age of 50, and men over the age of 55 are allowed through. As of July 2025, it is also the only checkpoint permitted for use by employees of the United States government, due to inconsistent closures at other checkpoints.

== Location ==
The checkpoint is built into the West Bank barrier, and is about 2 kilometres (1.2 mi) south of the Green Line. The building is located entirely within the West Bank, Palestine. It is also located on Hebron Road, which, historically, ran between Jerusalem and Hebron; the road is currently blocked by the barrier wall. (Note: Rijke page 17)

Nearby landmarks on the Jerusalem side include Rachel's Tomb (also known as Bilal bin Rabah mosque). On the Bethlehem side is The Walled Off Hotel.

== History ==
People have crossed between Jerusalem and Bethlehem for as long as people have lived in the two areas. The checkpoint is more recent; it began in the 1990s as a temporary checkpoint, built with sandbags and cement blocks and manned by soldiers who checked Palestinian documents as they entered Jerusalem. The checkpoint in its current format as a "terminal checkpoint" was established in 2005.

The checkpoint building was renovated in 2010, 2014, and 2019. The 2019 renovation included new "welcome" signs and biometric "smart gates". Qalandia checkpoint received a similar upgrade around the same time.

Prior to the Gaza war, Palestinians with entry permits were allowed through Checkpoint 300, according to B'Tselem. In 2019, an estimated 15,000 people passed through the checkpoint "on busy mornings." The crossing was shut down temporarily after the October 7 attacks (2023), then reopened in December. According to Machsom Watch, traffic through the checkpoint was very low in late 2023 and early 2024. It was closed during the Twelve-Day War in June 2025, then reopened in July. In August 2025, Machsom Watch reported that "only a few hundred" people move into Jerusalem through the checkpoint per day, and many busses leave the nearby bus stop empty or with only a few passengers. Author Mark Griffiths reported in August 2025 that passing through the checkpoint took between 40 minutes and two hours.

== Operations ==
According to Machsom Watch, the checkpoint is manned at all times by a combination of Israeli Defense Forces soldiers and private security guards. Vehicles with Israeli plates may pass through at all hours, provided the people in the car have Israeli identification cards, Jerusalem identification cards, or foreign passports, and the inspector is not busy.

Conditions are generally different for Palestinian citizens. Palestinian vehicles may not enter at this checkpoint and must travel into Jerusalem on foot. The checkpoint is primarily available for day commuters, so the Bethlehem side closes at 12:30pm and the Jerusalem side closes at 5:00pm. A Palestinian worker who is late to pass through the checkpoint or forgets to scan their card is subject to punishment, including revocation of their work permit, sometimes for weeks or months at a time.

Turnstiles, fingerprint and iris scanners, metal detectors, and x-ray machines are used to control movement, verify identity, and inspect travelers for contraband.

== Reception ==
In March 2016, Israeli newspaper Yedioth Ahronoth criticized the overcrowding at the checkpoint and the attitude of the Israeli soldiers towards the Palestinians. In December 2020, the Association for Civil Rights in Israel filed a petition to the Israeli Supreme Court on the same topic. Humanitarian groups like Machsom Watch, as well as the Ecumenical Accompaniment Programme in Palestine and Israel, have also criticized the conditions of the Bethlehem checkpoint.

Before and after the upgrades, multiple sources said that at the checkpoint, Palestinians are treated like animals, or specifically like cattle, both before and after the 2019 upgrades. Some sources compare the architecture of the checkpoint to cages. One article reported that the 2019 upgrades resulted in Palestinians "no longer [feeling] like cattle" at the checkpoint, although the same article reported continuing ethical concerns and incidents where Israeli authorities ceased checkpoint operations without explanation.

People have reported misconduct by soldiers at the checkpoint, including incidents where soldiers or security guards yelled insults at civilians, improperly confiscated work permits, or were not properly trained for aspects of their job, such as the operation of the humanitarian gate.

Some people waiting in line have been injured during crushes caused by overcrowding, with some suffocating and fainting and others having their ribs broken. People have also been injured by getting stuck in the turnstiles, or by falling from the steel bars (after climbing there to avoid crowded conditions in the corridor below). All of this prompted public outcry, especially in the months before the 2019 upgrade, though the overcrowding issues persisted even after the upgrades were installed.

In 2020, Farah Nabulsi released a short film called The Present, which depicts a Palestinian man and his daughter attempting to pass through Checkpoint 300 to run an errand. According to Nabulsi, the film is intended to show viewers the "cruel, absurd reality" of restrictions on Palestinian freedom of movement imposed by Israeli checkpoints.

== See also ==
- Checkpoint 303
- Huwara checkpoint
