= P'tit Quinquin =

P'tit Quinquin may refer to:

  - P'tit Quinquin (film)
  - "P'tit Quinquin" (song)
