= Dina Matar =

Dina Matar FRSA
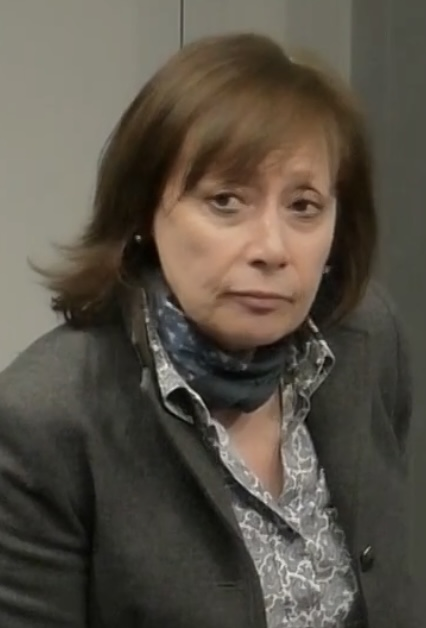
- Matar in 2020
- Born: March 1955 (age 71)
- Education: University of Jordan; London School of Economics
- Employer: SOAS University of London
- Spouse: John Taysom

Dina Matar (born March 1955) is a professor of political communication and Arab media, with a focus on Palestine, Lebanon, Jordan and Syria, and chair of SOAS University of London's Centre for Global Media and Communication. Prior to academia, Matar was a news correspondent, editor, and analyst.

== Education and personal life ==
Matar grew up in Dheisheh refugee camp. Her father Henry Matar (1916–1933) was a professor. Matar did her undergraduate Bachelor of Science (BSc) in Chemistry at the University of Jordan. In 1988, she moved to a suburb of London with her English husband John Taysom, whom she met in Bahrain, and their son. She went on to complete a Master of Science (MSc) in Comparative Politics in 1999 and a PhD in Media and Communication in 2005, both from the London School of Economics (LSE).

== Career ==
Matar began her career in journalism, working as a correspondent for outlets such as Reuters. Upon completing her PhD, she became a research fellow at her alma mater the LSE and a journalism lecturer at City, University of London. She joined SOAS University of London in 2005 as a Professor. In 2014, she was made Chair of the university's Centre for Global Media and Communications.

Alongside Lina Khatib, Tarik Soubry and John Esposito, Matar was a founding editor of the Middle East Journal of Culture and Communication. Matar published her first book and monograph What it Means to be Palestinian: Stories of Palestinian Peoplehood in 2010, in which she collected interviews with Palestinians across the Levant on their personal and family stories contextualised with broader history. She reunited with Khatib to co-author The Hizbullah Phenomenon (2014) with her and Alef Alshaer. She edited the volumes Narrating Conflict in the Middle East: Discourse, Image and Communications Practices in Lebanon and Palestine (2013) with Zahera Harb and Gaza as Metaphor (2016) with Helga Tawil-Souri.

From 2018 to 2024, Matar chaired the Centre for Palestine Studies. From 2020 to 2022, she headed School of Interdisciplinary Studies.

In October 2023, Matar was one of those over 800 scholars to warn of a potential genocide in Gaza. Matar reunited with Tawil-Souri to edit the collection Producing Palestine: The Creative Production of Palestine through Contemporary Media.

== Bibliography ==
=== Books ===
- What it Means to be Palestinian: Stories of Palestinian Peoplehood (2010)
- The Hizbullah Phenomenon: Politics and Communication (2014), with Lina Khatib and Atef Alshaer

=== Edited volumes ===
- Narrating Conflict in the Middle East: Discourse, Image and Communications Practices in Lebanon and Palestine (2013), edited with Zahera Harb
- Gaza as Metaphor (2016), edited with Helga Tawil-Souri
- Producing Palestine: The Creative Production of Palestine through Contemporary Media (2024), edited with Helga Tawil-Souri
- Reframing Political Communication in the Middle East and North Africa (2025)
- Archiving Gaza in the Present: The Power of Bearing Witness at a Time of War and Destruction (2025), co-edited with Venetia Porter
- Palestine as a Communicative Epistemology: Confronting the Mediation of Total Violence, edition of Communication, Culture & Critique (2025)
- Reframing Political Communication in the Middle East and North Africa (2025)

=== Chapters ===
- "News Stories and Disaporic Discourses of Identification: the Palestinians in Britain" in Diasporic ruptures: globality, migrancy and expressions of identity (2007)
- "Palestinians, News and the Diasporic Condition" and "What it Means to be Palestinian: News and the Diasporic Condition" in Arab Media and Political Renewal: Community, Legitimacy and Public Life (2007)
- "Performance, Language and Power: Nasrallah's Mediated Charisma" in Arabic and the Media: Linguistic Analyses and Applications (2009)
- "Rethinking the Arab State and Culture" in Arab Cultural Studies: Mapping the Field (2011)
- Foreword in Arab Cultural Studies: History, Politics and the Popular (2012)
- "Comparative Media Research in the Middle East" in The Handbook of Global Media Research (2012)
- "A Critical Reflection on Aesthetics and Politics in the Digital Age" in Uncommon Grounds: New Media and Critical Practice in the Middle East and North Africa (2014)
- "Narratives and the Syrian Uprising: The Role of Stories in Political Activism and Identity Struggles" in Bullets and Bulletins: Media and Politics in the Wake of the Arab uprisings (2016)
- "First Framing and News: Lessons from Reporting Jordan in Crises" in Reporting the Middle East: The Practices of News in the Twenty-First Century (2017)
- "Liminality; gendering and Syrian alternative media spaces" in Spaces of War, War of Spaces (2020), with Khouloud Helmi
- "Comparative Analysis of Israeli and PLO Diplomacy Practices during the May 2021 Israeli Attacks against Gaza" in Global Media Coverage of the Palestinian-Israeli Conflict: Reporting the Sheikh Jarrah Evictions (2023), with Sherouk Maher
- "Palestinian storytelling, witnessing and remembering as politics in the margin" in Reframing Political Communication and Media Practices in the Middle East and North Africa (2024)
- "Comparative analysis of the BBC and AJE coverage in the first week of Israel's 2023/24 war against Gaza: test case for media and conflict theories and news practices" in News Media and War in the Digital Age (2024), with Loreley Hahn-Herrera
- "Im(possibilities) of Palestinian 'media audiences' in times of permanent war and excessive mediation" in De-colonising audience studies (2024)

=== Articles ===
- "What It Means to Be Shiite in Lebanon: Al Manar and the Imagined Community of Resistance" in Westminster Papers in Communication and Culture (2006), with Farah Dakhlallah
- "Diverse Diasporas, One Meta-Narrative: Palestinians in the UK Talking about 11 September 2001" in Journal of Ethnic and Migration Studies (2006)
- "The Palestinians in Britain, News and the Politics of Recognition" in International Journal of Media and Cultural Politics (2007)
- "Heya Television: A feminist counterpublic for Arab women?" in Comparative Studies of South Asia, Africa and the Middle East (2007)
- "Editorial: Communicating Politics in Culture" in Middle East Journal of Culture and Communication (2008)
- "The Power of Conviction: Nasrallah's Rhetoric and Mediated Charisma in the context of the 2006 July War" in Middle East Journal of Culture and Communication (2008)
- "Contextualising the Media and the Uprisings: A return to History" in Middle East Journal of Culture and Communication (2012)
- "Hassan Nasrallah: The cultivation of image and language in the making of a charismatic leader" in Communication, Culture & Critique (2015)
- "Introduction: Toward a Sociology of Communication and Conflict: Iraq and Syria" in Middle East Journal of Culture and Communication (2017)
- "PLO Cultural Activism: Mediating Liberation aesthetics in revolutionary contexts" in Comparative Studies of South Asia Africa and the Middle East (2018)
- "The Syrian Regime's Strategic Communication: Practices and Ideology" in International Journal of Communication (2019)
- "The PLO's political communication arena; struggle over media legitimacy and domination" in British Journal of Middle Eastern Studies (2022)
- "What it means to be Palestinian: Reflections on anti-colonial identities in times of excessive production and destruction" in Middle East Journal of Culture and Communication (2024)
- "Habitual media: interrogating Western legacy media's complicity in the epistemic 'war' against Palestinians" in Third World Quarterly (2025)
