= Gilles Porte =

French film director (born 1965)

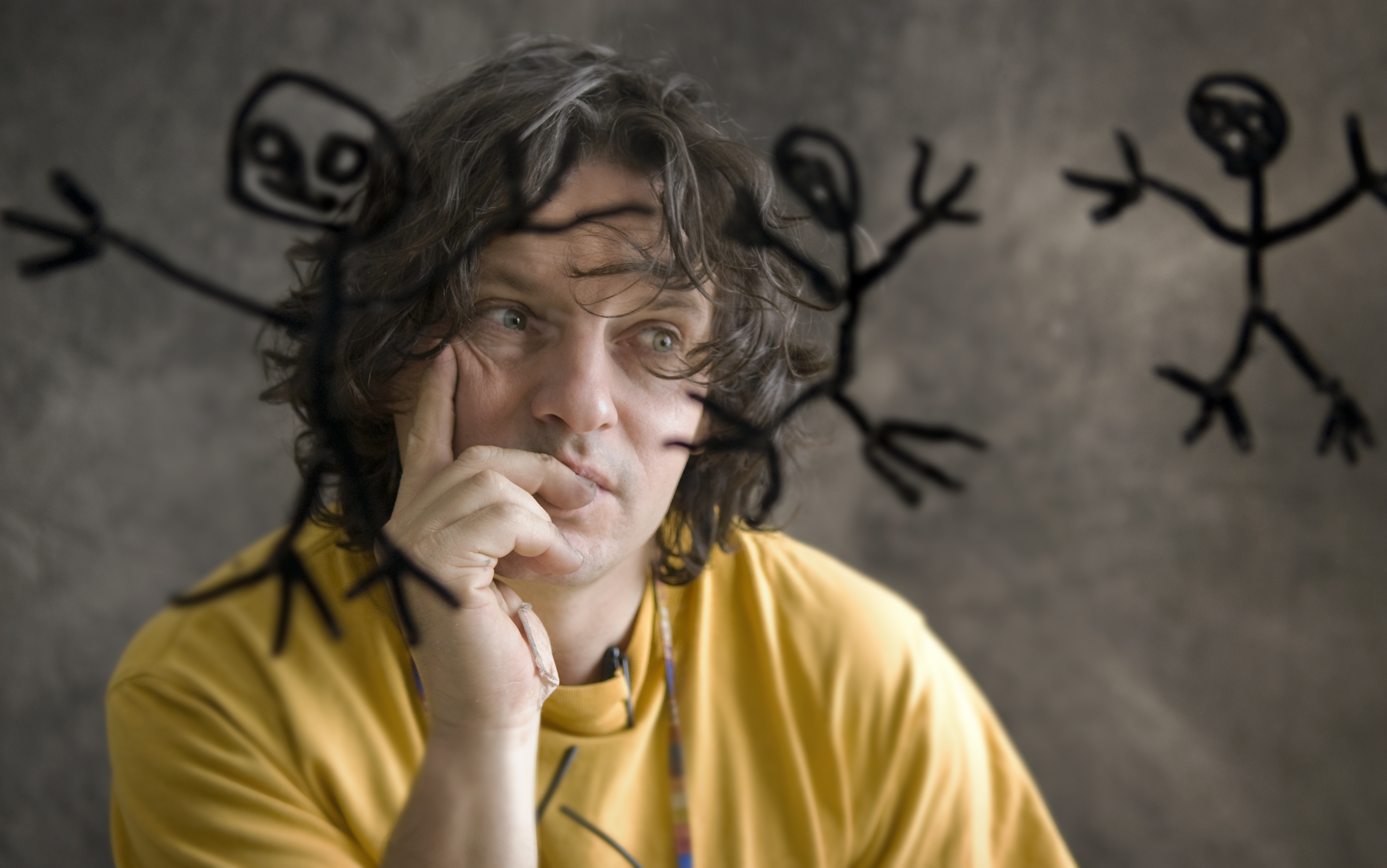
- Gilles Porte in 2009
- Born: 11 May 1965 (age 60); Lyon, France
- Occupation(s): Cinematographer, assistant cameraman, director, screenwriter,
- Years active: 1989–present

Gilles Porte (born 11 May 1965) is a director, screenwriter, cinematographer, and assistant cameraman.

He is a member of société des auteurs et compositeurs dramatiques (SACD), of société des auteurs, compositeurs et éditeurs de musique (SACEM) and of l'association française des cinémas d'art et d'essai (AFCAE).

== Life and career ==
Since 1989, Gilles Porte became an assistant cameraman on the films of Jacques Audiard, Marcel Carné, Raoul Ruiz, Maroun Baghdadi, Patrice Chéreau, Costa-Gavras, and Xavier Durringer, and cinematographer on films of Abbas Fahdel, John Lvoff, Christian Philibert, Xavier Durringer, Olivier Jahan, Pierre Javaux, Jilani Saadi, and others.

In 2003 he co-directed with Yolande Moreau his first feature film, Quand la mer monte ..., for which they received the 2005 César for best first film and for Best Actress.

== Filmography ==
Director, screenwriter

- 2005 : Quand la mer monte...

Director of photography

- 2023 The Teacher by Farah Nabulsi
- 2019 Who You Think I Am by Safy Nebbou
- 2018 Budapest by Xavier Gens
- 2016 In the Forests of Siberia by Safy Nebbou
- 2015 3000 Nights by Mai Masri
- 2014 L'ex de ma vie by Dorothée Sebbagh
- 2011 The Conquest by Xavier Durringer
- 2008 L'Aube du monde by Abbas Fahdel
- 2007 Ma vie n'est pas une comédie romantique by Marc Gibaja
- 2006 Les Enfants du pays by Pierre Javaux
- 2004 Quand la mer monte... with Yolande Moreau
- 2004 Khorma le crieur de nouvelles by Jilani Saadi
- 2003 Travail d'arabe by Christian Philibert
- 2001 Petits Riens by Xavier Durringer
- 2001 Faites comme si je n'étais pas là by Olivier Jahan
- 1999 Les Infortunes de la beauté by John Lvoff
- 1998 Play by Julien Favre
- 1995 Music for the movies : The Hollywood sound by Joshua Waletzky
