= Raoul de Godewaersvelde =

French singer

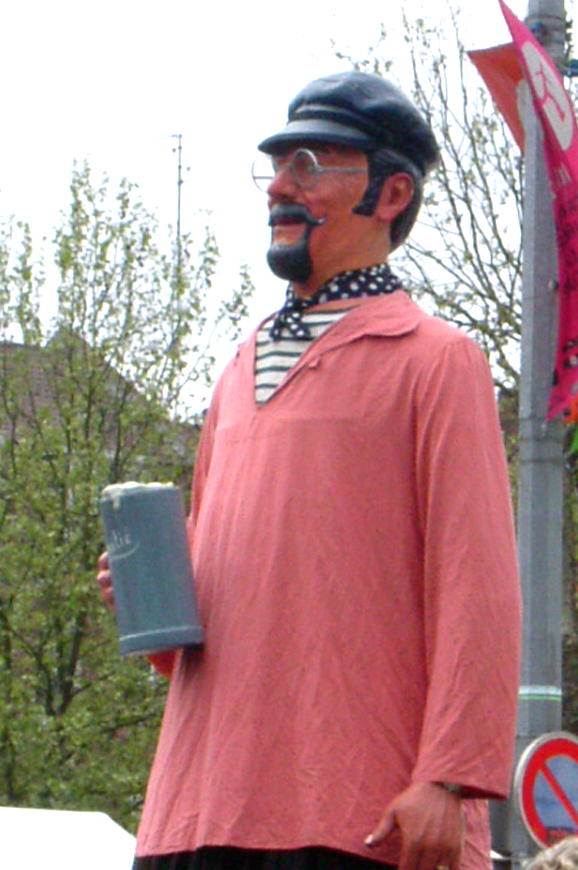
Raoul, one of the giants of Lille

Raoul de Godewaersvelde (born as Francis Albert Victor Delbarre; 28 January 1928 – 14 April 1977) was a French singer. Born in Lille, he was a member of the group Les Capenoules.

His best known song is undoubtedly "Quand la mer monte", written by his friend Jean-Claude Darnal. It was featured in Yolande Moreau's film of the same name. He is also famous for "P'tit quinquin".

In 1977, he committed suicide by hanging himself on a beam of a house under construction in front of the sea at Cap Gris Nez. He was 49 years old. He was buried in Audinghen, Pas-de-Calais. A DVD directed by David Lang entitled La chanson de Raoul was prepared tracing the legacy of the singer. Also artists from the region paid tribute to de Godewaersvelde in two compilation albums named Un Hommach à vous ottes (Picard for "a homage to you") interpreting many of his famous songs.

His son Arnaud Delbarre was a bass player with the band "Stocks" from 1984 to 1986 and during its reformation from 2001 to 2003. Arnaud Delbarre became the director of Paris Olympia after being in charge of the Zenith de Lille.

== Discography ==
- "Quand la mer monte"
- "P'tit quinquin"
