= The Present (2020 film) =

2020 Palestinian short film directed by Farah Nabulsi

- Directed by: Farah Nabulsi
- Written by: Farah Nabulsi; Hind Shoufani
- Produced by: Ossama Bawardi
- Starring: Saleh Bakri; Mariam Kanj; Mariam Basha
- Cinematography: Benoît Chamaillard
- Edited by: Hind Shoufani; Abdallah Sada
- Music by: Adam Benobaid
- Production company: Philistine Films
- Distributed by: Netflix
- Release dates: February 2, 2020 (Clermont-Ferrand International Short Film Festival); March 18, 2021 (Netflix)
- Running time: 24 minutes
- Country: Palestine
- Languages: Arabic; English

The Present (Arabic: الهدية, romanized: Al Hadiya, lit. 'The Gift') is a 2020 short film directed by Farah Nabulsi and co-written by Nabulsi and Hind Shoufani, about a father and daughter in the Palestinian enclaves of the Israeli-occupied West Bank trying to buy a wedding anniversary gift. The cast is led by Palestinian actor Saleh Bakri. It was released on Netflix on 18 March 2021, and won the BAFTA Award for Best Short Film in addition to being nominated for the Academy Award for Best Live Action Short Film.

== Summary ==
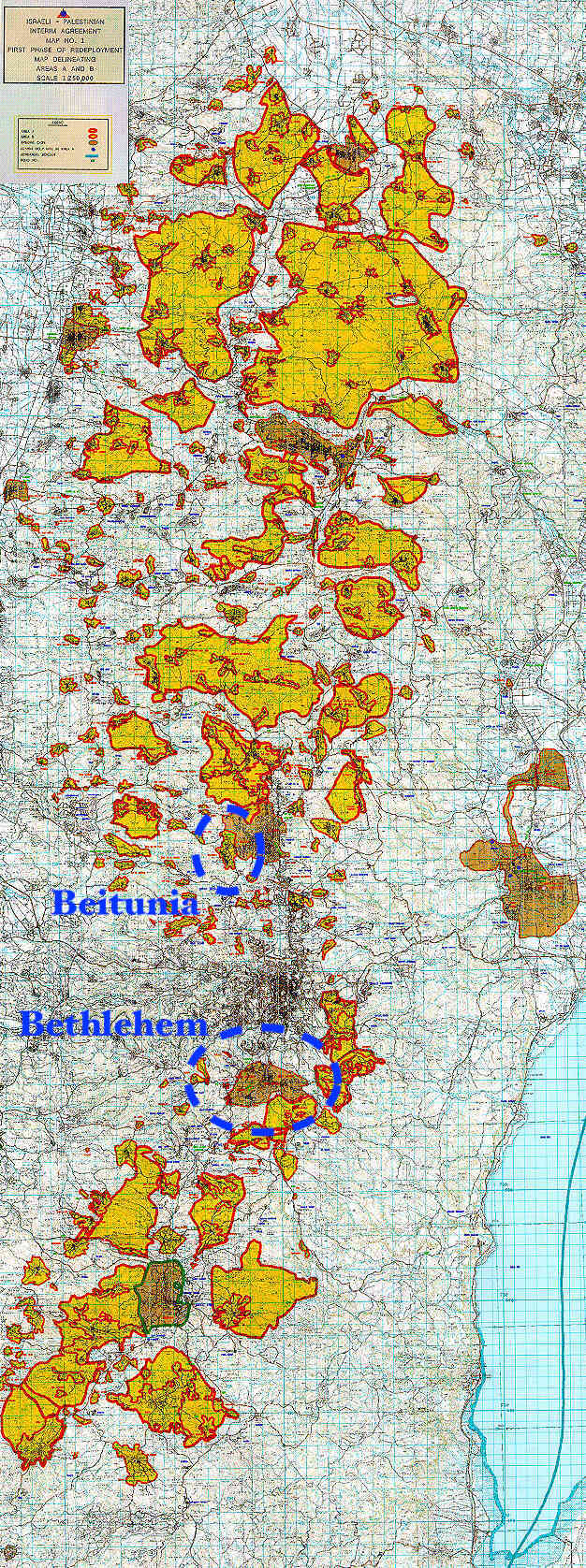
Beitunia and Bethlehem, the two locations shown in the film, on a map of the Palestinian enclaves under the Oslo II Accord. The two locations are about 20 kilometres (12 mi) apart.

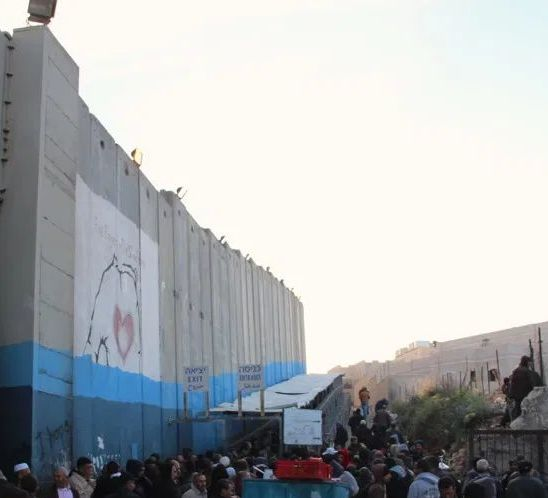
Checkpoint 300

Yusef, a Palestinian, is waiting to cross the overcrowded Checkpoint 300, near Bethlehem, in the early morning.

Later, at Yusef's home, he and his wife Noor discuss their wedding anniversary. Yusef says he is going on a shopping trip to Beitunia to buy a gift, with their daughter Yasmine.

Their progress in both directions is impeded by a variety of checkpoints. In a later scene, a group of young Israeli soldiers argue with each other over “what a seemingly more senior soldier views as the insufficiently uncompromising, perhaps insufficiently inhumane, behavior of his junior.”

== Cast ==
- Saleh Bakri as Yusef
- Mariam Kanj as Yasmine
- Mariam Basha as Noor

== Production ==
The opening scene of Yusef waiting to cross the border of the enclave was produced on location with guerrilla filmmaking; Nabulsi described it as "probably the most rewarding scene” in the film to make":

The only fiction in that scene is our protagonist, Yusef... All the other hundreds of Palestinians you see there are actual Palestinians going to work at the crack of dawn... I have a whole philosophical conversation we could have about who should we be asking permissions from to film such a monstrosity … I just decided we were going to take that risk.

== Accolades ==
The film premiered at the Clermont-Ferrand International Short Film Festival, where it won the Audience Award for Best Film. It subsequently won awards at the Cleveland International Film Festival, the Brooklyn Film Festival, and the Palm Springs International Festival of Short Films.

In 2021, it was nominated for the Academy Award for Best Live Action Short Film and won the BAFTA Award for Best Short Film.

== Reception ==
The film received 5-star reviews by the UK Film Review and Eye for Film, and 4-star reviews by For Reel and View of the Arts. Madison Ford, writing in the UK Film Review, described the film as "an eye-opening piece of art that captivates from the offset", whilst Taylor Beaumont in For Reel writes that the film is a "fantastic showcase for the restrained but powerful acting talents of Saleh Bakri and... a powerful snapshot of the humanity some of us sacrifice just to buy our eggs for the week". In an interview with Nabulsi, film journalist E. Nina Rothe wrote that the film's name can refer to both a gift and the present day.

A Hebrew-language review from Amir Bogen in Ynet negatively compared The Present with the Israeli film White Eye, accusing the film of "emotional exploitation" and criticizing "the simplicity with which [Nablusi] addresses the issue...". Bogen also claimed the film presented "a loss of authenticity to the situation", noting that the Israeli soldiers in the film spoke Hebrew with Arabic accents, and implied the film was false in its depiction of Israel occupying the West Bank.

== See also ==
- Cinema of Palestine
- List of Palestinian submissions for the Academy Award for Best International Feature Film
