= Helga Tawil-Souri =

Palestinian American academic

Helga Tawil Souri
- Born: November 16, 1969 (age 56); Kuwait

Academic work
- Era: Contemporary
- School or tradition: Critical theory, political economy

Helga Tawil-Souri (Arabic: هلجا طويل-الصوري) (born in Kuwait in 1969) is a Palestinian-American Associate Professor of Media, Culture, and Communication, an associate professor of Middle East and Islamic Studies and a Director of Graduate Studies New York University Steinhardt. Her work focuses on technology, media, culture, territory and politics, with a focus on Palestine and Israel.

She has also produced a number of documentary films.

Tawil-Souri holds a BA from McGill University (1992), an MA from the University of Southern California’s Annenberg School for Communication (1994), and a PhD from the School of Journalism and Mass Communication at the University of Colorado, Boulder (2005).

== Film career ==
Her documentary, "Not Going There, Don’t Belong Here", was completed in 2002 and filmed in November 2001 in various refugee camps in Lebanon. The film has aired on Free Speech TV, various public broadcasting channels in the U.S., at universities and film festivals in the U.S. and abroad.

"i.so.chro.nism: [twenty-four hours in jabaa]" was filmed in the Palestinian West Bank village of Jabaa and completed in 2004. The filmmaker considers it an experimental documentary film that juxtaposes the sounds and images of war and violence with traditional culture, filmed in the West Bank during the Second Intifada.

Tawil-Souri's research has focused on Americanization of the Palestinian Territories through Internet development. One of her book chapters was adapted into a seminar on information society and multiculturalism at Yeungnam University. She was noted in a review of another book chapter for challenging some of the traditional theoretical assumptions in discussions of global communications. Her addressing of controversial issues about politics and video games has been the subject of discussion in the media.

Tawil-Souri was on the editorial board of the Middle East Journal of Culture and Communication, an academic peer-reviewed journal published by Brill.

Tawil-Souri was an invited speaker at the 2nd Annual Social Good Summit along with Desmond Tutu, Elie Wiesel, Ted Turner, Lance Armstrong, Geena Davis and Mary Robinson. The Summit was sponsored by Mashable and the United Nations Foundation, held at the 92nd Street Y in New York City in September, 2011 and brought together global leaders to discuss the most challenging problems facing humanity.

== Articles ==
- Tawil-Souri, Helga (2014). "Cinema as the Space to Transgress Palestine's Territorial Trap". Middle East Journal of Culture and Communication. 7 (2): 169–189. doi:10.1163/18739865-00702005.
- Tawil-Souri, Helga; Aouragh, Miriyam (2014). "Intifada 3.0? Cyber colonialism and Palestinian resistance". Arab Studies Journal. 22 (1): 102–133. JSTOR 24877901.
- Tawil-Souri, Helga (2012). "Digital occupation: Gaza's high-tech enclosure" (PDF). Journal of Palestine Studies. 41 (2): 27–43. doi:10.1525/jps.2012.XLI.2.27.
- Tawil-Souri, Helga (2012). "It's Still About the Power of Place". Middle East Journal of Culture and Communication. 5 (1): 86–95. doi:10.1163/187398612X624418.
- Tawil-Souri, Helga (2011). "Where is the Political in Cultural Studies? In Palestine". International Journal of Cultural Studies. 16 (1): 467–482. doi:10.1177/1367877911408656.
- "Colored Identity: The Politics and Materiality of ID Cards in Palestine/Israel". Social Text. 29 (2 (107)): 67–97. 2011. doi:10.1215/01642472-1259488.
- "The Hi-Tech Enclosure of Gaza". In Larudee, Mahrene, ed. (2011). Gaza – Palestine: Out of the Margins (PDF).
- Tawil-Souri, Helga (2011). "Qalandia Checkpoint as Space and Nonplace". Space and Culture. 14 (1): 4–26. Bibcode:2011SpCul..14....4T. doi:10.1177/1206331210389260.
- "Walking Nicosia, Imagining Jerusalem". Re-Public. 2010. Archived from the original on August 22, 2011.
- Tawil-Souri, Helga (Fall 2009). "Towards Palestinian Cultural Studies" (PDF). Middle East Journal of Communication and Culture. 2 (2): 181–185. doi:10.1163/187398509X12476683126383b. Archived from the original (PDF) on February 22, 2012.
- "New Palestinian Centers: An Ethnography of the 'Checkpoint Economy'". International Journal of Cultural Studies. 12 (3): 217–235. 2009. doi:10.1177/1367877908101572.
- Souri, Helga Tawil (Fall 2007). "The Political Battlefield of Pro-Arab Videogames on Palestinian Streets". Comparative Studies of South Asia, Africa and the Middle East. 27 (3): 536–551. doi:10.1215/1089201x-2007-031.
- Tawil-Souri, Helga (September 2007). "Global and Local Forces for a Nation-State Yet to Be Born: The Paradoxes of Palestinian Television Policies". Westminster Papers in Communication and Culture. 4 (3): 4–25. doi:10.16997/wpcc.94.
- Souri, Helga Tawil (March 2006). "Marginalizing Palestinian Development: Lessons Against Peace". Development. 49 (2): 75–80. doi:10.1057/palgrave.development.1100248.
- "Coming Into Being and Flowing Into Exile: History and Trends in Palestinian Film-Making" (PDF). Nebula. 2 (2): 113–140. June 2005.

== Documentary films ==
- i.so.chro.nism: [twenty-four hours in jabaa]
- Not Going There, Don't Belong Here
