= Hind Shoufani =

Poet and film director and producer

- Born: Hind Illias Shoufani; 1978 (age 47–48); Beirut, Lebanon
- Occupations: poet film director film producer

Hind Shoufani (Arabic:هند شوفاني) is a poet, director, and producer.

== Career ==
Born 1978 in Lebanon and raised in Damascus and Amman, Shoufani has remained a refugee. She currently resides in the Middle East, but has traveled and lived in many cities. Both of her parents are Palestinian activists. Her father, Elias Shoufani, went to Princeton and served as a Palestine Liberation Organization leader and politician. He was also an author who wrote over twenty-five publications. Her mother is an American citizen with an English Literature degree. Shoufani began her education at the Lebanese American University in Beirut where she studied communicative arts. Later she received a Fulbright scholarship to attend NYU in New York where she received a Master of Fine Arts degree in filmmaking.

Shoufani has performed poetry at several events, including the Alwan for the Arts center in NYC, Howard University in Washington D.C., the Institute for Policy Studies in Washington, and the Berlin Poetry Festival in Germany. She has also hosted the Emirates Literacy Festival and the Sikka Art Fair. She is the founder of the Poeticians, which was started in Beirut in 2007, and is a multilingual public reading forum for poets of all backgrounds to perform spoken word and poetry and is held in various cities including Dubai and Beirut. She has two publications of poetry, More Light Than Death Could Bear (Beirut, 2007) and Inkstains on the Edge of Light (Beirut, 2010).

In 2011, she participated in the International Writing Program Fall Residency at the University of Iowa in Iowa City, IA.

== Poetry ==
Shoufani's free verse poetry tackles themes of love, death, lust, identity, Palestinian interests, freedom, and feminist issues in the Arab world.

Her second volume of poetry, Inkstains on the Edge of Light (2010) contains more than 300 pages of free verse poetry and is divided into four chapters: Death, Life, Home, and Lust. Anna Seaman has referred to it as "a frank and personal journey through the loss of her beloved mother to cancer, the distance from and simultaneous bond she feels with her activist father, the struggle and plight of being a Palestinian refugee and the sadness of unrequited love."

Shoufani has referred to her own poetry as "a form of possession." According to her, "Whether I am possessed by a thought or a feeling or a spirit that takes over my body, I'm not sure, but I have to write. When something moves me, poetry comes out and it is not in my control. I know it can be tiring to read, but it is meant to be easily understood and accessible." Shoufani describes her character as a poet as being parallel to her character in life, with traits of being strong, independent, nonconformist and non-conservative, and says that one of her aims is to convey her situation to other Arab women in order to empower them.

== Awards ==
Shoufani's 2015 documentary Trip Along Exodus won the award for Best Non-European Documentary at the European Independent Film Festival in Paris, as well as the Audience Award for best film at the Cairo International Women's film festival.

The 2020 short film The Present, co-written by Shoufani and Farah Nabulsi and edited by Shoufani, won the BAFTA Award for Best Short Film in 2021. It was also nominated for the Academy Award for Best Live Action Short Film.

== Bibliography ==
- Hind Shoufani. More Light Than Death Could Bear. Beirut, 2007. ISBN 978-9953010335
- Hind Shoufani. Inkstains on the Edge of Light. Whole World Press, 2010. ISBN 978-0-9845128-9-8

== Films and Documentaries ==
- They Planted Strange Trees. Post-production.
- We Take Back Mountains, 8 minutes, 2019.
- Capsule Arts, 5 minutes, 2018.
- Journey of Rediscovery, 3 minutes, 2018.
- Emergence of a Union, 28 minutes, 2016.
- Chico - Spinning Since '64, 8 minutes, 2015.
- Trip Along Exodus, documentary, 120 minutes, 2015.
- This War on Love: (In Development)- feature-length drama. Expected release 2013
- Journey in Migration, feature documentary, 2010. (In Post-production)
- Guidebook to Forgetfulness, 60 minutes, 2009.
- Carencia, 24 P, feature length, 2005. Written, directed, produced and edited on Avid Express.
- New Roses, digital video, 13 minutes, 2003. Written, directed, designed and edited on Avid Express.
- Medical Marijuana Barbie, video, 12 minutes, 2003.
- Places on the Inside, 16 mm film, B & W, 5 minutes, 2002.
- A Life the Color of Blood, video, 12 minutes, 1998.
