= Valerio Rocco Orlando =

Italian artist (born 1978)

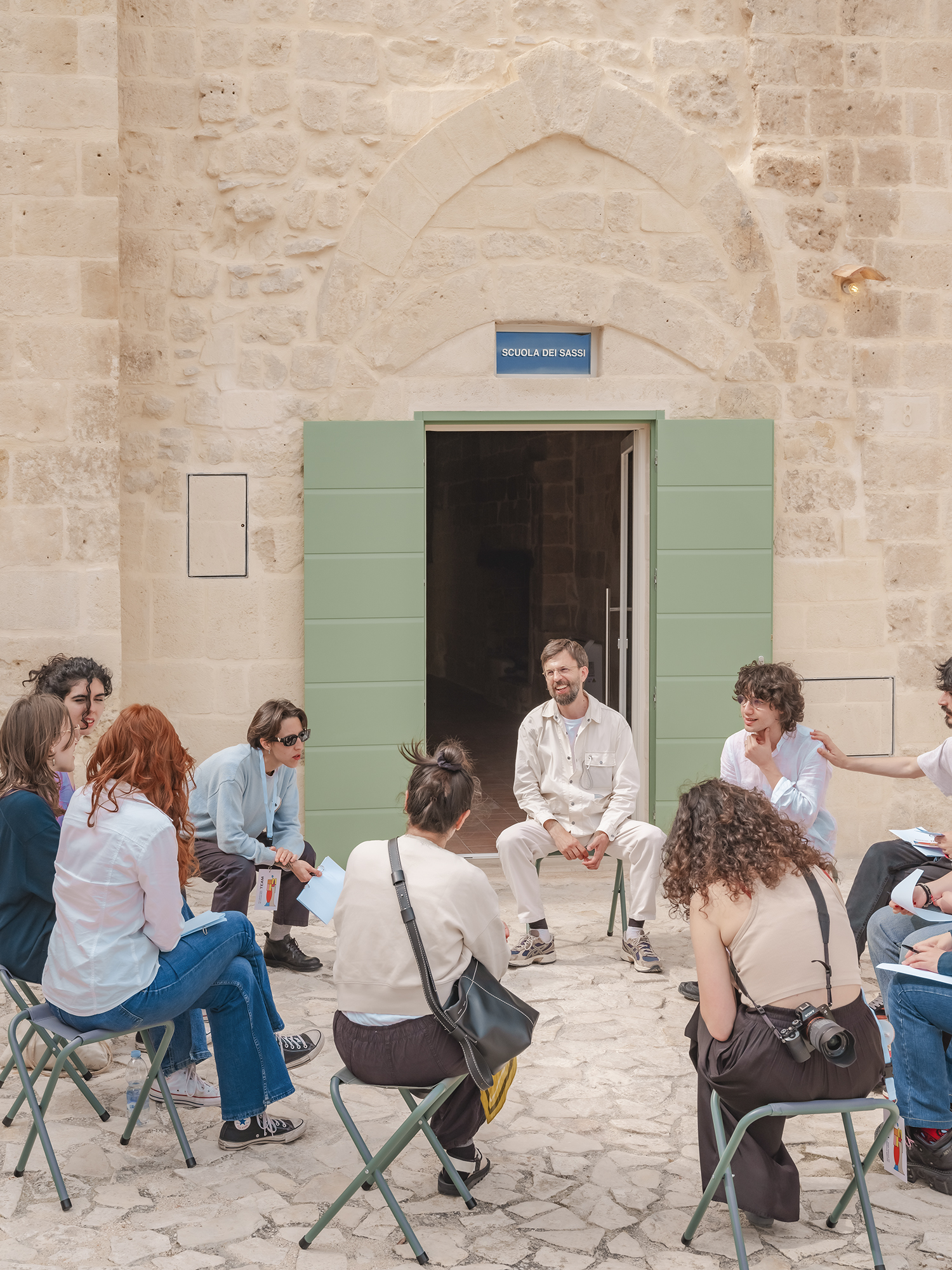
- Orlando at the Scuola dei Sassi in Matera
- Born: 1978 (age 47–48); Milan, Italy
- Known for: Multimedia art
- Awards: Prix Carta Bianca, VII VAF Foundation Art Prize, MMCA Korea International Artist Fellowship, Civitella Ranieri Foundation Visual Arts Fellowship, ISCP New York Prize
- Website: valerioroccoorlando.com

Valerio Rocco Orlando (Italian pronunciation: [vaˈlɛːrjo ˈrɔkko orˈlando]) (born 1978 in Milan, Italy) is an Italian artist, researcher, and professor. He holds a PhD in Engineering-based Architecture and Urban Planning from Sapienza University of Rome.

His collaborations include working with French philosopher Jean-Luc Nancy, English composer Michael Nyman, artists Gilbert & George, Ugo Rondinone and Liam Gillick, supermodel Eva Riccobono, actors Saleh Bakri, Alba Rohrwacher, sociologist Boaventura de Sousa Santos, and psychoanalyst Luigi Zoja.

Orlando has exhibited widely and represented Italy at the 11th Havana Biennial (2012). A selection of solo institutional exhibitions include: The Reverse Grand Tour, Galleria Nazionale d'Arte Moderna e Contemporanea, Rome (2013); The Sphere of the Between, Korea Foundation, Seoul (2015); What Education for Mars?, Museo Marino Marini, Florence (2015); Portami al Confine, MUSMA, Matera (2016); Valerio Rocco Orlando, Santiago Museum of Contemporary Art, Santiago (2017); Dialogue with the Unseen, MUDEC Museo delle Culture, Milan (2019); Vite operose, GAMeC, Bergamo (2023); Community Specific Archive, CSAC – University of Parma, Parma (2024).

Orlando's works have been featured in Artforum, ArtReview, Contemporary (magazine), Corriere della Sera, Domus (magazine), Flash Art, Frieze (magazine), Il manifesto, La Repubblica, L'Uomo Vogue, Modern Painters (magazine), The Korea Herald, Vogue Italia and W magazine.

== Artistic practice ==
Since 2002, Orlando has worked on several community-based projects, creating different cycles of installations focused on the relationship between individual and collective identity. His first project (The Sentimental Glance, 2002-2007) is a seven-channel video installation built like a stratified Bildungsroman populated by the portraits of six young women on the threshold between childhood, adolescence, and adulthood.

Dealing with themes such as the relationship between artists and society (The Reverse Grand Tour, 2012), the feelings of newer generations towards folklore (Bisiàc, 2007), the exchanges between a couple (Lover’s Discourse, 2010) and within a school as an institution (What Education for Mars?, 2011-2013). Orlando carries out a personal exploration of portraiture, using the activities of meeting and dialogue as tools. By defining art as a process of analysis and mutual knowledge, Orlando explores and tells everyday life stories, taken from personal and social context, recomposing them as the pieces of a mosaic within an image of the whole.

"To investigate a universal theme, Valerio Rocco Orlando thinks, builds, and weaves relationships with the other, in such a direct and essential way that the artist’s main medium become the encounter itself. Einfülhung, what German philosophers refer to as empathy, is both a prerequisite and a direct consequence of the methodology of Orlando. Conceiving the production as a long-term process based on trust and intimacy, the audience gets to feel the other, participating in his points of view and feelings, by mirroring and questioning their own experience. Only through this new exchange with the viewer the research is completed and the artwork can respond to its function of radical education".

One of his most recent works (Dialogue with the Unseen, 2019) is a spiritual pilgrimage and a political journey to the Holy Land. Starting from a collaboration with Palestinian actor Saleh Bakri, this video installation is a collection of encounters between individuals who are questioning their own relationships with Nature and Society.

Orlando’s long-term initiative (Scuola dei Sassi, 2024) is a free, intercultural, and transpedagogical program conceptualised as a permanent art intervention in the city of Matera, Italy.

== Academics and conferences ==
Orlando gave lectures and workshops in some of the most renowned faculties and institutions worldwide, among others: Accademia di Belle Arti di Roma, Rome; Accademia Carrara di Belle Arti di Bergamo, Bergamo; Accademia di Belle Arti di Firenze, Florence; Accademia di Belle Arti, L'Aquila; Accademia di Belle Arti di Napoli, Naples; Bezalel Academy of Arts and Design, Jerusalem; Bocconi University, Milan; Brera Academy, Milan; Dongduk Women's University, Seoul; Ewha Womans University, Seoul; Instituto Superior de Arte, Havana; International Studio & Curatorial Program (ISCP), New York City; Istituto Europeo di Design, Milan; IULM University of Milan, Milan; Kookmin University, Seoul; Korea Foundation, Seoul; MAXXI – National Museum of the 21st Century Arts, Rome; Musei Capitolini, Rome; Palazzo Strozzi, Florence; Parsons The New School for Design, New York City; Politecnico di Milano, Milan; The Valley School, Bangalore; Università Cattolica del Sacro Cuore, Milan; University of Basel, Basel.

== Awards ==
Orlando has been the recipient of numerous awards, including the ISCP New York Prize (2009), an International Artist Fellowship from the MMCA National Museum of Modern and Contemporary Art Korea (2014), and the Kunstpreis VAF Stiftung (2016). He has also obtained the support of the Italian Council (2020) and the Contemporary Art Plan (2023) from the Ministry of Culture (Italy).

== Public collections ==
- A. M. Qattan Foundation, Ramallah
- Centro de Arte Contemporáneo Wifredo Lam, Havana
- Centro per l'arte contemporanea Luigi Pecci, Prato
- CSAC - University of Parma, Parma
- Fundação Calouste Gulbenkian, Lisbon
- Galleria Nazionale d'Arte Moderna e Contemporanea, Rome
- Galleria d'Arte Moderna e Contemporanea, Bergamo
- Museo MAGA, Gallarate
- Museo del Novecento, Milan
- Museo Irene Brin, Bordighera
- Museum of Modern and Contemporary Art of Trento and Rovereto, Rovereto
- Museum of Contemporary Art of Rome, Rome
- MUSMA Museo della Scultura Contemporanea Matera, Matera
- Panza Collection, Varese
- Villa Reale, Monza

== Bibliography ==
- Community Specific Archive, Silvana Editoriale, 2024. ISBN 9788836659234
- Vite operose, Skira, 2024. ISBN 9788857252445
- Portami al Confine, Silvana Editoriale, 2021. ISBN 9788836646395
- Uno alla volta. Comunità e Partecipazione, Postmedia Books, 2020. ISBN 9788874902774
- What Education for Mars?, Museo Marino Marini, 2016. ISBN 9788859616269
- The Sphere of the Between, Korea Foundation, 2015. ISBN 9788994027074
- The Reverse Grand Tour, Galleria Nazionale d'Arte Moderna e Contemporanea, 2013. ISBN 9788889965443
- Endless, Mousse Publishing, 2011. ISBN 9788896501443
