= The Teacher (2023 film) =

2023 film by Farah Nabulsi

- Festival poster
- Directed by: Farah Nabulsi
- Written by: Farah Nabulsi
- Produced by: Sawsan Asfari; Farah Nabulsi; Ossama Bawardi
- Starring: Saleh Bakri; Imogen Poots; Muhammad Abed Elrahman
- Cinematography: Gilles Porte
- Edited by: Mike Pike
- Music by: Alex Baranowski
- Production companies: Cocoon Films; Native Liberty Productions; Philistine Films
- Distributed by: Goodfellas (International); Front Row Filmed Entertainment (MENA)
- Release date: 9 September 2023 (Toronto)
- Running time: 115 minutes
- Countries: United Kingdom; Qatar; Palestine
- Languages: English; Arabic
- Box office: $243,155

The Teacher (Arabic: الأستاذ) is a 2023 drama film written and directed by Farah Nabulsi. It stars Saleh Bakri, Imogen Poots, and Muhammad Abed Elrahman. It premiered at the 48th Toronto International Film Festival on 9 September 2023.

== Premise ==
Basem is a Palestinian schoolteacher who finds himself caught between his commitment to political resistance and his role as a father figure to one of his students, Adam. Set in the present-day West Bank in the occupied Palestinian Territories, Nabulsi described the film as a "human drama set in a political landscape" and "a story about characters that represent a severely marginalised and underrepresented people," stating that she "needed to make this film to cope with the injustice I've witnessed."

== Cast ==
- Saleh Bakri as Basem El Saleh
- Imogen Poots as Lisa
- Muhammad Abed Elrahman as Adam
- Stanley Townsend as Simon Cohen
- Muayyad Abd Elsamad
- Andrea Irvine
- Nabil Al Raee
- Mahmood Bakri
- Paul Herzberg

== Production ==
The film was shot entirely in the West Bank, particularly in Nablus, over three months. Regarding the choice to film in Palestine, director Farah Nabulsi "felt there was a responsibility" to do so, stating, "I did contemplate the path of least resistance, like doing it in Jordan or a different location. But I thought it a privilege to be able to actually enter Palestine and make a film in Palestine, which many Palestinian filmmakers can't." In an interview with Deadline, she described "the emotional and mental toll" of leading a team whilst "trying to do justice to a reality that's unfolding around you." She cited Israeli settlers torching olive trees in a Palestinian village nearby while filming, as well as a military raid on Nablus which occurred just a few kilometres from where the crew had been shooting a few hours earlier.

== Release ==
The film premiered at the Toronto International Film Festival on 9 September 2023, with an exclusive clip released by Variety two days prior. The film had a theatrical release in the MENA region from February 2024, followed by releases in the United Kingdom and Northern Ireland in September 2024, the United States and Canada in April 2025, and Italy in December 2025. It became available on-demand in the MENA region via Google Play, Apple TV, and OSN TV in December 2024. In February 2025, Watermelon Pictures acquired the U.S. distribution rights and the film received a theatrical release across North America from 11 April 2025. In May 2025, it became available on-demand in the UK, Ireland, USA, and Canada via YouTube, Prime Video, Apple TV+, and other platforms.

== Reception ==
=== Critical response ===
On the review aggregator website Rotten Tomatoes, 83% of 29 critics' reviews are positive. Metacritic, which uses a weighted average, assigned the film a score of 62 out of 100, based on 12 critics, indicating "generally favorable" reviews.

Vogue's Taylor Antrim included the film on his list of "10 Movies From the Toronto Film Festival to Get Excited About", commending the performances of Saleh Bakri and Imogen Poots and writing that he felt "moved and gripped by the film's exploration of Palestinian anger and grief."

Sheri Linden of The Hollywood Reporter described the film as "riveting", "eye-opening", and "an intimate exploration of life in occupied Palestine". She also praised the performances of Bakri, Poots, and Muhammad Abed Elrahman.

Screen Daily's Tim Grierson commended Nabulsi for "[tackling] a thorny issue with complexity, crafting a drama with several tendrils reaching out in all different directions, illustrating how the Israeli/Palestinian dispute impacts so many in the region."

Alex Ritman of The Hollywood Reporter called the film a "Toronto hidden gem" and Screen Daily listed The Teacher as one of the “20 stand-out titles from Toronto 2023."

While acknowledging the "necessary counterbalance" the film provided "in a climate where Palestinian perspectives on the conflict are given limited opportunity for exposure," IndieWire criticised the film for focusing too much on Basem and Lisa's relationship, as this gave "short shrift to dynamics that carry much more necessity and weight."

=== Accolades ===
Award	Year	Category	Recipient(s)	Result	Ref.
Belgrade FEST	2024	Best Actor	Saleh Bakri	Won	
British Academy Film Awards	2025	Outstanding Debut by a British Writer, Director or Producer	The Teacher	Longlisted	
Brooklyn Film Festival	2024	Audience Award	The Teacher	Won	
Critics Awards for Arab Films	2024	Best Feature Film	The Teacher	Nominated	
Critics Awards for Arab Films	2024	Best Actor	Saleh Bakri	Won	
Critics Awards for Arab Films	2024	Best Music	Alex Baranowski	Nominated	
Critics Awards for Arab Films	2024	Best Cinematography	Gilles Porte	Nominated	
Cyprus Film Days	2024	Audience Award	The Teacher	Won	
Filmfest DC	2024	Audience Award	The Teacher	Won	
Galway Film Fleadh	2024	Best International Film	The Teacher	Won	
Kosmorama	2024	Best Film	The Teacher	Won	
Maine International Film Festival	2024	Audience Favorite	The Teacher	Won	
Red Sea International Film Festival	2023	Jury Prize	The Teacher	Won	
Red Sea International Film Festival	2023	Best Actor	Saleh Bakri	Won	
San Francisco International Film Festival	2024	Audience Award	The Teacher	Won	
San Francisco International Film Festival	2024	Global Visions	The Teacher	Nominated	
