= When the Sea Rises =

2004 French-Belgian romantic comedy film

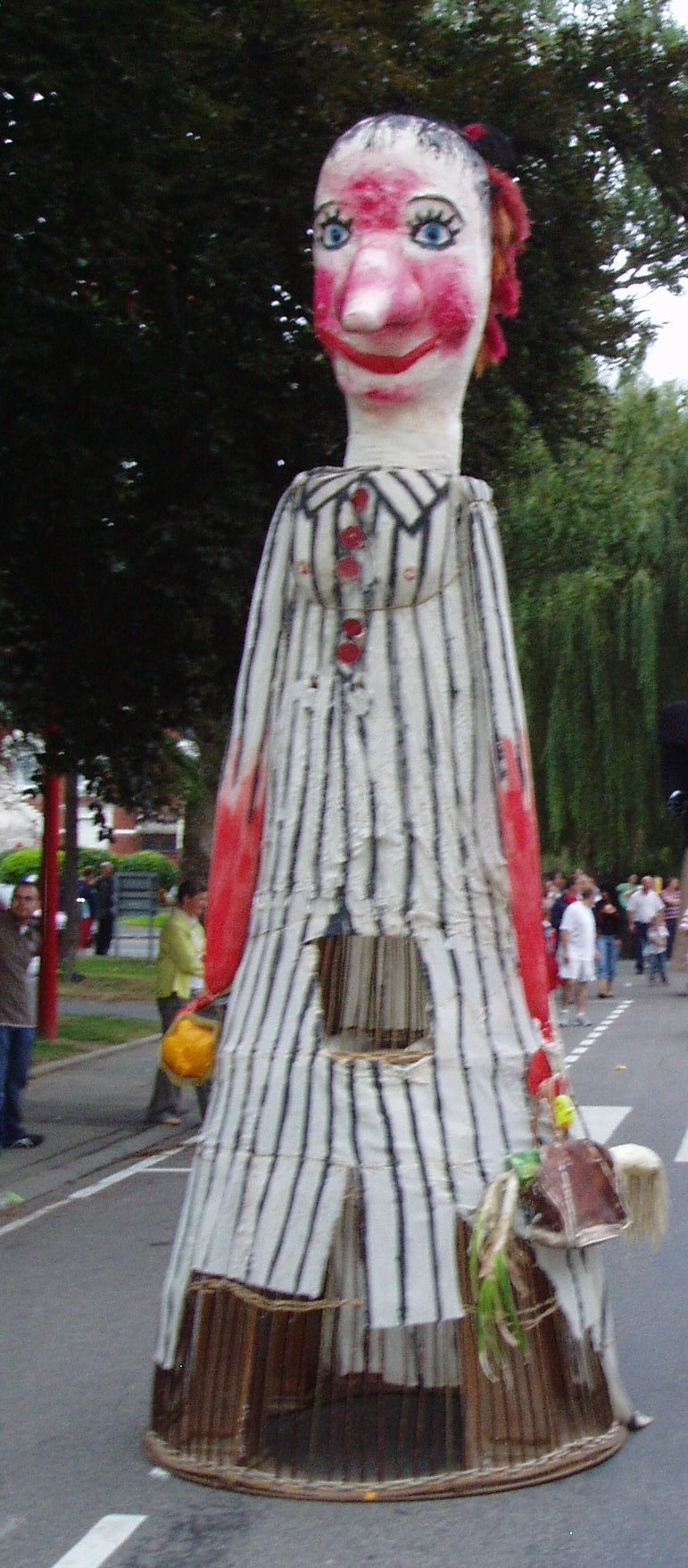
- Directed by: Yolande Moreau; Gilles Porte
- Written by: Yolande Moreau; Gilles Porte
- Produced by: Humbert Balsan; Catherine Burniaux
- Starring: Yolande Moreau; François Morel; Jackie Berroyer
- Cinematography: Gilles Porte
- Edited by: Éric Renault
- Music by: Philippe Rouèche
- Production companies: Ognon Pictures; Stromboli Pictures; R.T.B.F.
- Distributed by: Pirates Distribution
- Release date: 27 October 2004 (France)
- Running time: 90 minutes
- Countries: France; Belgium
- Language: French
- Budget: $1.5 million
- Box office: $1.4 million

When the Sea Rises (French: Quand la mer monte...) is a 2004 French-Belgian romantic comedy film directed by Yolande Moreau and Gilles Porte. It was Moreau's directorial debut.

== Plot ==
Irène is an actress who performs her one-person show all over northern France. One day she is heading for a new town when her car breaks down. In the countryside she is picked up by a travelling stranger who rides a Scooter. He introduces himself as Dries and gives her a lift. She rewards him with a ticket for her show. When he arrives there she involves him in her performance. The next evening he returns and feels he must protect her against perturbators in the audience. She doesn't appreciate the way he tries to take care of this matter. They have a considerable dispute which eventually ends in a reconciliation. This marks the beginning of a love affair.

== Cast ==
- Yolande Moreau as Irène
- Wim Willaert as Dries
- Olivier Gourmet as The cop
- Jackie Berroyer as Béthune
- Philippe Duquesne as Café's owner
- Jacques Bonnaffé as The server
- Séverine Caneele as The maid
- Bouli Lanners as The market's owner
- Jan Hammenecker as Jan
- Vincent Mahieu as Yves
- Nand Buyl as Dries's father
- Emmy Leemans as Dries's mother
- Jean-François Picotin as Fifi
- François Morel as TV Host

== Critical reception ==
The film received critical acclaim. Review aggregator Rotten Tomatoes reports that 90% of 20 critics gave the film a positive review, for an average rating of 6.5 out of 10. Metacritic gave the film a score of 62 out of 100, based on eight critics.

== Background ==
The film title is an homage to the French folk singer Raoul de Godewaersvelde whose song "Quand la mer monte" is a re-occurring theme throughout the film.

== Awards ==
- César Award for Best Debut (Yolande Moreau and Gilles Porte)
- César Award for Best Actress (Yolande Moreau)
- Louis Delluc Prize for Best First Film

== See also ==
- Cinema of France
- Cinema of Belgium
- List of French language films
