= Joudie Kalla =

Palestinian-British chef and food writer

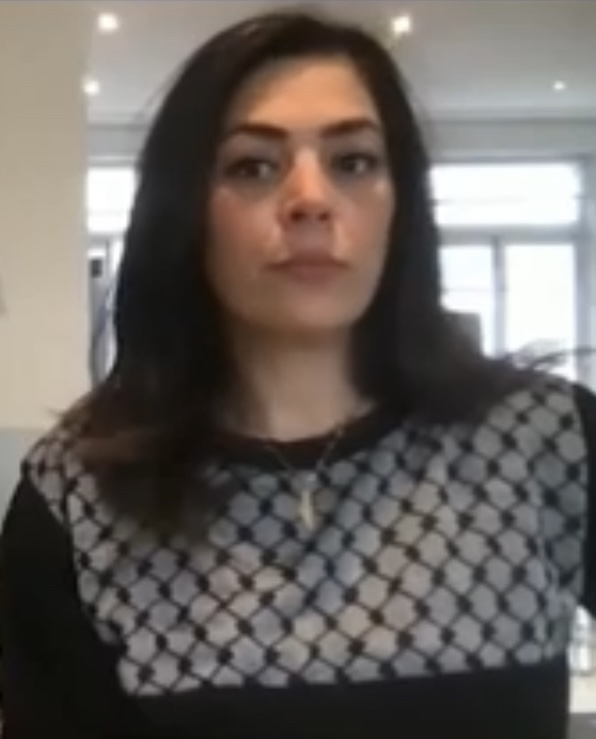
Kalla in 2021

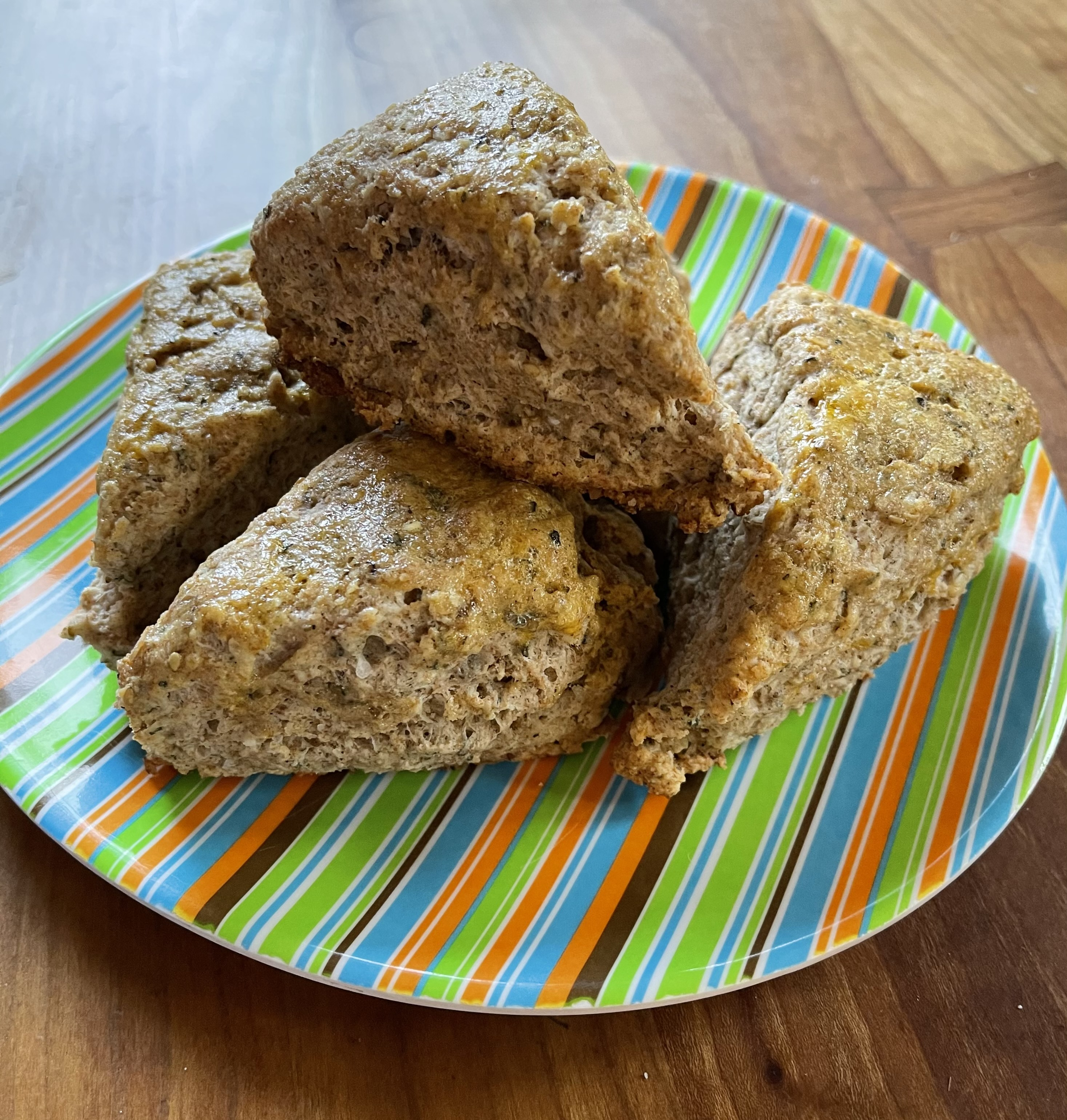
Za'atar Scones adapted from Joudie Kalla, Palestine on a Plate

Joudie Kalla is a Palestinian-British chef and food writer. She is the author of two prizewinning cookbooks, Palestine on a Plate: Memories from My Mother’s Kitchen (2016), and Baladi: A Celebration of Food from Land and Sea (2018), and has featured in venues like The New York Times, The Guardian, and Al Jazeera.

== Family, education, and career ==
Joudie Kalla was born in Syria to parents of Palestinian origin. She is one of five children. Her family traces roots to Ramallah, Jaffa, Lydda, Safed. She has noted that her grandparents fled for their lives, to Syria during the Nakba in 1948.

Joudie Kalla pursued undergraduate studies at Kingston University, where she studied Art History, Architecture, and Design. She pursued a master's degree at the Sorbonne in Paris, where she studied French culture and civilization. She trained at Leiths School of Food and Wine in London before working at multiple London restaurants, including Gordon Ramsey's Pengelley's under Ian Pengelley; Daphne's; and Papillon with Michelin-starred chef David Duverger. She cites her Palestinian upbringing, including her family's stories and cooking experiences, as the main inspiration for her exploration of traditional Palestinian and Middle Eastern cuisine.

Joudie Kalla ran her own catering business and, from 2010 to 2013, owned a deli in London called Baity Kitchen ("My House" Kitchen). Following this, Kalla hosted Palestinian supper clubs at Phene and other restaurants in London. In an interview with British Muslim TV, she explained that she regards the supper clubs as a way to share her culture with others and to give a voice and place to other Palestinians living in London. The Guardian has also featured Joudie Kalla as a Guest Cook. She has also featured as a guest Instagrammer for the public art project and former Pittsburgh-based restaurant, Conflict Kitchen.

== Cookbooks ==
Joudie Kalla published her first cookbook, Palestine on a Plate: Memories from My Mother’s Kitchen, in 2016. Recommended by The New York Times, it won the "Best Arab Cuisine Book" award from the Gourmand World Cookbook Awards in 2016. The Independent (London) called Palestine on a Plate a "Best Buy of 2016" among cookbooks. Palestine on a Plate focuses on dishes from the region, the recipes for which Kalla secured from her mother, father, and grandmother. Writing for Bloomberg, and acknowledging Kalla's efforts to use the cookbook as a mode of Palestinian cultural advocacy, Deena Shanker described it as "equal parts cookbook, history and cri de coeur." Along these lines, Kalla asserts in the cookbook that, "Palestinian food is an identity."

Joudie Kalla's second cookbook, Baladi: A Celebration of Food from Land and Sea, appeared in 2018 to acclaim from Nigella Lawson and received positive reviews. From the Times of London, it won a Times Food Book of the Year award in 2018. The title of the cookbook means "my land" or "my country," referring to Palestine. Kalla explained in the book that she collected recipes and images for Baladi from her social media followers.

Although she identifies the food in her cookbooks as Palestinian, some of the recipes reflect British influences, such as her za'tar scones. Others include new ingredients in the Palestinian repertoire, such as chocolate. In some cases, as she acknowledges in Palestine on a Plate and Baladi, her recipes are for dishes that she improvised when she was running her restaurant and supper clubs in London.

Joudie also contributed a short essay and recipe to the cookbook On The Hummus Route by Ariel Rosenthal, Orly Peli-Bronshtein and Dan Alexander though she later claimed she and other Palestinian chefs had been misled and that the book 'normalises the occupation, something I never would have dreamed of lending a hand to and something i will never do again'.
