= Elias Shoufani =

Palestinian scholar and politician (1932–2013)

- إلياس شوفاني
- Born: Elias Shukri Shoufani; 1932; Mi'ilya, Mandatory Palestine
- Died: 26 January 2013 (aged 80–81); Damascus, Syria
- Education: Hebrew University; Princeton University
- Years active: 1960s–1980s
- Political party: Fatah (until 1983)

Academic background
- Thesis: Al-Riddah and the Muslim Conquest of Arabia (1968)

Academic work
- Discipline: History
- Sub-discipline: History of Islam
- Institutions: Georgetown University; University of Maryland, College Park

Elias Shoufani (Arabic: إلياس شوفاني; 1932–26 January 2013) was a Palestinian author and historian whose studies were mostly about the history of Islam and the Israeli affairs. He was one of the leading Arab scholars in the latter topic. He was a member of the Fatah movement until 1983 when he joined the dissident group in Damascus, becoming part of the Fatah Uprising.

== Early life and education ==
Shoufani was born in Mi'ilya in the Galilee in 1932. His father, Shukri, was a community leader in Mi'ilya which was a Christian Arab village. Elias had two brothers, Naim and Muhanna. The family owned a flour mill in the Wadi al-Qarn stream.

Their home in Mi'ilya was demolished by the Israel Defense Forces in 1948. The Israeli soldiers killed Nimr, the dog of the family, who was trying to protect the house. Elias and his family had to leave Mi'ilya after this incident on 30 October 1948.

Shoufani graduated from the Teachers' Institute in Jaffa in 1949. He received a degree from the Hebrew University in 1962. He obtained a master's degree in 1965 and a PhD in Islamic studies in 1968 from Princeton University.

== Career and activities ==
Shoufani worked as a teacher from 1949 to 1951. He worked at the Georgetown University and then at the University of Maryland, College Park as a faculty member between 1967 and 1972. In the latter he worked as an associate professor of history. He left his teaching post and settled in Beirut in 1972. There he worked at the Institute for Palestine Studies (IPS) as a translator and was named as the head of the IPS's research department in 1973 which he held until 1982. He also worked for the Palestine Liberation Organization Center in Beirut. He became a member of the Fatah's Revolutionary Council in 1980.

Shoufani left Beirut in 1982 when the Palestinian revolutionaries was forced to leave Lebanon. He settled in Damascus, Syria, and continued to work for the IPS. He became a member of the dissident group, known as Fatah Intifada, against the Fatah leadership. However, he left the group and focused on his studies.

=== Work ===
Shoufani is one of the Palestinian scholars who analysed the causes and outcomes of the Nakba. He published books and articles on the history of the Middle East and Palestine. One of his books is Al-Riddah and the Muslim Conquest of Arabia (1973) which was an extended version of his PhD thesis. He published an autobiography in Arabic in 2009. He translated Mudhakkirāt Simsār Arāḍı̄ Ṣuhyūnı̄ (Arabic: Memoirs of a Zionist land broker) in 2010.

== Personal life and death ==
Shoufani was married to an American woman, and they divorced before he left the US. He later married Yasmine, an American woman of Palestinian origin. They had two daughters.

Shoufani died of a heart attack in Damascus on 26 January 2013.

== Legacy ==
His daughter, Hind Shoufani, produced a documentary, Trip Along Exodus, in memory of Elias Shoufani. It was premiered at the Dubai International Film Festival in December 2014.
