= Zaki Chehab =

Journalist

Zaki Chehab (born 1956) is an Arab journalist. Founder and Editor-in-Chief of ArabsToday.net, an Arabic-language news website.

Until October 2009, Chehab was London Bureau Chief of Al Hayat – LBC TV. He has covered the Middle East for a variety of newsmedia including The Guardian, CNN, and the BBC. Chehab has covered numerous Middle Eastern conflicts, including the Lebanese Civil War, the 1982 Lebanon War, the First Intifada, and the wars in Yemen, the Gulf and Afghanistan.

== Early life ==
Chehab was born in Tyre, South Lebanon on 29 December 1956.

== Career as a journalist ==
In 1985, Chehab moved to London to work for London-based Arab newspapers and magazines. He eventually joined Al Hayat where he would become Political Editor.

In the late 1980s he covered the Iran–Iraq War, the ongoing Israeli–Palestinian conflict in the West Bank and Gaza, the 1994 civil war in Yemen, the Somali Civil War, the Eritrean–Ethiopian War, and the Algerian Civil War.

Following the September 11, 2001 attacks, Chehab moved into television, analysing the events in Pakistan and Afghanistan and the Arab–Israeli conflict for CNN, BBC, Channel 4 and others. He became an LBC (Lebanese Broadcasting Corporation) Senior Editor based in London, while maintaining his position at Al Hayat. Chehab reported from the war in Afghanistan. In 2003, he spent several months in Iraq during the war and its aftermath, reporting from Iraqi cities as they fell to American and British forces. On 30 June 2003 on LBC TV, he became the first journalist in the world to broadcast interviews with members of the Iraqi resistance.

He is the author of the 2005 book Iraq Ablaze: Inside the Insurgency and the 2007 book Inside Hamas: The Untold Story of the Militant Islamic Movement both published by I.B. Tauris in London and Nation Books in New York City.

Chehab appeared on The Daily Show with Jon Stewart on 21 May 2007.

== Bibliography ==
- Chehab, Zaki (2005), Inside the Resistance: The Iraqi Insurgency and the Future of the Middle East – Nation Books
- Chehab, Zaki (2007), Inside Hamas: The Untold Story of the Militant Islamic Movement – Nation Books

=== Articles ===
- Nine articles from New Statesman
- "Civil War Can Be Averted". The Washington Post. 10 December 2005.
