= Middle East Journal of Culture and Communication =

- Discipline: Media studies, communication studies
- Language: English
- Edited by: Omar al-Ghazzi, Zahera Harb, Sune Haugbolle, Tarik Sabry

Publication details
- History: 2008–present
- Publisher: Brill Publishers
- Frequency: Triannual

Standard abbreviations
- ISO 4: Middle East J. Cult. Commun.

Indexing
- ISSN: 1873-9857 (print); 1873-9865 (web)
- LCCN: 2008236336
- OCLC no.: 150405257

Links
- Journal homepage

The Middle East Journal of Culture and Communication is a triannual peer-reviewed academic journal with a focus on culture, communication and politics in the Middle East. It was established in 2008 and is published by Brill Publishers. The editors-in-chief are Omar al-Ghazzi (London School of Economics), Zahera Harb (City University of London), Sune Haugbolle (Roskilde University), and Tarik Sabry (University of Westminster).

== Abstracting and indexing ==
The journal is abstracted and indexed in the following databases:

- Emerging Sources Citation Index
- EBSCO databases
- ERIH PLUS
- Index Islamicus
- Modern Language Association Database
- Scopus
