= P'tit Quinquin (song) =

Song by Alexandre Desrousseaux

"P'tit Quinquin" is a song by Alexandre Desrousseaux which was written in the Picard language (the local dialect of which is called chti or chtimi in Nord-Pas-de-Calais) in 1853.

Picard is a — now-endangered — language closely related to French, and is spoken in Hauts-de-France region (a merger of Nord-Pas-de-Calais and Picardy) of France and in parts of the Belgian region of Wallonia.

This simple lullaby (P'tit quinquin means "little child") demonstrates the revival of Picard in the area, to the extent that it became the marching song of the northern soldiers leaving for the Franco-Prussian War of 1870. Today it could be called the unofficial anthem of the French city of Lille, and more generally of the Nord-Pas-de-Calais region of France.

The famous refrain (in Picard):
might be translated into French as:
Dors, min p'tit quinquin,

Min p'tit pouchin, min gros rojin
Te m'fras du chagrin
Si te n'dors point ch'qu'à d'main.

Dors, mon petit enfant,

Mon petit poussin, mon gros raisin,
Tu me feras du chagrin
Si tu ne dors pas jusqu'à demain.

And into English literally as:

"Sleep, my little child,

My little chick, my plump grape,
You will cause me grief
If you don't sleep until tomorrow."

Extended Picard lyrics (after first stanza):

Picard	English
Ainsi l'aut' jour eun' pauv' dintellière, In amiclotant sin p'tit garchon Qui, d'puis tros quarts d'heure, n'faijot que d'braire, Tachot d'l'indormir par eun' canchon. Ell' li dijot : « min Narcisse, D'main t'aras du pain d'épice, Du chuc à gogo, Si t'es sache et qu'te fais dodo. »: R'frain -; Et si te m'laiche faire eun' bonn' semaine, J'irai dégager tin biau sarrau, Tin patalon d'drap, tin giliet d'laine... Comme un p'tit milord te s'ras farau ! J't'acaterai, l'jour de l'ducasse, Un porichinell' cocasse, Un turlututu, Pour juer l'air du Capiau-Pointu.: R'frain -; Nous irons dins l'cour Jeannette-à-Vaques, Vir les marionnett's. Comm' te riras, Quand t'intindras dire : « Un doup' pou Jacques ! » Pa' l'porichinell' qui parl' magas !... Te li mettras dins s'menotte, Au lieu d'doupe, un rond d'carotte ! I t'dira : « Merci ! » Pins' comm' nous arons du plaisi !: R'frain -; Et si par hasard sin maîte s'fâche, Ch'est alors Narciss' que nous rirons ! Sans n'n avoir invi', j'prindrai m'n air mache, J'li dirai sin nom et ses sournoms, J'li dirai des fariboles, I m'in répondra des drôles, Infin, un chacun Verra deux pestac' au lieu d'un...: R'frain -; Allons serr' tes yeux, dors min bonhomme, J'vas dire eun' prière à P'tit-Hésus, Pour qu'i vienne ichi pindant tin somme, T'fai' rêver qu'j'ai les mains plein's d'écus, Pour qu'i t'apporte eun' coquille, Avec su chirop qui guile Tout l'long d'tin minton... Te pourléqu'ras tros heur's de long !: R'frain -; L'mos qui vient, d'Saint-Nicolas ch'est l'fiête, Pour sûr, au soir, i viendra t'trouver. I t'f'ra un sermon, et t'l'aich'ra mette In d'zous du balot, un grand painnier. I l'rimplira, si t'es sache, D'séquois qui t'rindront bénache, Sans cha, sin baudet T'invoira un grand martinet.: R'frain -; Ni les marionnettes, ni l'pain n'épice N'ont produit d'effet. Mais l'martinet A vit' rappajé l'petit Narcisse, Qui craingnot d'vir arriver l'baudet. Il a dit s'canchon-dormoire. S'mèr' l'a mis dins s'n ochennoire, A r'pris sin coussin, Et répété vingt fos che r'frain : Dors min p'tit Quinquin, Min p'tit pouchin, Min gros rojin; Te m'f'ras du chagrin, Si te n'dors point j'qu'à d'main.	The other day a poor lacemaker While clothing her little son Who had been crying for three quarters of an hour Did her best to put him to sleep with a song She said to him: "my Narcisse, Tomorrow you'll have gingerbread Plenty of sugar If you behave and fall asleep -chorus- And if you let me have a good week I'll go and get your nice smock Your trousers and wool jacket You'll be pompous as a lord! I'll buy, on festival day A fun punch puppet A flute To play the Pointy-Hat tune -chorus- We'll go to the Jeanette-à-Vaques To see the puppets. You'll laugh so much When you'll hear " a coin for Jacques !" Said by the clumsy-talking puppet You'll put in his hand Not a coin, but a chunk of carrot! He'll thank you! Think of how much fun we'll have! -chorus- And if it so happens his master gets angry Then, Narcisse, we'll laugh! Not meaning it, I'll look angry I'll tell it his name and nicknames I'll tell him nonsense And so will he This way, everyone Will get to see not one, but two shows... -chorus- So close your eyes, fall asleep my boy, I'll say a prayer to baby Jesus, So he'll come as you sleep, To make you dream my hands are overflowing with coins So he'll bring you a piece of cake, With syrup flowing, Down your chin... -chorus- Next month will be Saint Nicholas day, For sure, he'll come see you one evening, To say a sermon, and let you place, A big basket under the fireplace Which he'll fill, if you behave, With things that make you joyful Otherwise, his donkey, Will bring you a big whip -chorus- Neither plain bread, nor ginger bread, Had any effect. But the whip, Swiftly calmed little Narcisse down Who feared the coming of the donkey, He said his lullaby, His mother put him in his cradle, Took his pillow, And repeated 20 times over, Sleep my little child My little chick, My plump grape, You will cause me grief If you don't sleep until tomorrow

== See also ==
- Folk music
- P'tit Quinquin on French Wikisource
