= Farah Nabulsi =

British-Palestinian filmmaker

- Born: London, United Kingdom
- Education: Francis Holland School
- Occupations: Director, producer
- Years active: 2016–present

Farah Nabulsi (Arabic: فرح النابلسي) is a British Palestinian director, screenwriter, and film producer, also known for her human rights advocacy. For her short film The Present, she was nominated for an Academy Award and won the BAFTA Award for Best Short Film.

== Early life and education ==
Farah Nabulsi was born and raised in London, England, and is the daughter of a Palestinian mother and Palestinian-Egyptian father. Her father came to the UK to study for a PhD in civil engineering, and her mother arrived via Kuwait when her family left Palestine following the Arab-Israeli War of 1967.

Nabulsi attended Francis Holland School for girls and is a graduate of Cass Business School, London.

She made the decision following a trip to Palestine in 2013 for the first time as an adult to trace her family roots.

== Career ==
In her late 30s, Nabulsi switched her career after working in the city as a CFA-qualified stockbroker at a boutique investment bank, and later JP Morgan.

In 2016, she founded Native Liberty Productions, a not-for-profit media production company that aims to reverse the dehumanisation of the Palestinians and draw attention to the injustices they face.

Nabulsi's directorial debut was the 2020 short film The Present, which earned multiple nominations and awards, winning the 2021 BAFTA Award for Best Short Film.

Her second feature film, The Teacher, premiered on 9 September 2023 at the Toronto International Film Festival and tells the story of a Palestinian school teacher who struggles to reconcile his risky commitment to political resistance with his emotional support for one of his students and the chance of a new relationship with a volunteer worker.

== Activism ==
Nabulsi founded oceansofinjustice.com, a digital resource that deconstructs the Israeli military occupation of Palestine.

In September 2025, she signed an open pledge with Film Workers for Palestine pledging not to work with Israeli film institutions "that are implicated in genocide and apartheid against the Palestinian people."

== Recognition and awards ==
Nabulsi has been invited to screen her work and speak at various events, including the United Nations Headquarters in New York, where she addressed the delegates in the Trustee Chamber Council.

=== Accolades for films ===
The Present was nominated for the Academy Award for Best Live Action Short Film. On 10 April 2021 it won the BAFTA Award for Best Short Film; the only short that was up for both awards. Prior to this, The Present won many awards at various film festivals around the world.

The Teacher won over a dozen international awards, including the Audience Award at San Francisco International Film Festival. It was also BAFTA-Longlisted for Outstanding Debut by a British Writer, Director or Producer (2024) and BIFA-Longlisted in three categories (2023). Saleh Bakri's performance in the film earned him several Best Actor awards, including at Belgrade Film Festival and from the 8th Critics Awards for Arab Films, where The Teacher was also nominated in three other categories: Best Film, Best Cinematography, and Best Music.

Year	Film	Academy Awards		BAFTA Awards	
Year	Film	Nom.	Wins	Nom.	Wins
2021	The Present	1		1	1
2024	The Teacher			1	

== Filmography ==
Year	Title	Director	Writer	Producer	
2016	Oceans of Injustice	No	Yes	Yes	Short
2017	Today They Took My Son	No	Yes	Yes	Short
2018	Nightmare of Gaza	No	Yes	Yes	Short
2020	The Present	Yes	Yes	No	Short
2023	The Teacher	Yes	Yes	Yes	Feature
